= Sohail Khan (disambiguation) =

Sohail Khan (born 1970) is an Indian actor and filmmaker.

Other notable people with the same name include:

- Sohail Khan (cricketer, born 1967), Pakistan
- Sohail Khan (cricketer, born 1984), Pakistan

== See also ==
- Souhail (disambiguation)
- Suhail A. Khan, Indian-American activist
- Suhail Yusuf Khan (born 1988), Indian sarangi player
