= Souhail =

Souhail, Suhail, Sohail or other variants (Arabic: سهيل) is an Arabic term commonly used as a male given name and surname.

Souhail or its variants may refer to:

== Astronomy ==
- Suhail or Lambda Velorum (λ Velorum), a star in the southern constellation of Vela
- Suhail (star), several stars traditionally called Suhail or variants thereof
- Canopus or Suhayl, the second-brightest star in the night sky

== People ==
=== Given name ===
==== Sohail ====
- Sohail Ahmed (born 1963), Pakistani comedian
- Sohail Butt (born 1966), Pakistani cricketer
- Sohail Inayatullah (born 1958), futures studies theorist
- Sohail Khan (born 1970), Bollywood actor/director
- Sohail Quadri (born 1971/72), Canadian politician
- Sohail Sen (born 1984), Indian film composer
- Sohail Tanvir (born 1984), Pakistani cricketer

==== Souhail ====
- Souhail Hamouchane (born 1997), Moroccan swimmer

==== Souheil ====
- Souheil Ben-Barka (born 1942), Moroccan film director

==== Suhail ====
- Suhail Abdulla (born 1999), Emirati footballer
- Suhail Akbar, a fictional character in the Left Behind series of novels
- Sohail Aman (born 1959), retired Chief of Staff of the Pakistan Air Force
- Suhail Andleev (born 1982), Indian cricketer
- Suhail Bahwan (1938/39–2025), Omani businessman
- Suhail Chandhok (born 1987), Indian television presenter and commentator
- Suhail Galadari (born 1977), Emirati business man,
- Suhail A. Khan, American activist
- Suhail Yusuf Khan (born 1988), Indian sarangi player
- Suhail Koya, Indian Malayalam lyricist and screenwriter
- Suhail Al-Mansoori (born 1993), Emirati footballer
- Suhail Al Mazroui (born 1973), Emirati businessman and politician
- Suhail Nayyar (born 1989), Bollywood actor
- Suhail Al-Noubi (born 1996), Emirati footballer
- Suhail Rizvi (born 1965), American businessman
- Suhail Sharma (born 1981), Indian cricketer

==== Suhayl ====
- Suhayl ibn Amr (556–639), a famous speaker and contemporary of the Islamic prophet Muhammad

==== Suheil ====
- Suheil al-Hassan (born 1970), Brigadier General in the Syrian Army

==== Suheyl ====
- Süheyl Batum (born 1965), Turkish academic

=== Middle name ===
- Mir Suhail Qadri (born 1989), political cartoonist from Kashmir
- Mohammed Suhail Chinya Salimpasha (born 2001), Indian malnutrition researcher and inventor
- Muhammad Suhail Zubairy (born 1952), Pakistani professor of physics

=== Surname ===
- Abdelouahed Souhail (born 1946), Moroccan politician

==== Suhail ====
- Ahmed Suhail (born 1999), Qatari footballer
- Ahmed Al-Suhail (born 1988), Saudi football player
- Iqbal Suhail (1884–1955), Urdu poet
- Qusay al-Suhail, Iraqi politician
- Rami Suhail (born 2000), Qatari professional footballer
- Ushna Suhail (born 1993), Pakistani female tennis player

== See also ==
- Soheil, Persian given name
- Suhaldev, legendary king of medieval India
- Sohel (disambiguation)
- Sohail Khan (disambiguation)
