= James William Hindle =

British singer-songwriter from Yorkshire

James William Hindle (also known as Jimmy Hindle) is a British singer-songwriter from Yorkshire. He released three albums in the 2000s on Badman Records before re-emerging in the 2010s as a member of Glasgow-based indie rock bands The Pooches and US Highball.

== Early life ==
Hindle was born in Yorkshire and his early musical projects involved playing gigs in Leeds in various bands, including a punk band called Coping Saw. After moving to London, Hindle's cover of John Denver's song "Whispering Jesse" was heard by producer and head of Badman Records Dylan Magierek, who included it on the Denver tribute album Take Me Home (2000).

== Badman Records (2001–2005) ==
Hindle recorded his self-titled first album for Badman Records in 2001. Featuring American Music Club drummer Tim Mooney and former Tarnation singer Paula Frazer, the album drew comparisons to Nick Drake and included a cover of the Bee Gees' I Started a Joke. Reviews were generally positive. Pitchfork said, "for a nascent artist, Hindle's craft is quite well-formed and it seems as though he can only go up from here", while SF Weekly said the album was "both personal and pure — a shimmering bubble reflecting the many facets of an intriguing new songwriter."

His second album, Prospect Park, was released by Badman in 2003. His backing band this time featured members of The Essex Green, The Ladybug Transistor and The Sunshine Fix. Pitchfork described the album as "woozily romantic" but "slightly soggy", while the website Exclaim! said, "Prospect Park is simply what dreams are made of."

Hindle's third and final album for Badman, Town Feeling, came out in 2005. Exclaim! once again gave a positive review, saying, "Although it's not groundbreaking, it's a great album that builds on Hindle's talents, which he seems to becoming more comfortable with."

== Later recordings ==
In 2006, Hindle released the limited edition album Joshong on Early Winter Recordings.

In 2012, he contributed a track to the Big Eyes Family Players album Folk Songs II, on which they asked guest vocalists to choose a traditional folk song to record. Hindle chose "Don't You Be Foolish, Pray", claiming in the sleeve notes of the album, "this song has been stuck in my head for years, ever since hearing Nic Jones' sublime take on it."

== The Pooches ==
In 2013, now calling himself Jimmy Hindle and living in Glasgow, he formed the indie rock band The Pooches. After putting out a limited edition cassette called Smoochin' With the Pooches in 2015, they released their full debut album The Pooches on Lame-O Records in 2016. The Spill Magazine's review of the record said, "It’s smarter than it needs to be, and it has heart that shines through the basic production. As far as upbeat Guitar Pop goes, it will please you and keep you coming back", while the website Punktastic compared the band to Belle and Sebastian, observing, "The Pooches celebrate the juxtaposition of bitter and sweet. Enjoyment is met with self-loathing and spite, all housed under a roof of immensely catchy pop."

== US Highball ==
Hindle's next project was the band US Highball, formed alongside his Pooches bandmate Calvin Halliday. They released a three-track EP called Think Again in 2018, followed by a full-length album entitled Great Record in 2019, both on Lame-O Records. Their second full-length album Up To High Doh was released in 2020.

== Discography ==
=== Albums ===
- James William Hindle (Badman Recording Co.), 2001
- Prospect Park (Badman Recording Co.), 2003
- Town Feeling (Badman Recording Co.), 2005
- Joshong (Early Winter Recordings), 2006

=== with The Pooches ===
- Smoochin' With the Pooches (Gold Mold Records), 2015 (cassette only)
- The Pooches (Lame-O Records), 2016

=== with US Highball ===
- Think Again (Fuzzkill Records, Lame-O Records), 2018
- Great Record (Lame-O Records), 2019
- Up To High Doh (Bingo Records, Lame-O Records), 2020

=== Other contributions ===
- Take Me Home (A Tribute to John Denver) (Badman Recording Co.), 2000 – "Whispering Jesse"
- The Amos House Collection, Volume II (Wishing Tree Records), 2002 – "Aporia"
- Des Vagues de Pierre (Comes With a Smile), 2002 – "Always Reminders (demo)"
- Better Things Beginning (Motorcoat Records), 2002 – "Rooftops in West London in Summer"
- Badman's Bedtime Maladies (Badman Recording Co.), 2002 – "Slumberland"
- Acuarela Songs 2 (Acuarela Discos), 2003 – "Talkin' Watercolour Blues"
- The Amos House Collection, Volume III (Wishing Tree Records), 2003 – "I Am What I Am"
- Protect Our Secret Handshake (Comes With a Smile), 2003 – "W11 3HN"
- Sigmatropic – Could That Be The Voice? (Tongue Master Records), 2004 – "Haiku 15"
- Early Winter Music Vol #1 (Early Winter Recordings), 2005 – "Sleeping Still (home demo)" and "A Bakewell Dawn"
- The Last Town Chorus/James William Hindle/Aaron Stout (Comes With a Smile), 2005 – "A Day in the Life", "Wind & Water" and "Title Fight: Heart v. Mind"
- Close Your Eyes EP (Chaffinch Records), 2007 – "Birds of St. Marks" (with Calvin Halliday)
- Big Eyes Family Players & Friends – Folk Songs II (Static Caravan Recordings), 2012 – "Don't You Be Foolish, Pray"
