= Yorkston/Thorne/Khan =

Musical trio

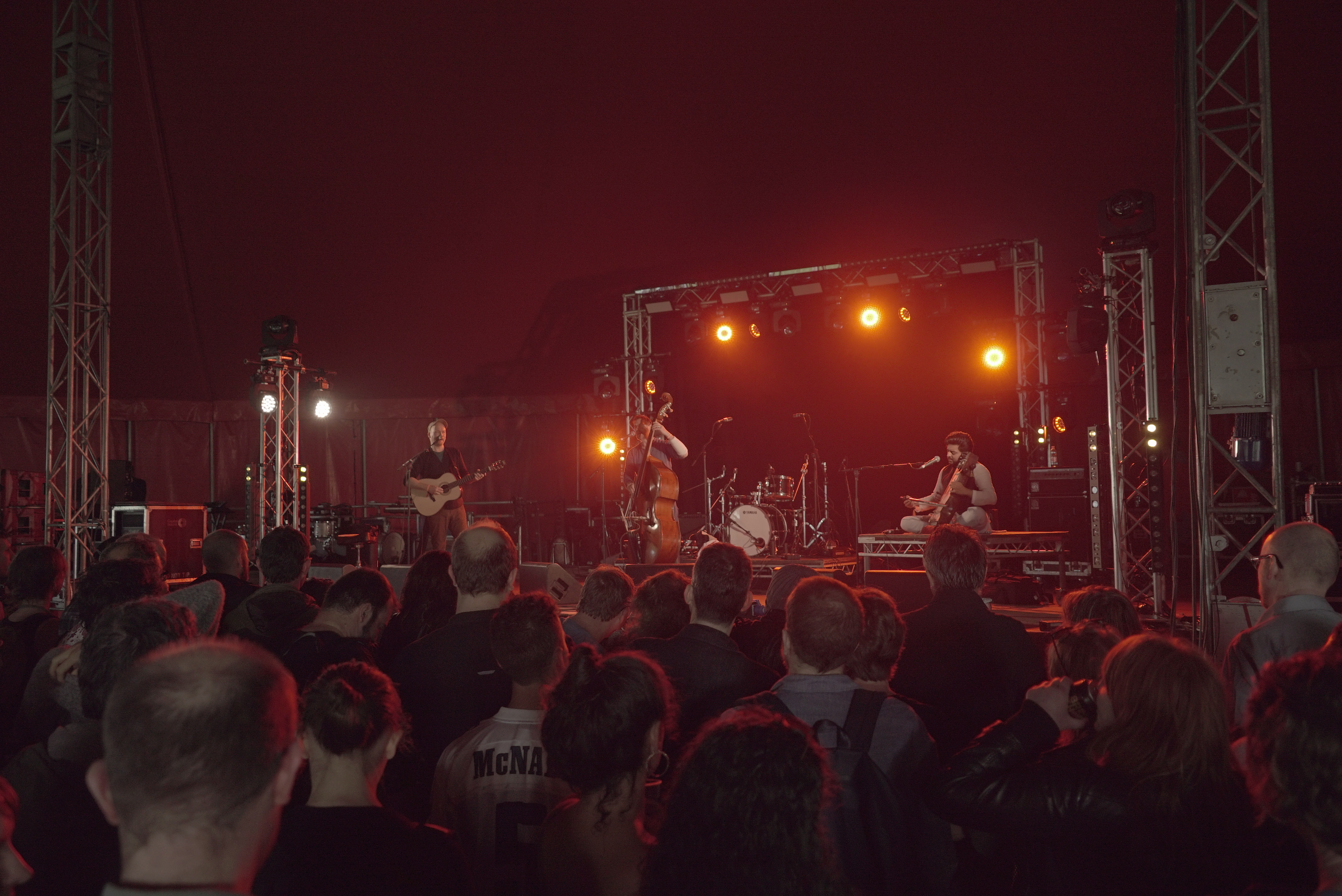
- Yorkston Thorne Khan at Shacklewell Arms tent, 2016

Background information
- Origin: Fife; Isle of Wight; Delhi
- Genres: Folk, jazz, Indian classical music
- Years active: 2015–present
- Labels: Domino Records
- Members: James Yorkston; Jon Thorne; Suhail Yusuf Khan
- Website: www.yorkstonthornekhan.com

Yorkston/Thorne/Khan (sometimes styled as Yorkston Thorne Khan or Yorkston ♥ Thorne ♥ Khan) is a musical trio made up of the Scottish singer-songwriter and guitarist James Yorkston, English bass player and singer Jon Thorne and Indian sarangi player and singer Suhail Yusuf Khan. Their musical style has been described as "Indian-folk-jazz fusion" and "a kind of rustic neo-psychedelia". Their recordings feature both original and traditional material, with lyrics in English, Hindi, Urdu and other languages of the Indian subcontinent. They have released three albums on Domino Records.

== Formation ==
Yorkston had been performing with ex-Lamb bass player Thorne for several years when he met Khan backstage at a concert in Edinburgh in 2011. Describing their meeting in a 2016 interview, Khan said, "He was chilling in his green room and I walked inside, and he saw my instrument – it was one of those things where music became the universal language because it came before we learnt each other’s names, and we ended up playing a 90-minute set together." Thorne was brought in to make up the trio after the pair discounted the idea of working with a saxophonist or a tabla player, and he emphasizes the uniqueness of the project, saying, "It’s the first time in musical history that there’s been sarangi, double bass, guitar and vocals. It’s unusual, so people don’t know what to expect and they’re curious about it. A lot of the songs that Suhail is bringing in are devotional so it’s quite a deep spiritual experience."

== Everything Sacred ==
The trio's first album, Everything Sacred, was released in January 2016. Irish singer Lisa O'Neill makes an appearance and in the album's liner notes, Yorkston reveals that the possibility of calling the group Yorkston/Thorne/Khan/O'Neill was discussed, but that she saw herself as a guest.

Opening with the 13-minute track "Knochentanz" and featuring covers of songs by Ivor Cutler and Lal Waterson, as well as a version of Yorkston's song "Broken Wave" from his previous release The Cellardyke Recording and Wassailing Society, the album received very positive reviews from the UK music press. Awarding the album four stars out of five in The Guardian, critic Robin Denselow described it as "bravely original and worth checking out", while the website MusicOMH called it "a delight", saying, "It’s a wonderful tapestry of sound, with every element intricately woven." In a very positive review, the website Folk Radio UK said, "There is a constant state of flux, a constant drip of influences from one to another that augments creative possibilities rather than diluting them. Yorkston, Thorne and Khan have taken advantage of these possibilities to create an album that bristles with inventiveness and skill, an album that is more than the sum of its already impressive parts."

== Neuk Wight Delhi All-Stars ==
The title of their second album Neuk Wight Delhi All-Stars reflects their diverse geographical origins: Yorkston is from the East Neuk in Fife, Scotland; Thorne is from the Isle of Wight in England and Khan is from Delhi, India. Released in April 2017, it again received positive reviews from the press. The Glasgow Herald said, "Once more, this unusual trio has blended Indian and British folk sounds to create something fresh and utterly compelling", while in The Guardian, critic Neil Spencer called their collaboration "an improbable, but mostly seamless fit" and declared the album to be "Top drawer." Folk Radio UK said the album "defiantly establishes the distinctive trio as an evolving unit with much more to say and explore than just one album’s worth. They’re clearly not running short of ideas, and I can only wonder at the increasingly enterprising music-making a third album might bring."

== Navarasa: Nine Emotions ==
Their third album followed three years later in January 2020. Sometimes described as a concept album, Navarasa: Nine Emotions is based around the ancient principle that there are nine emotions that inform human interactions and the arts, with each track representing a different emotion such as love, sorrow, courage or wonder. Discussing the twelve-minute closing track, "Darbari", Folk Radio UK reflected that "The track – and by extension the album as a whole – achieves a kind of serenity that is certainly spiritual but is somehow completely secular and entirely inclusive. Its influences are clearly visible, but the way those influences are put together creates a kind of music that is original, exciting and wholly unique." The magazine The Skinny was also impressed, observing that "Yorkston/Thorne/Khan has evolved from a project born out of quiet respect for each other’s crafts into something aiming to blend them in a manner that truly forges new ground." The NME called it "an album that’s often breath-taking in its scope."

== Discography ==
=== Albums ===
- Everything Sacred (Domino Records), 2016
- Neuk Wight Delhi All-Stars (Domino Records), 2017
- Navarasa: Nine Emotions (Domino Records), 2020

== Personnel ==
- James Yorkston - Vocals, guitar, nyckelharpa, harmonium, piano, accordion, electric bass, bouzouki, percussion, harmonica, synth, dhol
- Jon Thorne - Vocals, double bass, electric bass, guitar, piano
- Suhail Yusuf Khan - Vocals, sarangi, tanpura
- Lisa O'Neill - Vocals, piano (on Everything Sacred)
