= Folk Songs (James Yorkston album) =

Studio album by James Yorkston
- Released: 8 October 2009
- Genre: Folk
- Label: Domino
- Producer: James Yorkston

James Yorkston chronology
When the Haar Rolls In (2008)	Folk Songs (2009)	I Was a Cat from a Book (2012)

Folk Songs is a 2009 album by the Scottish singer-songwriter James Yorkston in collaboration with the Big Eyes Family Players. As the title suggests, all of the tracks are traditional British and Irish folk songs (along with one from Galicia, Spain). Many of them are versions of songs recorded by singers in the 1960s British folk revival, such as Nic Jones, Anne Briggs and Shirley Collins.

== Critical reception ==
The album received generally positive reviews from the music press. Writing in The Guardian, Robin Denselow called it "one of the more intriguing folk albums of the summer," adding that "it's an album of strong songs, and may well prompt a new audience to check out the earlier recordings." The Quietus described the album as "a fine tribute to the folk tradition of a musician taking long established songs, putting his own mark on the tested formulas and then passing them on for consumption by whoever encounters them along the road." Reviewing the album for Drowned in Sound, Noel Gardner praised its interpretations of traditional material and warm, understated arrangements, concluding that it would be "received with a deserved warmth by an established cluster of fans," and awarded it a score of 7 out of 10.

== Track listing ==
1. "Hills of Greenmoor"
2. "Just as the Tide was Flowing"
3. "Martinmas Time"
4. "Mary Connaught & James O'Donnell"
5. "Thorneymoor Woods"
6. "I Went to Visit the Roses"
7. "Pandeirada de Entrimo"
8. "Little Musgrave"
9. "Rufford Park Poachers"
10. "Sovay"
11. "Low Down in the Broom"

== Folk Songs II ==
In 2012, the Big Eyes Family Players released a follow-up album entitled Folk Songs II on Static Caravan Recordings, featuring a variety of guest vocalists including James Yorkston, Alasdair Roberts, Elle Osborne and Adrian Crowley.
