= Folk Songs II =

Studio album by Big Eyes Family Players & Friends
- Released: 2012
- Genre: Folk
- Label: Static Caravan Recordings
- Producer: James Green, David Jaycock

Big Eyes Family Players & Friends chronology
Folk Songs (2009)	Folk Songs II (2012)

Folk Songs II is an album by the Big Eyes Family Players & Friends, released in 2012 on Static Caravan Recordings. It is the follow-up to the 2009 album Folk Songs by James Yorkston and the Big Eyes Family Players.

== Background ==
Following the success of the first Folk Songs album and tour, and at a loss for what to do next, Yorkston suggested to the Big Eyes Family Players leader James Green that he make a sequel. Green then invited some of his favourite singers to choose songs and he would provide the music. A limited-edition version of the album features a bonus CD entitled The Meersbrook Manor Sessions, which contains three additional tracks.

== Critical reception ==
The album received positive reviews from the music press. Writing in The Guardian, Robin Denselow commented on the "even more adventurous, often sprawling arrangements", compared to the first album, and called it "A strange, compelling set." Folk Radio UK said, "The Big Eyes Family Players have proven yet again that they are sensitive interpreters of traditional folk songs", while the website For Folk's Sake commented that, "anyone who can’t find plenty to be excited about really doesn’t have the right to call themselves a folk fan."

== Track listing ==
1. "Greenland Bound" (featuring Adrian Crowley)
2. "A Man Indeed" (featuring Mary Hampton and Sharron Kraus)
3. "Looly, Looly" (featuring James Yorkston)
4. "The Clyde Water" (featuring Heather Ditch)
5. "The Coast O' Spain" (featuring Alasdair Roberts)
6. "Farewell Lovely Nancy" (featuring Nancy Elizabeth)
7. "Doffing Mistress" (featuring James Yorkston and Elle Osborne)
8. "Don't You Be Foolish, Pray" (featuring James William Hindle)
9. "Stretched On Your Grave" (featuring Adrian Crowley)
10. "Thousands Or More" (featuring Elle Osborne)
11. "Bonny Boy" (featuring Heather Ditch)
12. "Maureen From Gippursland" (featuring Alasdair Roberts)

=== The Meersbrook Manor Sessions ===
1. "Hares On The Mountain" (featuring Heather Ditch)
2. "A Beggar, A Beggar" (featuring James Yorkston)
3. "Just As The Tide Was Flowing" (featuring James Green)
