= Sohel =

Sohel may refer to:

- Sohel Rana (disambiguation)
- Gazi Sohel, Bangladeshi cricket umpire

== See also ==
- Souhail (disambiguation)
