= From the Ground Up =

From the Ground Up may refer to:

- From the Ground Up (Shady Bard album)
- From the Ground Up (Antigone Rising album)
- From the Ground Up (Collective Soul EP)
- From the Ground Up (The Roots EP)
- From the Ground Up with Debbie Travis, a Canadian television series
- "From the Ground Up" (song), a song by Dan + Shay
- From the Ground Up, a song by Sleeping At Last
- From the Ground Up (film) 1921 American film directed by E. Mason Hopper
