= When the Haar Rolls In =

Studio album by James Yorkston
- Released: 1 September 2008
- Genre: Folk
- Label: Domino
- Producer: James Yorkston

James Yorkston chronology
Roaring the Gospel (2007)	When the Haar Rolls In (2008)	Folk Songs (2009)

Professional ratings
Review scores
Source	Rating
Daily Express	link
Guardian Unlimited	link
The List	link
The Skinny	link
The Times	link
Uncut	link
PopMatters	8/10

When the Haar Rolls In is the fourth studio album by James Yorkston. The haar in the title is also a metaphor for depression.

Released on 1 September 2008 in the UK, the album was available on double 10" vinyl, CD, and a limited edition discbox set which features the original album in CD and 10" vinyl format, a disc of remixes of Yorkston's songs and a disc of covers of Yorkston's songs.

Norma Waterson, Mike Waterson and Marry Waterson feature on the album.

== Track listing ==
1. "B's Jig"
2. "Tortoise Regrets Hare"
3. "Temptation"
4. "When the Haar Rolls In"
5. "Queen of Spain"
6. "Midnight Feast"
7. "Would You Have Me Born with Wooden Eyes?"
8. "Summer's Not the Same Without You"
9. "The Capture of the Horse"

=== Covers disc ===
1. "The Lang Toun" - Rozi Plain
2. "In Your Hands" - Pictish Trail & HMS Ginafore
3. "St. Patrick" - David Thomas Broughton
4. "Are You Coming Home Tonight?" - Suzy Mangion
5. "Us Late Travellers" - Charlotte Greig
6. "Shipwreckers" - Adrian Crowley
7. "Sweet Jesus" - Nancy Elizabeth
8. "Tender to the Blues" - Cathal Coughlan
9. "Summer Song" - U.N.P.O.C.
10. "Tortoise Regrets Hare" - King Creosote
11. "Banjo # 2" - John Smith
12. "Would You Have Me Born with Wooden Eyes?" - Archie Bronson Outfit
13. "Banjo # 1" - Doogie Paul and the Athletes
14. "Steady as She Goes" - Viking Moses
15. "Sail On" - James Yorkston
16. "Heron" - Jon Hopkins

=== Remixes disc ===
1. "I Know My Love" - James Yorkston's Remix
2. "Summer Song" - Dolphin Boy Remix
3. "Woozy with Cider" - King Biscuit Time Remix
4. "The River Just Beyond" - On The Fly Remix
5. "The Capture Of The Horse" - James Yorkston's Remix
6. "Orgiva Song" - On The Fly Remix
7. "The Brussels Rambler" - Reuben Taylor's Remix
8. "Would You Have Me Born with Wooden Eyes?" - Chicken Feed Remix
9. "When the Haar Rolls In" - King Creosote Remix
10. "Tortoise Regrets Hare" - Down The Tiny Steps Remix
11. "The Lang Toun" - Four Tet Remix
12. "St. Patrick" - James Yorkston's Remix

== Musicians ==
- James Yorkston - Vocals (1–9), Guitar (1–9), Banjo (1,2,4,6,8,9), Clarinet (1,4,9), Xylophone (2), Bouzouki (3,7–9), Percussion (4), Noises (4), Harmonium (4), Psaltery (6), Concertina (6,9), Mandolin (7–9), Vibraphone (7,8), Rhodes (9), Violin (9)
- Jon Bews - Violin (9)
- Nancy Elizabeth - Harp (1), Vocals (9)
- Marry Gilhooly - Vocals (6)
- Olly Knight - Electric Guitar (6)
- Walter Dexter O'Driscoll - Prepared Piano (4)
- Doogie Paul - Contrabass (1,3–9), Electric Bass (2), Guitar (2), Vocals (3,5,6,8), Vibraphone (6)
- Faisal Rahman - Percussion (1–4,6,7,9)
- Sarah Scutt - Clarinet (2,3,6–8), Vocals (7)
- Emma Smith - Violin (1–3,5–7), Vocals (5,8)
- Reuben Taylor - Piano (1–7), Accordion (1,3,4,7), Harpsichord (1,3), Vibraphone (1,6,9), Concertina (2), Rhodes (2,3), Hammond Organ (4), Timpani (4), Noises (4), Contrabass (6), Vocals (6), Wine Glass (6), Harmonium (7)
- Mike Waterson - Vocals (6)
- Norma Waterson - Vocals (6)
