= Torch song (disambiguation) =

A torch song is a sentimental love song.

Torch song may also refer to:

== Theatre, film, and television ==
- Torch Song (1953 film), a 1953 film starring Joan Crawford
- Torch Song (1993 film), a 1993 made-for-television drama film
- Torch Song (2024 film), a 2024 film starring Carla Juri
- Torch Song Trilogy, a 1982 play by Harvey Fierstein
- Torch Song Trilogy (film), a 1988 film adaptation of the Harvey Fierstein play
- "Torch Song" (The New Batman Adventures), a 1998 episode of The New Batman Adventures

== Music ==
- Torch Song (band), a British 1980s synthpop band
- "Torch Song", a song by AFI from the album Crash Love
- "Torch Song", a song by Marillion from the album Clutching at Straws
- "Torch Song", a song by Todd Rundgren from the album Something/Anything?
- "Torch Song", a song by Shady Bard from the album From the Ground Up
- "Torch Song", a song by Irving Berlin

== Literature ==
- "Torch Song" (short story), a 1947 short story by John Cheever
- Torch Song, an essay by Charles Bowden published in the book, The Best American Essays 1999
