= James Yorkston =

Scottish folk musician

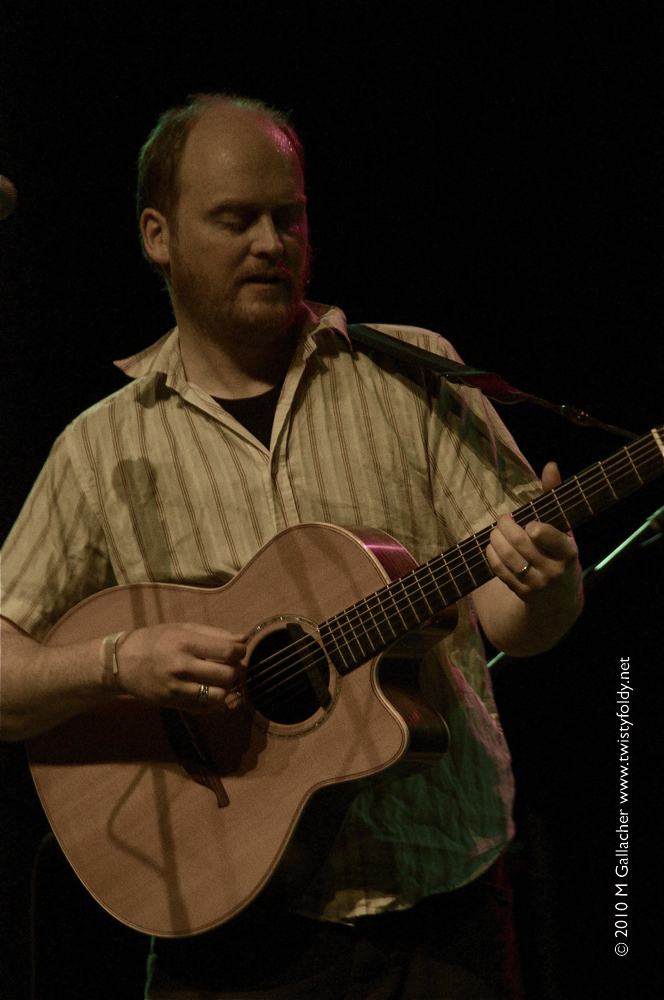
- Yorkston in 2010

Background information
- Born: James Patrick Yorkston Wright; 21 December 1971 (age 54); Stratford-upon-Avon, England
- Origin: Kingsbarns, Fife, Scotland
- Genre: Folk
- Occupations: Musician, singer, songwriter
- Instruments: Guitar, piano, banjo, bouzouki, nyckelharpa, concertina
- Labels: Domino Recording Company, Fence Records
- Member of: Yorkston/Thorne/Khan
- Website: jamesyorkston.co.uk

James Yorkston (born James Patrick Yorkston Wright; 21 December 1971) is a Scottish folk musician, singer-songwriter and author from the village of Kingsbarns, Fife. He has been releasing music since 2001. As well as recording as a solo artist, he has released music with his backing band the Athletes, as part of the Fence Collective, and as a member of the trio Yorkston/Thorne/Khan. He has also written fiction and non-fiction books.

== Influences and early years ==
A native of Fife, James Yorkston was an integral early member of the Fence Collective, a collaborative group of musicians including King Creosote, The Aliens, KT Tunstall, The Beta Band and The Pictish Trail. Yorkston is primarily a singer-songwriter, although he also tackles a variety of traditional songs, learned from singers such as Anne Briggs, Dick Gaughan, Nic Jones, Martin Carthy, Lal Waterson, John Strachan and Adrian Crowley. His quoted main influences are Anne Briggs, Linton Kwesi Johnson, Michael Hurley, Can and the Malagasy D'Gary.

Yorkston started out as bassist for the punk band Huckleberry, which morphed into the band Miraclehead, both of whom were fronted by Vic Galloway and recorded a number of independently released records. Yorkston's solo career began when John Peel played a demo of his "Moving Up Country, Roaring the Gospel", proclaiming it had the best song title of the year. This led to Bad Jazz Records releasing that track as Yorkston's debut 7" under the name "J. Wright Presents".

== Signing to Domino Records and Moving Up Country ==
By this time Yorkston had started to play solo gigs in Edinburgh, his debut supporting Bert Jansch in the Café Royal. Seeking more shows, Yorkston sent a copy of the single to John Martyn, asking him for a support slot on his forthcoming Edinburgh date, and Martyn responded by offering Yorkston all 31 dates on his tour. Subsequently, he signed to Domino Records, recording music with a number of friends and associates credited as The Athletes. His debut album Moving Up Country, co-produced by Simon Raymonde of the Cocteau Twins, became Rough Trade Record Shops Album of the Year for 2002. In 2003 Yorkston played at the inaugural Green Man Festival.

== Just Beyond the River ==
For Yorkston's second album, he asked Kieran Hebden of Four Tet on board as producer, and they made Just Beyond the River. Released on vinyl, CD and as a limited edition 2-CD set with the otherwise unavailable EP Fearsome Fairytale Lovers, the album was well received by the music press. Pete Paphides of The Times wrote, "Yorkston has reached a state of grace that writers can spend forever trying to attain: songs that sound not so much written as carefully retrieved from your own subconscious, played with an intuition bordering on telepathy. What more could you ask for?" while Pitchfork said, "Yorkston's record creates a bucolic, timeless world where magic remains a recent memory." Yorkston's fan base continued to grow and he was offered tours with Beth Orton, David Gray, Tindersticks, Turin Brakes, Lambchop and Kathryn Williams, as well as a slot on the Accelerator tour of Sweden.

== The Year of the Leopard, Roaring the Gospel and further collaborations ==
The follow-up, The Year of the Leopard (2006), was produced by Rustin Man, who had recently worked with Beth Gibbons (lead singer with the band Portishead) on their Out of Season record. The album was again well received by the press. Drowned in Sound said, "Yorkston's voice is red-wine warm and perfectly at ease with itself, filling each track to the brim with understated honesty", while Alexis Petridis, writing in The Guardian, said, "this is music that slowly charms rather than immediately stuns you, taking time to work its way under your skin. Once there, however, its lovely, understated melodies, autumnal arrangements and warm, wry lyrics...are virtually impossible to shift." Later the same year, Yorkston was given the chance to play with Bert Jansch once more, this time in Paris. Yorkston also invited Martin Carthy to play and share a stage with him at London's Union Chapel on 24 May 2007.

Also in 2007, Domino Records released Roaring the Gospel, a collection of EP tracks, overseas releases and new songs, which led the NME to observe that "Yorkston has talent as deep as a mine shaft", while the BBC website said, "Yorkston and his Athletes bathe their songs with warmth, allowing them to nestle snugly in a lush bed of tenderly plucked acoustic guitars, sighing woodwind and gently wheezing accordion."

In October 2007, Yorkston was invited to work as musical director with Oliver Knight and the Waterson–Carthy clan for the BBC Electric Proms tribute to Lal Waterson. This was broadcast on BBC Radio 2 by the Mike Harding Show as well as being filmed. Alongside Waterson–Carthy, the acts involved included Alasdair Roberts, Kathryn Williams and Lisa Knapp. Yorkston's involvement with the Fence Collective continued: he has toured extensively with King Creosote and regularly contributed to the Fence Collective's Homegame mini-festivals featuring guest performances by artists such as The Concretes and Hot Chip. Yorkston also plays in the Fence Collective bands The 3 Craws, Pictish Trail and U.N.P.O.C.

== When the Haar Rolls In and Folk Songs ==
Yorkston's fifth album, When the Haar Rolls In, was released through Domino Records on 1 September 2008. Guests included Norma Waterson, Mike Waterson, Marry Waterson and Oliver Knight. A special edition was released featuring an album of remixes and an album of James Yorkston covers by artists such as King Creosote, U.N.P.O.C. and Cathal Coughlan. Among the positive reviews, the website PopMatters called the album, "one of the most consistently compelling and beautiful records to be released in quite a while."

In August 2009, Yorkston collaborated with the band the Big Eyes Family Players on the album Folk Songs. As the title suggests, all of the tracks are traditional British and Irish folk songs (along with one from Galicia, Spain). Many of them are versions of songs recorded by singers in the 1960s British folk revival, such as Nic Jones, Anne Briggs and Shirley Collins. In 2012, the Big Eyes Family Players released a follow-up album entitled Folk Songs II on Static Caravan Recordings, featuring a variety of guest vocalists including Yorkston, Alasdair Roberts and Adrian Crowley.

In 2011, he collaborated with The Fruit Tree Foundation, appearing on its debut album, First Edition.

== I Was a Cat from a Book ==
In August 2012, Domino Records released Yorkston's seventh album, I Was a Cat from a Book, which was co-produced by the Welsh singer David Wrench and features a guest appearance by Kathryn Williams. Among the generally positive reviews, The Line of Best Fit said, "Yorkston exposes and plays with his emotional connection to life around him, showing once again that he is able to put pen to paper in a way that his contemporaries can only dream of", while The Arts Desk praised "Yorkston's well-crafted songs, swathed in atmospheric strings, and tinged with melancholy and mystery". The album debuted on the Official Record Store Chart at number 6.

== The Cellardyke Recording and Wassailing Society and Tae Sup wi' a Fifer ==
On 3 November 2012, Doogie Paul, double-bassist of The Athletes, died of cancer aged 40. Yorkston wrote the song "Broken Wave (A Blues for Doogie)" in tribute to his friend, and this track would go on to feature on his next album, The Cellardyke Recording and Wassailing Society. Released in August 2014, it was produced by Alexis Taylor of synth-pop band Hot Chip, and featured special guests KT Tunstall and The Pictish Trail, amongst others. Once again, the album received very good reviews, with the NME calling Yorkston, "one of the country's great songwriters", commenting: "His honesty, wry humour and rippling folk guitar are on peak form on his collaboration-focused eighth album."

For Record Store Day 2015, Domino Records released a limited edition vinyl album entitled The Demonstrations of the Craws, featuring a compilation of demos from The Cellardyke Recording and Wassailing Society and I Was a Cat from a Book. Yorkston also began running his folk club Tae Sup wi' a Fifer, in Kirkcaldy, Fife, featuring guests such as Martin Carthy, Alexis Taylor, Dick Gaughan, Richard Dawson, Bill Wells and Aidan Moffat, Karine Polwart, Lisa O'Neill, Steve Mason, Linton Kwesi Johnson, Brìghde Chaimbeul, Malcolm Middleton, Ian McMillan, Ian Rankin, Horse McDonald and Phill Jupitus.

== Yorkston/Thorne/Khan ==
In 2016, Yorkston released the album Everything Sacred as part of a trio, with Jon Thorne (a double bass player best known for his work with electro outfit Lamb) and Suhail Yusuf Khan, an eighth generation Sarangi player from New Delhi, India, under the name Yorkston/Thorne/Khan. The unusual blend of musical influences prompted enthusiastic reviews, with Folk Radio UK observing, "There is a constant state of flux, a constant drip of influences from one to another that augments creative possibilities rather than diluting them. Yorkston, Thorne and Khan have taken advantage of these possibilities to create an album that bristles with inventiveness and skill, an album that is more than the sum of its already impressive parts."

The trio went on to release two further critically acclaimed albums, Neuk Wight Delhi All-Stars (2017) and Navarasa: Nine Emotions (2020).

== The Route to the Harmonium ==
His ninth album, The Route to the Harmonium, recorded in the small Scottish fishing village of Cellardyke and co-produced by David Wrench, was released on 22 February 2019, via Domino to mostly positive reviews. Drowned In Sound commented that, "His music feels part of the scenery rather than derived from it. The softly picked and swept guitars spread their roots deep into his musical heritage, while the songs he sings tell tales that feel passed through the generations, even in their deeply personal nature." Meanwhile, The Skinny called it, "a captivating listen that demands your attention."

== That Summer, We Flew and The Wide, Wide River ==
In May 2020, during the coronavirus lockdown, Yorkston put together an album for digital download from Bandcamp, entitled That Summer, We Flew. He described it as an "album of demos, duets, covers and soundtrack work to help grease the wheels a bit during this time of Cholera." This was followed in January 2021 by his tenth album proper, The Wide, Wide River, recorded with the Swedish music collective The Second Hand Orchestra. The songs were recorded over two studio sessions, with the band not having heard the material prior to recording.

== J. Wright Presents and The Great White Sea Eagle and Songs for Nina and Johanna and Yorkston / Jaycock / Langendorf ==
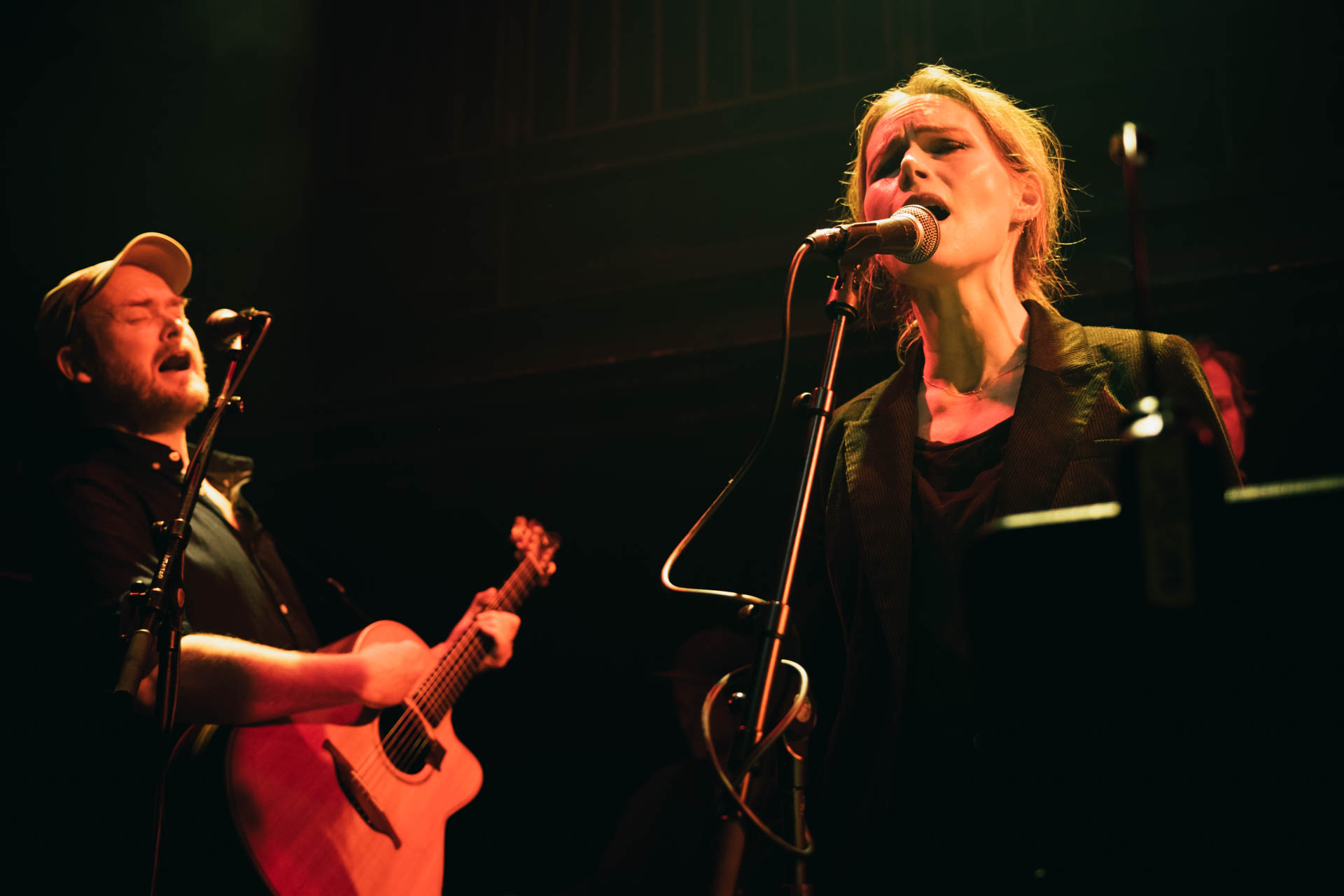
James Yorkston with Nina Persson (playing with The Second Hand Orchestra) in 2023

In November 2021, Yorkston released a vinyl only compilation of his instrumental electronic music, reviving his original stage name, J. Wright Presents.

In October 2022, Domino Recording Company posted a single by Yorkston, Nina Persson and The Secondhand Orchestra called "Hold Out For Love." The post's description said the track was "from the forthcoming album 'The Great White Sea Eagle,' which was released 13th Jan 2022 on Domino Record Co., credited to "James Yorkston, Nina Persson & The Secondhand Orchestra."

In 2025, Black Sweat Records (Italy) and We Are Busy Bodies (Canada) co-released Yorkston / Jaycock / Langendorf, an improvised collaboration with David A Jaycock and Lina Langendorf. Back Seat Mafia called it "A thrilling electro-acoustic escapade from the alt-folk-jazz luminaries."

In August 2025, Domino Records released the album Songs for Nina and Johanna another collaboration with Nina Persson (of The Cardigans), this time joined by Johanna Söderberg of First Aid Kit

On 5th October 2025, James Yorkston and Nina Persson appeared on Later... with Jools Holland, performing their song 'Love That Tree'

== Writing ==
In March 2011 Yorkston's debut book, It's Lovely to be Here: The Touring Diaries of a Scottish Gent, launched Domino Records new publishing venture, the Domino Press. The Line of Best Fit called it "a charming and witty account of life on the road."

In early 2016, Freight Books published Yorkston's debut novel, Three Craws. The tale of a failed artist returning home to Scotland from London, the book was praised by The Scotsman as being, "a subtle, insightful and occasionally very funny look at the way small rural communities can sometimes smother their own, pushing people away while simultaneously pulling them back, demanding success while at the same time secretly hoping for failure."

In September 2022, Oldcastle Books published Yorkston's second novel, The Book of the Gaels. The publicity cited "Rural West Cork, Ireland. Two Kids, Joseph and Paul, and their struggling, poet father, Fraser, are battling grief and poverty. When a letter arrives with a summons to Dublin and the promise of publication, it offers a chink of light – the hope of rescue. But Dublin is a long, wet and hungry way from West Cork in the mid-70s, especially when they have no money – just the clothes they stand up in and an old, battered suitcase".

In January 2025 Oldcastle Books published Yorkston's 3rd Novel, Tommy The Bruce which The Sunday Mail called "An outstandingly well written, emotionally complex slice of Scottish noir" and of which The Herald wrote "This Scots musician's novel would make the Coen brothers proud"

== Discography ==
=== Albums ===
- Moving Up Country (Domino Records), 2002 (as James Yorkston and the Athletes)
- Just Beyond the River (Domino Records), 2004 (as James Yorkston and the Athletes) – UK No. 155
- The Year of the Leopard (Domino Records), 2006
- Roaring the Gospel (Domino Records), 2007 (compilation of EP tracks, overseas releases and new songs)
- When the Haar Rolls In (Domino Records), 2008 – UK No. 178
- Folk Songs (Domino Records), 2009 (with the Big Eyes Family Players)
- I Was a Cat from a Book (Domino Records), 2012
- The Cellardyke Recording and Wassailing Society (Domino Records), 2014
- The Route to the Harmonium (Domino Records), 2019
- The Wide, Wide River (Domino Records), 2021 (with the Second Hand Orchestra)
- The Great White Sea Eagle (Domino Records), 2023 (with Nina Persson and the Second Hand Orchestra)
- Songs for Nina and Johanna, 2025

=== Limited release albums ===
- J. Wright Presents (Fence Records), 2001 (as J. Wright Presents)
- 30 (Fence Records), 2004 (one 30-minute track)
- Live at Le Poisson Mouillé (self-released, only available at concerts), 2006 (as James Yorkston and the Athletes)
- 'Lang Cat, Crooked Cat, Spider Cat (Fence Records), 2007
- Acoustic Sessions (self-released), 2008 (a collection of radio sessions, 2004–2008)
- My Yoke is Heavy – The Songs of Daniel Johnston (Chemikal Underground Records), 2013 (with Adrian Crowley)
- The Demonstrations of the Craws (Domino Records), 2015 (limited edition of 500 vinyl copies for Record Store Day)
- That Summer, We Flew (Bandcamp release), 2020
- J. Wright Presents (Bandcamp / website release, limited to 500 vinyl copies), 2021
- The Songs and the Poems of the Book of the Gaels (Bandcamp release), 2022
- Yorkston / Jaycock / Langendorf (Black Sweat / We Are Busy Bodies), 2025

=== Yorkston/Thorne/Khan albums ===
- Everything Sacred (Domino Records), 2016
- Neuk Wight Delhi All-Stars (Domino Records), 2017
- Navarasa: Nine Emotions (Domino Records), 2020

=== Singles and EPs ===
- "Moving Up Country" (Bad Jazz Records), 2001 (as J. Wright Presents)
- "St. Patrick" (Domino Records), 2002 (as James Yorkston and the Athletes)
- "Tender to the Blues" (Domino Records), 2002 (as James Yorkston and the Athletes)
- "The Lang Toun" (Domino Records), 2002 (as James Yorkston and the Athletes)
- "Sweet Jesus" (Domino Records), 2003
- Someplace Simple EP (Domino Records), 2003
- "Shipwreckers" (Domino Records), 2005 (as James Yorkston and the Athletes) – UK No. 88
- "Surf Song" (Domino Records), 2005 (as James Yorkston and the Athletes) – UK No. 241
- Hoopoe EP (Houston Party Records), 2005
- "Steady As She Goes" (Domino Records), 2006
- "Woozy With Cider" (Domino Records), 2007
- "Tortoise Regrets Hare" (Domino Records), 2008
- "Martinmas Time"/"Nottamun Town" (Domino Records), 2009 (with the Big Eyes Family Players)

=== Other contributions ===
- Migrating Bird: The Songs of Lal Waterson (Honest Jon's), 2007 – "At First She Starts"
- Ballads of the Book (Chemikal Underground), 2007 – "A Calvinist Narrowly Avoids Pleasure" (with Bill Duncan)
- Big Eyes Family Players & Friends – Folk Songs II (Static Caravan), 2012 – "Looly, Looly", "Doffing Mistress" and "A Beggar, A Beggar"
- The Wanderer: A Tribute to Jackie Leven (Cooking Vinyl), 2021 – "Empty Square in Soho"
- Our Singing Tradition Vol.1 (Broadside Hacks), 2021 – "The Stoutest Man in the Forty Twa"

== Books ==
- It's Lovely to be Here – The Touring Diaries of a Scottish Gent (Domino Press), 2011
- Three Craws (Freight Books), 2016
- The Book of the Gaels (Oldcastle Books) 2022
- Tommy The Bruce (Oldcastle Books) 2025
