= The Route to the Harmonium =

Studio album by James Yorkston
- Released: 22 February 2019
- Genre: Folk
- Label: Domino
- Producer: James Yorkston, David Wrench

James Yorkston chronology
The Cellardyke Recording and Wassailing Society (2014)	The Route to the Harmonium (2019)	The Wide, Wide River (2021)

The Route To The Harmonium is an album by the Scottish singer-songwriter James Yorkston, released in 2019 by Domino Records. Produced by Yorkston and David Wrench, it was his ninth album with Domino.

== Critical reception ==
The album received generally positive reviews. Drowned In Sound described Yorkston as, "an authentic bard of the Celtic traditions, a wandering minstrel sharing his tales with anyone who’ll listen", going on to say that "His music feels part of the scenery rather than derived from it. The softly picked and swept guitars spread their roots deep into his musical heritage, while the songs he sings tell tales that feel passed through the generations, even in their deeply personal nature." The magazine Loud and Quiet proclaimed that, "The full kaleidoscope of life is here and it is a rich experience for it."

Writing for PopMatters, John Bergstrom offered a more reserved assessment, noting the album's increased density and experimental textures while suggesting that its bleak lyrical tone and dissonant moments made it "less than enjoyable" when compared with Yorkston's earlier work, despite regarding it as an "impressive artistic statement."

In a more enthusiastic review, The Guardian, Jude Rogers praised Yorkston’s ability to balance intimacy and experimentation, describing the record as "engrossing" and highlighting its "delicate authority" and exploration of themes of life and death.

== Track listing ==
1. "Your Beauty Could Not Save You"
2. "The Irish Wars of Independence"
3. "Like Bees to Foxglove"
4. "Shallow"
5. "The Blue of the Thistle"
6. "My Mouth Ain't No Bible"
7. "Solitary Islands All"
8. "The Villages I Have Known My Entire Life"
9. "Oh Me, Oh My"
10. "Brittle"
11. "Yorkston Athletic"
12. "A Footnote to an Epitaph"

== Musicians ==
- James Yorkston - Vocals (1–12), Guitar (1–7,9–11), Electric Bass (1–4,6,7), Autoharp (1–6,8,10,11), Accordion (1), Dulcitone (1–7,10,11), Mandolin (1,2,5,7), Samples (1,9–11), Book Corder (1,2,6,7,11), Flute (1), Steel Drums (1), Percussion (1–6,9), Nyckelharpa (1–4,8–10), Mbira (1), Electric Flute (2), Dulcimer (2,4–8,10,11), Mono Synths (2), Reverse Mandolin (3), Concertina (3,8,10), Programming (4), Electric Piano (4,5), Hammond (4), A Buzzy Noise (4), Rain At Window (5,8), Spacey Noises (6), Keyboards (6,9), Fender Rhodes (7), Harmonium (8,10,12), Whistle (9), Fuzz Bass (9), Clarinet (9,10), Tanpura (11)
- Tom Arthurs - Trumpet (1,3–5,10–12)
- Grace Banks - Vocals (12)
- John Ellis - Piano (1,3,4,8–10,12), Hammond Organ (6)
- Doogie Paul - Double Bass (6,11)
- Faisal Rahman - Drums (6,11)
- Sarah Scutt - Vocals (1,3,4,6,11), Clarinet (1), Flute (2,9)
- Reuben Taylor - Accordion (6,11)
- Jon Thorne - Double Bass (1,8,10), Bowed Double Bass (2,3,7), Electric Bass (9)
- David Wrench - Arp Synth (4)
