= Sabri Khan =

Musician from India (1927–2015)

Ustad Sabri Khan
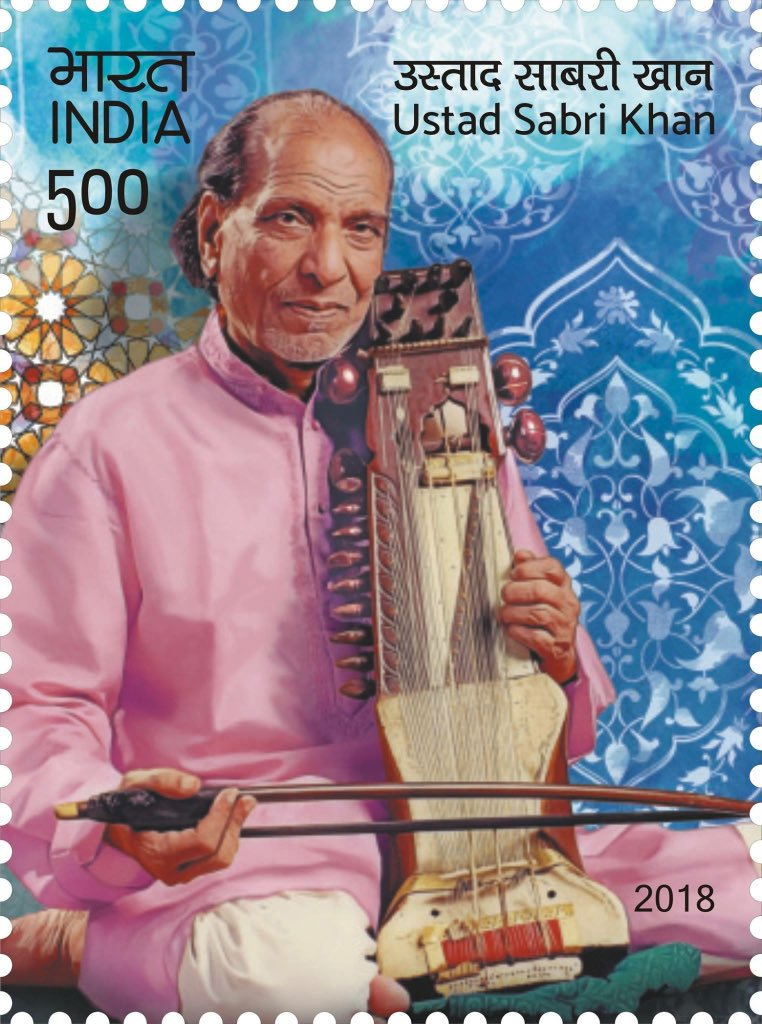
- Sabri Khan on a 2018 stamp of India

Background information
- Born: 21 May 1927; Moradabad, Uttar Pradesh, India
- Died: 1 December 2015 (aged 88) New Delhi, Delhi, India
- Genres: Indian classical music, Hindustani classical music
- Instrument: Sarangi

Ustad Sabri Khan (21 May 1927 – 1 December 2015) was an Indian sarangi player, who was descended on both sides of his family from a line of distinguished musicians.

== Early life ==
Sabri Khan was born on 21 May 1927 in Moradabad, Uttar Pradesh, British India. He belonged to the Sainia Gharana. This Gharana traces the tradition of its music back to Mian Tansen, the great vocalist in the court of Mughal Emperor Akbar. He had been initiated into sarangi-playing by his grandfather, Ustad Haji Mohammed Khan and later continued his training under his father Ustad Chajju Khan, both accomplished sarangi exponents of their time. Khan also learned some key sarangi techniques from his uncle Ustad Laddan Khan of Rampur.

== Music career ==
Sabri Khan played the sarangi with vocalist musicians on All India Radio and also served as a staff artiste there. He accompanied the noted sitar player Ravi Shankar and tabla player Alla Rakha on their tour of the United States in the early 1960s.

Sabri Khan toured extensively and performed in Afghanistan, Pakistan, China, Japan, USSR, United States, Canada, England, France, Germany, the Netherlands, Belgium, Italy, Spain, the Czech Republic, Slovakia, Bulgaria, Sweden, Norway, Finland and Mexico. The credit of introducing the Sarangi to American and European audiences goes to Sabri Khan. He also played a duet with violinist Yehudi Menuhin and was invited as a visiting professor by the University of Washington, Seattle, United States in 1981.

In appreciation of his contribution to the Classical Music of India, Ustad Sabri Khan received the Sahitya Kala Parishad Award, UP, Sangeet Natak Academy Award, National Sangeet Natak Academy Award (1986), the Padma Shree Award (1992) and Padma Bhushan Award (2006) by the President of India – Government of India.

== Family ==
Ustad Sabri Khan Sahib has four sons (1) Sarwar Sabri (2) Jamal Sabri (3) Kamal Sabri (4) Gulfam Sabri, and five daughters. He has many grandsons playing musical instruments: Suhail Yusuf Khan (Sarangi), Faisal Yusuf Khan (Tabla), Shariq Khan (Tabla), Junaid (Guitar) and Nabeel Khan (Sarangi).

== Death and legacy ==
In the early morning on 1 December 2015, Ustad Sabri Khan died surrounded by his family at his home in New Delhi at age 88.

== Awards and honours ==
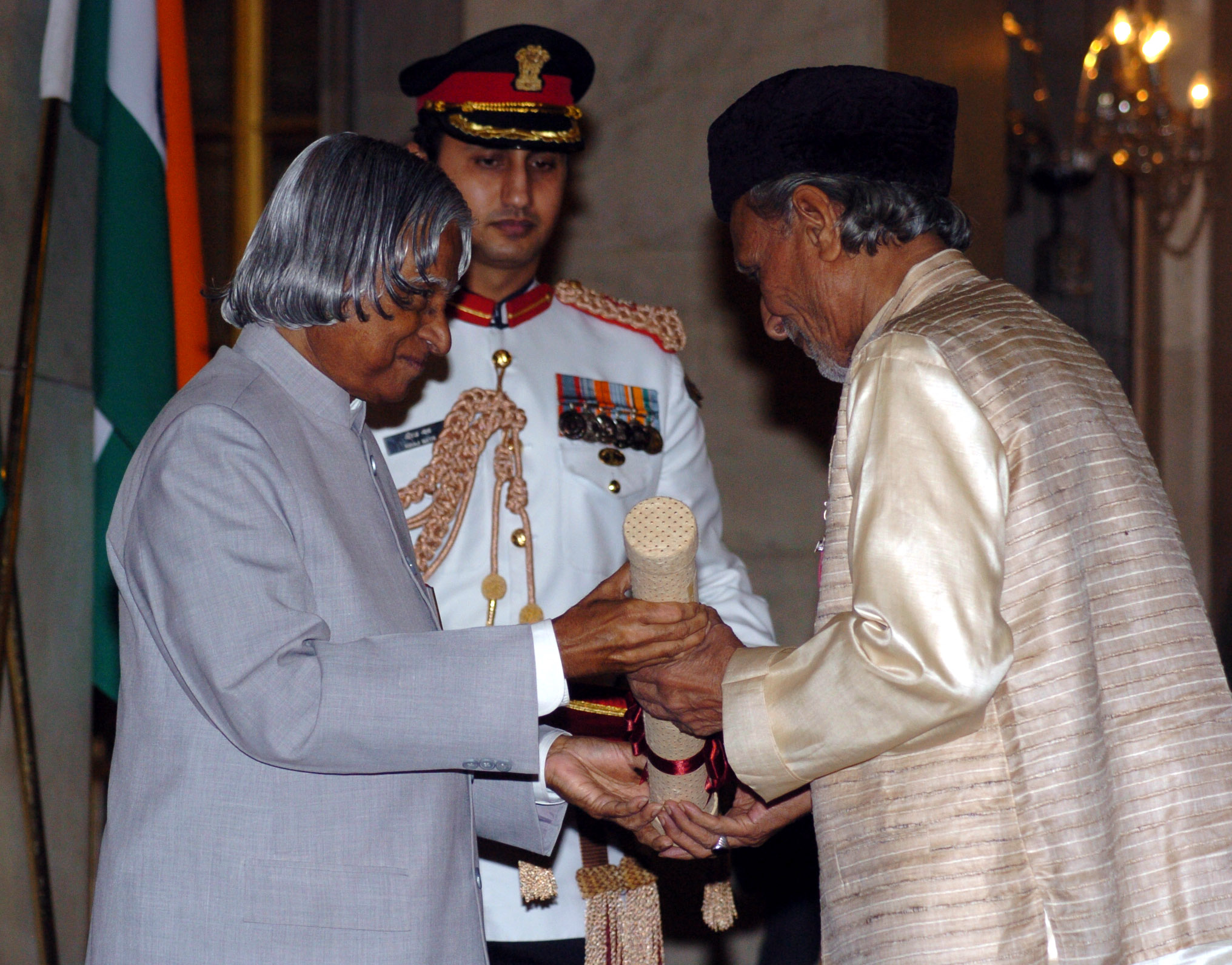
Sabri Khan receiving Padma Bhushan from the President Dr. A.P.J. Abdul Kalam.

- Sahitya Kala Parishad Award
- Shobhna Kala Sangam Award – 1985
- Begum Akhtar Award
- Sangeet Natak Akademi Award – 1986
- Uttar Pradesh Sangeet Natak Academy Award, Lucknow, UP – 1990
- Padma Shree Award by the President of India, Government of India – 1992
- Ustad Chand Khan Award – 2002
- Sangeet Bhushan Award – 2002
- Lifetime Achievement Award – LEGENDS OF INDIA – DMA – Delhi – 2003
- National Artist Award – All India Radio Prasar Bharti Award – 2004
- Padma Bhushan Award by the President of India, Government of India – 2006
- Sangeet Natak Akademi Tagore Ratna Award – 2012
