= Animal Heart =

Studio album by Nina Persson
- Released: January 29, 2014
- Recorded: 2013 at Vinegar Hill Sound; Svenska Grammofonstudion; Carousel Studios; Swedish Harlem, NYC and Valiant Effort Labs
- Genre: Alternative rock, indie pop
- Length: 41:15
- Label: Lojinx, The End Records
- Producer: Nina Persson, Nathan Larson, Eric D. Johnson

Animal Heart is the debut studio album by Nina Persson, singer of The Cardigans, released on February 10, 2014 through Lojinx in Europe and The End Records in North America. A video for the title track of the album was released in November 2013.

== Critical reception ==
Professional ratings
Aggregate scores
Source	Rating
Metacritic	68/100
Review scores
Source	Rating
AllMusic	4/5 stars
Drowned in Sound	5/10
The Irish Times	3/5 stars
The Line of Best Fit	6/10
Mojo	3/5 stars
Pitchfork	5.5/10
PopMatters	6/10
Q	4/5 stars
Uncut	7/10
Under the Radar	7/10

Critical reception of the album has been generally positive. At Metacritic, which assigns a normalized rating out of 100 to reviews from mainstream critics, the album received an average score of 68, based on 10 reviews, which indicates "generally favorable reviews".

== Track listing ==
All tracks are written by Eric D. Johnson, Nathan Larson and Nina Persson; except "Food for the Beast" by Joan Wasser.

No.	Title	Length
1.	"Animal Heart"	4:30
2.	"Burning Bridges for Fuel"	4:15
3.	"Dreaming of Houses"	3:27
4.	"Clip Your Wings"	3:58
5.	"Jungle"	3:35
6.	"Food for the Beast"	3:20
7.	"Digestif"	0:42
8.	"Forgot to Tell You"	3:56
9.	"Catch Me Crying"	3:19
10.	"The Grand Destruction Game"	3:55
11.	"Silver"	3:41
12.	"This Is Heavy Metal"	2:38
13.	"Sometimes" (Japanese bonus track)	2:55

== Personnel ==
Credits adapted from AllMusic.

Musicians

- Nina Persson – vocal and instrumental performance, production
- Nathan Larson – bass guitar, electric guitar, lap steel guitar, percussion, pump organ, synthesizer, vibraphone, background vocals, engineer, production
- Eric D. Johnson – autoharp, bass guitar, acoustic guitar, electric guitar, lap steel guitar, percussion, piano, pump organ, synthesizer, background vocals, engineer, production
- Brian Kantor – drums (1 to 5, 7 to 9, 11, 12)
- Bengt Lagerberg – drums (6, 10)

Technical personnel

- Sophie Bille Brahe – illustration
- Kalle Gustafsson – engineer
- Annele Hencz – publicity
- Nicholas Johansson – A&R
- Fred Kevorkian – mastering
- Joe McGinty – engineer
- Thom Monahan – mixing
- Staffan Persson – engineer
- Jörgen Ringstrand – photography
- Geoff Sanoff – engineer
- Barry Taylor – management
- Jessica Weitz – management

== Album charts ==
Chart (2013)	Peak position
Danish Albums (Hitlisten)	14
Finnish Albums (Suomen virallinen lista)	19
Swedish Albums (Sverigetopplistan)	2
UK Albums (OCC)	120
UK Independent Albums (OCC)	23

== Release history ==
Country	Date	Format	Label
Japan	January 29, 2014	CD, digital download	Nippon Columbia
Sweden	January 29, 2014	CD, digital download, LP	Universal
Taiwan	February 10, 2014	CD, digital download	Love Da Records
United Kingdom	February 10, 2014	CD, digital download, LP	Lojinx
Hong Kong	February 11, 2014	CD, digital download	Love Da Records
United States	February 11, 2014	CD, digital download, LP	The End Records
