= Nina Persson =

Swedish singer (born 1974)

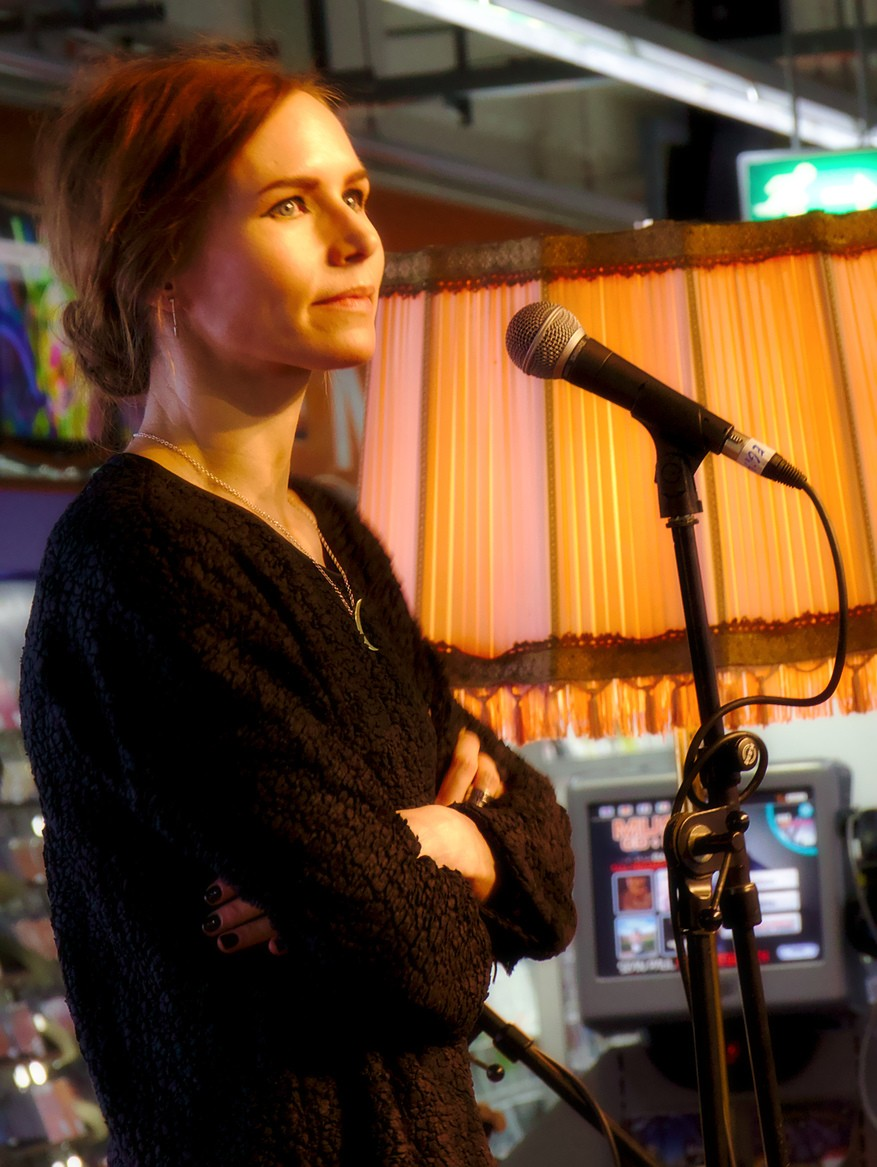
- Persson in 2014

Background information
- Born: Nina Elisabet Persson; 6 September 1974 (age 52); Örebro, Närke, Sweden
- Origin: Jönköping, Småland, Sweden
- Genres: Indie pop; indie rock; alternative rock
- Occupation: Musician
- Instruments: Vocals, keyboards
- Years active: 1992–present
- Labels: Lojinx; The End
- Member of: The Cardigans; A Camp

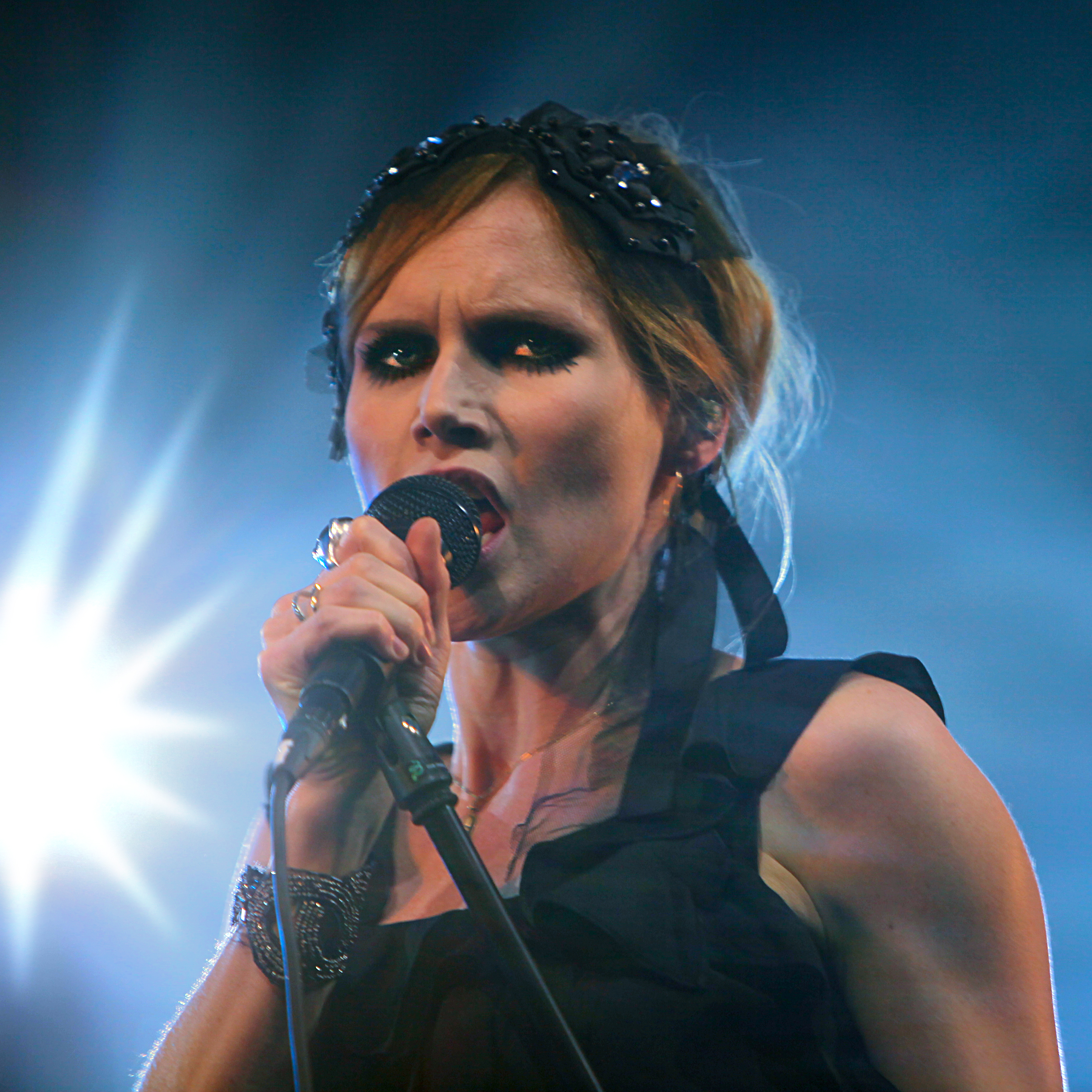
Nina Persson at Stockholm Pride-festival, July 2009.

Nina Elisabet Persson (Swedish: [ˈnîːna ˈpæ̌ːʂɔn]; born 6 September 1974) is a Swedish musician who is the lead singer and lyricist of the rock band The Cardigans. She has also released two albums as A Camp and one under her own name, and has appeared as a guest artist with other acts.

== Early life ==
Persson was born on 6 September 1974, and grew up in Jönköping, Sweden. "I grew up in a middle-class, academic family," Persson said in 2014: "I lived in a villa with a garden. I had two younger brothers."

She did not want to be a musician growing up, having an interest in art instead, which resulted in her attending art school. "I never really strived to be a musician; I was just, sort of, recruited into this band. I was bored out of my mind in this small, safe place (Jönköping). I was like, 'Awesome, I get to hang with fun guys.'"

== Career ==
Persson made her acting debut in the film Om Gud vill which was released in 2006.

She appears on the Manic Street Preachers song "Your Love Alone Is Not Enough", which reached #2 on the UK chart, on the album Send Away the Tigers. She also features on the 2009 Sparklehorse/Danger Mouse collaboration Dark Night of the Soul singing "Daddy's Gone".

Persson's first solo album released under her own name, Animal Heart, was released on 10 February 2014 on the independent British record label Lojinx Records.

In 2016, Persson appeared as a guest vocalist on the Local Natives song "Dark Days," singing the second verse.

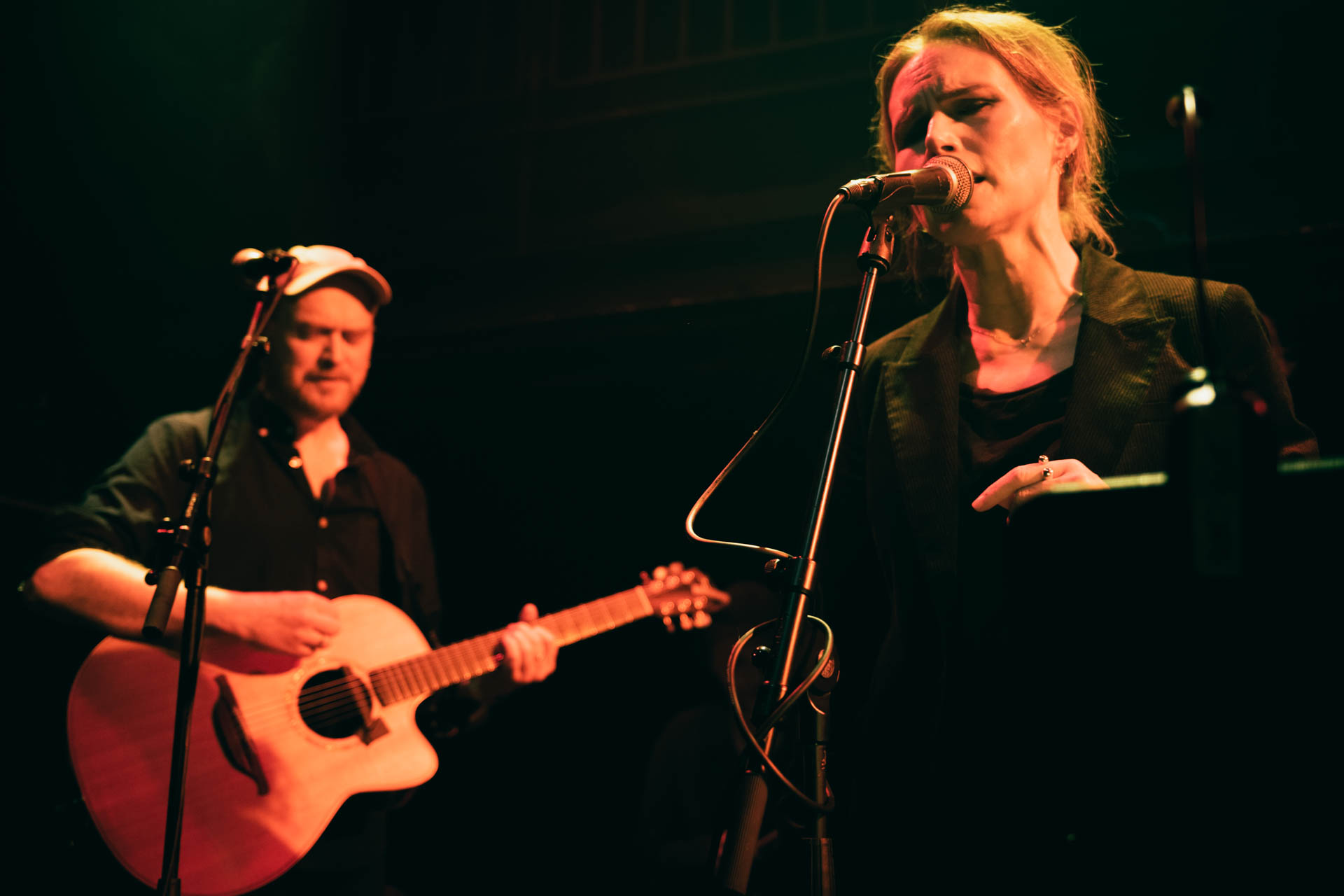
James Yorkston, Nina Persson and The Second Hand Orchestra in 2023

In October 2022, Domino Recording Company posted a single by James Yorkston, Persson and The Secondhand Orchestra called "Hold Out For Love." The track was from the forthcoming album The Great White Sea Eagle. She worked with James Yorkston and Karl-Jonas Winqvist of The Second Hand Orchestra on that album in Malmo. She toured in the UK with them in 2022 and 2023.

In 2025, Yorkston and Persson released a second album-length collaboration, Songs for Nina and Johanna. The pair embarked on a UK tour in support of the album.

She has said that the Cardigans may reform occasionally to play together, but there are no plans to work in a studio to create new music together.

== Personal life ==
On 16 June 2001, Persson married American songwriter and author Nathan Larson.

Persson was diagnosed with cervical cancer, which was in remission as of 2013.

After three attempts at in vitro fertilization, their son was born on 30 September 2010. For several years the family resided in Harlem, New York City, but in 2015 they decided to relocate to Malmö, the former base of the Cardigans. In an interview with Swedish daily Dagens Nyheter in March 2018, Persson talked about her expatriate years and the return to Sweden. She pointed out that the return to her native country was family business and did not reflect any wish to reboot her old band.

== Discography ==
=== Studio albums ===
List of studio albums, with selected chart positions and certifications
Title	Album details	Peak chart positions				Certifications
Title	Album details	SWE	DEN	FIN	UK	Certifications
Animal Heart	Released: 29 January 2014; Label: Lojinx, The End Records; Formats: CD, LP, digital download	2	14	19	120	

=== Singles ===
- 1996: "Desafinado" (Japanese-only release)
- 2000: "Theme from 'Randall & Hopkirk (Deceased)", Nina Persson & David Arnold (#49 on UK singles chart)
- 2007: "Your Love Alone Is Not Enough", Manic Street Preachers feat. Nina Persson (#2 on UK singles chart)
- 2014: "Animal Heart"
- 2014: "Sometimes"
- 2015: "The Legacy (Theme Song)"
- 2018: "Var ligger Sverige?" (feat. Thomas Öberg, Moto Boy & !Regeringen)
- 2018: "Ligg Lågt" (feat. Thomas Öberg, Moto Boy, !Regeringen & Selma Modéer Wiking)

=== Soundtracks ===
- 2014: "Tänk Om... Musiken Från Filmen"
- 2015: "What if... (Original Motion Picture Soundtrack What if...)"

=== Collaborations and soundtrack appearances ===
Year	Song Title	Main Artist	Album
1996	"Autumn Waltz"	Scents	Scents
1996	"Desafinado"	Nina Persson	12 Standards
1998	"Som Glas"	Fläskkvartetten	Jag Ger Vad Som Helst För Lite Solsken
1998	"Appalachian Lullaby"	Shudder To Think	First Love, Last Rites OST
1998	"J’en Ai Marre D’être Bleu"	Mathieu Boogaerts	J’en Ai Marre D’être Deux
1999	"Is It Really Real?"	Nathan Larson	I Am Not Scared (Promo)
1999	"What the Hell Are You Crying For?"	Nathan Larson	Desert Blue OST
1999	"The Bluest Eyes in Texas"	Nina Persson	Boys Don't Cry OST
2000	"Theme From Randall & Hopkirk (Deceased)"	Nina Persson	Randall and Hopkirk OST
2000	"Lid"	Ray Wonder	A New Kind of Love
2001	"Losing My Religion"	Nina Persson & Nathan Larson	Lad De Små Børn OST
2001	"Gold Day"	Sparklehorse	It's A Wonderful Life
2001	"Apple Bed"	Sparklehorse	It's A Wonderful Life
2001	"Just Because a Man Expects Me To"	Nathan Larson	Jealous God
2001	"Exit Smiling"	Nathan Larson & Patrik Bartosch	The Château OST
2002	"Bängen Trålar"	Soundtrack of Our Lives	Nationalsånger
2003	"Friends"	Backyard Babies	Stockholm Syndrome
2004	"Dirty Love"	Division of Laura Lee	Das Not Compute
2004	"Fiction"	Nathan Larson	FilmMusik
2004	"Le Pont De La Tristesse" (a.k.a. "Creme Fresh (Moods)")	Nathan Larson	FilmMusik
2004	"Miss You"	Marit Bergman	Baby Dry Your Eyes
2004	"Outro"	Marit Bergman	Baby Dry Your Eyes
2004	"Prom Night"	Sir Eric Beyond	The Beauty of Nature EP
2005	"You Hate My Beautiful Love"	Monkeystrikes	You Hate My Beautiful Love
2005	"Flyg Min Väg"	Freddie Wadling	Jag är Monstret
2005	"Aviva Pastoral"	Nathan Larson	Palindromes OST
2005	"Lullaby (Aviva's and Henrietta's Theme)"	Nathan Larson	Palindromes OST
2005	"Up on a Cloud"	Nathan Larson	Palindromes OST
2005	"Roaring 40's"	Christian Kjellvandar	Faya
2005	"Little Fish Theme"	Nathan Larson	Little Fish OST
2006	"Angel's Fall (Sorry Angel)"	Nina Persson	Monsieur Gainsbourg Revisited
2006	"Dead Leaves and the Dirty Ground"	Nina Persson	Om Gud Vill OST
2006	"Itämaista Rakkautta (Oriental Love)"	Nina Persson	Om Gud Vill OST
2006	"Black Winged Bird"	Nina Persson	The Cake Sale
2007	"Your Love Alone Is Not Enough"	Manic Street Preachers	Send Away the Tigers
2007	"Your Love Alone... (Nina Solo Acoustic)"	Manic Street Preachers	Your Love Alone Is Not Enough
2007	"Vänner"	Svante Thuresson	Svante Thuresson och Vänner
2008	"Land of a Thousand Dances"	Dave Cloud & The Gospel of Power	Pleasure Before Business
2008	"Baby You Got Me Wrong"	Florian Horwath	Sleepyhead
2008	"Why'd You Come in Here Looking Like That?"	Jill Johnson	Music Row
2009	"Electric Flowers" (w/ RZA)	N.A.S.A.	The Spirit of Apollo
2009	"Tears from a Child's Eye"	Nicolai Dunger	Play
2009	"Daddy's Gone"	Dangermouse/Sparklehorse	Dark Night of the Soul
2009	"Electraglide"	Aurelio Valle	Tender Parasites OST
2009	"Lament Of Belles"	Nathan Larson	Lula Magazine
2010	"Brothers in Arms"	Georg Wadenius	Reconnection
2010	"The Blues"	Primary 1	Record Store Day 10"
2011	"Cowboys and Hobos"	Nathan Larson	My Idiot Brother OST
2011	"The End of the Line" (Recorded 1997)	Lars Bygden	Songs I Wrote
2011	"Jolene"	Dollykollot	Dollykollot
2011	"Daddy Was An Old Time Preacher Man"	Dollykollot	Dollykollot
2011	"The Weed Had Got There First"	Dollykollot	Dollykollot
2011	"Place I Love"	Nathan Larson	Dark Horse OST
2012	"Make Believe"	James Iha	Look to the Sky
2012	"Till Next Tuesday"	James Iha	Look to the Sky
2012	"I Swung the Election"	The Citizens Band	Grab a Root and Growl
2014	"Heat"	Brothers of End	Shakers Love
2014	"Fight Song (God's Pocket)"	Nathan Larson	God's Pocket OST
2015	"Static"	Ben Lee	A Mixtape From Ben Lee
2016	"Come Give Me Love"	Timo Räisänen	Timo sjunger Ted
2016	"Saturday"	Nina Persson	Hello Mark Linkous - A Tribute to Sparklehorse
2016	"Dark Days"	Local Natives	Sunlit Youth
2017	"Dead for Seconds"	Moto Boy	NEW MUSIC
2022	"Hold Out For Love"	James Yorkston with The Second Hand Orchestra	The Great White Sea Eagle

== See also ==
- The Cake Sale
