= Big Eyes Family Players =

- Origin: Sheffield, England
- Genres: Experimental music, Folk music
- Labels: Domino Records, Home Assembly Music, Karate Body Records, Pickled Egg Records, Rusted Rail, Static Caravan Recordings,
- Members: James Green; Heather Ditch; James Street; Neal Heppleston; Guy Whittaker
- Past members: Ellie Bond; Andrew Brown; Bela Emerson; Elodie Ginsbourg; Gemma Green; David Jaycock; Mark Rimmer; Neil Shumsky; Aby Vulliamy; Katherine Wood; Sharron Kraus
- Website: www.big-eyes.co.uk

The Big Eyes Family Players / Big Eyes Family are a group from Sheffield, UK, formed in 1999 by multi-instrumentalist James Green. They initially recorded experimental music under the name Big Eyes, but in 2006 they changed their name and began to venture more into folk and traditional music. They are best known for two albums of traditional material: Folk Songs, which they released in collaboration with the Scottish singer-songwriter James Yorkston on Domino Records in 2009; and the follow-up, Folk Songs II, featuring a variety of guest vocalists and released on Static Caravan Recordings in 2012.

== Formation and early recordings as Big Eyes ==
Multi-instrumentalist James Green formed Big Eyes in Sheffield in 1999 as a solo experiment, making experimental instrumental music. Under this name, and with a rotating line up of other musicians, notably guitarist David Jaycock, he released the albums Big Eyes Songs (2000), Clumsy Music (2001), Love Is Gone Mad (2002) and We Have No Need For Voices When Our Hearts Can Sing (2004), as well as the three-track EP I See Creatures (2003), all via the Leicester-based label, Pickled Egg Records.

== Do The Musiking ==
In 2006, the group expanded their name to the Big Eyes Family Players and released the ambitious 29-track album Do the Musiking, featuring guest musicians such as James Yorkston, Rachel Grimes (Rachel's) and Jeremy Barnes (Neutral Milk Hotel, A Hawk and a Hacksaw). A mixture of avant-garde and folk music, the 78-minute collection drew the attention of Pitchfork, who said, "One ... benefit of the Family Players' ever-shifting strategy and personnel is that none of Do the Musiking's weaker ideas is able to linger for long, allowing each new track to present another open range of almost limitless possibility."

== Folk Songs and Folk Songs II ==
In August 2009, the Big Eyes Family Players collaborated once again with James Yorkston on the album Folk Songs. As the title suggests, all of the tracks are traditional British and Irish folk songs (along with one from Galicia, Spain). Many of them are versions of songs recorded by singers in the 1960s British folk revival, such as Nic Jones, Anne Briggs and Shirley Collins.

The album received generally positive reviews from the music press. Writing in The Guardian, Robin Denselow called it, "One of the more intriguing folk albums of the summer", commenting, "It's an album of strong songs, and may well prompt a new audience to check out the earlier recordings." The website The Quietus said the album was, "a fine tribute to the folk tradition of a musician taking long established songs, putting his own mark on the tested formulas and then passing them on for consumption by whoever encounters them along the road."

In 2012, the group released a follow-up album entitled Folk Songs II on Static Caravan Recordings, credited to The Big Eyes Family Players & Friends and featuring a variety of guest vocalists including Yorkston, Alasdair Roberts, Elle Osborne and Adrian Crowley. The Quietus described it as "a richer and more varied listening experience" than the first album, ascribing this to the variety of vocalists on the songs.

== Other Big Eyes Family Players releases ==
As well as the two Folk Songs albums, the Big Eyes Family Players have continued to release other albums, including Warm Room (2009) and Family Favourites (2011), the latter featuring reworked versions of some of their old songs. In 2015, a new album entitled Oh! was released, with songwriting shared by Green and vocalist Heather Ditch. In a very positive review, Folk Radio UK said, "They have never been a straight folk band, despite the traditional albums of the past. Rather, they have a pop sensibility and an individuality that allows them to appropriate many genres without being in thrall to any of them ... it becomes clear that they are at the very top of their game, and that ‘Oh’ is perhaps their finest album to date."

== Discography ==
=== Big Eyes ===
- Big Eyes Songs (Pickled Egg Records), 2000
- Clumsy Music (Pickled Egg Records), 2001
- Love Is Gone Mad (Pickled Egg Records), 2002
- I See Creatures (Pickled Egg Records), 2003
- We Have No Need For Voices When Our Hearts Can Sing (Pickled Egg Records), 2004

=== Big Eyes Family Players ===
- Do The Musiking (Pickled Egg Records), 2006
- Donkeysongs (Rusted Rail), 2008
- Folk Songs (Domino Records), 2009 (with James Yorkston)
- Warm Room (Pickled Egg Records), 2009
- Family Favourites (Karate Body Records), 2011
- Folk Songs II (Static Caravan Recordings), 2012 (as Big Eyes Family Players & Friends)
- Oh! (Home Assembly Music), 2015

=== Big Eyes Family ===
- The Disappointed Chair (Sonido Polifonico), 2020
