= Just Beyond the River =

Studio album by James Yorkston and the Athletes
- Released: 16 November 2004
- Genre: Folk
- Length: 48:30
- Label: Domino
- Producer: Kieran Hebden

James Yorkston and the Athletes chronology
Moving Up Country (2002)	Just Beyond the River (2004)	The Year of the Leopard (2006)

Professional ratings
Review scores
Source	Rating
AllMusic	link
Pitchfork	7.6/10 link
Uncut	link

Just Beyond the River is the second studio album by James Yorkston and the Athletes. It was released on 16 November 2004 through Domino Recording Company. The album was released on 12" vinyl and on CD, initial copies of the CD came with a 3-track CD of folk standards and original compositions, entitled Fearsome Fairytale Lovers. The album was produced by Kieran Hebden (aka Four Tet).

== Track listing ==
1. "Heron"
2. "Shipwreckers"
3. "Surf Song"
4. "Hermitage"
5. "Hotel"
6. "This Time Tomorrow"
7. "Banjo #1"
8. "We Flew Blind"
9. "Edward" (traditional)
10. "Banjo #2"
11. "The Snow It Melts the Soonest" (traditional)

=== Fearsome Fairytale Lovers (Bonus CD) ===
1. "Lowlands Away" / "Don't Leave Home"
2. "Fearsome Fairytale Lover" / "Safe Havers"
3. "Under the Moon" / "Higher Germanie"

== Personnel ==
- James Yorkston – Banjo, bouzouki, guitar, arranger, concertina, vocals
- Jon Bews – Fiddle, violin
- Wendy Chan – Vocals
- Kieran Hebden – Slide guitar
- Doogie Paul – Bass, bouzouki, percussion, glockenspiel, vocals
- Faisal Rahman – Dulcimer, banjo, percussion
- Holly Taylor – Low whistle, small pipes
- Reuben Taylor – Piano, accordion, harpsichord, glass

=== Technical personnel ===
- Matthew Cooper – Design
- Sean Dooley – Design, photography
- Kieran Hebden – Producer
- Sean Mage – Mastering
- David Wench – Engineer
