= The Wide, Wide River =

Studio album by James Yorkston and the Second Hand Orchestra
- Released: 22 January 2021
- Genre: Folk
- Length: 39:47
- Label: Domino
- Producer: James Yorkston; Karl-Jonas Winqvist

James Yorkston chronology
The Route to the Harmonium (2018)	The Wide, Wide River (2021)	The Great White Sea Eagle (2023)

The Wide, Wide River is an album by the Scottish singer-songwriter James Yorkston, recorded in collaboration with the Swedish collective The Second Hand Orchestra. Produced by Yorkston and Karl-Jonas Winqvist, it was released by Domino Records in January 2021.

== Background ==
The Second Hand Orchestra are a Swedish music collective, led by Karl-Jonas Winqvist and featuring guitarist Peter Morén of the pop band Peter Bjorn and John. The songs were recorded over two studio sessions, with the band not having heard the material prior to recording.

== Critical reception ==
Professional ratings
Aggregate scores
Source	Rating
AnyDecentMusic?	7.1/10
Metacritic	82/100
Review scores
Source	Rating
AllMusic	4/5 stars
Clash	8/10
Evening Standard	4/5 stars
Loud and Quiet	8/10
PopMatters	7/10

The Wide Wide River was met with "universal acclaim" reviews from critics. At Metacritic, which assigns a weighted average rating out of 100 to reviews from mainstream publications, this release received an average score of 82 based on 6 reviews. AnyDecentMusic? gave the release a 7.1 out of 10 based on 7 reviews.

The album received positive reviews from the music press. In a review for AllMusic, Timothy Monger wrote: "Spontaneity has always been an element of Yorkston's style, but the loose group-mind feel captured here yields appealingly fresh and intimate results. Against his half-spoken musings, a celestial array of jangling guitars, strings, and flutes play out, lifting the music up in a Scottish-Scandinavian communion of burgeoning friendship." Folk Radio UK praised the improvisatory feel of the music, saying, "There is space all over this album – thinking space, breathing space – space to be interpreted by the musicians and also by listeners", and describing the album as a "career highlight" for Yorkston. The London Evening Standard said the album's tracks are "hopeful experiments that have the warm, relaxed feel of a Scottish pub’s improv session." Clash magazine rated the album 8/10 and said, "But the music! It’s contagious joy to hear players with such abandon and intuition, braiding their lines together..."

Writing for Loud and Quiet, Sam Reid gave a 7 out of 10, explaining: "Two things are going on here. Yorkston's original songs – all vocal inflections and lyrical specificity – were all written before recording. Then there’s the Second Hand Orchestra, improvising as they go."

== Track listing ==
All tracks are written by James Yorkston, unless noted

No.	Title	Length
1.	"Ella Mary Leather"	3:05
2.	"To Soothe Her Wee Bit Sorrows"	7:34
3.	"Choices, Like Wide Rivers"	2:45
4.	"Struggle"	6:35
5.	"There Is No Upside"	6:42
6.	"A Droplet Forms"	3:47
7.	"A Very Old Fashioned Blues"	5:07
8.	"We Test The Beams"	4:12
Total length:		39:47

== Performers ==
- James Yorkston – vocals (1–8), guitar (2–8), piano (1)
- Karl-Jonas Winqvist – drums (3), percussion (1,2,4–8), bells (5), vocals (3,5)
- Emma Nordenstam – cello (1,2,4,8), piano (3,5–7), vocals (1,3,4,6,7)
- Daniel Bengtsson – bass guitar (1,4,6,7)
- Peter Morén – electric guitar (1,4,6,7), vocals (1,4,7)
- Ulrika "Ullis" Gyllenberg – violin (1–8), vocals (3)
- Cecilia Österholm – nyckelharpa (1,4,6,7), vocals (7)
- Per Lager – drums (1,2,4–8)
- Felix Wickman – electric guitar (2), omnichord (5), vocals (1,3,7)
- Lars Frederick Swahn – bass guitar (2,3,5,8), electric guitar (5), keyboards (2,5), vocals (5)
- Ylva Ceder – English horn (8), vocals (3)
- Lina Langendorf – flute (4,6)
- Daniel "Våldet" Holmström – flugelhorn (8)
