= Moving Up Country =

Studio album by James Yorkston and the Athletes
- Released: 4 June 2002
- Genre: Folk music
- Length: 48:30
- Label: Domino
- Producer: Simon Raymonde

James Yorkston and the Athletes chronology
Moving Up Country (2002)	Just Beyond the River (2004)

Professional ratings
Review scores
Source	Rating
AllMusic	link

Moving Up Country is an album by James Yorkston and the Athletes.

Released in June 2002, Moving Up Country is the debut studio album by James Yorkston and the Athletes. The album was produced by Yorkston and released on vinyl and on CD by Domino Records. Among the musicians are Fence Collective luminaries Lone Pigeon and King Creosote.

== Critical reception ==
The album received positive reviews from the music press. The Independent called it "an expansive and delicately arranged collection", saying it was "one of the most rewarding and unexpected pleasures of the year." NME, meanwhile, said, "It ain’t rocket science: just the very welcome sound of a country boy made good."

== Reissue ==
In 2012, to celebrate the tenth anniversary of the album, Domino Records reissued it in an expanded edition. The ten-minute, non-album single "The Lang Toun" was added, along with a bonus disc featuring demos and a BBC John Peel session. Drowned in Sound said of the package: "Moving Up Country deserves to be remembered as one of the noughties’ finest records, and with the help of these fascinating extra tracks, this reissue should see that become reality."

== Track listing ==
1. "In Your Hands"
2. "St. Patrick"
3. "Sweet Jesus"
4. "Tender to the Blues"
5. "Moving Up Country, Roaring the Gospel"
6. "Cheating the Game"
7. "I Spy Dogs"
8. "6:30 Is Just Way Too Early"
9. "The Patience Song"
10. "I Know My Love"
11. "The Lang Toun" (10th Anniversary Edition only)

=== 10th Anniversary Edition bonus disc ===
1. "I Spy Dogs" (demo)
2. "6:30 Is Just Way Too Early" (demo)
3. "Cheating The Game" (demo)
4. "The Patience Song" (demo)
5. "My Distance Travelled" (demo)
6. "Easily Led" (demo)
7. "Saviour-A-Saving" (demo)
8. "They'll Be Telling Me You're A Lady" (demo)
9. "Worthy Souls" (demo)
10. "Catching Eyes" (demo)
11. "St. Patrick" (John Peel session)
12. "Tender To The Blues" (John Peel session)
13. "La Magnifica" (John Peel Session)
14. "6:30 Is Just Way Too Early" (John Peel Session)
15. "Moving Up Country, Roaring The Gospel" (demo)

== Personnel ==
=== Musicians ===
- Rob Armstrong - Cittern (10)
- Jon Bews - Group Violins (2)
- Wendy Chan - Lead Violin (2), Violin (5,7), Vocals (8,10), Vibratone (9)
- King Creosote - Accordion (3), Vocals (3)
- Lone Pigeon - Vocals (3), Percussion (3)
- Doogie Paul - Bass (1,2,5–10), Vocals (5–7,9)
- Faisal Rahman - Percussion (1,2,4–11), Accordion (2,9), Vocals (5,9), Lap Steel (10), Harmonium (11)
- Simon Raymonde - Lap Steel (7)
- Holly Taylor - Whistle (2,5,9), Small Pipes (10,11)
- Reuben Taylor - Accordion (1,5,6,8), Concertina (1,4,11), Piano (2,5,7,10), String Arrangement (2,7), Hammond (2,8,9), Rhodes (4,8,9), Vocals (5,9), Z1 (9,10), Harmonium (10)
- James Yorkston - Guitar (1–11), Vocals (1–11), Bouzouki (1,5,8), Harmonica (1,5,8), Mandolin (2), Percussion (3,7,8), Bass (4), Clarinet (4), Banjo (6), Lap Steel (6), Double Bass (11)

=== Technical ===
- Kenny Anderson - Production (3), Recording (3)
- Matthew Cooper - Design
- Sean Dooley - Design, Photography
- Simon Raymonde - Production (1,2,4–10), Mixing (1–4,6–10)
- Reuben Taylor - Production (1,2,4–11), Recording (1,2,4–11), Mixing (5,11)
- James Yorkston - Production (1,2,4–11)
