= The Year of the Leopard =

Studio album by James Yorkston
- Released: 25 September 2006
- Genre: Folk
- Length: 40:30
- Label: Domino
- Producer: Rustin Man

James Yorkston chronology
Just Beyond the River (2004)	The Year of the Leopard (2006)	Roaring the Gospel (2007)

Professional ratings
Review scores
Source	Rating
AllMusic	4.5/5 stars
The Guardian	4/5 stars
Music Box	3.5/5 stars
The Skinny	4/5 stars
The Dwarf	4.5/5 stars

The Year of the Leopard is an album by James Yorkston.

Released on 25 September 2006 in the UK, The Year of the Leopard is the third studio album by Yorkston, though the first to be credited without his band The Athletes. The album was released on double 10" vinyl and on CD, initial copies of the CD came with a 6 track CD of demo recordings. The album was released in the USA on 23 January 2007.

== Track listing ==
1. "Summer Song"
2. "Steady As She Goes"
3. "The Year of the Leopard"
4. "5 a.m."
5. "Woozy With Cider"
6. "I Awoke"
7. "The Brussels Rambler"
8. "Orgiva Song"
9. "Don't Let Me Down"
10. "Us Late Travellers"

=== 2 x 10" Vinyl Only Tracks ===
1. "I Acknowledge the Devil"
2. "Buzzard"

=== Bonus acoustic demo CD ===
1. "5.a.m."
2. "Organ Song"
3. "Steady As She Goes"
4. "Thar She Blows"
5. "Us Late Travellers"
6. "The Year of the Leopard"

== Musicians ==
- James Yorkston - Vocals (1–10), Bouzouki (1,7), Clarinet (1–5,7,9,10), Concertina (1,2,7,8), Guitar (1–7,9,10)
- Jon Bews - Violin (1,2,4,6,9)
- Jenny Casino - Vocals (3,6)
- Doogie Paul - Double Bass (1,2,4,6,9,10), Banjo (6)
- Faisal Rahman - Percussion (1,2,6,7), Fender Rhodes (9), Lap Steel (10)
- Reporter - Electronics (5)
- Reuben Taylor - Concertina (2), Hammond Organ (2), Accordion (4,6,9), Hammond Pedals (4,9), Piano (4,6), Melodica (6)
- Paul Webb - Random Piano (5), Vocals (6), Hammond Organ (10)
