= Soheil =

Soheil is a male given name of Persian origin, and may refer to:

- Soheil Abedian (born 1949), Iranian-born Australian property developer
- Soheil Afnan (1904–1990), Palestinian-born Persian scholar of philosophy, Arabic, Persian, and Greek languages
- Soheil Asgharzad (born 1993), Iranian football midfielder
- Soheil Arabi (born 1985), Iranian blogger who was sentenced to death in Iran in 2013
- Soheil Arghandewall (born 2001), German professional footballer
- Soheil Ayari (born 1970), French-born Iranian race car driver
- Soheil Beiraghi (born 1986), Iranian independent film director, screenwriter and producer
- Soheil Haghshenas (born 1982), Iranian footballer
- Soheil Nasseri (born 1979), American pianist based in Berlin
- Soheil Shameli (born 1994), Iranian male squash player
- Soheil Rahmani (born 1988), Iranian footballer
- Soheil Vahedi (born 1989), Iranian former professional snooker player

== See also ==
- Soheil Mosun, a custom architectural manufacturer and design-build company headquartered in Toronto, Canada
- Souhail (disambiguation)
