= Robert Sandall =

British musician, journalist and radio presenter (1952–2010)

- Born: Robert Paul Sandall; 9 June 1952; Pinner, Middlesex, England
- Died: 20 July 2010 (aged 58); England
- Occupations: Radio presenter; journalist; musician

Robert Paul Sandall (9 June 1952 – 20 July 2010) was a British musician, music journalist and radio presenter. He was best known as co-presenter of BBC Radio 3's Mixing It and Late Junction programmes.

== Life ==
Sandall was born on 9 June 1952 in Pinner, Middlesex. In the late 1970s he was a singer and guitarist in London-based punk band Blunt Instrument, later known as London Zoo.

He wrote for Q, Rolling Stone, The Word and GQ magazines. After a brief period at The Daily Telegraph, in 1988 he became the rock critic for The Sunday Times.

From 1990 until 2007 he presented, with Mark Russell, BBC Radio 3's Mixing It programme. After ending on Radio 3 the show moved to Resonance FM in London, where it continued for a further two years under the name Where's the Skill in That?. Sandall was presenter of the BBC's music programme Late Junction, and contributed to BBC Radio 4's Front Row. He also worked at VH-1 UK on the Take It To The Bridge show in 1995, co-presenting with Pip Dann.

From 1996 to 2002, he was director of communications at Virgin Records.

== Personal life ==
Sandall was married to Anita Mackie. The couple had one daughter, Grace. He died after a long battle with prostate cancer.
