= I Was a Cat from a Book =

Studio album by James Yorkston
- Released: 13 August 2012
- Genre: Folk
- Label: Domino
- Producer: James Yorkston, David Wrench

James Yorkston chronology
Folk Songs (2009)	I Was a Cat from a Book (2012)	The Cellardyke Recording and Wassailing Society (2014)

I Was a Cat from a Book is an album by the Scottish singer-songwriter James Yorkston, released in 2012 on Domino Records. The album was co-produced by the Welsh singer David Wrench and features a guest appearance by Kathryn Williams.

== Critical reception ==
The album received generally positive reviews. The Line of Best Fit said, "Yorkston exposes and plays with his emotional connection to life around him, showing once again that he is able to put pen to paper in a way that his contemporaries can only dream of", while The Arts Desk praised "Yorkston’s well-crafted songs, swathed in atmospheric strings, and tinged with melancholy and mystery". Reviewing the album for Drowned in Sound, Aaron Lavery described it as "a James Yorkston record... with enough shading in the corners and drawing over the lines to add new sparks of interest," awarding it a score of 7 out of 10.

== Track listing ==
1. "Catch"
2. "Kath with Rhodes"
3. "Border Song"
4. "This Line Says"
5. "Just as Scared"
6. "Sometimes the Act of Giving Love"
7. "The Fire & the Flames"
8. "A Short Blues"
9. "Spanish Ants"
10. "Two"
11. "I Can Take All This"
12. "Black Horse White" (vinyl bonus track)

== Musicians ==
- James Yorkston - Voice (1-12), Guitar (1-8,10,11), Fender Rhodes (2,10), Programming (2), Autoharp (2,11), Banjo (2), Everything (9), Clarinet (10,11), Harmonium (10), Piano Insides (11)
- John Ellis - Piano (1,3,5,6,8,11), Fender Rhodes (6,7,11)
- Esme & Theo - Bells & Boo (3)
- Luke Flowers - Drums (1-3,5-8,11)
- Rachael Gladwin - Harp (1)
- Jill O'Sullivan - Voice (5)
- Sarah Scutt - Voice (2,7,8,12), Clarinet (3,5,7,8)
- Vince Sipprell - Viola (4), String Arrangement (4)
- Emma Smith - Violin (1,3-7,11), Vibraphone (1,2,6), Voice (1,12), String Arrangement (4), Soprano Saxophone (11), Tenor Horn (11)
- Jon Thorne - Double Bass (1-8,10,11)
- Marry Waterson - Voice (12)
- Kathryn Williams - Voice (2)
