= Roaring the Gospel =

Studio album by James Yorkston and the Athletes
- Released: 2007
- Genre: Folk
- Label: Domino

James Yorkston and the Athletes chronology
The Year of the Leopard (2006)	Roaring the Gospel (2007)	When the Haar Rolls In (2008)

Roaring the Gospel is a 2007 compilation album by James Yorkston and the Athletes. The album is made up of hard-to-find tracks from EPs, some that had been released overseas and a few new songs.

== Critical reception ==
The album received positive reviews in the press. The NME observed that "Yorkston has talent as deep as a mine shaft", while the BBC website said, "Yorkston and his Athletes bathe their songs with warmth, allowing them to nestle snugly in a lush bed of tenderly plucked acoustic guitars, sighing woodwind and gently wheezing accordion."

== Track listing ==
1. "A Man With My Skills"
2. "Someplace Simple"
3. "Blue Madonnas"
4. "Seven Streams"
5. "The Hills & the Heath"
6. "Song to the Siren"
7. "Moving Up Country, Roaring the Gospel"
8. "Blue Bleezin' Blind Drunk"
9. "Sleep is the Jewel"
10. "Are You Coming Home Tonight?"
11. "The Lang Toun"
12. "La Magnifica"
