= FortDax =

- Born: Darren Richard Durham; Beverley
- Origin: United Kingdom
- Genres: Electronica, Ambient, electro
- Years active: 2001–2006
- Labels: Static Caravan Recordings, Tugboat Records, Very Friendly, Resonant, Not On Label

FortDax was a recording alias of Darren Richard Durham, a composer active in the early 2000s. He was inspired by artists such as Charles Ives and ABBA and he has described FortDax as 'Michael Nyman trapped upside down in a clockwork palace during a snowstorm'. He is most well known for his remix of You Are Here when it became the theme tune of Newswipe with Charlie Brooker and Charlie Brooker's Weekly Wipe. After five years of working under the pseudonym FortDax, Darren announced that he was feeling boxed in by what was expected from FortDax and that it was time to try something new. Darren has recently started creating some new music under the moniker of Diverse Industries.

== Biography ==
Darren was active under the name FortDax from 2001 to 2006. A John Peel session in 2004 introduced him to a larger audience. He has also active creating a number of remixes. Darren also recorded a session for the BBC show Mixing It which went out on 24 March 2006. The session was recorded in London and Oxford during February 2006.

== Personal life ==
Darren was born in the town of Beverley and studied at Longcroft School, Coventry University, Sheffield Hallam University and Kingston University.

== Discography ==
=== Studio albums ===
Title	Album details
At Bracken	Released: 2002; Formats: Vinyl; Country: United Kingdom; Labels: Static Caravan Records; Catalogue number: VAN50
Folly	Released: April 7, 2003; Formats: CD; Country: United KingdomSpain; Labels: Tugboat Records, Sinnamon Records; Catalogue numbers: TUGCD032, SINCD17
Divers	Released: February 13, 2006; County: United Kingdom; Formats: CD; Labels: Very Friendly; Catalogue number: VF014CD

The art work for At Bracken was supplied by the illustrator David Hallangen a.k.a. Montelimar, who was producing artwork for Static Caravan Records at the time. David was responsible for a slight renaming of the track Like cream inside your spine in to The cream inside your spine when he mistitled it in the track's artwork, a mistake that Darren was happy to keep

=== Extended plays and singles ===
Title	Album details
August '75, Winter '76	Released: 2001; Formats: LP; Label: Resonant
Like Cream Inside Your Spine	Released: December 2001; Formats: LP; Label: Static Caravan Records; Catalogue number: VAN37
Untitled	Released: 2001; Formats: CD-R; Labels: Not On Record
A Beverley Mythic	Released: 2005; Formats: CD; Labels: Static Caravan Records; Catalogue number: VAN84

=== Compilations ===
Title	Album details
Witch Hazel Tales	Released: 2001; Formats: CD; Labels: Earworm

=== Remixes ===
Artist	Track	Year
Piano Magic	Certainty (FortDax Remix)	2002
Nathan Fake	You Are Here (FortDax Remix)	2006
Federico Romanzi	Amore E Psiche Set (FortDax Remix)	2009
