= Mixing It =

Radio program

Mixing It is a radio programme showcasing experimental music. Its original remit was to showcase "crossover" music that blurred the established boundaries between genres. It was originally broadcast as a weekly radio programme on BBC Radio 3 but was axed in 2007 when controller Roger Wright announced a revamped schedule.

The programme has since been broadcast by experimental radio station Resonance FM, where it was first renamed as MIXINGIT. However, the BBC objected as it had trademarked the title. The programme was then temporarily renamed as MyXINGIT. The following week, its new permanent title was announced: Where's The Skill In That? This is a favourite catchphrase of the programme, humorously said by the presenters to be a common reaction at production meetings when one presenter plays music that doesn't go down well with the other.

== History ==
Mixing It was presented by journalist Robert Sandall and musician Mark Russell. It generally lasted around 75 minutes. The first programme was broadcast in 1990, when its regular running time was usually only 45 minutes. Its regular timeslot then was on Monday evenings, and since then it has been broadcast on Saturdays, Sundays, and most recently Fridays. It has been nominated twice for a Sony Award, winning Silver in 1992 for an edition featuring an extended interview with Brian Eno. The show finished after 17 years on air on 9 February 2007 following Radio 3 controller Roger Wright's proposed schedule changes. A campaign by loyal listeners started in early 2007 to save the programme.

The programme's return on Resonance FM was announced on a message board post by Mark Russell. The first Resonance FM edition was broadcast on 28 February 2007, lasting one hour. A series began later in March, running until mid-June. The next series was set to begin in September 2007, but was delayed due to both presenters' other professional commitments. Mark Russell and Robert Sandall were also considering setting up a website and looking into the potential of producing podcasts. On 16 April 2008, the programme returned to a regular Wednesday 9-10pm slot on Resonance FM. Robert Sandall died on 20 July 2010 following a long battle with prostate cancer.

== Content and influences ==
The programme contains music based and concentrated on new and experimental music. Most shows featured a session which was either a pre-recorded studio set or excerpts of gigs. The show sometimes went travelling and had visited Madrid, Los Angeles, California, Iceland, Montreal, Barcelona, Brussels, Edinburgh, Berlin and Chicago for specials.

The show played a broad range of music including the type of music played by John Peel, The Breezeblock and Andy Kershaw as well as modern classical and improv music. The two presenters have different musical tastes which made for a varied playlist.

A variety of performers have performed or been interviewed on this show. They include:

- Aphex Twin
- Cicala Mvta
- Child of an Android
- Leafcutter John
- Seb Rochford
- Maja Ratkjo
- Madlib
- Yo La Tengo
- Brian Eno
- The Fall
- The Magnificents
- Stephin Merritt
- Radiohead
- cLOUDDEAD
- Bollywood Brass Band
- Zoviet*France
- Wevie Stonder
- An Pierle
- Kevin Blechdom
- Regina Spektor
- Matmos
- Max Tundra
- Samanda
- PJ Harvey
- Deerhoof
- Björk
- Vicki Bennett
- Rechenzentrum
- A Hawk and A Hacksaw
- Tanya Tagaq
- Paddy McAloon
- John Cale
- FortDax
