= The Hornblower Brothers =

English band

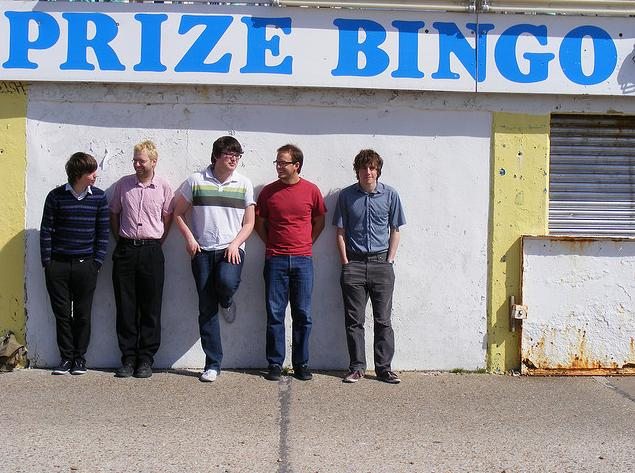
- The Hornblower Brothers, 2010

Background information
- Origin: Brighton, East Sussex, England
- Genres: Indie pop, indie folk, anti-folk
- Years active: 2007–2010, 2015–present
- Labels: Static Caravan Recordings / Pap Records / Bell Boy Records / One Inch Badge / Cherryade Records
- Members: Nathaniel Forrester; Alistair Johnstone; Michael Baser; John Stokdyk
- Past members: Gary Cox; James Emery; Antony Groves
- Website: The Hornblower Brothers on Bandcamp

The Hornblower Brothers are a four-piece band based in Brighton, England. Their debut EP Adventures in the National Geographic was released on Bell Boy Records in October 2009. They released the single "Give and Receivers" / "Ghost of Kerouac" on Static Caravan Recordings on 19 April 2010. In 2010 the band took a break before reforming early in 2015.

The Hornblower Brothers returned to action in 2016 with a new EP Free Range for Bleeding Heart Recordings, and a live session on Marc Riley's BBC Radio 6 Music. The band subsequently released the An Uncomprehensive Retrospective (2008–2016) compilation album and a follow-up single "Popping Round The Bend" on its own Pap Records label.

== Musical style ==
The Hornblower Brothers style has often been compared to Half Man Half Biscuit and Jeffrey Lewis, mainly due to the prominent use of satirical lyrics and an off-kilter pop style.

== Discography ==
Singles/EPs

- "Popping Round The Bend" / "Asthma Attack" – Pap Records (2018)
- Free Range EP – Bleeding Heart Recordings (2016)
- "Give and Receivers" / "The Ghost of Kerouac" – Static Caravan Recordings (19 April 2010)
- Adventures in the National Geographic – Bell Boy Records (2 November 2009)

Album

- An Uncomprehensive Retrospective (2008–2016) – Pap Records (2017)

Misc.

- Marc Riley live session on BBC 6 Music (2016)
- "Mossy Epitaph", on the compilation album Sea Monsters – One Inch Badge Records (2011)
- Marc Riley live session on BBC 6 Music (2010)
- "Christmas Song", on the compilation album A Very Cherry Christmas Volume 6 – Cherryade Records (2010)
- "Christmas Song", on the compilation album Krampus Is Coming – One Inch Badge Records (2009)

== Members ==
Current members

- Nathaniel Forrester – vocals, guitars, keyboards (2004–present)
- Alistair Johnstone – drums, percussion, guitar, vocals (2004–present)
- John Stokdyk – bass guitar, whistling (2015–present)
- Michael Baser – keyboards, melodica (2015–present)

Former members

- Gary Cox – keyboards, melodica (2005–2010)
- James Emery – bass guitar (2005–2010)
- Antony Groves – drums, percussion (2005–2010)
