= All of This Is Chance =

Studio album by Lisa O'Neill
- Released: 10 February 2023
- Genre: Folk
- Length: 42.17
- Label: Rough Trade

Lisa O'Neill chronology
Heard a Long Gone Song (2018)	All of This Is Chance (2023)

Singles from All of This Is Chance
- 1. "Old Note" Released: 15 November 2022

Professional ratings
Aggregate scores
Source	Rating
Metacritic	84/100
Review scores
Source	Rating
AllMusic	4/5 stars
The Observer	4/5 stars
PopMatters	7/10
Uncut	4.5/5 stars

All of This Is Chance is the fifth studio album by Irish singer-songwriter Lisa O'Neill. It was released on 10 February 2023 by Rough Trade Records.

== Critical reception ==
All of This Is Chance was met with "universal acclaim" reviews from critics. At Metacritic, which assigns a weighted average rating out of 100 to reviews from mainstream publications, this release received an average score of 84, based on 5 reviews.

Writing for AllMusic, James Christopher Monger wrote that O'Neill's "lilting, rough-hewn cadence carries with it the weight, strength, and spry humor of her homeland, and her storytelling rings true and grounded, even at its most mystic and confounding." Alex Brent of PopMatters wrote "All of This Is Chance sees O'Neill become more of a protagonist of her songs than an observer. While her previous work, Heard a Long Gone Song, was rightly praised for its evocative renditions of people, tradition, work, and life, this is more concerned with how its author relates to the world. As the title suggests, these questions are not to be addressed without a degree of world-weary cynicism."

== Track listing ==
All tracks are written by Lisa O'Neil.

All of This Is Chance track listing
No.	Title	Length
1.	"All of This Is Chance"	6:27
2.	"Silver Seed"	4:18
3.	"Old Note"	6:07
4.	"Birdy from Another Realm"	5:12
5.	"The Globe"	5:28
6.	"If I Was a Painter"	4:07
7.	"Whisht, the Wild Workings of the Mind"	6:53
8.	"Goodnight World"	3:45

== Charts ==
Chart performance for All of This Is Chance
Chart (2013)	Peak position
Irish Albums (OCC)	6
Scottish Albums (OCC)	22
UK Americana Albums (OCC)	1
UK Folk Albums (OCC)	1
UK Independent Albums (OCC)	9
