= The Great White Sea Eagle =

2023 studio album by James Yorkston

Studio album by James Yorkston, featuring Nina Persson and The Second Hand Orchestra
- Released: 13 January 2023
- Studios: Abbey Road Studios, London, England, United Kingdom; Studio Rymden, Stockholm, Sweden
- Genre: Baroque pop
- Length: 43:41
- Label: Domino Recording Company
- Producers: Daniel Bengtson; Karl-Jonas Winqvist; James Yorkston

James Yorkston chronology
The Wide, Wide River (2021)	The Great White Sea Eagle (2023)

The Great White Sea Eagle is a 2023 album by Scottish singer-songwriter James Yorkston, collaborating with Swedish musicians Nina Persson and The Second Hand Orchestra. The album has received positive reviews from critics.

== Reception ==
Professional ratings
Aggregate scores
Source	Rating
AnyDecentMusic?	7.7/10
Metacritic	86/100
Review scores
Source	Rating
AllMusic	4.5/5 stars
Clash Music	8/10
The Irish Times	3/5 stars
Mojo	4/5 stars
musicOMH	4/5 stars
The Skinny	4/5 stars
Uncut	8/10
Under the Radar	8/10

Editors of AnyDecentMusic? scored this album a 7.7 out of 10, based on eight reviews. The Great White Sea Eagle received positive reviews from critics noted at review aggregator Metacritic. It has a weighted average score of 86 out of 100, based on seven reviews.

Editors at AllMusic chose this and an Album Pick and rated it 4.5 out of 5 stars, with critic Tim Sendra writing that it is a "loose and lively set of arrangements that felt improvised, while at the same time as intricate as a fine piece of jewelry". In Clash Music, Robin Murray gave The Great White Sea Eagle an 8 out of 10, stating that it "is peppered with jewels". In The Irish Times, Tony Clayton-Lea rated this release 3 out of 5 stars, characterizing it as "odd, beguiling and very good". Glyn Brown of Mojo rated this release 4 out of 5 stars for "emotional heft that'll leave you winded, hidden in deceptively simple arrangements". Writing for musicOMH, Steven Johnson gave this release 4 out of 5 stars, characterizing it as "a special collaboration of tender, gentle moments that results in an enchanting and meditative listen" and summing up that "it's noticeable how familiar the songs already seem to feel, a special quality that confirms the album to be significantly greater than the sum of its individual parts". The Skinny's Alan O'Hare calls Yorkton "a noble artist" for the emotional depth of these lyrics and gives this album 4 out of 5 stars. Nick Halsted of Uncut rated this release an 8 out of 10, praising the vocalists: "Nina Persson adds clean, open vocal optimism to James Yorkston's reedy grain on harmonies, easygoing duets and some leads, on songs crisp as winter sunlight". In Under the Radar, The Great White Sea Eagle was rated 8 out of 10 stars, with critic Ian Rushbury calling it "a beautiful, hand made collection of natural and unforced songs to be treasured".

Editors at AllMusic included this on their list of the best albums of 2023, as well as favorite folk and Americana albums of 2023.

== Track listing ==
All songs written by James Yorkston.

1. "Sam and Jeanie McGreagor" – 1:55
2. "An Upturned Crab" – 2:58
3. "Keeping Up with the Grandchildren, Yeah" – 4:23
4. "The Heavy Lyric Police" – 4:32
5. "A Sweetness in You" – 3:14
6. "A Forestful of Rogues" – 4:13
7. "Peter Paulo Van Der Heyden" – 3:19
8. "Mary" – 3:26
9. "Hold Out for Love" – 3:09
10. "The Harmony" – 4:03
11. "The Great White Sea Eagle" – 3:24
12. "A Hollow Skeleton Lifts a Heavy Wing" – 5:05

== Personnel ==
Sam and Jeannie McGreagor

- Daniel Bengtson – bass guitar
- Ulrika Gyllenborg – violin
- Lina Langendorf – saxophone
- Peter Morén – guitar
- Nina Persson – vocals
- Karl Jonas Winqvist – drums
- James Yorkston – piano, vocals

An Upturned Crab

- Daniel Bengtson – bass guitar
- Ulrika Gyllenborg – violin
- Emma Nordenstam – cello
- Nina Persson – vocals
- James Yorkston – piano, vocals

Keeping Up with the Grandchildren, Yeah

- Daniel Bengtson – bass guitar
- Ulrika Gyllenborg – violin
- Lina Langendorf – flute
- Peter Morén – guitar
- Nina Persson – vocals
- Lars Skogland – drums
- James Yorkston – piano, vocals

The Heavy Lyric Police

- Daniel Bengtson – bass guitar
- Ulrika Gyllenberg – violin
- Lina Langendorf – saxophone
- Peter Morén – guitar
- Emma Nordenstam – cello
- Lars Skogland – drums
- Karl Jonas Winqvist – bass harmonica
- James Yorkston – piano, vocals

A Sweetness in You

- Lars Skogland – drums
- James Yorkston – piano, vocals

A Forestful of Rogues

- Daniel Bengtson – organ
- Ulrika Gyllenberg – violin
- Emma Nordenstam – backing vocals
- James Yorkston – piano, vocals

Pieter Paulo Van Der Heyden

- Daniel Bengtson – bass guitar
- Ulrika Gyllenberg – violing
- Per Lager – drums
- Lina Langendorf – bass clarinet
- Peter Morén – guitar, backing vocals
- Emma Nordenstam – cello, backing vocals
- Nina Persson – vocals
- Karl Jonas Winqvist – percussion, vocals
- James Yorkston – piano, vocals

Mary

- Daniel Bengtson – bass guitar
- Ylva Ceder – English horn
- Lina Langendorf – saxophone
- Peter Morén – guitar
- Nina Persson – vocals
- James Yorkston – piano, drums, bells

Hold Out for Love

- Daniel Bengtson – bass guitar
- Ulrika Gyllenberg – violin
- Per Johansson – saxophone
- Goran Kajfes – trumpet
- Lina Langendorf – saxophone, flute
- Peter Morén – guitar
- Nina Persson – vocals
- Karl Jonas Winqvist – drums
- James Yorkston – piano, vocals

The Harmony

- Ulrika Gyllenberg – violin
- Emma Nordenstam – cello, piano
- Nina Persson – vocals
- Karl Jonas Winqvist – Omnichord
- James Yorkston – guitar, drums, vocals

The Great White Sea Eagle

- Daniel Bengtson – backing vocals
- Peter Morén – guitar, backing vocals
- Emma Nordenstam – cello
- Nina Persson – backing vocals
- James Yorkston – Rhodes electric piano, Bookcorder tape, vocals

A Hollow Skeleton Lifts a Heavy Wing

- Daniel Bengtson – bass guitar
- Ylva Ceder – English horn
- Ulrika Gyllenberg – violin
- Lina Langendorf – flute
- Peter Morén – backing vocals
- Emma Nordenstam – cello, backing vocals
- Nina Persson – vocals
- Lars Skoglund – drums
- James Yorkston – keyboards, vocals

Technical personnel

- Daniel Bengtson – mixing, production
- John Broadley – artwork
- Matthew Cooper – layout
- Anna Drvnik – photography
- Sean Magee – mastering
- Karl-Jonas Winqvist – production
- James Yorkston – production, liner notes

== Charts ==
Chart performance for The Great White Sea Eagle
Chart (2023)	Peak position
Scottish Albums (Official Charts)	9
UK Album Downloads (Official Charts)	22
UK Folk Albums (Official Charts)	1
UK Independent Albums (Official Charts)	13

== See also ==
- 2023 in British music
- List of 2023 albums
