= Lisa O'Neill (singer-songwriter) =

Irish singer-songwriter

- Born: Lisa O'Neill; July 7, 1982 (age 44); Ireland
- Origin: County Cavan
- Genres: Folk; Traditional folk
- Occupation: Singer-songwriter
- Instruments: Vocals; guitar; banjo; autoharp
- Years active: 2000–present
- Labels: River Lea; Rough Trade Records; Plateau Records
- Website: lisaoneill.ie

Lisa O'Neill (born 1982) is an Irish singer-songwriter.

== Early life ==
O'Neill grew up in Ballyhaise, County Cavan.

== Career ==
Moving to Dublin at the age of 18, O'Neill studied music at Ballyfermot College. For seven years afterwards, she worked in the service industry in places such as Eddie Rocket's and Bewley's of Grafton Street, and continued to write songs. Her first album, Has An Album, was released in 2009. In 2011, David Gray invited her to open for him on his American and Canadian tour and she was also part of his touring band for a time. Her 2013 and 2018 albums were nominated for the Choice Music Prize. She played at the 2016 Vancouver Folk Music Festival.

O'Neill made an appearance in 2016 on the debut album Everything Sacred by the trio Yorkston/Thorne/Khan. In the album's liner notes, singer James Yorkston reveals that the possibility of calling the group Yorkston/Thorne/Khan/O'Neill was discussed, but that she saw herself as a guest.

In the 2017 film Song of Granite, O'Neill was featured singing "The Galway Shawl". Donal Dineen and Miles O'Reilly then showcased her in their seminal YouTube survey of contemporary Irish folk artists, This Ain't No Disco. She sang her song "Factory Girl" with Radie Peat (a member of the band Lankum), performing an a cappella performance that combined traditional music with intense, minimal production values.

O'Neill won Best Original Folk Track with "Rock the Machine" (from her album Heard a Long Gone Song) at the 2019 RTÉ Radio 1 Folk Awards, and was nominated for Folk Singer of the Year, Best Traditional Track, Best Original Track and Best Album at the BBC Radio 2 Folk Awards in the same year.

After covering Dylan's "All the Tired Horses in 2021," O'Neill reached a huge mainstream audience when her dark contralto channelled Tommy Shelby's return to his Roma roots in the final episode of Peaky Blinders.

In December 2023, O'Neill performed a rendition of "Fairytale of New York" alongside the Pogues and Glen Hansard at Shane MacGowan's funeral service held at St Mary's of the Rosary Catholic Church, Nenagh, County Tipperary, Ireland. They sang the roles of the 1987 original hit recording by the late Kirsty MacColl and MacGowan.

O'Neill joined The Pogues and an all-star band in 2025 for a seven-date UK tour celebrating the 40th anniversary of the Rum Sodomy & the Lash album, followed by a seven-date North American tour.

In October of 2025 she released the single and video "The Wind Doesn't Blow This Far Right", followed in November by a six-song EP of the same name, which included a guest appearance by Pete Doherty on the song "Homeless In The Thousands (Dublin In The Digital Age)".

On August 4, 2026, O'Neill performed "Old Note" at Glen Hansard's funeral, which was held at St. Patrick's Cathedral in Dublin, Ireland. Before she sang, she told the story of how Hansard had given her the keys to an apartment with soaring ceilings, where she lived for the next seven years. Hansard had told her "Let your imagination grow in this big space, and write songs." "Old Note" was the first song O'Neill wrote there, and it later appeared on her album All of This Is Chance, much of which was written at that apartment.

== Discography ==
=== Studio albums ===
List of albums, with year of release and peak chart positions
Title	Year	Peak chart positions
Title	Year	IRE
Has an Album	2009	—
Same Cloth or Not	2013	14
Pothole in the Sky	2016	40
Heard a Long Gone Song	2018	81
All of This Is Chance	2023	6
The Wind Doesn't Blow This Far Right	2025	—

=== EP ===
- The Wren, the Wren (2019)
