= Mark Russell (composer) =

British composer (born 1960)

- Born: Mark Russell; 23 May 1960 (age 66); London, England, UK
- Education: University of York
- Occupation: Composer
- Years active: 1990–present
- Family: Simon Russell (brother) Georgia Russell (daughter)

Mark Russell (born 23 May 1960) is a British composer whose works include music for the television series Cold Feet, Murder City, The Bill, The Worst Witch, Inspector George Gently and Kingdom. He presented Mixing It with Robert Sandall on BBC Radio 3 from 1990 to 2007, when the programme ended. His score for Cold Feet was nominated for a BAFTA Award for Best Original Television Music in 1999, though lost to Ben Bartlett's score to Walking with Dinosaurs. In 2012 his score for the BBC series Leonardo was nominated for an Ivor Novello Award in the Best Television Soundtrack category. His score for the Best of Men, the BBC2 biopic of Ludwig Guttmann the founder of the Paralympics starring Eddie Marsan, was nominated for an RTS award in 2012.

Born in London, Russell was educated at St Paul's Cathedral School and Churcher's College. He graduated from the University of York in 1982 with a degree in music; he was a presenter on University Radio York but was "thrown out ... for laughing while reading the news".
