= Sohel Rana =

Sohel Rana may refer to:

- Sohel Rana (actor), Bangladeshi film actor
- Sohel Rana (businessman), Bangladeshi owner of Rana Plaza building which collapsed April 2013
- Sohel Rana (footballer, born 1995), Bangladeshi footballer who plays for Bashundhara Kings
