= U.N.P.O.C. (musician) =

Scottish musician

- Birth name: Tom Bauchop
- Origin: Crook of Devon, Scotland
- Genres: Lo-fi; folk
- Occupation: Musician
- Labels: Domino Records

Tom Bauchop, best known by his stage name U.N.P.O.C., is a Scottish musician and member of the Fence Collective. He has released two albums on Domino Records, Fifth Column and the limited edition Live at King Tut's. Fifth Column featured only two musicians: Bauchop, and drummer Stu Bastiman.

Fifth Column received a number of positive reviews in print media, including lead review and 9/10 in the winter 2003 edition of Swedish music magazine Sonic. The record scored 4/5 in the print editions of UK music magazines Uncut and X-Ray, with X-Ray calling the album "odd but oddly affecting". UK newspaper The Daily Telegraph did not use a numerical score but noted that while the album was "too unpolished to tussle with the Pop Idols on mainstream radio", it was "in some better parallel universe... ...the pop album of 2003".

One early U.N.P.O.C. live performance was captured by MTV Nordic, who visited the Fence Collective as their subjects for season 1, episode 1 of their TV documentary series "This Is Our Music". Broadcast on MTV2 in February 2004, the programme featured Bauchop performing and being interviewed.

Bauchop performed live shows from 2003 through to 2006, his live band consisting of then Fence Collective musicians King Creosote, James Yorkston and The Pictish Trail. Notable performances included Glastonbury Festival, London's Alexandra Palace (supporting that year's Mercury Music Prize winners Franz Ferdinand), and a headlining performance at Popaganda Festival in Stockholm, Sweden.

The single Here on My Own was used in the 2007 film, Hallam Foe and in its theatrical trailer. The film went on to win the award for "Best Music" at that year's Berlin Film Festival. The song was also used to soundtrack the theatrical trailer for the 2007 Golden Horse Film Festival in Taipei, Taiwan.

In 2022, the same song was used by Greek-based airline Sky Express in its summer television advertising and marketing campaign, ‘In With the New'. Produced in collaboration with the advertising agency Soho Square Athens, FILMIKI and New York based director Matthew Dillon Cohen, the campaign included TV adverts in Greece and social media marketing across a number of EU territories.

== Discography ==
=== Albums ===
- Fifth Column (2003)
- Live at King Tut's (2004)

=== Singles ===
- "Amsterdam" / "Here on My Own" (2003)
