= Shady Bard =

English indie rock band

- Origin: Birmingham, England
- Genres: Indie rock, lo-fi, folk-influenced
- Years active: 2004–present
- Members: Lawrence Becko; Tom Rogers

Shady Bard are an indie rock band formed in Birmingham, England in 2004, by multi-instrumentalists Lawrence Becko and Tom Rogers.

Their music is characterised by complex arrangements and unusual instrumentation of lo-fi folk-influenced indie music. Lyrically their work revolves around issues of ecology and the environment. Their music has featured as part of a global warming campaign on MTV and within American TV programmes such as Grey's Anatomy and The Vampire Diaries.

== Discography ==
=== Albums ===
Year	Title
2007	From The Ground Up: Released: 28 May 2007
2010	Trials: Released: 10 November 2010
