= From the Ground Up (Shady Bard album) =

Studio album by Shady Bard
- Released: 28 May 2007
- Genre: indie rock
- Label: Static Caravan Recordings

Shady Bard chronology
From the Ground Up (2007)	Trials (2010)

Professional ratings
Review scores
Source	Rating
Drowned in Sound	9/10
God Is in the TV	4/5
The Line of Best Fit	75%
musicOMH	4/5 stars

From the Ground Up is an album by Birmingham-based experimental folk band Shady Bard. It was the first full-length album recorded by the band and released by Static Caravan Recordings.

== Track listing ==
1. "Fires" – 4:08
2. "Bobby" – 3:48
3. "These Quiet Times" – 3:38
4. "Frozen Lake" – 1:12
5. "Treeology" – 3:17
6. "Torch Song" – 4:07
7. "Memory Tree" – 4:30
8. "Penguins" – 4:51
9. "From the Ground Up" – 3:30
10. "Winter Coats" – 3:03
11. "Summer Came When We Were Falling Out" – 3:22
12. "Dust" – 2:33 (Japanese edition only)
13. "What's Behind the Door? – 3:54 (Japanese edition only)
