= The Cellardyke Recording and Wassailing Society =

Studio album by James Yorkston
- Released: 17 August 2014
- Genre: Folk
- Label: Domino
- Producer: Alexis Taylor

James Yorkston chronology
I Was a Cat from a Book (2012)	The Cellardyke Recording and Wassailing Society (2014)	The Route to the Harmonium (2019)

Professional ratings
Review scores
Source	Rating
NME	link
AllMusic	link
Drowned in Sound	link
The Guardian	link

The Cellardyke Recording and Wassailing Society is a studio album by James Yorkston.

The album was released on 17 August 2014 and is the seventh studio album by Yorkston. It was produced by Alexis Taylor of Hot Chip in London's Livingston studio. KT Tunstall, The Pictish Trail and Taylor feature on the album.

== Track listing ==
1. "Fellow Man"
2. "The Blues You Sang"
3. "Sweet Sweet"
4. "Guy Fawkes' Signature"
5. "Thinking About Kat"
6. "Feathers Are Falling"
7. "Broken Wave (A Blues for Doogie)"
8. "Red Fox"
9. "King of the Moles"
10. "Great Ghosts"
11. "Sleep On"
12. "Embers"
13. "Honey on Thigh"
14. "As Grey and As White"
15. "The Very Very Best"
16. "You & Your Sister" (Chris Bell)

All tracks written by Yorkston except where shown.

== Musicians ==
- James Yorkston - Vocals (1–16), Guitar (1–15), Percussion (8), Shaker (10), Tape Recorder (10), Concertina (12,14), Vibraphone (14), Piano (16)
- Fimber Bravo - Steel Pan (7)
- Pictish Trail - Vocals (1,2,4–15)
- Emma Smith - Vibraphone (1,6,7,9–12), Vocals (1,5,8,11,13), Violin (2,6–8,12), Piano (5), Clarinet (12)
- Rob Smoughton - Cymbals (3), Steel Pan (4), Drums (6,8,10)
- Alexis Taylor - Vocals (1,6,8–10,12,15), Wurlitzer (1,3), Electric Guitar (1,2,4–6,8,10–12), Piano (2,4,10,15), Synthesizer (2,4,6,7,9,12,14,15), Drum Machine (4), Percussion (4,10), Harmonium (8), Fender Rhodes (12,13), Hammond Organ (12), Steel Pan (14), Kalimba (15)
- Jon Thorne - Double Bass (1–15), Vocals (1)
- KT Tunstall - Vocals (1–7,9–14), Piano (12)
- Esme Wright - Vocals (10)
