= Suhail Yusuf Khan =

Indian sarangi player (born 1988)

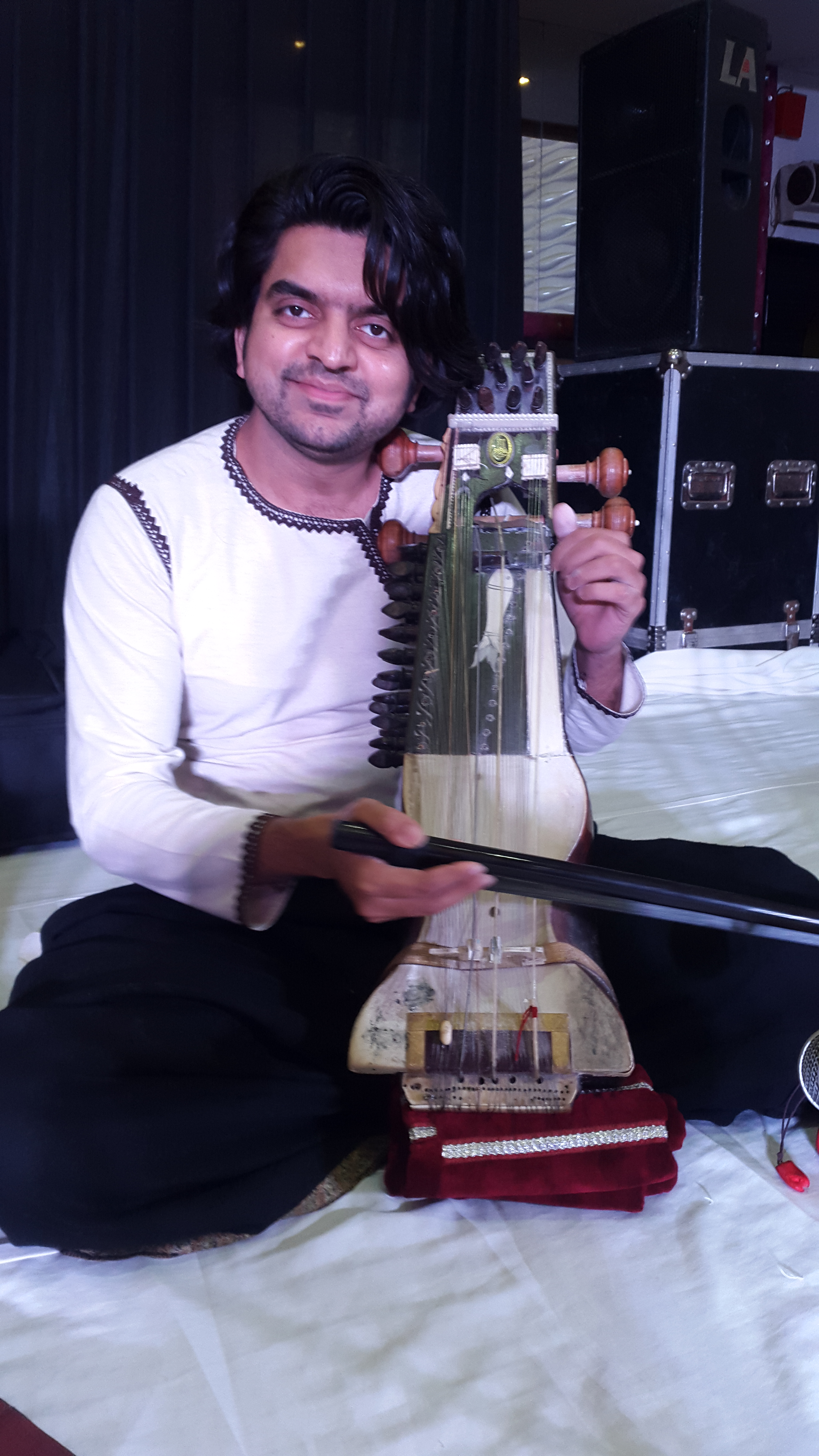
- Suhail during a show in 2015

Background information
- Born: 7 February 1988 (age 38); Delhi, National Capital Region, India
- Origin: Sri Venkateswara College
- Genres: Sarangi, Sufi Rock
- Instruments: Sarangi
- Years active: 2003–present
- Website: suhailyusufkhan.com

Suhail Yusuf Khan (Hindi: सुहेल युसूफ खान; born 1988) is an Indian sarangi player and vocalist. He is the grandson of Sarangi maestro Ustad Sabri Khan (1927-2015).

In 2016, Khan released Everything Sacred, a collaborative folk album with James Yorkston and Jon Thorne under the name Yorkston/Thorne/Khan. The trio went on to release two further albums, Neuk Wight Delhi All-Stars (2017) and Navarasa: Nine Emotions (2020).

Khan is also a member of Welsh-Indian folk fusion group Khamira, who released their debut self-titled album in May 2017. The group includes Indian musicians and members of Welsh folk-jazz group Burum; both Khamira (Hindi) and Burum (Welsh) mean "yeast" in English.
