= Suhail A. Khan =

American political activist

Suhail A. Khan is an American lawyer, political activist and corporate executive. He is Senior Director of External Affairs at Microsoft and a Senior Fellow at the Institute for Global Engagement.

He previously served in the administration of George W. Bush, holding positions at the White House and the United States Department of Transportation. He also worked as a congressional aide to Republican Representative Tom Campbell.

== Background and education ==
Khan was born in Boulder, Colorado, to parents who had immigrated to the United States from southern India. He grew up in California as the eldest of five children. He graduated from St. Lawrence Academy in Santa Clara, California, in 1987, earned a bachelor's degree in political science from the University of California, Berkeley in 1991, and received a Juris Doctor from the University of Iowa in 1995. While at Berkeley, Khan became active in Republican politics. He began as a volunteer coordinator for the California Republican Party, organizing voter-contact and get-out-the-vote activities. He later became involved with the Berkeley College Republicans and other conservative organizations.

== Career ==
Khan served as Policy Director and Press Secretary for U.S. Congressman Tom Campbell (R-CA), working closely on legislation relating to health antitrust reform, religious freedom, the preservation of the Second Amendment, tort reform, gun control, the reform of race-based affirmative action, and the 1998 impeachment proceedings in the House of Representatives. After the 2000 elections, he aided the White House Office of Public Liaison in the President’s outreach to the conservative, think-tank, military and veteran and Asian-American communities.

He served as Assistant to the Secretary for Policy under U.S. Secretary Mary Peters at the U.S. Department of Transportation, where he was awarded the Secretary’s Team Award in 2005 and the Gold Medal for Outstanding Achievement in 2007.

In 2010 and again in 2013, Khan led delegations of American and international faith leaders to Auschwitz, the Nazi death camp that operated in German-occupied Poland and the Dachau concentration camp in Germany, to educate faith and community leaders regarding the tragedy of the Holocaust during World War Two. Joined by Rabbi Jack Bemporad of the Center for Interreligious Understanding of New Jersey and Professor Marshall Breger of the Catholic University of America Columbus School of Law, the delegations visited the death camps, met with survivors, issued statements strongly condemning anti-Semitism, Holocaust denial, and pledged to fight religious bigotry.

== Political activities ==
In a volunteer capacity, Khan was an active participant in the RNC’s 72-hour program and deployed to key races in states including Colorado, Washington, Iowa, Louisiana, Virginia, New Jersey, Pennsylvania and Massachusetts.

Khan serves on the Board of Directors for the American Conservative Union, the Indian American Conservative Council, and on the interfaith Buxton Initiative Advisory Council. He speaks regularly at conferences and venues such as the Conservative Political Action Conference (CPAC), the Council for National Policy (CNP), the Harbour League, and the National Press Club and has contributed to publications such as the Washington Post/Newsweek Forum On Faith, the Washington Post, Foreign Policy, and Human Events.

Khan has criticized anti-Muslim rhetoric within Republican and conservative circles. In 2011, during the controversy over Representative Peter T. King's congressional hearings on Muslim radicalization, he called on politicians to avoid using national security issues to encourage hostility toward Muslim Americans. In 2016, Khan became an inaugural member of the Muslim-Jewish Advisory Council, established by the American Jewish Committee and the Islamic Society of North America.

In 2017, he participated in an American Jewish Committee delegation to Israel, visiting Jerusalem and the country's northern border and taking part in discussions on interfaith relations and humanitarian issues. Khan has also written about Holocaust remembrance, antisemitism and religious persecution. He participated in interfaith visits to Auschwitz and other former Nazi concentration camps in 2010, 2013 and 2020. In 2021, he received the American Jewish Committee's Project Interchange Alumnus of the Year Award. Khan was interviewed, by Pastor Bob Roberts of Dallas, Texas, where he discussed Muslim-Christian interaction and his experience serving in the White House, and has appeared on the BBC, CNN, Al-Jazeera, C-SPAN, and MSNBC's The Rachel Maddow Show as a conservative commenter.

=== Trump administration ===
In 2015, Khan criticized Republican presidential candidate Donald Trump for his anti-Muslim remarks. Khan criticized Islamophobic remarks by Republican candidates Ben Carson and Donald Trump, arguing that they are damaging the efforts of the party to recruit Muslims. After Trump accepted the Republican presidential nomination, Khan stated "I’m not a Trump supporter; I initially supported Rand Paul," and "As a lawyer and conservative, I see that Trump’s comments have had a negative impact on the party." In a 2017 interview, Khan said of the Trump presidency "I'm excited for the nomination and confirmations of Justice Neil Gorsuch and FCC Chairman Ajit Pai". He also anticipated that the Trump administration would work on tax reform for small-business owners and the middle class. Khan was listed as an advisory board member of the "Indian Voices for Trump" coalition for Trump's 2020 re-election campaign. In December 2024, Khan published an opinion article discussing how Trump's approach to international negotiations could affect diplomatic efforts concerning the war in Ukraine and conflicts in the Middle East.

== Allegations ==
Khan became involved in a controversy within the American conservative movement in the late 2000s and early 2010s. Conservative activist Frank Gaffney and others questioned his associations with organizations they linked to the Muslim Brotherhood and his position in the American Conservative Union.

Khan denied the allegations, describing them as false and based on guilt by association. The American Conservative Union rejected the allegations against Khan and fellow board member Grover Norquist, expressing confidence in their loyalty to the United States. Gaffney and other conservative activists continued to criticize Khan.
