= Static Caravan Recordings =

English independent record label

- Founded: 1998
- Status: Active
- Country of origin: United Kingdom
- Official website: Static Caravan Recordings website

Static Caravan Recordings is an independent record label based in the North West of England, whose artist releases include singles and albums by Darren Hayman, the Hornblower Brothers, Hannah Peel, Erland & the Carnival, Shady Bard, the Yellow Moon Band, Tunng, Peter Astor, Magnetophone, Fieldhead, Serafina Steer, Matters, Polyhymns, The Memory Band, FortDax, Matthew Edwards, and Boat To Row. The label focuses mainly on alt-folk and indie music.

The label has a record shop, Static Records, located in Wigan town centre.

== See also ==
- List of record labels
