= David Wrench (music producer) =

Welsh musician, songwriter and producer

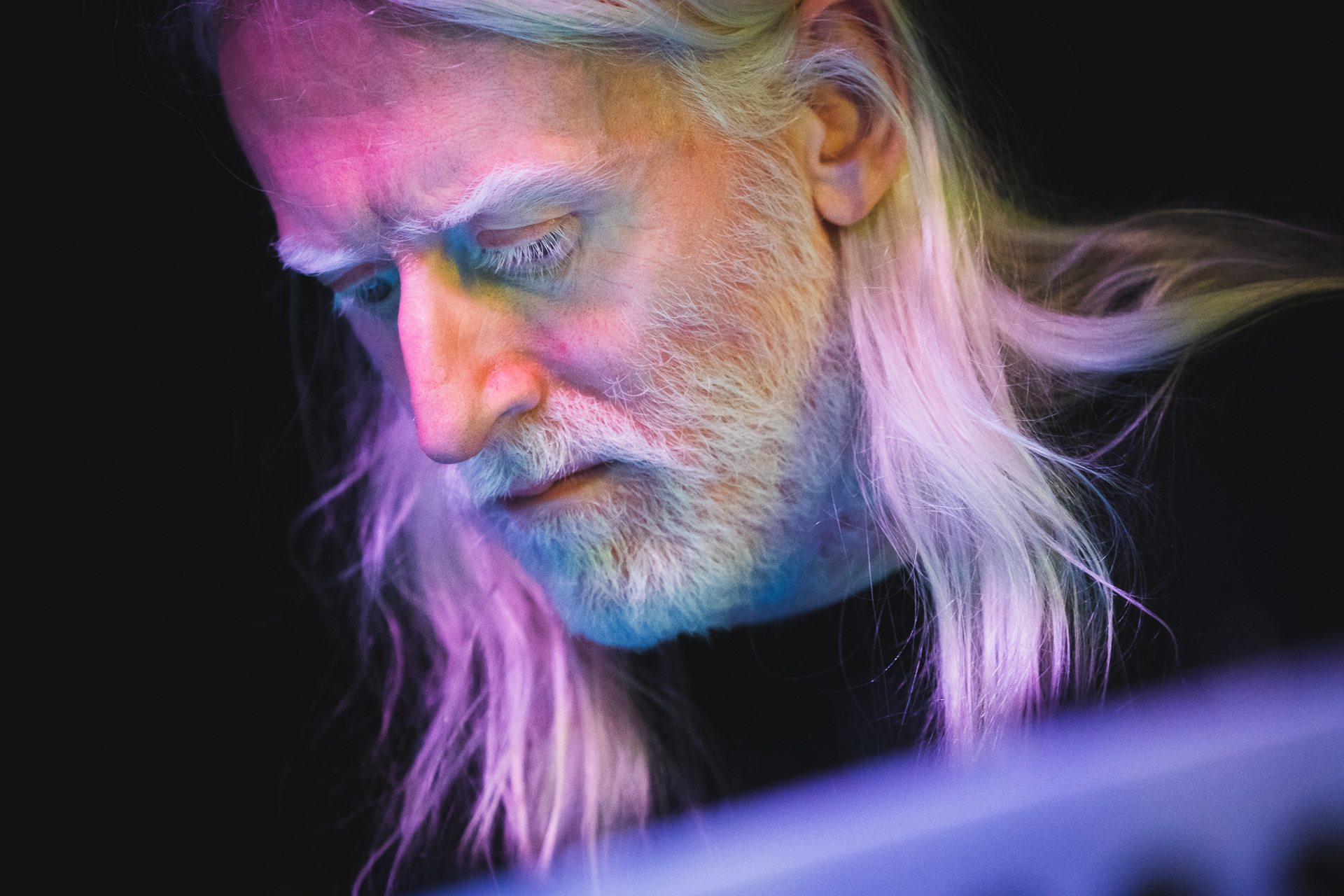
- Wrench in 2018

Background information
- Origin: Bryngwran, Isle of Anglesey, Wales
- Genres: Pop; Indie; Electronic; Folk; Experimental
- Occupations: Record producer; mixer; engineer; musician
- Years active: 1989–present
- Website: davidwrench.co.uk

David Wrench is a Welsh musician, songwriter, producer and mixer based in London. His work has been nominated for Grammys, Brit Awards and shortlisted for numerous Mercury Prize nominations including the 2017 winning album Process by Sampha. and Arlo Parks 2021 'Collapsed in Sunbeams'. Wrench has been the recipient of the BBC Radio Cymru C2 Producer of the Year award five times in six years between 2007 and 2012 and has received Music Producer Guild Awards (MPGs) including Mix Engineer of the Year 2016 and 2019. Credits include, David Byrne, Frank Ocean, The Pretenders, Blur, Caribou, Goldfrapp, Erasure, The xx, Sampha, Jamie xx, Jungle, FKA Twigs, Glass Animals, Florence and the Machine, Arlo Parks, Alma, Hot Chip, Marika Hackman, Honne, Jack Garratt, Manic Street Preachers, Villagers, Courtney Barnett, Austra, Tourist, Richard Russell, Let's Eat Grandma, Young Fathers, Georgia, Bat For Lashes and Race Horses.

David Wrench mixes in Dolby Atmos.

== Career ==
=== Solo career ===
As a musician, Wrench first came to public attention in 1990 with his first group Nid Madagascar who released the first Welsh-language acid house record "Lledrith Lliw" as a 12" single in 1990. This was followed by his first solo album Blow Winds Blow, released via Ankst in 1997. After its release, Wrench began working as an engineer, producer and occasional instrumentalist for artists. His early engineering and production credits from this period include records by British Sea Power, The Good Sons, Jackie Leven and The Blueskins, Zabrinski, MC Mabon, Julian Cope (Brain Donor) and Welsh Music Prize winning album from Georgia Ruth. Mix credits from this time include James Yorkston, Caribou (Albums Andorra and Swim), Week of Pines and Y Niwl.

In 2010 Wrench released the album Spades & Hoes & Plows on Invada records. The album, which was produced by Julian Cope, comprises three re-workings of old revolutionary folk songs and one original instrumental piece based on the Rebecca riots. Writing in the Sunday Times, Stewart Lee described the album thus: "In the face of young people's new enthusiasm for trad-lite, the Welsh weirdo David Wrench threatens to reunpopularise folk music, foregrounding puritanical politics over unpalatable instrumentation at funereal tempos. Fans of Lisbee Stainton are unlikely to enjoy Wrench's punishing, 24-minute rendition of "The Blackleg Miner" despite the invigorating and apocalyptically primitive Mellotron interludes supplied by Julian Cope's Black Sheep band. These weary recitations of traditional protest songs require patience, but by Helyntion Beca, a wordless closing workout inspired by 19th-century black-face transvestites attacking Carmarthenshire toll gates, the LP achieves a tortuous transcendence."

=== Collaborations ===
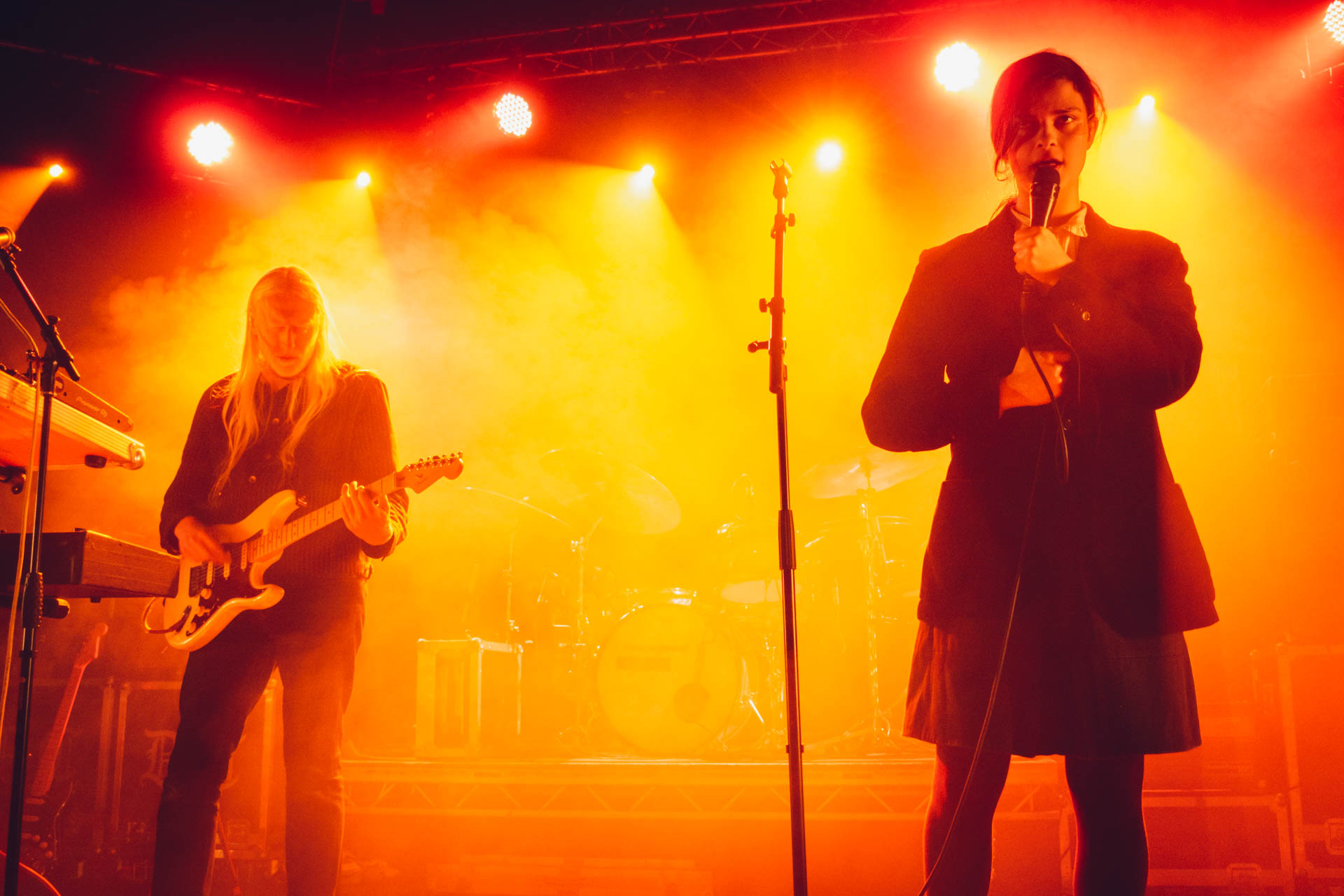
Audiobooks performing at Cambridge Junction in 2022

In 2018, he formed the band audiobooks alongside singer, artist and model Evangeline Ling. The band signed to Heavenly Recordings and released their debut album Now! (in a minute) in November 2018. In 2021 audiobooks released their second LP Astro Tough followed in 2023 by Gulliver EP.

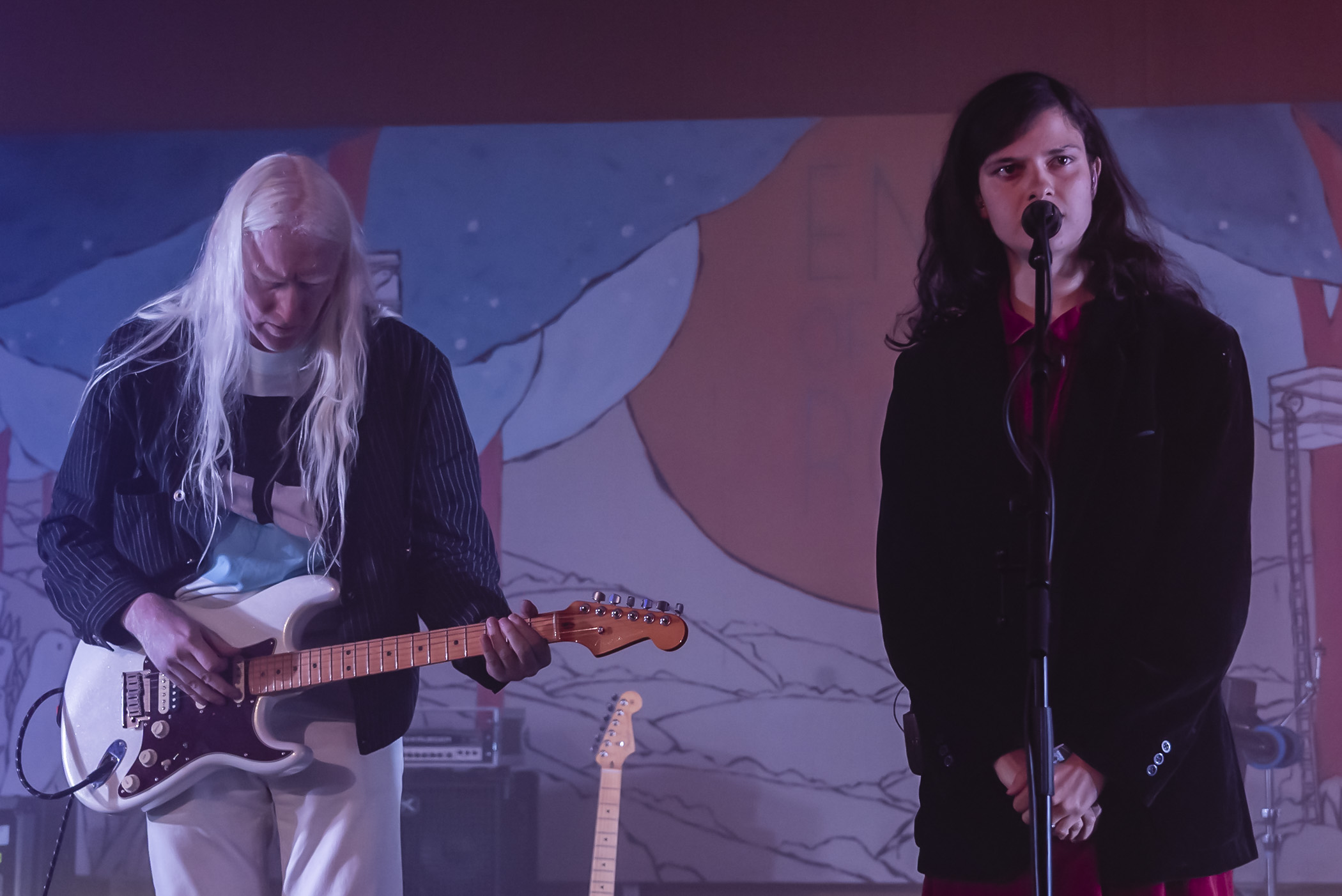

=== Production, mixing, engineering ===
When not working on his own music, David Wrench is a studio Record Producer and Engineer. Wrench's production and mix credits from 2004 to 2014 include a number of critically acclaimed albums for Bear in Heaven (I Love You, It's Cool), Alessi's Ark (Time Travel), Race Horses (Goodbye Falkenberg), The Lizzies (St. John), Holy Coves (Peruvian Mistake), Zun Zun Egui (Katang), Y Niwl, Gwyneth Glyn, Skinny Lister (Forge & Flagon) and Caribou (Swim). As an Engineer he worked on albums by Bat For Lashes, Everything Everything, Kathryn Williams, Guillemotts, Beth Orton, James Yorkston, Nancy Elizabeth and Fanfarlo.

In 2014 he mixed FKA Twigs' critically lauded LP1, and Jungle's self titled debut album, both subsequently nominated for the Mercury Prize.

In 2015 Wrench worked with Dan Snaith aka Caribou on the album Our Love which went on to be nominated in the Best Dance/Electronic album at the 2015 Grammy Awards. That same year, Wrench provided surround sound mixing of Wayne McGregor's ballet Tree of Codes for its debut at the Manchester Opera House for the Manchester International Festival. The ballet features music by Jamie xx, and visual design by Olafur Eliasson. The ballet was highly acclaimed, and continues to tour.

In 2016 Wrench mixed "Self Control" on Frank Ocean's second studio album Blonde.

In 2017, he mixed Sampha's Mercury Prize and Brit Award winning album Process, and the following year he mixed David Byrne's American Utopia, which was subsequently nominated for Best Alternative Album at the 61st Grammy Awards. Wrench's other mix and producing credits from 2017/2018 include Goldfrapp's Silver Eye, The xx's I See You, Gwenno's Le Kov (Cornish language album), tracks from Richard Russell's EP Everything Is Recorded,Honne Love Me/Love Me Not, Lo Moon, For Me It's You, Blossoms album Cool Like You and Let's Eat Grandma I'm All Ears.

Wrench mixed Erasure's The Neon, the band's eighteenth studio album released in August 2020 by Mute Records. The album debuted at number four on the UK Albums Chart with 8,394 copies sold in its first week, the duo's highest-charting album since I Say I Say I Say (1994). In 2020 David also worked with Arlo Parks on tracks "Black Dog", "Eugene" and "Hurt". The latter two have been BBC Radio 1's Tune of the Week and Annie's Mac's Hottest Record. Parks won the AIM Independent Music Awards 2020 ‘One To Watch', was included in The NME 100, longlisted for BBC Sound of 2020 and went on to win a Brit Award for Breakthrough Artist, the Mercury Music Prize and was nominated for a Grammy.

Other releases of 2020 include Ellie Goulding's track "New Heights" from new album Brightest Blue, Jamie xx single "idontknow", Caribou album Suddenly and recent Frank Ocean tracks.

Other mixing and producing projects during this period include "Gosh" from Jamie xx's In Colour (2015); tracks from Glass Animals' How to Be a Human Being (2016), their debut Zaba (2014) and also their third full-length release Dreamland (2020); Marika Hackman's Any Human Friend (2019); Alma's Bad News Baby (2019), Manic Street Preachers The Ultra Livid Lament (2021) Villagers Fever Dreams (2021), Courtney Barnett Things Take Time, Take Time (2022).

More recent projects include production and mix on Let's Eat Grandma Two Ribbons (2022), mix on Lil Silva Yesterday Is Heavy (2022), mix on Hercules and Love affair In Amber (2022), mix on Oliver Sim Hideous Bastard (2022) mix on Shygirl's Nymph (2023), production and mix on Bombino Sahel (2023), production and mix on The Pretenders Relentless (2023), mix on Blur The Ballad of Darren (2023), mix on Sampha Lahai (2023), and mix on Arlo Parks My Soft Machine (2023).

In 2024 David mixed Declan McKenna's What Happend To The Beach?(2024), did co-production and mix on the porijTeething album (2024), mixed Rex Orange County The Alexander Technique (2024), mixed Blossoms Gary (2024), mixed album tracks from Jamie xx In Waves (2024), mixed Ezra Collective Dance, No One's Watching (2024), mixed Caribou Honey (2024), mixed Primal Scream Come Ahead (2024) and recently mixed the album tracks for the Bon Iver album SABLE, fABLE (2025).

=== Collaborations ===
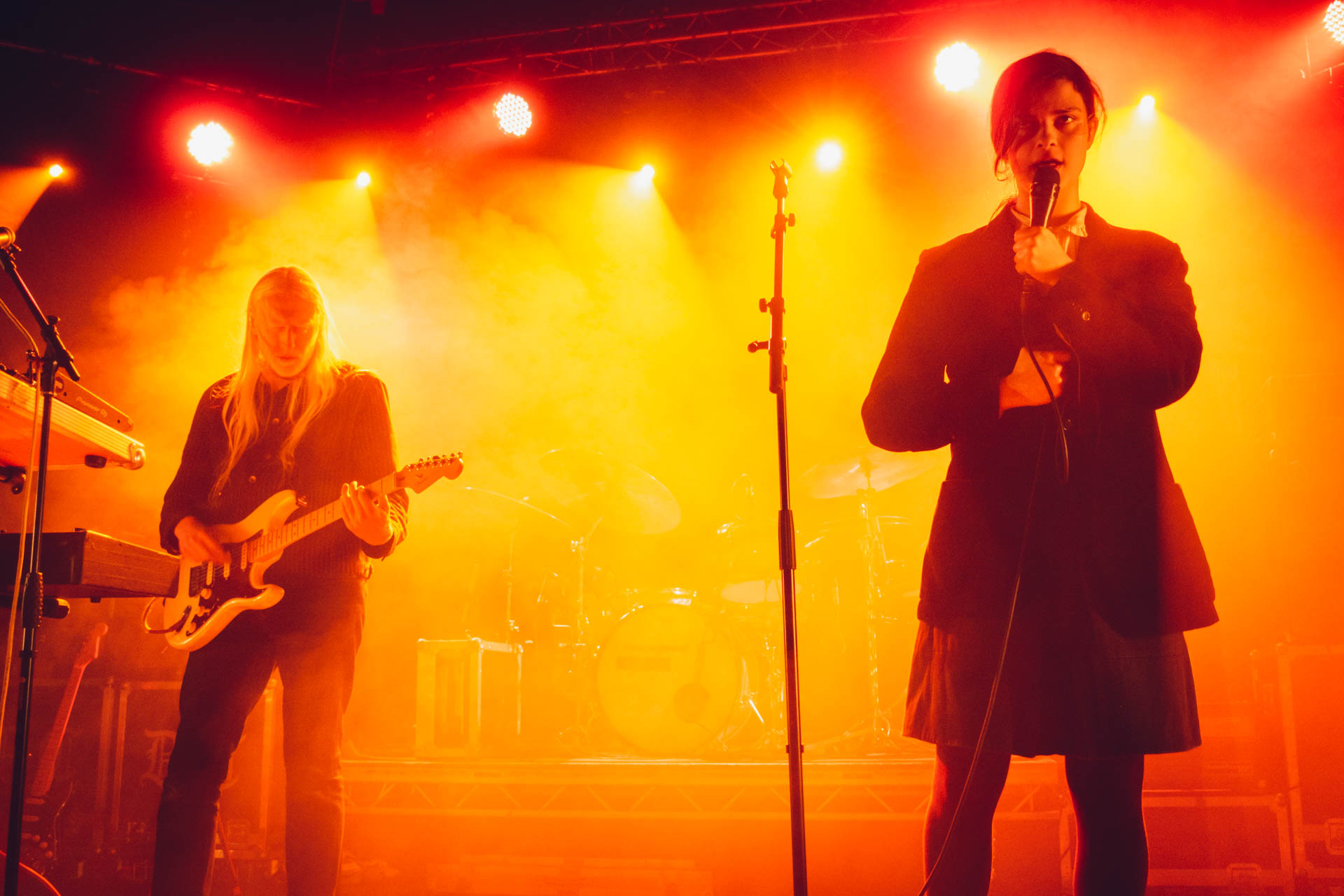
Audiobooks performing at Cambridge Junction in 2022

In 2018, Wrench co-founded the band audiobooks alongside singer, artist and model Evangeline Ling. The band signed to Heavenly Recordings and released their debut album Now! (in a minute) in November 2018. In 2021 audiobooks released their second LP Astro Tough followed in 2023 by Gulliver EP.

== Discography ==
=== Albums ===
- 1997: Blow Winds Blow (vinyl LP/audio CD)
- 1999: You Have Just been Poisened by The Serpents (audio CD with The Serpents)
- 2001 "Happiness", (Cherry Red Records), The Good Sons.
- 2005: The Atomic World of Tomorrow (audio CD)
- 2010: Spades & Hoes & Plows (audio CD)

=== Singles and EPs ===
- 1990: "Lledrith Lliw" (12" vinyl EP with Nid Madagascar)
- 1997: "Black Roses" (7" vinyl)
- 1997: "The Ballad of the Christmas Tree and the Silver Birch" (7" vinyl)
- 1998: "No Mask, No Cloak, Dim Gobaith" (7" vinyl with The Serpents)
- 1998: "Sings the Songs of the Shangri Las" (7" vinyl EP)
- 2004: "Superhorny" / "Fuck You And Your War on Terror" (12" vinyl & CD EP)
- 2004: "World War IV" (CD EP)

=== With audiobooks ===
- 2018: Now! (in a minute)
- 2021: Astro Tough
- 2023: Gulliver (EP)

== Production and mixing credits ==
Year	Artist	Release	Credit
2000	Jackie Leven	Defending Ancient Springs	Co-Production & Mix
2001	Jackie Leven	Creatures Of Light And Darkness	Engineer & Mix
2001	Julian Cope / Brian Donor	Tracks from Love Peace & Fuck	Recording & Mix
2002	Zabrinski	Koala Ko-ordination	Additional Production
2003	Jackie Leven	Shining Brother, Shining Sister	Engineer
2004	Sir Vincent Lone (aka Jackie Leven)	Songs For Lonely Americans	Engineer & Mix
2005	Jackie Leven & Ian Rankin	Jackie Leven Said	Co-Production & Mix
2005	Jackie Leven	Elegy For Johnny Cash	Co-Mix
2007	Jackie Leven	Oh What a Blow That Phantom Dealt Me!	Co-Production & Mix
2007	Caribou	Andorra	Mix
2007	Sir Vincent Lone (aka Jackie Leven)	When The Bridegroom Comes (Songs For Women)	Co-Production, Engineer & Mix
2008	Jackie Leven	Lovers At The Gun Club	Co-Production
2008	Sir Vincent Lone (aka Jackie Leven)	Troubadour Heart	Co-Production
2009	Lucas Renney	Strange Glory	Engineer
2009	Holy Coves	The Lizzies Ynys Môn	Co-Production & Mix
2009	Bat for Lashes	Two Suns	Engineer
2010	Race Horses	Goodbye Falkenburg	Production & Mix
2010	Y Niwl	Y Niwl	Production & Mix
2010	Jackie Leven	Gothic Road	Co-Production & Mix
2010	Everything Everything	Man Alive	Engineer
2010	Caribou	Swim	Mix
2010	Mizan	Dark Blue (EP)	Mix
2011	Zun Zun Egui	Katang	Production & Mix
2012	Skinny Lister	Forge and Flagon	Co-Production & Mix
2012	Race Horses	Furniture	Mix
2012	Holy Coves	Peruvian Mistake	Co-Production & Mix
2012	James Yorkston	I Was a Cat from a Book	Co-Production & Mix
2013	Georgia Ruth	Week of the Pines	Production & Mix
2014	Philip Selway	Weatherhouse	Mix
2014	Jungle	Jungle	Mix
2014	Caribou	Our Love	Mix
2014	FKA Twigs	LP1	Mix
2014	Owen Pallett	Tracks from In Conflict	Mix
2014	Glass Animals	Tracks from Zaba	Mix
2015	Erasure	Sometimes 2015	Mix
2015	Empress Of	Me	Mix
2015	LA Priest	Inji	Mix
2015	Bob Moses	Tracks from Days Gone By	Mix
2015	Hot Chip	Tracks from Why Make Sense?	Mix
2015	FKA Twigs	Tracks from M3LL155X	Mix
2015	Jamie xx	"Gosh"	Mix
2016	Bombino	Azel	Mix
2016	Bloc Party	Hymns	Mix
2016	Factory Floor	25 25	Mix
2016	Beth Orton	Kidsticks	Mix
2016	Blossoms	Blossoms	Mix & Additional Keys
2016	Jagwar Ma	So Ordinary	Mix
2016	Shura	Tracks from Nothing's Real	Mix
2016	Manic Street Preachers	"A Design for Life (David Wrench Remix)"	Remix
2016	Rihanna	"Kiss It Better (Four Tet Remix)"	Mix
2016	Glass Animals	Tracks from How to Be a Human Being	Mix
2016	Frank Ocean	Self Control	Mix
2017	Sampha	Process	Mix
2017	Goldfrapp	Silver Eye	Mix
2017	Tei Shi	Crawl Space	Mix
2017	The xx	I See You	Mix
2018	Gwenno	Le Kov	Mix
2018	Blossoms	Cool Like You	Additional Production & Mix
2018	Honne	Love Me/Love Me Not	Mix
2018	Let's Eat Grandma	I'm All Ears	Production & Mix
2018	David Byrne	American Utopia	Mix
2018	Jungle	For Ever	Mix
2018	The Charlatans	"Totally Eclipsing"	Production & Mix
2018	Lo Moon	For Me, It's You	Mix
2018	Young Fathers	"Cocoa Sugar" / "Boarder Girls"	Mix
2018	Richard Russell	"Everything Is Recorded" / "Be My Friend"	Mix
2019	James Yorkston	Route to Harmonium	Co-Production & Mix
2019	Tourist	Wild	Mix
2019	Marika Hackman	Any Human Friend	Co-Production & Mix
2019	Alma	"When I Die" / "Bad News Baby"	Mix
2019	Benee	Fire on Marzz (EP)	Mix
2019	Frank Ocean	"In My Room"	Mix
2020	Marika Hackman	Covers	Mix
2020	Jack Garratt	Love, Death & Dancing	Mix
2020	Austra	Hirudin	Mix
2020	Elderbrook	Why Do We Shake in the Cold?	Mix
2020	Honne	No Song Without You	Mix
2020	Erasure	The Neon	Mix
2020	Caribou	Suddenly	Mix
2020	Jamie xx	In Colour (2020 reissue)	Mix
2020	Georgia	"Mellow", "Honey Dripping Sky", and "Ultimate Sailor"	Mix
2020	Jealous of the Birds	"Young Neanderthal" / "Always Going"	Production & Mix
2020	Mustafa	"Air Forces" / "Stay Alive"	Mix
2020	Tourist	Siren	Mix
2020	Tourist	Last	Mix
2020	Khushi	Hotter Than Your Instincts	Mix
2020	Crooked Colours	"Love Language" / "Falling"	Mix
2020	Grand Pax	"Wavey" / "ATV"	Mix
2020	Ruel	"As Long as You Care"	Mix
2020	Mai Kino	"Dopamine" / "Lungs"	Mix
2020	Ellie Goulding	"New Heights"	Mix
2020	Glass Animals	Tracks from Dreamland	Mix
2020	HAAi	Put Your Head Above The Parakeets (EP)	Mix
2020	Jamie xx	"Idontknow"	Mix
2021	Arlo Parks	Collapsed in Sunbeams	Mix
2021	Manic Street Preachers	The Ultra Vivid Lament	Production & Mix
2021	Villagers	Fever Dreams	Mix
2022	Courtney Barnett	Things Take Time, Take Time	Mix
2022	Let's Eat Grandma	Two Ribbons	Production & Mix
2022	Just Mustard	Heart Under	Additional Production & Mix
2022	Lil Silva	Yesterday Is Heavy	Mix
2022	Hercules and Love Affair	In Amber	Mix
2022	Oliver Sim	Hideous Bastard	Mix
2022	Shygirl	Nymph	Mix
2022	Florence and the Machine	"Mermaids"	Mix
2023	Royel Otis	"Going Kokomo" / "I Wanna Dance With You"	Mix
2023	Overmono	"Good Lies" / "Calling Out"	Mix
2023	Poolside	Track from Blame It All on Love	Mix
2023	Arlo Parks	My Soft Machine	Mix
2023	Bombino	Sahel	Production & Mix
2023	Blur	The Ballad of Darren	Mix
2023	Baxter Dury	I Thought I Was Better Than You	Mix
2023	Carly Rae Jepsen	"So Right"	Mix
2023	Hot Chip	"Fire of Mercy"	Mix
2023	Elmiene	"Mama"	Mix
2023	TSHA, Ellie Goulding, and Gregory Porter	"Somebody"	Mix
2023	Ben Böhmer	"One Last Time"	Mix
2023	V	Layover	Mix
2023	Sampha	Lahai	Mix
2023	The Pretenders	Relentless	Production & Mix
2024	His Lordship	Tracks from His Lordship	Production & Mix
2024	Caribou	Honey	Mix
2024	The Zone of Interest	Film score	Mix
2024	Declan McKenna	What Happened to the Beach?	Mix
2024	Porij	Teething	Co-production & Mix
2024	RM	“Nuts” / “Heaven” / “Lost!”	Mix
2024	Ezra Collective	Dance, No One's Watching	Mix
2024	Blossoms	Gary	Mix
2024	Jamie xx	Album tracks In Waves	Mix
2024	Fcukers	Baggy$$	Mix
2024	Yannis & The Yaw	Lagos Paris London	Mix
2024	Washed Out	"Got Your Back" / "The Hardest Part"	Mix
2024	Picture Parlour	"Face in the Picture"	Mix
2024	Jeshi	"Total 90"	Mix
2024	Primal Scream	Come Ahead	Mix
2024	Rex Orange County	The Alexander Technique	Mix
2024	Kelly Lee Owens	Dreamstate	Mix
2024	Sampha	"Satellite Business 2.0"	Mix
2024	Tourist	"Protector"	Mix
2024	George Daniel	"Screen Cleaner"	Mix
2024	Sophie Ellis-Bextor	"Freedom Of The Night"	Additional Production & Mix
2024	Romy, Sampha	"I'm On Your Team"	Mix
2025	Ezra Collective	"Body Language"	Mix
2025	Jeshi	Airbag Woke Me Up	Mix
2025	Oscar Farrell	I've Already Called (EP)	Mix
2025	Lost Frequencies	"Dance In The Sunlight"	Mix
2025	Bon Iver	"Short Story" / "I'll Be There" / "If Only I Could Wait" / "There's A Rhythmn" / "Au Revoir"	Mix
2025	Black Bag	Film score	Mix
2025	Baxter Dury	Allbarone	Mix
2025	Leisure	Welcome to the Mood	Mix
2025	George Daniel & Oscar Farrell	"Volc3" / "Volc4"	Mix
2025	Factory Floor	"Between You"	Mix
2025	Léa Sen	Tracks from LEVELS	Mix
2025	Solomun & Jain	"Tout le monde est fou"	Mix
2025	Saint Etienne	"Glad"	Mix
2025	MOIO	"Figure It Out"	Mix
2025	Oscar Farrell	So Far South (EP)	Mix
2025	Oklou ft. FKA Twigs	"viscus"	Mix
2025	Hot Chip	"Devotion	Mix
2025	Kelly Lee Owens	"ASCEND"	Mix
2025	Daniel Avery	Tracks from Tremor	Mix
2025	HAAi	HUMANISE	Mix
2025	Sophie Ellis-Bextor	Perimenopop	Mix
2025	Jamie xx	"Dream Night"	Mix
2025	Sampha	"Cumulus / Memory"	Mix
2025	Romy	“Love Who You Love”	Mix
2025	Dry Cleaning	Secret Love	Mix
2025	Dave	Selfish	Mix
2025	David Byrne	“T Shirt”	Mix
2025	Robyn, Jamie xx	"Dopamine"	Mix
2025	Ezra Collective	"Joy To The World" / "Hark The Herald Angels Sing"	Mix
2025	Just Mustard	WE WERE JUST HERE	Mix
2025	C.Y.M.	C.Y.M.	Mix
2025	CORTIS	"Lullaby"	Mix
2025	Hex Girlfriend	Addictive Indulgence (EP)	Mix
2025	His Lordship	Bored Animal	Mix
2025	SurusingHE	i can’t remember the name of this, but that’s ok (EP)	Mix
2025	Together For Palestine	Lullaby	Mix
2026	Jon Hopkins & Imogen Heap	"Reckoning"	Mix
2026	Arlo Parks	Ambiguous Desire	Mix
2026	Ezra Collective	"Well Organised" / "Only Love"	Mix
2026	Ravyn Lenae	Blue Island	Mix
2026	CORTIS	"Blue Lips"	Mix
2026	Dahi	“Rest of Your Life” / "Find Me" / "Running" / "Square Up"	Mix
2026	Daniel Avery ft. Yunè Pinku	“Lazy Dreams”	Mix
2026	Factory Floor	"Buzz Saw"	Mix
2026	Baauer	U	Mix
2026	Sam Tompkins	“BEAUTY QUEEN” / "BODY TO BODY" / "CRAWLING OUT MY SKIN"	Mix
2026	Thibault Cauvin	Alter Ego	Production & Mix
2026	Roses Gabor	Peaces	Mix
2026	elsas	"IN MY WOMB" / “NIÑO”	Mix
2026	Oscar Farrell	Birds Fly In (EP)	Mix
2026	Rosa Walton	Tell Me It’s A Dream	Production & Mix
2026	C.Y.M.	My Whole World (EP)	Mix
2026	Various artists / War Child Records	"Parasite" / "When the War is Finally Done" / "Helicopters" / "Nothing I Could Hide" / "Naboo " / "Obvious" from HELP(2)	Production & Mix
