= Q Awards =

Annual British music awards

- Awarded for: Excellence in music
- Country: United Kingdom
- Presented by: Q
- First award: 1990
- Final award: 2019
- Website: Qthemusic.com

The Q Awards were the UK's annual music awards run by the music magazine Q. Since the awards began in 1990, they became one of Britain's biggest and best publicised music awards. Locations for the awards ceremony included Abbey Road Studios and near the end of its life, the Ballroom of The Park Lane Hotel, London.

One of the more notable events of the awards was the ceremony of 2004, at which Elton John accused Madonna of cheating fans by miming on stage, after she had been nominated for a Best Live Act award. The 2001 event, was somewhat notoriously notable for Phill Jupitus stretching out the time it took to announce the "Best Producer" award, with him, exclaiming "Best Producer?.... 'Would you like a cowbell in that?'", before being told off camera to get on with announcing the winner.

The Q Awards included many awards recognising a lifetime of achievement, rather than achievements over the year in question. In its last few years, the 'lifetime' awards have usually outnumbered the 'current' awards.

The awards came to an end when the magazine itself ceased publishing in 2020, blaming the COVID-19 pandemic. The 2020 awards ceremony would have been held at the Roundhouse and seen a performance by Paul Heaton and Jacqui Abbott. When it was announced that the magazine was closing, Heaton was revealed to have donated a substantial amount of money to the magazine's former staff members. As thanks, and for his contributions to music as a songwriter, Heaton was presented with a final Q Award.

== Results ==
=== 2019 ===
The winners of 2019 Q Awards are:

- Innovation In Sound: Dizzie Rascal
- Classic Album: Tricky – Maxinquaye
- Maverick Award: Edwyn Collins
- Play Award: Anna Calvi
- Outstanding Contribution To Music: Kano
- Classic Songwriter: Kevin Rowland
- Inspiration Award: Madness
- Icon Award: Christine And The Queens
- Hero Award: Kim Gordon
- Song Of The Decade: Lana Del Rey – "Video Games"
- Best Vocal Performance: Little Simz

Award	Winner	Nominee
Best Act in the World Today	The 1975	Nominees: Stormzy; The 1975; Billie Eilish; Florence And The Machine; Liam Gallagher; Arctic Monkeys; Lana Del Rey; Bruce Springsteen; Christine And The Queens; Biffy Clyro
Best Breakthrough Act	Pale Waves	Nominees: Gerry Cinnamon; Little Simz; Rosalía; Lewis Capaldi; Slowthai; Fontaines DC; AJ Tracey; Easy Life; Pale Waves; Sam Fender; Working Men’s Club; Self Esteem
Best Live Performance	Michael Kiwanuka – End of the Road Festival	Nominees: The 1975 - Reading Festival; Stormzy - Glastonbury; Ariana Grande – The O2; The Courteeners - Heaton Park; The Streets – Brixton Academy; Florence & The Machine – BST Hyde Park; Doves – TCT at Royal Albert Hall; The Strokes – All Points East; Michael Kiwanuka – End Of The Road; Neil Young & Bob Dylan – BST Hyde Park
Best Solo Act	Stormzy	Nominees: Lewis Capaldi; Stormzy; Loyle Carner; Billie Eilish; Dave; Aldous Harding; Liam Gallagher; Florence Welch; Kae Tempest; Kano
Best Track	Lewis Capaldi — "Someone You Loved"	Nominees: People - The 1975; Vossi Bop – Stormzy; Bad Guy - Billie Eilish; Must I Evolve – JARV IS; Juice – Lizzo; Cellophane – FKA Twigs; Incapable - Róisín Murphy; Ladbroke Grove - AJ Tracey; Harmony Hall – Vampire Weekend; Someone You Loved – Lewis Capaldi
Best Festival/Event	All Points East	Nominees: All Points East; Glastonbury; Latitude; Isle Of Wight Festival; British Summer Time; Reading and Leeds Festival
Best Album	Foals — Everything Not Saved Will Be Lost – Part 1	Nominees: Eton Alive - Sleaford Mods; When We All Fall Asleep, Where Do We Go? - Billie Eilish; A Brief Inquiry Into Online Relationships - The 1975; Norman Fucking Rockwell - Lana Del Rey; Remind Me Tomorrow - Sharon Van Etten; Nothing Great About Britain - Slowthai; Everything Not Saved Will Be Lost (Part 1) - Foals; Psychodrama - Dave; Grey Area - Little Simz; Serfs Up - Fat White Family

=== 2018 ===
The winners of 2018 Q Awards are:

- Innovation In Sound: The Streets
- Classic Album: The Kinks - The Kinks Are The Village Green Preservation Society
- Maverick Award: Lawrence
- Play Award: Simon Neil
- Outstanding Contribution To Music: Noel Gallagher
- Legend Award: Nile Rodgers
- Inspiration Award: Trojan Records
- Icon Award: Ian McCulloch
- Lifetime Achievement Award: Brett Anderson

Award	Winner	Nominee
Best Act in the World Today	Paul Weller	Nominees: The 1975; Arctic Monkeys; Florence and the Machine; Kendrick Lamar; St. Vincent
Best Breakthrough Act	Goat Girl & Idles	Nominees: Amyl and the Sniffers; Bugzy Malone; Goat Girl; Idles; Jorja Smith; The Magic Gang; Nadine Shah; Nakhane; Novelist; Rejjie Snow; Tom Grennan
Best Live Act	Taylor Swift	Nominees: David Byrne; Liam Gallagher; Nick Cave and the Bad Seeds; Wolf Alice
Best Solo Artist	Noel Gallagher	Nominees: Christine and the Queens; Drake; Ed Sheeran; Janelle Monáe; Sophie
Best Track	Underworld and Iggy Pop — "Bells & Circles"	Nominees: The 1975 — "Love It If We Made It"; Childish Gambino — "This Is America"; Christine and the Queens — "Damn, dis-moi"; Goat Girl — "The Man"; Janelle Monáe — "Make Me Feel"; Underworld and Iggy Pop — "Bells & Circles"
Best Album	Let's Eat Grandma — I'm All Ears	Nominees: Anna Calvi — Hunter; Arctic Monkeys — Tranquility Base Hotel & Casino; Idles — Joy as an Act of Resistance; Interpol — Marauder; Let's Eat Grandma — I'm All Ears; Noel Gallagher's High Flying Birds — Who Built the Moon?

=== 2017 ===
The winners of 2017 Q Awards are:

- Icon Award: Liam Gallagher
- Innovation in Sound: Wiley
- Gibson Les Paul Award: Kelley Deal
- Inspiration Award: Manic Street Preachers
- Maverick Award: Viv Albertine

Award	Winner	Nominee
Best Act in the World Today	Ed Sheeran	Nominees: Adele; The 1975; Queens of the Stone Age; Depeche Mode
Best Breakthrough Act	Rag'n'Bone Man	Nominees: HMLTD; Shame; Stefflon Don; The Big Moon; Pumarosa; Girl Ray; Formation; The Moonlandingz; Sampha
Best Live Act	Liam Gallagher	Nominees: Stormzy; Lorde; Radiohead; The Killers
Best Solo Artist	Stormzy	Nominees: Ed Sheeran; Lana Del Rey; Liam Gallagher; St. Vincent
Best Track	Kasabian — "You're in Love with a Psycho"	Nominees: Ed Sheeran — "Shape of You"; Lorde — "Green Light"; Kendrick Lamar — "HUMBLE"; Liam Gallagher — "Wall of Glass"
Best Video	Sleaford Mods — "Bunch of Kunst"	Nominees: The The — "The Inertia Variations"; Our Friends — "Eagles of Death Metal: Nos Amis"; The Rolling Stones — "Havana Moon"; Iggy Pop & Josh Homme — "American Valhalla"
Best Album	Gorillaz — Humanz	Nominees: Kendrick Lamar — Damn; Stormzy — Gang Signs & Prayer; Sleaford Mods — English Tapas; The xx — I See You

=== 2016 ===
The winners of 2016 Q Awards are:

- Hero Award: Meat Loaf
- Classic Album: The Charlatans — Tellin' Stories
- Classic Songwriter: Ray Davies
- Innovation in Sound: M.I.A.
- Gibson Les Paul Award: The Edge
- Outstanding Contribution to Music: Blondie
- Hall of Fame: Madness

Award	Winner	Nominee
Best Act in the World Today	Muse	Nominees: Biffy Clyro; Coldplay; The 1975; U2
Best Live Act	U2	Nominees: Coldplay; Muse; Savages; Wolf Alice
Best Breakthrough Act	Jack Garratt	Nominees: Blossoms; Christine and the Queens; Gallant; Lady Leshurr; Let's Eat Grandma; Nothing but Thieves; Rat Boy; Spring King; The Amazons
Best Solo Artist	James Bay	Nominees: Michael Kiwanuka; Noel Gallagher; PJ Harvey; Skepta
Best Track	Bastille — "Good Grief"	Nominees: Biffy Clyro — "Howl"; Catfish and the Bottlemen — "Twice"; Skepta — "Man"; The 1975 — "Somebody Else"
Best Video	PJ Harvey — "The Community of Hope"	Nominees: Beyoncé — "Formation"; Coldplay — "Up&Up"; The 1975 — "A Change of Heart"; Wolf Alice — "Lisbon"
Best Album	The 1975 — I Like It When You Sleep, for You Are So Beautiful yet So Unaware of It	Nominees: Bastille — Wild World; Christine and the Queens — Chaleur Humaine; Coldplay — A Head Full of Dreams; David Bowie — Blackstar

=== 2015 ===
The winners of 2015 Q Awards are:

- Hero Award: Mark Ronson
- Classic Song: Queen — "Bohemian Rhapsody"
- Classic Album: Soul II Soul — Club Classics Vol. One
- Innovation in Sound: Gary Numan
- Gibson Les Paul Award: Tony Iommi
- Outstanding Contribution To Music: New Order
- Icon Award: Duran Duran

Award	Winner	Nominee
Best Act in the World Today	Foals	Nominees: Blur; Ed Sheeran; Muse; Noel Gallagher's High Flying Birds
Best Live Act	Royal Blood	Nominees: Catfish and the Bottlemen; Ed Sheeran; The Libertines; Mumford & Sons
Best New Act	James Bay	Nominees: The Bohicas; Circa Waves; Courtney Barnett; Jess Glynne; Slaves; SOAK; Songhoy Blues; Wolf Alice; Years & Years
Best Solo Artist	Ed Sheeran	Nominees: Kanye West; Noel Gallagher; Sam Smith; Taylor Swift
Best Track	The Libertines — "Gunga Din"	Nominees: Florence and the Machine — "What Kind of Man"; Foals — "What Went Down"; Mark Ronson — "Uptown Funk"; New Order — "Restless"
Best Video	Florence and the Machine — "Ship to Wreck"	Nominees: Foals — "What Went Down"; Miguel — "Coffee"; Muse — "Psycho"; The Weeknd — "Can't Feel My Face"
Best Album	Noel Gallagher's High Flying Birds — Chasing Yesterday	Nominees: Blur — The Magic Whip; Everything Everything — Get to Heaven; Florence and the Machine — How Big, How Blue, How Beautiful; Jamie xx — In Colour

=== 2014 ===
The winners of 2014 Q Awards are:

- Classic Album: Pink Floyd — The Dark Side of the Moon
- Maverick Award: St. Vincent
- Classic Songwriter: Andy Partridge
- Gibson Les Paul Award: Johnny Marr
- Innovation In Sound: Jean Michel Jarre
- Inspiration Award: Simple Minds
- Hero Award: The Charlatans
- Icon Award: Wilko Johnson
- Idol Award: Culture Club
- Outstanding Contribution To Music: Richard Russell

Award	Winner	Nominee
Best Act in the World Today	Kasabian	Nominees: Arcade Fire; Arctic Monkeys; Kate Bush; Pharrell Williams
Best Live Act	Kasabian	Nominees: Arcade Fire; Arctic Monkeys; Jack White; Kate Bush
Best New Act	Sam Smith	Nominees: Ella Eyre; Fat White Family; FKA twigs; George Ezra; Hozier; London Grammar; Royal Blood; Temples; The 1975
Best Solo Artist	Ed Sheeran	Nominees: Damon Albarn; Jake Bugg; Paolo Nutini; St. Vincent
Best Track	Paolo Nutini — "Iron Sky"	Nominees: Kaiser Chiefs — "Coming Home"; Kasabian — "Eez-eh"; Lorde — "Royals"; Sam Smith — "Stay with Me"
Best Video	Jamie xx — "Sleep Sound"	Nominees: Arctic Monkeys — "Arabella"; Coldplay — "Magic"; Elbow — "New York Morning"; Paloma Faith — "Only Love Can Hurt Like This"
Best Album	Elbow — The Take Off and Landing of Everything	Nominees: The Black Keys — Turn Blue; Damon Albarn — Everyday Robots; Kasabian — 48:13; Manic Street Preachers — Futurology

=== 2013 ===
The winners of 2013 Q Awards are:

- Classic Album: Happy Mondays — Bummed
- Classic Songwriter: Chrissie Hynde
- Spirit of Independence: Belle and Sebastian
- Poet Laureate: John Cooper Clarke
- Icon Award: Suede
- Idol Award: Robbie Williams
- Outstanding Contribution To Music: Pet Shop Boys
- Best Event: Glastonbury Festival
  - David Bowie at the Victoria and Albert Museum
  - The Killers at the Wembley Stadium & The Garage, London
    Battle Born World Tour
  - Kraftwerk at the Tate Modern
  - Latitude Festival
  - The Rolling Stones at the Hyde Park, London
    50 & Counting

Award	Winner	Nominee
Best Act in the World Today	Vampire Weekend	Nominees: Arctic Monkeys; Biffy Clyro; David Bowie; Foals
Best Live Act	Foals	Nominees: Arctic Monkeys; Mumford & Sons; Muse; The Stone Roses
Best New Act	Jake Bugg	Nominees: Disclosure; Jagwar Ma; Laura Mvula; Palma Violets; Tom Odell; Toy; Valerie June
Best Solo Artist	Ellie Goulding	Nominees: David Bowie; Jake Bugg; John Grant; Laura Marling
Best Track	Arctic Monkeys — "Do I Wanna Know?"	Nominees: Daft Punk — "Get Lucky"; David Bowie — "Where Are We Now?"; Ellie Goulding — "Burn"; Robin Thicke — "Blurred Lines"
Best Video	Manic Street Preachers — "Show Me the Wonder"	Nominees: Beady Eye — "Shine a Light"; Daft Punk — "Get Lucky"; David Bowie — "The Stars (Are Out Tonight)"; Vampire Weekend — "Diane Young"
Best Album	Biffy Clyro — Opposites	Nominees: Daft Punk — Random Access Memories; David Bowie — The Next Day; Foals — Holy Fire; Vampire Weekend — Modern Vampires of the City

=== 2012 ===
The winners of 2012 Q Awards are:

- Classic Song: Dionne Warwick — "Walk On By"
- Classic Album: Manic Street Preachers — Generation Terrorists
- Spirit of Independence: The Cribs
- Innovation in Sound: Underworld
- Inspiration Award: Pulp
- Icon Award: Dexys Midnight Runners
- Hero Award: Johnny Marr
- Idol Award: Brandon Flowers

Award	Winner	Nominee
Best Act in the World Today	Muse	Nominees: Blur; Coldplay; Lady Gaga; The Stone Roses
Best Live Act	Blur	Nominees: Bruce Springsteen; The Cribs; Radiohead; The Stone Roses
Best New Act	Django Django	Nominees: Alabama Shakes; alt-J; Frank Ocean; Lianne La Havas
Best Solo Artist	Emeli Sandé	Nominees: Adele; Dizzee Rascal; Florence Welch; Noel Gallagher
Best Track	Plan B — "Ill Manors"	Nominees: Florence and the Machine — "Shake It Out"; Fun — "We Are Young"; Gotye — "Somebody That I Used to Know"; Rizzle Kicks — "Mama Do the Hump"
Best Video	Keane — "Disconnected"	Nominees: Arctic Monkeys — "R U Mine?"; The Killers — "Runaways"; Nicki Minaj — "Starships"; Noel Gallagher's High Flying Birds — "Everybody's on the Run"
Best Album	Bobby Womack — The Bravest Man in the Universe	Nominees: The Black Keys — El Camino; The Maccabees — Given to the Wild; Paul Weller — Sonik Kicks; Richard Hawley — Standing at the Sky's Edge

=== 2011 ===
The winners of 2011 Q Awards are:

- Next Big Thing: Lana Del Rey
- Classic Song: Snow Patrol — "Chasing Cars"
- Outstanding Contribution to Music: Siouxsie Sioux
- Icon Award: Noel Gallagher
- Innovation in Sound: Kaiser Chiefs
- Inspiration Award: Fat Boy Slim
- Hall of Fame: Queen
- Classic Songwriter: Gary Barlow
- Greatest Act of the Last 25 Years: U2
  - Arcade Fire
  - Arctic Monkeys
  - Beastie Boys
  - Björk
  - Coldplay
  - The Cure
  - Damon Albarn
  - Eminem
  - Green Day
  - Jack White
  - Jay-Z
  - Madonna
  - Manic Street Preachers
  - Metallica
  - Muse
  - Nirvana
  - Oasis
  - Paul Weller
  - The Prodigy
  - Radiohead
  - Red Hot Chili Peppers
  - R.E.M.
  - The Strokes
  - The Stone Roses

Award	Winner	Nominee
Best Act in the World Today	Coldplay	Nominees: Arcade Fire; Arctic Monkeys; Kasabian; Muse; U2
Best Live Act	Biffy Clyro	Nominees: Beyoncé; Biffy Clyro; Chase & Status; Elbow
Best New Act	WU LYF	Nominees: Everything Everything; Foster the People; Nero; The Vaccines
Best Breakthrough Artist	Ed Sheeran	Nominees: James Blake; Jessie J; Katy B; Miles Kane
Best Male Artist	Tinie Tempah	Nominees: CeeLo Green; Ed Sheeran; Example; Wretch 32
Best Female Artist	Adele	Nominees: Beyoncé; Jessie J; Laura Marling; PJ Harvey
Best Track	Adele — "Rolling in the Deep"	Nominees: Adele — "Someone like You"; Aloe Blacc — "I Need a Dollar"; Arctic Monkeys — "Don't Sit Down 'Cause I've Moved Your Chair"; Foster the People — "Pumped Up Kicks"
Best Video	Jessie J — "Do It like a Dude"	Nominees: Ed Sheeran — "You Need Me, I Don't Need You"; Foo Fighters — "Walk"; Hurts — "Wonderful Life"; Katy Perry — "Last Friday Night (T.G.I.F.)"; Lady Gaga — "Judas"
Best Album	Bon Iver — Bon Iver, Bon Iver	Nominees: Arctic Monkeys — Suck It and See; Elbow — Build a Rocket Boys!; The Horrors — Skying; PJ Harvey — Let England Shake

=== 2010 ===
The winners of 2010 Q Awards are:

- Hall of Fame: Take That
- Classic Songwriter: Neil Finn
- Next Big Thing: Clare Maguire
- Idol Award: Madness
- Hero Award: The Chemical Brothers
- Inspiration Award: Suede
- Innovation in Sound: Mark Ronson
- Classic Album: Wings — Band on the Run
- Icon: Bryan Ferry

Award	Winner	Nominee
Best Act in the World Today	Kasabian	Nominees: Arcade Fire; Green Day; Kings of Leon; Muse
Best Live Act	Green Day	Nominees: Kasabian; Lady Gaga; Muse; Pendulum
Best New Act	Mumford & Sons	Nominees: The Drums; Two Door Cinema Club; Wild Beasts; The xx
Best Breakthrough Artist	Plan B	Nominees: Ellie Goulding; Laura Marling; Lissie; Villagers
Best Male Artist	Paolo Nutini	Nominees: Brandon Flowers; Dizzee Rascal; Paul Weller; Plan B
Best Female Artist	Florence and the Machine	Nominees: Corinne Bailey Rae; Ellie Goulding; Lady Gaga; Laura Marling
Best Track	Florence and the Machine — "You've Got The Love"	Nominees: Biffy Clyro — "The Captain"; Mumford & Sons — "The Cave"; Owl City — "Fireflies"; The xx — "VCR"
Best Video	Chase & Status — "End Credits"	Nominees: Arcade Fire — "We Used to Wait"; Biffy Clyro — "The Captain"; Gorillaz — "Stylo"; Vampire Weekend — "Giving Up the Gun"
Best Album	The National — High Violet	Nominees: Arcade Fire — The Suburbs; Gorillaz — Plastic Beach; Paul Weller — Wake Up the Nation; Plan B — The Defamation of Strickland Banks

=== 2009 ===
The winners of 2009 Q Awards are:

- Icon Award: Marianne Faithfull
- Idol Award: Spandau Ballet
- Inspiration Award: The Specials
- Innovation in Sound: Sonic Youth
- Classic Album: U2 — The Unforgettable Fire
- Classic Song: Frankie Goes to Hollywood — "Relax"
- Legend Award: Edwyn Collins
- Classic Songwriter: Yusuf Islam
- Outstanding Contribution to Music: Robert Plant

Award	Winner	Nominee
Best Act in the World Today	Muse	Nominees: Arctic Monkeys; Coldplay; Kings of Leon; Oasis
Best Live Act	Arctic Monkeys	Nominees: Blur; Kasabian; Oasis; The Prodigy; Take That; U2
Best New Act	White Lies	Nominees: The Dead Weather; Empire of the Sun; Friendly Fires; Passion Pit
Best Breakthrough Artist	Mr Hudson	Nominees: Florence and the Machine; La Roux; Lady Gaga; Pixie Lott
Best Track	Lily Allen — "The Fear"	Nominees: Arctic Monkeys — "Crying Lightning"; Dizzee Rascal — "Bonkers"; Kasabian — "Fire"; Muse — "Uprising"; Noisettes — "Never Forget You"
Best Video	Lady Gaga — "Just Dance"	Nominees: The Dead Weather — "Treat Me Like Your Mother"; Dizzee Rascal — "Holiday"; Florence and the Machine — "Drumming Song"; Mika — "We Are Golden"
Best Album	Kasabian — West Ryder Pauper Lunatic Asylum	Nominees: Arctic Monkeys — Humbug; Florence and the Machine — Lungs; The Prodigy — Invaders Must Die; U2 — No Line on the Horizon

=== 2008 ===
The winners of 2008 Q Awards are:

- Classic Song: Meat Loaf — "Bat Out of Hell"
- Classic Songwriter: John Mellencamp
- Innovation in Sound: Massive Attack
- Outstanding Contribution to Music: David Gilmour
- Legend Award: Glen Campbell
- Inspiration Award: Cocteau Twins
- Idol Award: Grace Jones
- Icon Award: Adam Ant

Award	Winner	Nominee
Best Act in the World Today	Coldplay	Nominees: Kings of Leon; Metallica; Muse; Oasis
Best Live Act	Kaiser Chiefs	Nominees: Kings of Leon; Nick Cave; Rage Against the Machine; The Verve
Best New Act	The Last Shadow Puppets	Nominees: Fleet Foxes; Glasvegas; The Ting Tings; Vampire Weekend
Best Breakthrough Artist	Duffy	Nominees: Adele; Bon Iver; Gabriella Cilmi; Santogold
Best Track	Keane — "Spiralling"	Nominees: Coldplay — "Violet Hill"; Duffy — "Mercy"; Katy Perry — "I Kissed a Girl"; The Ting Tings — "That's Not My Name"
Best Video	Vampire Weekend — "A-Punk"	Nominees: Coldplay — "Violet Hill"; Goldfrapp — "Happiness"; Hot Chip — "Ready for the Floor"; The Ting Tings — "That's Not My Name"
Best Album	Coldplay — "Viva la Vida or Death and All His Friends"	Nominees: Fleet Foxes — Fleet Foxes; The Last Shadow Puppets — The Age of the Understatement; Nick Cave — Dig, Lazarus, Dig!!!; Vampire Weekend — Vampire Weekend

=== 2007 ===
The winners of 2007 Q Awards are:

- Classic Song: Stereophonics — "Local Boy in the Photograph"
- Classic Album: The Verve — Urban Hymns
- Classic Songwriter: Billy Bragg
- Innovation in Sound: Sigur Rós
- Lifetime Achievement Award: Johnny Marr
- Merit Award: Ryan Adams
- Hero Award: Anthony H Wilson
- Legend Award: Ian Brown
- Inspiration Award: Damon Albarn
- Idol Award: Kylie Minogue
- Icon Award: Paul McCartney

Award	Winner	Nominee
Best Act in the World Today	Arctic Monkeys	Nominees: Foo Fighters; The Killers; Muse; U2
Best Live Act	Muse	Nominees: Arcade Fire; Arctic Monkeys; Kasabian; The Killers
Best New Act	The Enemy	Nominees: Cherry Ghost; Klaxons; The Pigeon Detectives; The View
Best Breakthrough Artist	Kate Nash	Nominees: Calvin Harris; Jack Peñate; Jamie T; Mika
Best Track	Manic Street Preachers — "Your Love Alone Is Not Enough"	Nominees: Athlete — "Hurricane"; Hard-Fi — "Suburban Knights"; Kaiser Chiefs — "Ruby"; Muse — "Knights of Cydonia"
Best Video	Kaiser Chiefs — "Ruby"	Nominees: Björk — "Earth Intruders"; The Killers — "Bones"; Lily Allen — "Alfie"; The White Stripes — "Icky Thump"
Best Album	Amy Winehouse — Back to Black	Nominees: Arcade Fire — Neon Bible; Arctic Monkeys — Favourite Worst Nightmare; Kaiser Chiefs — Yours Truly, Angry Mob; Manic Street Preachers — Send Away the Tigers

=== 2006 ===
The winners of 2006 Q Awards are:

- Inspiration Award: a-ha
- Outstanding Contribution to Music: Smokey Robinson
- Groundbreaker Award: Primal Scream
- Icon Award: Jeff Lynne
- Idol Award: Take That
- Outstanding Performance Award: Faithless
- Classic Songwriter: Noel Gallagher
- Lifetime Achievement Award: Peter Gabriel
- Merit Award: Manic Street Preachers
- Innovation in Sound: The Edge
- Classic Song: Culture Club — "Karma Chameleon"
- Legend Award: The Who
- Award of Award: U2
- People's Choice Award: Arctic Monkeys
- Charity of the Year: War on Want

Award	Winner	Nominee
Best Act in the World Today	Oasis	Nominees: Coldplay; Muse; Red Hot Chili Peppers; U2
Best Live Act	Muse	Nominees: Arctic Monkeys; Oasis; Razorlight; Red Hot Chili Peppers
Best New Act	Corinne Bailey Rae	Nominees: Arctic Monkeys; The Kooks; Lily Allen; Orson
Best Track	Gnarls Barkley — "Crazy"	Nominees: Arctic Monkeys — "I Bet You Look Good on the Dancefloor"; The Feeling — "Never Be Lonely"; Scissor Sisters — "I Don't Feel Like Dancin'"; Snow Patrol — "Chasing Cars"
Best Video	The Killers — "When You Were Young"	Nominees: Gnarls Barkley — "Smiley Faces"; Kasabian — "Empire"; Scissor Sisters — "I Don't Feel Like Dancin'"; The Zutons — "Why Won't You Give Me Your Love?"
Best Album	Arctic Monkeys — Whatever People Say I Am, That's What I'm Not	Nominees: Kasabian — Empire; Keane — Under the Iron Sea; Muse — Black Holes and Revelations; Razorlight — Razorlight; Snow Patrol — Eyes Open

=== 2005 ===
The winners of 2005 Q Awards are:

- Inspiration Award: Björk
- Outstanding Contribution to Music: Paul Weller
- Icon Award: Jimmy Page
- Classic Songwriter: Nick Cave
- Lifetime Achievement Award: Bee Gees
- Innovation in Sound: The Prodigy
- Classic Song: Ray Davies — "Waterloo Sunset"
- Legend Award: Joy Division
- People's Choice Award: Oasis
- Best Producer: Gorillaz/Danger Mouse — Demon Days
- Birthday Honour: Michael Eavis
- Special Award: John Lennon

Award	Winner	Nominee
Best Act in the World Today	Coldplay	Nominees: Green Day; Muse; Oasis; U2
Best Live Act	U2	Nominees: Coldplay; Green Day; Muse; Oasis
Best New Act	James Blunt	Nominees: Hard-Fi; Jem; Kaiser Chiefs; The Magic Numbers; M.I.A.
Best Track	KT Tunstall — "Black Horse and the Cherry Tree"	Nominees: Coldplay — "Fix You"; James Blunt — "You're Beautiful"; Oasis — "The Importance of Being Idle"; U2 — "Vertigo"
Best Video	Gorillaz — "Feel Good Inc."	Nominees: Green Day — "Boulevard of Broken Dreams"; Gwen Stefani — "What You Waiting For?"; Oasis — "The Importance of Being Idle"; The White Stripes — "Blue Orchid"
Best Album	Oasis — Don't Believe the Truth	Nominees: Coldplay — X&Y; Goldfrapp — Supernature; James Blunt — Back to Bedlam; Kaiser Chiefs — Employment

=== 2004 ===
The winners of 2004 Q Awards are:

- Merit Award: Shane MacGowan
- Innovation in Sound: The Human League
- Inspiration Award: The Pet Shop Boys
- Classic Songwriter: Elton John
- Icon Award: U2
- Lifetime Achievement Award: Roxy Music
- Best Producer: Mick Jones (The Libertines — The Libertines)
  - Jerry Finn (Morrissey — You Are the Quarry)
  - The Neptunes (Kelis — Tasty)
  - Rich Costey, John Cornfield, Muse and Paul Reeve (Muse — Absolution)
  - Scissor Sisters (Scissor Sisters — Scissor Sisters)
  - Bobby Ross Avila, Bryan-Michael Cox, Destro Music, Dre & Vidal,
    James "Big Jim" Wright, Jermaine Dupri, Jimmy Jam and Terry Lewis,
    Just Blaze, Lil Jon, L.A. Reid, Rich Harrison, Robin Thicke, Usher (Usher — Confessions)

Award	Winner	Nominee
Best Act in the World Today	Red Hot Chili Peppers	Nominees: Coldplay; Muse; OutKast; Radiohead; U2
Best Live Act	Muse	Nominees: The Darkness; David Bowie; Madonna; Pixies; Red Hot Chili Peppers
Best New Act	Razorlight	Nominees: Franz Ferdinand; Kasabian; Keane; The Killers; Maroon 5; Snow Patrol; The Zutons
Best Track	Jamelia — "See It in a Boy's Eyes"	Nominees: Franz Ferdinand — "Take Me Out"; Goldie Lookin Chain — "Guns Don't Kill People Rappers Do"; Maroon 5 — "This Love"; Morrissey — "Irish Blood, English Heart"; The Streets — "Dry Your Eyes"
Best Video	Franz Ferdinand — "Take Me Out"	Nominees: Kelis — "Milkshake"; OutKast — "Roses"; Scissor Sisters — "Laura"; The Streets — "Fit But You Know It"
Best Album	Keane — Hopes and Fears	Nominees: Dizzee Rascal — Showtime; Franz Ferdinand — Franz Ferdinand; The Libertines — The Libertines; Scissor Sisters — Scissor Sisters; The Streets — A Grand Don't Come for Free

=== 2003 ===
The winners of 2003 Q Awards are:

- Inspiration Award: The Cure
- Icon Award: Jane's Addiction
- Classic Songwriter: Dexys Midnight Runners
- Lifetime Achievement Award: Duran Duran
- Special Award: Scott Walker
- Innovation in Sound: Muse
  - David Gray
  - Goldfrapp
  - Richard X
  - Super Furry Animals
- Best Producer: Nigel Godrich (Radiohead — Hail to the Thief)
  - Blur / Ben Hillier (Blur — Think Tank)
  - Dr. Dre (50 Cent — Get Rich or Die Tryin')
  - Ethan Johns (Kings of Leon — Youth & Young Manhood)
  - Pharrell Williams (The Neptunes — Clones)

Award	Winner	Nominee
Best Act in the World Today	Radiohead	Nominees: Blur; Coldplay; Foo Fighters; Red Hot Chili Peppers
Best Live Act	Robbie Williams	Nominees: Coldplay; The Darkness; Eminem; Queens of the Stone Age
Best New Act	The Thrills	Nominees: Athlete; The Darkness; Kings of Leon; The Rapture
Best Track	Christina Aguilera — "Dirrty"	Nominees: Coldplay — "Clocks"; Electric Six — "Danger! High Voltage"; Muse — "Time Is Running Out"; The White Stripes — "Seven Nation Army"
Best Video	Electric Six — "Gay Bar"	Nominees: Christina Aguilera — "Dirrty"; Coldplay — "The Scientist"; Junior Senior — "Move Your Feet"; Muse — "Time Is Running Out"
Best Album	Blur — Think Tank	Nominees: Feeder — Comfort in Sound; Radiohead — Hail to the Thief; The White Stripes — Elephant; 50 Cent — Get Rich or Die Tryin'

=== 2002 ===
The winners of 2002 Q Awards are:

- Classic Songwriter: Jimmy Cliff
- Special Award: Depeche Mode
- Merit Award: Elvis Costello
- Inspiration Award: Echo & the Bunnymen
- Best Producer:Moby (Moby — 18)
  - Rick Rubin (Red Hot Chili Peppers — By the Way)
  - Tony Visconti (David Bowie — Heathen)
  - Ken Nelson and Mark Pythian (Coldplay — A Rush of Blood to the Head)
  - Weezer and Tom Lord-Alge (Weezer — Maladroit)

Award	Winner	Nominee
Best Act in the World Today	Radiohead	Nominees: Coldplay; Oasis; Stereophonics; U2
Best Live Act	The Hives	Nominees: Muse; Oasis; The Strokes; The White Stripes
Best New Act	The Electric Soft Parade	Nominees: The Bees; The Cooper Temple Clause; The Coral; The Vines
Best Single	Sugababes — "Freak like Me"	Nominees: The Hives — "Hate to Say I Told You So"; Nickelback — "How You Remind Me"; Oasis — "The Hindu Times"; Red Hot Chili Peppers — "By the Way"
Best Video	Pink — "Get the Party Started"	Nominees: Eminem — "Without Me"; The Hives — "Hate to Say I Told You So"; Kylie Minogue — "Can't Get You Out of My Head"; Marilyn Manson — "Tainted Love"
Best Album	Coldplay — A Rush of Blood to the Head	Nominees: Doves — The Last Broadcast; Beth Orton — Daybreaker; Red Hot Chili Peppers — By the Way; The Vines — Highly Evolved

=== 2001 ===
The winners of 2001 Q Awards are:

- Classic Songwriter: Kate Bush
- Special Award: Brian Eno
- Merit Award: Elvis Costello
- Inspiration Award: John Lydon
- People's Choice Award: U2
- Best Producer: Nigel Godrich (Radiohead — Amnesiac)
  - Brian Eno and Daniel Lanois (U2 — All That You Can't Leave Behind)
  - Chris Shaw (Super Furry Animals — Rings Around the World)
  - Dan the Automator (Gorillaz — Gorillaz)
  - John Leckie (Muse — Origin of Symmetry)
  - Pat McCarthy (R.E.M. — Reveal)

Award	Winner	Nominee
Best Act in the World Today	Radiohead	Nominees: Manic Street Preachers; R.E.M.; Stereophonics; Travis; U2
Best Live Act	Manic Street Preachers	Nominees: Coldplay; Madonna; Muse; Stereophonics; U2
Best New Act	Starsailor	Nominees: Dido; Goldfrapp; The Strokes; Tom McRae; Turin Brakes
Best Single	Ash — "Burn Baby Burn"	Nominees: The Charlatans — "Love Is the Key"; Feeder — "Buck Rogers"; New Order — "Crystal"; Stereophonics — "Have a Nice Day"; Weezer — "Hash Pipe"
Best Video	Gorillaz — "Clint Eastwood"	Nominees: The Avalanches — "Frontier Psychiatrist"; Basement Jaxx — "Romeo"; Fatboy Slim — "Weapon of Choice"; I Monster — "Daydream in blue"; Nelly Furtado — "I'm Like a Bird"
Best Album	Travis — The Invisible Band	Nominees: Muse — Origin of Symmetry; PJ Harvey — Stories from the City, Stories from the Sea; Radiohead — Amnesiac; Stereophonics — Just Enough Education to Perform; U2 — All That You Can't Leave Behind

=== 2000 ===
The winners of 2000 Q Awards are:

- Merit Award: Jerry Dammers
- Songwriter Award: Guy Chambers and Robbie Williams
- Inspiration Award: Joe Strummer
- Best Producer: Artful Dodger (Artful Dodger — It's All About the Stragglers)
  - Dave Eringa and George Brakoulias (Toploader — Onka's Big Moka)
  - Dr. Dre (Eminem — The Marshall Mathers LP)
  - Guy Chambers and Steve Power (Robbie Williams — Sing When You're Winning)
  - Ross Robinson (Slipknot — Slipknot)

Award	Winner	Nominee
Best Act in the World Today	Travis	Nominees: Blur; Manic Street Preachers; Radiohead; Stereophonics
Best Live Act	Oasis	Nominees: The Chemical Brothers; Moby; Primal Scream; Travis
Best New Act	Badly Drawn Boy	Nominees: Coldplay; Doves; JJ72; Muse
Best Single	David Gray — "Babylon"	Nominees: Coldplay — "Yellow"; Eminem — "The Real Slim Shady"; Limp Bizkit — "Take a Look Around"; Moloko — "The Time Is Now"
Best Video	Kelis — "Caught Out There"	Nominees: Bloodhound Gang — "The Bad Touch"; Eminem — "The Real Slim Shady"; Red Hot Chili Peppers — "Californication"; Travis — "Coming Around"
Best Album	Coldplay — Parachutes	Nominees: Badly Drawn Boy — The Hour of Bewilderbeast; Doves — Lost Souls; Muse — Showbiz; Primal Scream — XTRMNTR

=== 1999 ===
The winners of 1999 Q Awards are:

- Classic Songwriter: Ian Dury and Chaz Jankel
- Best Producer: William Orbit
- Inspiration Award: New Order
- Special Merit Award: Keith Richards

Award	Winner	Nominee
Best Act in the World Today	Blur	Nominees: Manic Street Preachers; Oasis; Radiohead; R.E.M.; Stereophonics; U2
Best Live Act	Stereophonics	Nominees: Gomez; Nick Cave and the Bad Seeds; The Rolling Stones; Suede
Best New Act	Basement Jaxx	Nominees: The Beta Band; Gay Dad; Macy Gray; Shack; Travis
Best Single	Travis — "Why Does It Always Rain on Me?"	Nominees: Blur — "Tender"; Lauryn Hill — "Doo Wop (That Thing)"; New Radicals — "You Get What You Give"; Supergrass — "Moving"; TLC — "No Scrubs"
Best Album	The Chemical Brothers — Surrender	Nominees: Blur — 13; Mercury Rev — Deserter's Songs; Stereophonics — Performance and Cocktails; Texas — The Hush; Travis — The Man Who

=== 1998 ===
The winners of 1998 Q Awards are:

- Songwriter Award: Paul Weller
- Inspiration Award: Blondie
- Lifetime Achievement Award: R.E.M.
- Best Producer: Fatboy Slim (Fatboy Slim — You've Come a Long Way, Baby)
  - Billy Corgan (The Smashing Pumpkins — "Adore")
  - Mike Hedges (Manic Street Preachers — "This Is My Truth Tell Me Yours")
  - Neil Finn (Neil Finn — "Try Whistling This")
  - William Orbit (Madonna — "Ray of Light")

Award	Winner	Nominee
Best Act in the World Today	Manic Street Preachers	Nominees: Oasis; Radiohead; R.E.M.; The Verve
Best Live Act	Roni Size & Reprazent	Nominees: Fun Lovin' Criminals; Paul Weller; Pulp; The Verve
Best New Act	Gomez	Nominees: Air; Catatonia; Embrace; Theaudience
Best Single	Catatonia — "Road Rage"	Nominees: Beastie Boys — "Intergalactic"; Cornershop — "Brimful of Asha"; Fatboy Slim — "The Rockafeller Skank"; Manic Street Preachers — "If You Tolerate This Your Children Will Be Next"
Best Album	Massive Attack — "Mezzanine"	Nominees: The Corrs — Talk on Corners; Manic Street Preachers — This Is My Truth Tell Me Yours; Pulp — This Is Hardcore; The Smashing Pumpkins — Adore

=== 1997 ===
The winners of 1997 Q Awards are:

- Best Producer: Nellee Hooper
- Best Reissue/Compilation: Various Artists — The Songs of Jimmie Rodgers
- Songwriter Award: Paul McCartney
- Inspiration Award: Patti Smith
- Lifetime Achievement Award: The Who
- Special Award: Phil Spector

Award	Winner	Nominee
Best Act in the World Today	Oasis	
Best Live Act	The Prodigy	Nominees: Beck; Oasis; Radiohead; The Verve
Best New Act	Fun Lovin' Criminals	
Best Album	Radiohead — OK Computer	Nominees: Fun Lovin' Criminals — Come Find Yourself; Oasis — Be Here Now; The Prodigy — The Fat of the Land; Texas — White on Blonde

=== 1996 ===
The winners of 1996 Q Awards are:

- Best Producer: John Leckie
- Best Reissue/Compilation: The Beatles — The Beatles Anthology
- Inspiration Award: U2
- Lifetime Achievement Award: Rod Stewart
- Merit Award: Elvis Costello

Award	Winner	Nominee
Best Act in the World Today	Oasis	
Best Live Act	Pulp	
Best New Act	Alanis Morissette	
Best Album	Manic Street Preachers — Everything Must Go	

=== 1995 ===
The winners of 1995 Q Awards are:

- Best Producer: Tricky
- Best Reissue/Compilation: Various Artists — The Help Album
- Inspiration Award: David Bowie / Brian Eno
- Merit Award: Eric Clapton
- Songwriter Award: Van Morrison

Award	Winner	Nominee
Best Act in the World Today	R.E.M.	
Best Live Act	Oasis	
Best New Act	Supergrass	
Best Album	Blur — The Great Escape	

=== 1994 ===
The winners of 1994 Q Awards are:

- Best Producer: Stephen Street
- Best Reissue/Compilation: Various Artists — The Tougher than Tough
- Inspiration Award: The Kinks
- Merit Award: U2
- Songwriter Award: Morrissey

Award	Winner	Nominee
Best Act in the World Today	R.E.M.	
Best Live Act	Pink Floyd	
Best New Act	Oasis	
Best Album	Blur — Parklife	

=== 1993 ===
The winners of 1993 Q Awards are:

- Best Producer: Flood Brian Eno The Edge/Zooropa
- Best Reissue/Compilation: The Beach Boys — Good Vibrations: Thirty Years of The Beach Boys
- Inspiration Award: Donald Fagen
- Merit Award: Elton John
- Songwriter Award: Neil Finn

Award	Winner	Nominee
Best Act in the World Today	U2	
Best Live Act	Neil Young	
Best New Act	Suede	
Best Album	Sting — Ten Summoner's Tales	

=== 1992 ===
The winners of 1992 Q Awards are:

- Best Producer: Daniel Lanois Peter Gabriel The Orb
- Best Reissue/Compilation: Bob Marley — Songs of Freedom
- Inspiration Award: B.B. King
- Merit Award: Led Zeppelin
- Songwriter Award: U2

Award	Winner	Nominee
Best Act in the World Today	U2	
Best Live Act	Crowded House	
Best New Act	Tori Amos	Nominees: Suede; Sophie B. Hawkins; Sugar; Pearl Jam
Best Album	R.E.M. — Automatic for the People	

=== 1991 ===
The winners of 1991 Q Awards are:

- Best Producer: Trevor Horn (Seal — Seal)
- Merit Award: Lou Reed
- Songwriter Award: Richard Thompson

Award	Winner	Nominee
Best Act in the World Today	R.E.M. / U2	
Best Live Act	Simple Minds	
Best New Act	Seal	
Best Album	R.E.M. — Out of Time	

=== 1990 ===
The winners of 1990 Q Awards are:

- Best Producer: Paul Oakenfold / Steve Osborne (Happy Mondays — Pills 'n' Thrills and Bellyaches)
- Best Reissue/Compilation: The Beach Boys — Pet Sounds
- Merit Award: Paul McCartney
- Songwriter Award: Prince

Award	Winner	Nominee
Best Act in the World Today	U2	
Best Live Act	The Rolling Stones	
Best New Act	They Might Be Giants	
Best Album	World Party — Goodbye Jumbo	

== Criticism ==
At the 2006 Q Awards, Arctic Monkeys frontman Alex Turner criticised the choice of Take That for the "Idol" award. Commenting on the winners of the night, he said:

A lot of people make jokes about having awards for no reason just for the sake of having awards, and pretending they were good when they weren't. I'm not old enough to know a lot of them, but even I know Take That were bollocks.
