= Tell Me It's a Dream =

Studio album by Rosa Walton
- Released: 5 June 2026
- Studios: StudiOwz, Wales
- Genres: Synth-pop; indie pop; alternative pop
- Length: 34:41
- Label: Transgressive
- Producers: Rosa Walton; David Wrench

Singles from Tell Me It's a Dream
- 1. "Sorry Anyway" Released: 5 March 2026; 2. "Halfway Round the World" Released: 9 April 2026; 3. "Heart to Heartbreak" Released: 7 May 2026

Tell Me It's a Dream is the debut solo studio album by the English musician Rosa Walton. It was released on 5 June 2026 through Transgressive Records. Walton produced the album with David Wrench, and it was recorded at StudiOwz in Wales after songs that began during COVID-19 lockdown sessions with Sam E. Yamaha.

The album moves between synth-pop, indie pop, alternative pop, and guitar-led pop styles. It was preceded by the singles "Sorry Anyway", "Halfway Round the World", and "Heart to Heartbreak". Tell Me It's a Dream received generally favourable reviews from critics, according to Metacritic, and reached number seven on the UK Independent Album Breakers Chart. Reviewers generally described the album as a brighter and more direct solo debut than Walton's work with Let's Eat Grandma, while noting its 1980s pop references, hook-based songwriting, and moments of less immediate or more experimental arrangement.

== Background and recording ==
Walton first became known as a member of Let's Eat Grandma with Jenny Hollingworth. Before announcing Tell Me It's a Dream, she had released solo material including "Turning Up the Flowers", "This Isn't It", and "I Really Want to Stay at Your House", the latter written for Cyberpunk 2077.

Walton began work on the album during COVID-19 lockdowns with Sam E. Yamaha and later returned to the material as her songwriting changed. The album was recorded during a stay at StudiOwz in Wales and co-produced by Walton and Wrench. The record includes contributions from guitarist John Victor, bassist Kam Khan, drummer Elena Costa, and Hollingworth, who appears as Jenny on Holiday on "Prettier Things".

In comments quoted by the Line of Best Fit and Transgressive, Walton said that the solo project began as a way to process experiences and became shaped by other musicians around her. She also described the album as being about ambition, freedom, and seeing beauty in the world. In a 2026 XS Noize interview, Walton said the album was not a solo project made to prove a point, but a natural place for songs that did not fit within Let's Eat Grandma. The same interview described the recording process as shaped by friendship, trust, and Walton's development of a different vocal style.

== Music and lyrics ==
Reviewers described Tell Me It's a Dream as a pop album that balances Walton's synth-pop background with guitar-based indie and alternative pop. In DIY, Bella Martin connected the album's synth-led songs "Heart to Heartbreak" and "When Will It All Reveal" with its guitar-pop and indie-pop tracks "Halfway Round the World" and "Prettier Things". Caleb Campbell wrote in The Line of Best Fit that the album moves between synth-pop and guitar-forward indie, with "Heart to Heartbreak" and "Sorry Anyway" using bouncy guitars, processed hooks, and direct pop choruses.

Joe Goggins of The Skinny characterised the album as 1980s revival pop and singled out hooks, dancier tracks, and the influence of the Cure on "Halfway Round the World". John Murphy of MusicOMH described the album as alt-pop and wrote that "Wave Machine" draws on 1980s alt-pop, including references to the Cure, while "Halfway Round the World" has acoustic and jangly elements.

The album's lyrics and imagery were described by sources as hopeful and visually oriented. Campbell wrote that Walton and her collaborators often move towards hope and possibility, while identifying "July" as a quieter moment of self-acceptance. Transgressive stated that the album draws on imagery of light, colour, and open skies, and quoted Walton describing "Prettier Things" as a song about an imagined garden shared with another person.

In a track-by-track feature for Clash, Walton said that "Sorry Anyway" was written about not being constrained by a relationship or by other people's expectations, and that it was recorded with an intentionally unforced vocal take. She described "Prettier Things" as a song about an imagined garden shared by two people, with Jenny Hollingworth's guest vocal representing the other figure in the scene.

== Release and promotion ==
Walton announced Tell Me It's a Dream on 5 March 2026 and shared "Sorry Anyway" as its first single. The album was announced for release on 5 June through Transgressive Records. "Halfway Round the World" followed on 9 April 2026; Under the Radar described it as the second track taken from the album. "Heart to Heartbreak" was released as a single on 7 May 2026 through Transgressive.

Transgressive released the album on 5 June 2026. Apple Music listed the album as a nine-track release on Transgressive with a runtime of 34 minutes. Transgressive listed digital, CD, cassette, sky blue vinyl, and limited yellow vinyl formats; the yellow vinyl edition included the unreleased song "There's No Such Thing as Horses", and an album bundle included a neon pink 7-inch single with "I Really Want to Stay at Your House". Walton performed album-release week in-store shows and scheduled a UK tour for September 2026.

== Critical reception ==
Professional ratings
Aggregate scores
Source	Rating
Metacritic	79/100
Review scores
Source	Rating
DIY	4/5 stars
The Line of Best Fit	8/10
MusicOMH	4/5 stars
The Skinny	4/5 stars

At Metacritic, which assigns a weighted average score to reviews from critics, Tell Me It's a Dream received a score of 79 out of 100 based on four critic reviews, indicating "generally favorable reviews". Reviews discussed the album's bright pop sound, Walton's solo identity, and its relationship to Let's Eat Grandma.

Caleb Campbell of The Line of Best Fit gave the album an 8 out of 10 score in The Line of Best Fit, writing that its opening songs gave Walton's solo work a punchier immediacy while connecting the album to the guitar and synth elements that had appeared in Let's Eat Grandma's music. Joe Goggins gave the album four stars in The Skinny, describing it as a cathartic debut with an emphasis on 1980s-style hooks and detailed arrangements.

Bella Martin rated the album four stars in DIY, writing that it is joyful and colourful but not always immediate, and compared parts of its synth and indie-pop sound to Pale Waves. John Murphy gave the album four stars for MusicOMH, calling it a pure-pop turn from Walton while noting that "When Will It All Reveal" and "July" felt less fully developed than the album's hook-based songs.

== Track listing ==
All lyrics are written by Rosa Walton, except "Prettier Things" (lyrics written with Jenny Hollingworth); all music is composed by Rosa Walton and Sam E. Yamaha, except where noted.

Tell Me It's a Dream track listing
No.	Title	Music	Length
1.	"Heart to Heartbreak"		4:47
2.	"Sorry Anyway"		4:24
3.	"Taking the Roof Down"		3:47
4.	"Wave Machine"		5:25
5.	"When Will It All Reveal"	Rosa Walton	1:27
6.	"Halfway Round the World"		3:24
7.	"Prettier Things" (featuring Jenny on Holiday)	Walton; Yamaha; Jenny Hollingworth	3:36
8.	"July"	Walton	4:18
9.	"Romance Is Dead On"		3:33
Total length:			34:41

== Personnel ==
Credits are adapted from the album's liner notes and Tidal.

- Rosa Walton – vocals, piano, programming, synthesizer, production (all tracks); percussion (tracks 2, 3); glockenspiel, mandolin (6); guitar (8, 9)
- David Wrench – production, mixing, additional percussion (all tracks); engineering (5), background vocals (9)
- Matt Colton – mastering
- John Victor – guitars
- Kamran Khan – bass
- Elena Costa – drums (1–4, 6–8)
- Kapil Trivedi – drums (9)
- Owain Fleetwood – engineering (1–4, 6–8)
- Steph Marziano – additional production (6)
- Jenny on Holiday – featured vocals (7)
- Grace Banks – engineering (9)
- Nicole Ngal – cover photo
- Joni Fatora – design

== Charts ==
Chart performance for Tell Me It's a Dream
Chart (2026)	Peak position
UK Albums Sales (OCC)	49
UK Independent Albums (Official Charts)	21
