= I, Gemini =

Studio album by Let's Eat Grandma
- Released: 17 June 2016
- Genre: Pop
- Length: 48:04
- Label: Transgressive
- Producer: Will Twynham

Let's Eat Grandma chronology
I, Gemini (2016)	I'm All Ears (2018)

Singles from I, Gemini
- 1. "Deep Six Textbook" Released: 9 February 2016; 2. "Eat Shiitake Mushrooms" Released: 21 April 2016

I, Gemini is the debut album by British pop duo Let's Eat Grandma, released 17 June 2016 via Transgressive Records.

== Reception ==
Professional ratings
Aggregate scores
Source	Rating
AnyDecentMusic?	7.3/10
Metacritic	78/100
Review scores
Source	Rating
AllMusic	3.5/5 stars
Clash	9/10
DIY	2/5 stars
Dork	4/5 stars
The Guardian	4/5 stars
The Independent	4/5 stars
The Line of Best Fit	9/10
NME	4/5 stars
Pitchfork	7.3/10
Under the Radar	6.5/10

According to the review aggregator Metacritic, I, Gemini received "generally favorable reviews" based on a weighted average score of 78 out of 100 from 17 critic scores.

=== Year-end lists ===
I, Gemini on year-end lists
Publication	#	Ref.
Clash	32	
Crack	57	
The Line of Best Fit	26	
Loud and Quiet	14	
Louder Than War	18	
NME	34	

== Track listing ==
All tracks are written by Rosa Walton and Jenny Hollingworth. All tracks are produced by Will Twynham.

I, Gemini track listing
No.	Title	Length
1.	"Deep Six Textbook"	5:39
2.	"Eat Shiitake Mushrooms"	6:12
3.	"Sax in the City"	4:54
4.	"Chocolate Sludge Cake"	6:36
5.	"Chimpanzees in Canopies"	3:32
6.	"Rapunzel"	5:20
7.	"Sleep Song"	6:24
8.	"Welcome to the Treehouse, Pt. I"	2:47
9.	"Welcome to the Treehouse, Pt. II"	4:38
10.	"Uke 6 Textbook"	1:59
Total length:		48:04

== Personnel ==
- Jenny Louise Hollingworth – vocals, saxophone, keyboards, recorder, mandolin, drums, synthesizer, cello, triangle, percussion, glockenspiel
- Rosa Jewel Walton – vocals, keyboards, synthesizer, glockenspiel, drums, bass guitar, harmonica, mandolin, chimes, electric guitar, percussion, piano, ukulele
- Will Twynham – producer, mixing engineer
- Mary Epworth – production assistant
- Guy Davie – mastering engineer
- Tim Webster – mixing engineer
