= Pure Devotion (Overmono album) =

Studio album by Overmono
- Released: 7 August 2026
- Genres: UK garage; electronic; techno
- Length: 40:13
- Label: XL
- Producer: Overmono

Overmono chronology
Good Lies (2023)	Pure Devotion (2026)

Pure Devotion is the second studio album by Welsh electronic music duo Overmono, released on 7 August 2026 through XL Recordings. It received positive reviews from critics, and peaked at number 12 on the UK Albums Chart.

== Critical reception ==
Professional ratings
Aggregate scores
Source	Rating
Metacritic	78/100
Review scores
Source	Rating
AllMusic	3.5/5 stars
Beats Per Minute	70%
MusicOMH	4/5 stars
Paste	B
Pitchfork	7.4/10
PopMatters	8/10
The Skinny	4/5 stars

Pure Devotion received a score of 78 out of 100 on review aggregator Metacritic based on seven critics' reviews, indicating "generally favorable" reviews. Paul Simpson of AllMusic says, "Most of the tracks on Pure Devotion are effective, bringing the type of rush that Overmono are known for, but even as they're trying to branch out by trying new things in the studio, it does sound as if they're repeating themselves." Grant Sharples of Paste says the album's music style "feels that much more concrete, the emotion that much more palpable. It feels like they’re paying homage to dance music itself and its underlying creed of physicality above all else."

== Track listing ==
Pure Devotion track listing
No.	Title	Length
1.	"Lockup"	4:32
2.	"Knight in Shining Prada" (featuring John Joseph Holt)	4:17
3.	"Slowmotion"	3:03
4.	"Even Angels Ghost" (featuring Kindora)	4:23
5.	"Barum" (featuring Jaz Karis)	3:23
6.	"Mialon" (featuring Jaz Karis and Mahalia)	3:04
7.	"Laxbrook"	4:39
8.	"Gem Lingo (Ovr Now)" (featuring Ruthven)	3:50
9.	"Adre"	2:37
10.	"Ballad" (featuring Kindora and Rock Floyd)	3:10
11.	"After the Rain"	3:15
Total length:		40:13

== Charts ==
Chart performance for Pure Devotion
Chart (2026)	Peak position
Belgian Albums (Ultratop Flanders)	119
Scottish Albums (Official Charts)	7
UK Albums (Official Charts)	12
UK Dance Albums (Official Charts)	1
UK Independent Albums (Official Charts)	2
