= Two Ribbons =

Studio album by Let's Eat Grandma
- Released: 29 April 2022
- Recorded: Studio Bruxo, London
- Genre: Synth-pop
- Length: 38:55
- Label: Transgressive
- Producer: David Wrench; Let's Eat Grandma

Let's Eat Grandma chronology
I'm All Ears (2018)	Two Ribbons (2022)

Singles from Two Ribbons
- 1. "Hall of Mirrors" Released: 21 September 2021; 2. "Two Ribbons" Released: 11 November 2021; 3. "Happy New Year" Released: 4 January 2022; 4. "Levitation" Released: 24 March 2022; 5. "Give Me a Reason" Released: 28 September 2022

Two Ribbons is the third studio album by British pop duo Let's Eat Grandma, released 29 April 2022 by Transgressive Records.

== Background, writing, and recording ==
Billy Clayton, a 22-year-old pop singer and boyfriend of Let's Eat Grandma's Jenny Hollingworth, died from Ewing's sarcoma, a rare form of bone cancer, on 26 March 2019. Let's Eat Grandma subsequently cancelled their US tour, though they still played their previously announced slot at Coachella in tribute to Clayton.

This also came after a period of trouble in their friendship, which they first noticed in 2018 when they realised they could no longer finish each other's sentences. Rosa Walton moved from the duo's native Norwich to London, but felt burnt out and isolated while there. In this time, she wrote "Levitation" about a nervous breakdown she experienced. She later moved to Diss, Norfolk, near Norwich. Most of the album was written separately, a first for the duo. Their friendship recovered gradually as they came back together to work on the album in a series of Airbnbs in the small seaside town of Sheringham, Norfolk.

During the COVID-19 lockdowns, Walton and Hollingworth spent time walking to a nearby Norwich cemetery "partly because they were desperate to see nature, but partly to work through their grief" for Clayton, as well as musical collaborator Sophie who died from a fall in January 2021. These visits were the direct inspiration for "In the Cemetery". The duo recorded the album with producer David Wrench in London's Studio Bruxo intermittently over an 18-month period.

== Singles ==
Four singles were released prior to the album: "Hall of Mirrors" was released 21 September 2021, the title track came out 11 November, "Happy New Year" was released 4 January 2022, and "Levitation" came out 24 March 2022. The four singles all came with music videos, with the first two directed by El Hardwick and the last by Noel Paul. The video for "Happy New Year" depicts the duo in a tennis match against each other. A fifth music video was released for "Watching You Go" on 24 August, directed by Justin Chen, with Chen saying he wanted the video to "serve as a bridge between emotions while accurately portraying Jenny's plight during her grief. We thought that having a simple set up that centres the performance would be the most effective." A deluxe version of the album was released later in the year, including the song "Give Me a Reason" which was also released as the fifth single digitally and with a lyric video.

== Style and reception ==
Two Ribbons ratings
Aggregate scores
Source	Rating
AnyDecentMusic?	7.9/10
Metacritic	82/100
Review scores
Source	Rating
Clash	7/10
Exclaim!	8/10
The Guardian	5/5 stars
The Independent	4/5 stars
The Line of Best Fit	9/10
MusicOMH	4.5/5 stars
NME	4/5 stars
Pitchfork	7.7/10
Record Collector	4/5 stars
Under the Radar	8.5/10 stars

Clash's Tom Kingsley says that on the album, Let's Eat Grandma have "lost some of their charming oddity", with songs such as "upbeat, firework-sampling" "Happy New Year" and "richly patterned" "Hall of Mirrors" being comparable to Chvrches, a comparison which "would be a compliment to any band less fantastically original than" the duo. Regardless, this means "the music feels more direct as a result, more personal, which is a new strength that they're right to explore", and there's still songs like "Insect Loop" where "wackiness can still shine through the gloss on occasion." The Guardian's Alexis Petridis calls the album "compelling listening" and says it "offers a smorgasbord of Top 40 choruses and beautiful melodies, which makes the words more impactful."

Exclaim!'s Noah Ciubotaru notes how the "thirty-second ambient interlude" "Half Light" "cleanly splits the album in two, bridging pristine synth-pop and pastoral reverie." The songs ahead of that split "barrel ahead like life coming at you fast, underscoring the volatility buried beneath their exuberant tone", while those after are "a vista of mountain trails and endless sky ... conjured by sun-bleached guitar and twinkling glockenspiel". NME's Charlotte Krol says the first half "largely consists of glowing synth-pop" while the latter half is "tripped-out acoustic and moving balladry". Record Collector's Kate French-Morris writes that "like the fireworks that adorn opening track "Happy New Year", the duo's third album is glittering and huge, even in its quieter moments – and their most emotionally charged record yet."

Critics also consistently emphasise the influence that Clayton's death had on the album. Petridis says it "obviously impacts" the album and highlights the name of "In the Cemetery" and the lyrics from "Watching You Go" which are "about the bewildering manifestations of grief, from insisting that life must go on as before" with the lines "I'm not staying in, I'm not wasting it, I'm not" to "longing for oblivion" in the lines "I want to shed myself and lay back in the earth sometimes". The Line of Best Fit's Rachel Saywitz describes "In the Cemetery" as "gentle and wordless, scattered with birdsong and insect chirping" and "a reiteration of the running theme of Two Ribbons, charting a friendship that has been permanently changed through moments of loss and maturation." Pitchfork's Aimee Cliff compares the album to the dual process model of coping – "a model of grief counseling [which] claims that grief doesn't follow a logical trajectory of five stages—it's an ocean that comes in waves, a process of 'oscillation' [where] grievers are constantly thrown between periods of feeling OK, even hopeful, and periods of acutely feeling the loss of the past" – which the album presents as "a sequence of moments, bright and bleak and powerful."

=== Accolades ===
==== Awards ====
Two Ribbons awards
Year	Organization	Award	Status	Ref.
2023	Libera Awards	Best Pop Album	Nominated	

==== Year-end lists ====
Two Ribbons on year-end lists
Publication	#	Ref.
Albumism	69	
Clash	17	
The Forty-Five	27	
The Sunday Times	2	
Under the Radar	75	

== Track listing ==
All tracks are written by Rosa Walton and Jenny Hollingworth and produced by David Wrench and Let's Eat Grandma.

Two Ribbons track listing
No.	Title	Length
1.	"Happy New Year"	4:39
2.	"Levitation"	4:01
3.	"Watching You Go"	4:36
4.	"Hall of Mirrors"	5:12
5.	"Insect Loop"	4:18
6.	"Half Light"	0:30
7.	"Sunday"	4:55
8.	"In the Cemetery"	1:32
9.	"Strange Conversations"	3:48
10.	"Two Ribbons"	5:24
Total length:		38:55

- The vinyl edition of the album also includes a bonus 7" containing the song "Give Me a Reason", also written by Walton and Hollingworth and produced by the duo and Wrench.

== Personnel ==
- Let's Eat Grandma – producers, songwriters
- David Wrench – producer, mixing engineer, recording engineer, additional programming
- Grace Banks – assistant engineer
- Matt Colton – mastering engineer
- El Hardwick – photography
- Matt Barker – design

== Charts ==
Chart performance for Two Ribbons
Chart (2022)	Peak position
Scottish Albums (OCC)	12
UK Albums (OCC)	26
UK Independent Albums (OCC)	4
