= Heart Under =

Studio album by Just Mustard
- Released: 27 May 2022
- Studios: Attica Recording Studio, County Donegal, Ireland
- Genres: Noise rock; shoegaze; post-punk
- Length: 45:12
- Label: Partisan Records
- Producer: Just Mustard

Just Mustard chronology
Wednesday (2018)	Heart Under (2022)	We Were Just Here (2025)

Singles from Heart Under
- 1. "I Am You" Released: 19 November 2021; 2. "Still" Released: 23 February 2022; 3. "Mirrors" Released: 12 April 2022; 4. "Seed" Released: 24 May 2022

Heart Under is the second studio album by Irish rock band Just Mustard, released on 27 May 2022 through Partisan Records.

Following on from the release of debut album Wednesday in 2018, Heart Under marked a departure from that album's shoegaze sound, with many critics describing the album as noise rock.

== Background and release ==
On 19 November 2021, Just Mustard released the single "I Am You", which was reported to be part of the band's upcoming second album. On 23 February 2022, the band announced their second album, titled Heart Under, set to be released on 27 May, along with the release of single "Still". "Mirrors" and "Seed" were also released as singles prior to the release of the album. The album was recorded at Attica Studios in County Donegal and was self-produced, with the band stating that "they wanted Heart Under to feel like the experience of driving through a tunnel with the windows down".

== Critical reception ==
Professional ratings
Aggregate scores
Source	Rating
Metacritic	89/100
Review scores
Source	Rating
Clash	8/10
The Daily Telegraph	5/5 stars
DIY	4.5/5 stars
The Independent	4/5 stars
The Irish Times	4/5 stars
The Line of Best Fit	9/10
NME	5/5 stars
Paste	8.5/10
Pitchfork	7.7/10

Heart Under received critical acclaim from music critics upon its release. On review aggregator website Metacritic, Heart Under received a score of 89 out of 100 from eleven critic reviews, indicating "universal acclaim", whilst on Album of the Year, it has an average score of 85 out of 100 from 17 critic ratings.

Reviewing for the NME, Will Richards described Heart Under as "thrillingly untraditional noise rock" with the band having "left behind the shoegaze tag that has followed them around since the release of their debut" and described the band as a "a truly unique gem". Poppie Platt of The Daily Telegraph, also found Heart Under to be a departure from the group's shoegaze sound, describing it as "moody and dark, with industrial guitars and no typical choruses", in a five-star review. Max Freedman of Paste labelled the album as "a tornado of distorted dissonance", and claimed that it "places them among the vanguard of the British Isles' ever-crowded post-punk scene".

Robin Murray, writing for Clash, described Heart Under as a "striking, fantastically original work that taps into animalistic emotion", whilst Siobhán Kane wrote in The Irish Times that it "speaks to power of resilience". Writing for The Line of Best Fit, Kyle Kohner claimed that though "the decidedly blue atmosphere of Heart Under can be a bit one-note, albeit seldomly, it still frequently froths from lips, almost unceasingly, with the type of music you wish more post-punk revivalists, bedroom pop darlings, and even some shoegaze traditionalists would aspire to make more of".

== Track listing ==
All tracks written and performed by Just Mustard.

No.	Title	Length
1.	"23"	4:53
2.	"Still"	4:05
3.	"I Am You"	3:50
4.	"Seed"	4:48
5.	"Blue Chalk"	5:01
6.	"Early"	3:49
7.	"Sore"	4:24
8.	"Mirrors"	4:17
9.	"In Shade"	4:38
10.	"Rivers"	5:27
Total length:		45:12

== Personnel ==
Adapted from liner notes

Just Mustard

- Katie Ball – vocals, tambourine
- David Noonan – guitar, vocals
- Mete Kalyoncuoglu – guitar
- Robert Hodgers Clarke – bass guitar
- Shane Maguire – drums, percussion

Additional personnel

- Chris W. Ryan – engineering
- David Noonan – engineering
- Joe LaPorta – mastering
- David Wrench - mixing, additional production
- Graham Dean – art
- Hermes Miranda – photography
- Molly Keane – graphic design

== Charts ==
Weekly chart performance for Heart Under
Chart (2022)	Peak position
Irish Albums (IRMA)	17
Scottish Albums (Official Charts)	15
UK Albums (Official Charts)	33
