= Good Lies =

Studio album by Overmono
- Released: 12 May 2023
- Genres: 2-step garage; techno; pop
- Length: 47:58
- Label: XL
- Producer: Overmono

Overmono chronology
Cash Romantic (2022)	Good Lies (2023)	Pure Devotion (2026)

Good Lies is the debut studio album by Welsh electronic music duo Overmono, released on 12 May 2023 through XL Recordings. It received positive reviews from critics, and debuted at number 11 on the UK Albums Chart.

== Critical reception ==
Professional ratings
Aggregate scores
Source	Rating
AnyDecentMusic?	7.8/10
Metacritic	83/100
Review scores
Source	Rating
AllMusic	4/5 stars
Clash	8/10
Evening Standard	4/5 stars
The Guardian	4/5 stars
MusicOMH	3/5 stars
NME	4/5 stars
The Observer	5/5 stars
Pitchfork	7.7/10
Sputnikmusic	3.5/5
Tom Hull	B+

Good Lies received a score of 83 out of 100 on review aggregator Metacritic based on nine critics' reviews, indicating "universal acclaim". Kitty Empire of The Observer described it as "an album full of emotional ambushes" and wrote that the "Russell brothers mix weapons-grade nostalgia with two-step, trap and sped-up vocals". Paul Simpson of AllMusic found that Good Lies "continues in [a] sort of melancholic pop-influenced direction, while also including several surefire floor-fillers", highlighting the "more straightforward, hook-driven tracks" like "Is U" and "So U Kno". Will Pritchard of Pitchfork felt that the album "makes clear that Overmono haven't sacrificed intimacy or immediacy to the prospect of festival slots and pyrotechnics" and that it "toes a fine and, yes, functional, balance".

Alexis Petridis of The Guardian named it album of the week and wrote that it combines "garage with techno and chopped-up vocals", elaborating that "the pounding yet poppy debut album from Monmouth brothers Ed and Tom Russell is masterfully done" and calling it "a consistent album rather than a collection of tracks". Isabel Armitage of Clash wrote that Good Lies "refin[es] their production without chaotically jumping genre" and called it "the epitome of 2023 sound, the album breathes a continuously dynamic aura; a perfect picture of what electronic music is morphing into", remarking that the album "is an experience built upon legacy, brought to us through a partnership like no other". Will Richards of NME opined that the album "puts the pair on the edge of a major breakthrough. Its pop-leaning moments are also its most exciting, and the creativity and skill with which they bridge these worlds is thrilling".

Ben Devlin of MusicOMH singled out "Cold Blooded" and the "bloopy coda" of "Arla Fearn" as highlights, describing them as "genuinely enthralling, but they also indicate that Overmono are playing it safer than they need to. A signature sound is all well and good, but in the future the duo would benefit from indulging their inventive side more."

== Track listing ==
Good Lies track listing
No.	Title	Length
1.	"Feelings Plain"	2:49
2.	"Arla Fearn"	4:44
3.	"Good Lies"	2:40
4.	"Good Lies (Outro)"	1:06
5.	"Walk Thru Water" (featuring St. Panther)	3:14
6.	"Cold Blooded"	3:37
7.	"Skulled"	5:12
8.	"Sugarushhh"	3:37
9.	"Calon"	4:08
10.	"Is U"	3:48
11.	"Vermonly"	2:39
12.	"So U Kno"	5:43
13.	"Calling Out"	4:41
Total length:		47:58

Japanese edition (bonus track)
No.	Title	Length
13.	"Dampha"	5:51
Total length:		53:49

== Charts ==
Chart performance for Good Lies
Chart (2023)	Peak position
Belgian Albums (Ultratop Flanders)	84
Scottish Albums (Official Charts)	6
UK Albums (Official Charts)	11
UK Dance Albums (Official Charts)	1
UK Independent Albums (Official Charts)	3
