= I Really Want to Stay at Your House =

Single by Rosa Walton (as Hallie Coggins)

from the album Cyberpunk 2077: Radio, Vol. 2 (Original Soundtrack)
- Released: 18 October 2020
- Genre: Pop
- Length: 4:06
- Label: Lakeshore
- Songwriter: Rosa Walton
- Producer: Rosa Walton

Music video
- "I Really Want to Stay at Your House" on YouTube

"I Really Want to Stay at Your House" is a song written and recorded by British singer Rosa Walton for the 2020 video game Cyberpunk 2077. (Note: Walton is credited alongside Hallie Coggins, her fictional in-universe persona created for Cyberpunk 2077) Featured in the fictional radio station 98.7 Body Heat Radio, the song was included by Lakeshore Records on the soundtrack album Cyberpunk 2077: Radio, Vol. 2 (Original Soundtrack), which was released on December 18, 2020. The song would later on go viral in 2022 after being prominently utilised in the 2022 tie-in anime series Cyberpunk: Edgerunners, charting in the United Kingdom at number 68.

== In Cyberpunk 2077 ==
I Really Want to Stay at Your House is featured as one of the songs played on the fictional radio station 98.7 Body Heat Radio, which the player can tune in to while exploring the game's open world on foot or using vehicles. In the 2.1 update of the game, a dating feature was added wherein the player character V can dance to the song with their romantic partner.

== In other games ==
The song was added as selectable background music in the Arc System Works fighting game Guilty Gear Strive, alongside the addition of Lucy from Cyberpunk: Edgerunners as a playable guest character in 2025.

It was also used in the video game Wuthering Waves as part of their official crossover storyline with Cyberpunk: Edgerunners, which included multiple characters and locations from the franchise.

The track was added to Fortnite as a Jam Track on 20 September 2026 as part of the crossover with Cyberpunk: Edgerunners, which also saw the addition of Lucy as a playable outfit.

== Music video ==
A music video for the song was released on 3 October 2022, published to both the official Netflix and Cyberpunk 2077 YouTube channels. The clip was edited by Nicholas Fung and features a compilation of scenes from throughout the Cyberpunk: Edgerunners anime series which highlight the romantic relationship of main characters David and Lucy.

== Chart performance ==
After its inclusion in the anime series Cyberpunk: Edgerunners in 2022, the song charted at number 68 on the UK Singles Chart.

== Cover versions ==
On 11 December 2025 Bilmuri released a cover of the song via Spotify in promotion of The Game Awards.

== Charts ==
Chart performance for "I Really Want to Stay at Your House"
Chart (2022)	Peak position
Australia (ARIA)	86
Canada (Canadian Hot 100)	79
Global 200 (Billboard)	114
Ireland (IRMA)	84
Lithuania (AGATA)	79
UK Singles (Official Charts)	68
US Hot Rock & Alternative Songs (Billboard)	23

== Certifications ==
Certifications for "I Really Want to Stay at Your House"
Region	Certification	Certified units/sales
United Kingdom (BPI)	Silver	200,000^{‡}
United States (RIAA)	Gold	500,000^{‡}
^{‡} Sales+streaming figures based on certification alone.
