= I'm All Ears =

Studio album by Let's Eat Grandma
- Released: 29 June 2018
- Genre: Avant-pop; synth-pop
- Length: 51:27
- Label: Transgressive
- Producer: David Wrench; Sophie; Faris Badwan

Let's Eat Grandma chronology
I, Gemini (2016)	I'm All Ears (2018)	Two Ribbons (2022)

Singles from I'm All Ears
- 1. "Hot Pink" Released: 30 January 2018; 2. "Falling Into Me" Released: 21 March 2018; 3. "It's Not Just Me" Released: 18 April 2018; 4. "Ava" Released: 12 June 2018

I'm All Ears is the second studio album by the British musical duo Let's Eat Grandma, released on 29 June 2018, through Transgressive Records. Four singles preceded the release of the album: "Hot Pink", "Falling Into Me", "It's Not Just Me", and "Ava". The album received widespread acclaim from music critics.

== Release ==
The duo released the lead single of the album, "Hot Pink", on 30 January 2018, with a music video directed by Balan Evans released on 21 February, in which they stated they are "trying to navigate through a city where people's perceptions of reality are becoming more and more distorted in the fear that we'll end up the same way." The album was announced on 21 March alongside the release of the second single, "Falling Into Me", a song they said is "about getting to know someone and getting over your fears about feeling insecure." "It's Not Just Me" was released as the third single on 18 April with an accompanying music video also directed by Evans. The duo also announced a tour in promotion of the album, which will begin in late August. The fourth and last single preceding the album, "Ava", was released on 12 June 2018. According to the duo, the song explores "the realization as you get older that some things are more complicated, and from the outside looking at a person you can't always see how difficult some problems are to solve."

The album was released on 29 June 2018 on 2xLP, CD, cassette, digital download and streaming services through Transgressive Records.

== Critical reception ==
Professional ratings
Aggregate scores
Source	Rating
AnyDecentMusic?	8.0/10
Metacritic	85/100
Review scores
Source	Rating
AllMusic	4/5 stars
The Guardian	5/5 stars
The Independent	4/5 stars
Mojo	4/5 stars
NME	4/5 stars
The Observer	4/5 stars
Pitchfork	8.6/10
Q	5/5 stars
Rolling Stone	3.5/5 stars
The Times	4/5 stars

At Metacritic, which assigns a normalised rating out of 100 to reviews from mainstream publications, I'm All Ears received an average score of 85, based on 23 reviews, indicating "universal acclaim". The Guardian gave the album a perfect score, with Laura Snapes calling it remarkable. Rolling Stone's Will Hermes wrote, "Ultimately it's the spirit of adventure that runs through the entire enterprise that makes the diversity feel perfectly coherent, and timely. The future, after all, belongs to the young." Pitchfork critic Meaghan Garvey said, "I'm All Ears renders flattened communication as poignant, striking not because of the novelty of being made by teenagers but because it speaks with such commanding precision to the experience of a teenager in 2018.". Q critic Niall Doherty said the duo "revealed themselves as a rare, brilliant talent," while The Independent's Ilana Kaplan wrote, "As a record that's as lyrically compelling as it is sonically daring, I'm All Ears is an admirable follow-up to an impressive debut."

Writing for The Line of Best Fit, Saam Idelji-Tehrani stated "Reflecting Walton and Hollingworth's growth and maturation over a period of approximately two years, it is a creative and infectious record, which after repeat listens, moves from being intriguing to simply irresistible." Matthew Neale of Clash praised the album, saying "If they've perfected the modern pop template associated with acts like SOPHIE (on production duties here) - and they have - it's somehow not the most impressive element of the record. The second half of the album includes a pair of breathtaking epics, 'Cool & Collected' and 'Donnie Darko', that showcase a songwriting maturity well beyond their 18 and 19 years." AllMusic critic Heather Phares wrote, "By the time Let's Eat Grandma unite the album's different sounds on the exhilarating finale, 'Donnie Darko,' Hollingworth and Walton prove that a few more years under their collective belt haven't tamed their adventurous spirit—if anything, the way they challenge expectations on I'm All Ears is more exciting than ever."

=== Accolades ===
Accolades for I'm All Ears
Publication	Accolade	Rank	Ref.
The A.V. Club	Top 20 Albums of 2018	20	
Dazed	Top 20 Albums of 2018	5	
The Independent	Top 40 Albums of 2018	19	
The Line of Best Fit	Top 50 Albums of 2018	9	
Loud and Quiet	Top 40 Albums of 2018	13	
Louder Than War	Top 25 Albums of 2018	24	
MusicOMH	Top 50 Albums of 2018	19	
Mojo	Top 75 Albums of 2018	20	
Pitchfork	Top 50 Albums of 2018	32	
Q	Top 50 Albums of 2018	2	
Rough Trade	Top 100 Albums of 2018	11	
Uncut	Top 75 Albums of 2018	29	

== Track listing ==
All tracks written by Jenny Hollingworth and Rosa Walton and produced by David Wrench, except "Hot Pink" and "It's Not Just Me", co-written and produced by Sophie and Faris Badwan.

I'm All Ears track listing
No.	Title	Length
1.	"Whitewater"	1:57
2.	"Hot Pink"	4:08
3.	"It's Not Just Me"	3:55
4.	"Falling Into Me"	5:46
5.	"Snakes & Ladders"	5:57
6.	"Missed Call (1)"	0:37
7.	"I Will Be Waiting"	4:23
8.	"The Cat's Pyjamas"	1:05
9.	"Cool & Collected"	9:17
10.	"Ava"	3:04
11.	"Donnie Darko"	11:19
Total length:		51:27

== Personnel ==
Credits adapted from the liner notes of I'm All Ears.

Let's Eat Grandma

- Jenny Hollingworth
- Rosa Walton

Additional personnel

- David Wrench – production (tracks 1, 4–11), programming, mixing
- Faris Badwan – production (tracks 2, 3)
- Sophie – production (tracks 2, 3)
- Cecile Desnos – engineering
- Grace Banks – engineering (tracks 1, 4–11)
- Marta Salogni – engineering (tracks 1, 4–11)
- Darren Webb – engineering (tracks 2, 3)
- Max Heyes – engineering (tracks 2, 3)
- Matt Colton – mastering
- Yanjun Cheng – artwork

== Charts ==
Chart performance for I'm All Ears
Chart (2018)	Peak position
Belgian Albums (Ultratop Flanders)	164
Scottish Albums (OCC)	27
UK Albums (OCC)	28
