= Quicksand Heart =

Studio album by Jenny on Holiday
- Released: January 9, 2026
- Genres: Alternative pop; synth-pop
- Length: 39:40
- Label: Transgressive Records
- Producer: Steph Marziano

Singles from Quicksand Heart
- 1. "Every Ounce of Me" Released: 18 September 2025; 2. "Dolphins" Released: 16 October 2025; 3. "Good Intentions" Released: 11 November 2025; 4. "Quicksand Heart" Released: 8 January 2026

Quicksand Heart is the debut studio album by Jenny on Holiday, the solo project of British musician Jenny Hollingworth. It was released on January 9, 2026 through Transgressive Records.

== Critical reception ==
Professional ratings
Aggregate scores
Source	Rating
AnyDecentMusic?	7.3/10
Metacritic	72/100
Review scores
Source	Rating
Clash	8/10
DIY	3.5/5 stars
The Guardian	4/5 stars
The Line of Best Fit	6/10
Paste	B−
PopMatters	8/10
Pitchfork	7.3

On the review aggregator website Metacritic, Quicksand Heart has a score of 72 out of 100 based on 10 reviews, indicating "generally favorable reviews".

In an 8/10 review for Clash, Robin Murray praised Quicksand Heart as "a neat, trim, unified document" with Hollingworth engaging in a form of personal renovation outside of her work with Let's Eat Grandma. J. Simpson of PopMatters praised the album, writing that "Quicksand Heart is as good as pop gets. It finds the perfect equilibrium between authenticity and vulnerability and craft and accessibility." Daisy Carter of DIY noted the record lacks the experimentation of Let's Eat Grandma, but lauded its introspective qualities: "... as an exercise in self-actualisation, Jenny On Holiday's solo debut is indeed a revitalising break - one that underscores the small joys of living and points to blue skies ahead."

Taking a more critical tone, Tom Kingsley, writing for The Line of Best Fit, argued that "too much of Quicksand Heart feels rushed, or perhaps consciously unambitious, eschewing bold creative strokes in favour of the kind of inoffensive consistency you might put on at a cheese and wine night to set the mood."

== Track listing ==
All tracks are written by Jenny Hollingworth, except where noted.

Quicksand Heart track listing
No.	Title	Writer(s)	Length
1.	"Good Intentions"		4:18
2.	"Quicksand Heart"		3:41
3.	"Every Ounce of Me"	Jenny Hollingworth; Steph Marziano	3:43
4.	"These Streets I Know"		4:23
5.	"Pacemaker"		3:00
6.	"Dolphins"		4:47
7.	"Groundskeeping"		3:19
8.	"Push"		3:22
9.	"Do You Still Believe In Me?"		4:18
10.	"Appetite"		4:49
Total length:			39:40

Quicksand Heart - Limited Edition Vinyl track listing
No.	Title	Writer(s)	Length
11.	"Androgynous"	Paul Westerberg
12.	"Don't I Hold You"	Brendan Harney; Ricky Brennan Jr.; Scott Levesque

== Personnel ==
- Jenny Hollingworth – vocals (1–10), backing vocals (1–10), keyboard (1–5, 8–10), piano (7)
- Steph Marziano – drum kit (1–5, 8–10), synthesizer (1–10), piano (7)
- Jacob Berry – bass guitar (1–5, 7, 9–10), guitar (1–10), keyboard (1–5, 8–10), piano (6)
- Rosa Walton – backing vocals (1, 6)

== Charts ==
Chart performance for Quicksand Heart
Chart (2026)	Peak position
UK Album Downloads (Official Charts)	36
UK Independent Albums (Official Charts)	12
