= Let's Eat Grandma =

British pop group

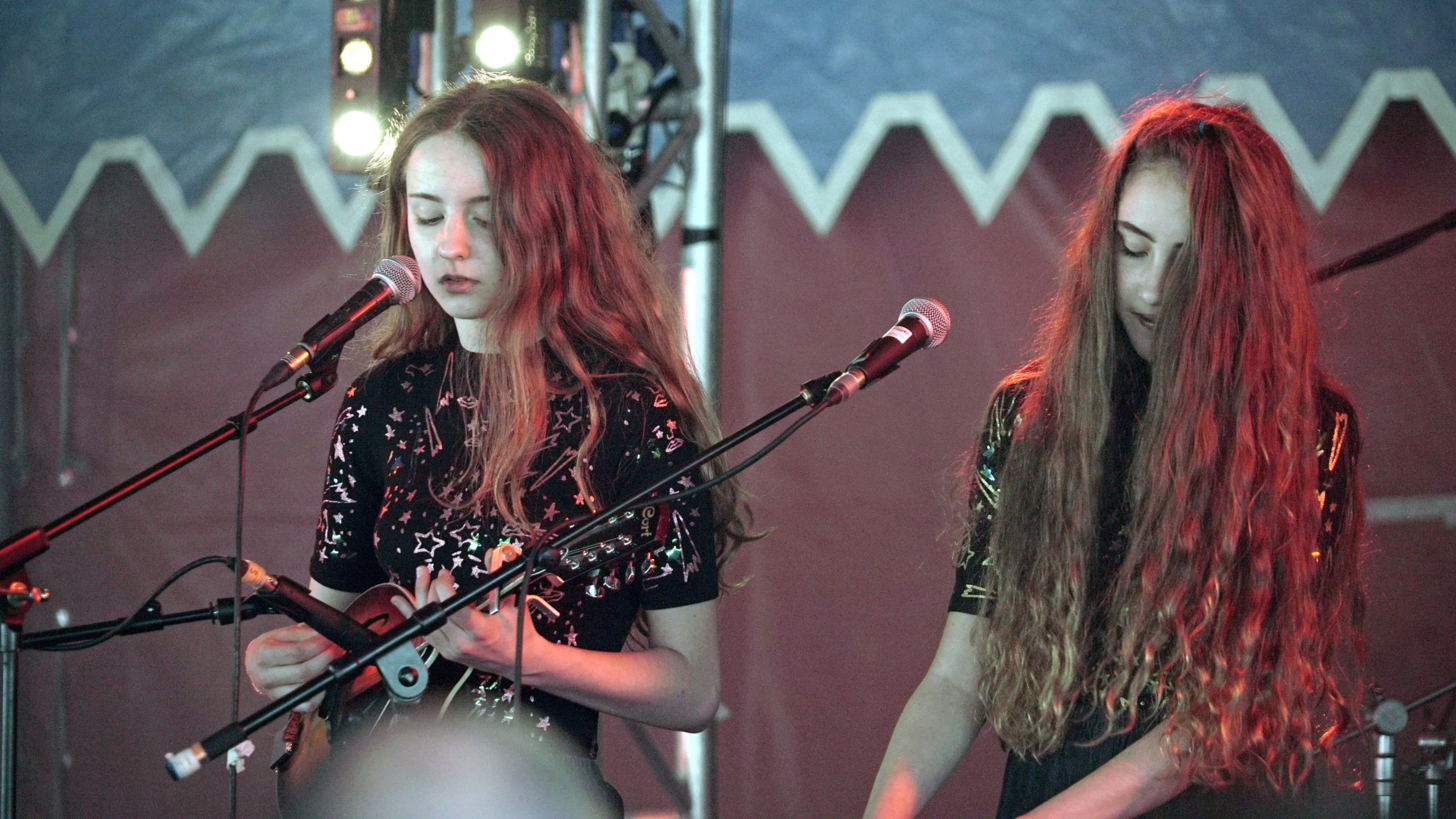
- Let's Eat Grandma in 2016: Jenny Hollingworth (left) and Rosa Walton (right)

Background information
- Origin: Norwich, England
- Genres: Experimental pop, futurepop
- Years active: 2013–present
- Label: Transgressive
- Members: Rosa Walton; Jenny Hollingworth
- Website: letseatgrandma.co.uk

Let's Eat Grandma are a British experimental pop duo formed in 2013 by Rosa Walton and Jenny Hollingworth. They released their debut studio album I, Gemini in 2016 through Transgressive Records. Their second studio album, I'm All Ears, was released in 2018, followed by Two Ribbons in 2022. Let's Eat Grandma describe their music as "experimental sludge pop".

== History ==
Rosa Walton and Jenny Hollingworth were both raised in Norwich, in Norfolk. They originally met in reception class when they were four, and began making music together at 13. They originally began creating music as a playtime activity, with their first songs being titled "The Angry Chicken" and "Get That Leg Off the Banister". Their band name is taken from a grammatical joke meant to emphasise the importance of comma placement. They became members of the local Norwich music scene, before they caught the attention of the musician Kiran Leonard, who passed their work on to their future manager.

Their debut album, I, Gemini, is composed of songs that were mostly written when Rosa and Jenny were younger. These songs include singles "Deep Six Textbook", which is about playing truant, and "Eat Shiitake Mushrooms", which was inspired by some graffiti the girls saw while walking around the city in Norwich. The album was released by Transgressive Records on 17 June 2016, and received positive reviews in NME, The Guardian, Pitchfork, and Q.

Their second studio album I'm All Ears was released 29 June 2018, and was preceded by the singles "Hot Pink", "Falling Into Me", "It's Not Just Me", and "Ava". I'm All Ears received widespread acclaim from music critics, and won Album of the Year at the Q Awards.

On 20 September 2021, the duo released a single, "Hall of Mirrors", accompanied by a video. In November 2021, they announced that their third album, Two Ribbons, would be released in April 2022, containing 10 songs, and released the title track and music video the same day. They worked with producer David Wrench on the production of this album.

=== Solo projects ===
Rosa Walton wrote the song "I Really Want to Stay at Your House" for the video game Cyberpunk 2077 which would go on to feature prominently in the 2022 anime series Cyberpunk: Edgerunners.

In 2026, Jenny Hollingworth launched her solo project Jenny on Holiday, releasing the debut album Quicksand Heart. Walton's debut solo album, Tell Me It's a Dream, was released on 5 June 2026.

== Discography ==
=== Albums ===
Album	Details	Peak chart position
Album	Details	UK
I, Gemini	Date released: 17 June 2016; Record label: Transgressive	149
I'm All Ears	Date released: 29 June 2018; Record label: Transgressive	28
Two Ribbons	Date released: 29 April 2022; Record label: Transgressive	26

=== Singles ===
Title	Year	Album
"Deep Six Textbook/Sink"	2016	I, Gemini
"Eat Shiitake Mushrooms"	2016	I, Gemini
"Rapunzel"	2016	I, Gemini
"Sax in the City"	2016	I, Gemini
"Hot Pink"	2018	I'm All Ears
"Falling Into Me"	2018	I'm All Ears
"It's Not Just Me"	2018	I'm All Ears
"Ava"	2018	I'm All Ears
"Hall of Mirrors"	2021	Two Ribbons
"Two Ribbons"	2021	Two Ribbons
"Happy New Year"	2022	Two Ribbons
"Levitation"	2022	Two Ribbons
"Give Me a Reason"	2022	Two Ribbons (Deluxe)

== Music videos ==
- "Deep Six Textbook" (2016)
- "Eat Shiitake Mushrooms" (2016)
- "Sax in the City" (2016)
- "Hot Pink" (2018)
- "It's Not Just Me" (2018)
- "Hall of Mirrors" (2021)
- "Two Ribbons" (2021)
- "Happy New Year" (2022)
- "Levitation" (2022)
- "Watching You Go" (2022)
