= Overmono =

Welsh electronic music duo

- Overmono performing at Rock en Seine in August 2023

Background information
- Origin: Overmonnow, Monmouth, Wales
- Genres: UK garage; electronic
- Years active: 2015–present
- Labels: XL Recordings; AD 93
- Members: Tom Russell; Ed Russell
- Website: Official website

Overmono are a Welsh electronic music duo formed in 2015 consisting of the brothers Tom and Ed Russell. Their name originates from Overmonnow, the Welsh suburb in which they originated from.

After releasing extended plays for a few years, the duo has released two studio albums: their debut album, Good Lies was released in 2023, and their second album, Pure Devotion, was released in 2026.

== History ==
Prior to the formation of Overmono, Tom and Ed Russell both explored solo careers. Under the name 'Truss', Tom produced hard techno; as 'Tessela', Ed produced drum and bass and rave-inspired tracks including 2013's "Hackney Parrot". The brothers also performed together for a brief time in 2012 under the name 'TR/ER'. In 2015, the duo began producing music together, with their first EP, Arla, being released on XL Recordings in 2016.

Alongside XL, the duo released music on their own label, Poly Kicks, founded by Ed in 2013. The label has also released music from Joy Orbison and Special Request, as well as the pair's remix of For Those I Love's "I Have A Love," released in 2020.

In 2021, the duo won 'UK's Best Live Act' at DJ Mag's Best of British award.

Overmono has frequently collaborated with Joy Orbison. Their first release as a trio was with 2019's "Bromley" / "Still Moving", released on XL Recordings under the portmanteau 'Joy Overmono'. Their second release was in 2022 with "Blind Date", featuring a vocal sample from artist Abra.

In April 2023, Overmono performed at the 22nd Coachella Valley Music and Arts Festival. The following month, their debut studio album, Good Lies, was released on 12 May 2023 through XL Recordings. The album peaked at number 11 on the UK Albums Chart and gained an average Metacritic rating of 83 out of 100 based on 9 critics' reviews, signifying "universal acclaim".

In 2025, Overmono headlined the West Holts stage at Glastonbury, followed by headline performances at Boomtown and AVA Festival.

In 2026, their second studio album, Pure Devotion, was released on 7 August 2026 through XL Recordings. That same year, the duo also provided additional soundtrack for the video game Grand Theft Auto VI.

== Discography ==
=== Studio albums ===
- Good Lies (XL Recordings, 12 May 2023)
- Pure Devotion (XL Recordings, 7 August 2026)

=== EPs ===
- Arla I (XL Recordings, 29 July 2016)
- Arla II (XL Recordings, 10 March 2017)
- Arla III (XL Recordings, 24 November 2017)
- Raft Living (Poly Kicks, 5 October 2018)
- Whities 019 (AD 93, 7 December 2018)
- Everything U Need (XL Recordings, 6 November 2020)
- Cash Romantic (XL Recordings, 8 April 2022)

=== Singles ===
- "POLY011" (Poly Kicks, 1 November 2019)
- "Bromley" / "Still Moving" (XL Recordings, 22 November 2019)
- "Pieces of 8" / "Echo Rush" (XL Recordings, 8 April 2021)
- "If U Ever" (fabric Records, 12 May 2021)
- "BMW Track" / "So U Kno" (Poly Kicks, 16 June 2021)
- "Diamond Cut" / "Bby" (XL Recordings, 19 November 2021)
- "Blind Date" (XL Recordings, 23 September 2022)
- "Walk Thru Water" (XL Recordings, 17 November 2022)
- "Is U" (XL Recordings, 18 January 2023)
- "Calling Out" (XL Recordings, 22 February 2023)
- "Good Lies" (XL Recordings, 31 March 2023)
- "Freedom 2" (with Kwengface & Joy Orbison) (Kwengface LTD, 5 August 2023)
- "Blow Out" (XL Recordings, 7 September 2023)
- "Stayinit" (with Fred again.. & Lil Yachty) (Atlantic Records UK, 28 February 2024)
- "Turn the Page" (with the Streets) (XL Recordings, 24 April 2024)
- ”Gem Lingo (Ovr Now)” (with Ruthven) (XL Recordings, 17 July 2024)
- "Lippy" (with Skiifall and Joy Orbison) (XL Recordings, 23 June 2025)
- "Paradise Runner" (with Skiifall and Joy Orbison) (XL Recordings, 21 November 2025)
- "Lockup" (XL, 12 May 2026)

=== Mixes ===
- Fabric presents Overmono (Mixed) (Fabric Records, 16 July 2021)

=== Remixes ===
- Nathan Fake, Prurient - "Degreelessness (Overmono Remix)" (2017), Ninja Tune
- Four Tet - "Teenage Birdsong (Overmono Remix)" (2019), Text Records
- Thom Yorke - "Not the News (Overmono Remix 1)" (2020), Poly Kicks
- Thom Yorke - "Not the News (Overmono Remix 2)" (2020), Poly Kicks
- For Those I Love - "I Have a Love (Overmono Remix)" (2020), September Recordings
- Ed Sheeran - "Eyes Closed (Overmono Remix)" (2023), Asylum Records
