= Just Mustard =

Irish band

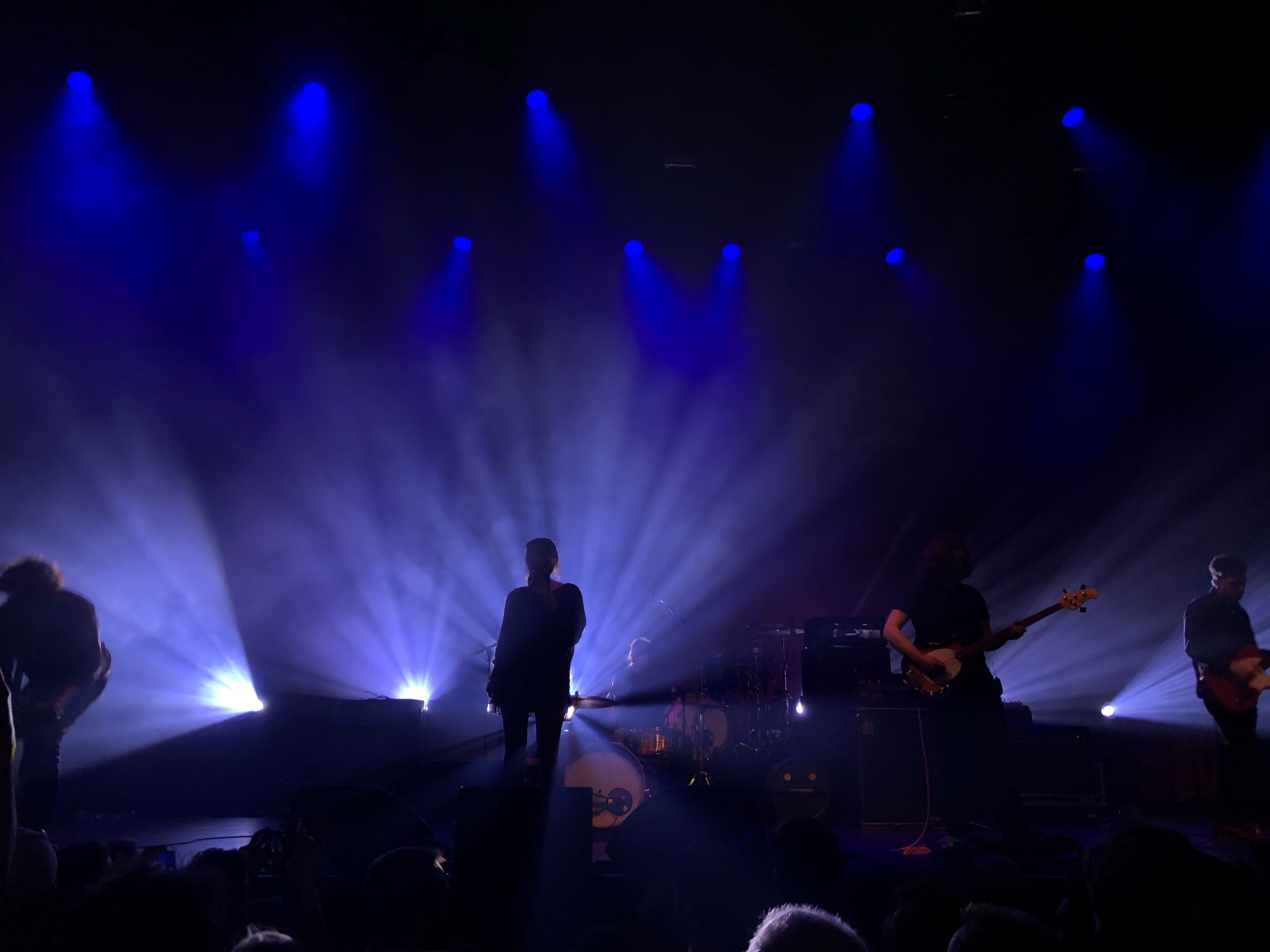
- Just Mustard performing at Tivoli, Utrecht, April 2022

Background information
- Origin: Dundalk, Ireland
- Genres: Noise rock; trip hop; shoegaze; post-punk
- Years active: 2015–present
- Labels: Partisan Records; Pizza Pizza Records
- Members: Katie Ball; David Noonan; Mete Kalyon; Rob Clarke; Shane Maguire
- Website: justmustard.ie

Just Mustard are an Irish experimental rock band from Dundalk in County Louth, having formed in 2015.

== Career ==
Just Mustard have been influenced by industrial, hip-hop, and Irish music. They have cited acts including Portishead and Angelo Badalamenti. Elsewhere, the band have noted Warpaint, the Pogues, OMD, and DMZ as inspirations.

The band's debut album, Wednesday, was released in 2018 through Pizza Pizza Records. Self-produced and recorded by the band in their home studio in Dundalk and in Start Together Studios, Belfast, with recording engineer Chris Ryan, Wednesday was nominated for the Choice Music Prize in 2018.

In 2020, the band signed to Brooklyn-based label Partisan Records, which released their sophomore album, Heart Under, in May 2022. The album peaked at No. 17 in the Irish albums chart and received critical acclaim upon its release.

In October 2025, the band released their third album, We Were Just Here.

== Personnel ==
- Katie Ball (vocals)
- David Noonan (guitar/vocals)
- Mete Kalyon (guitar)
- Rob Clarke (bass)
- Shane Maguire (drums)

== Discography ==
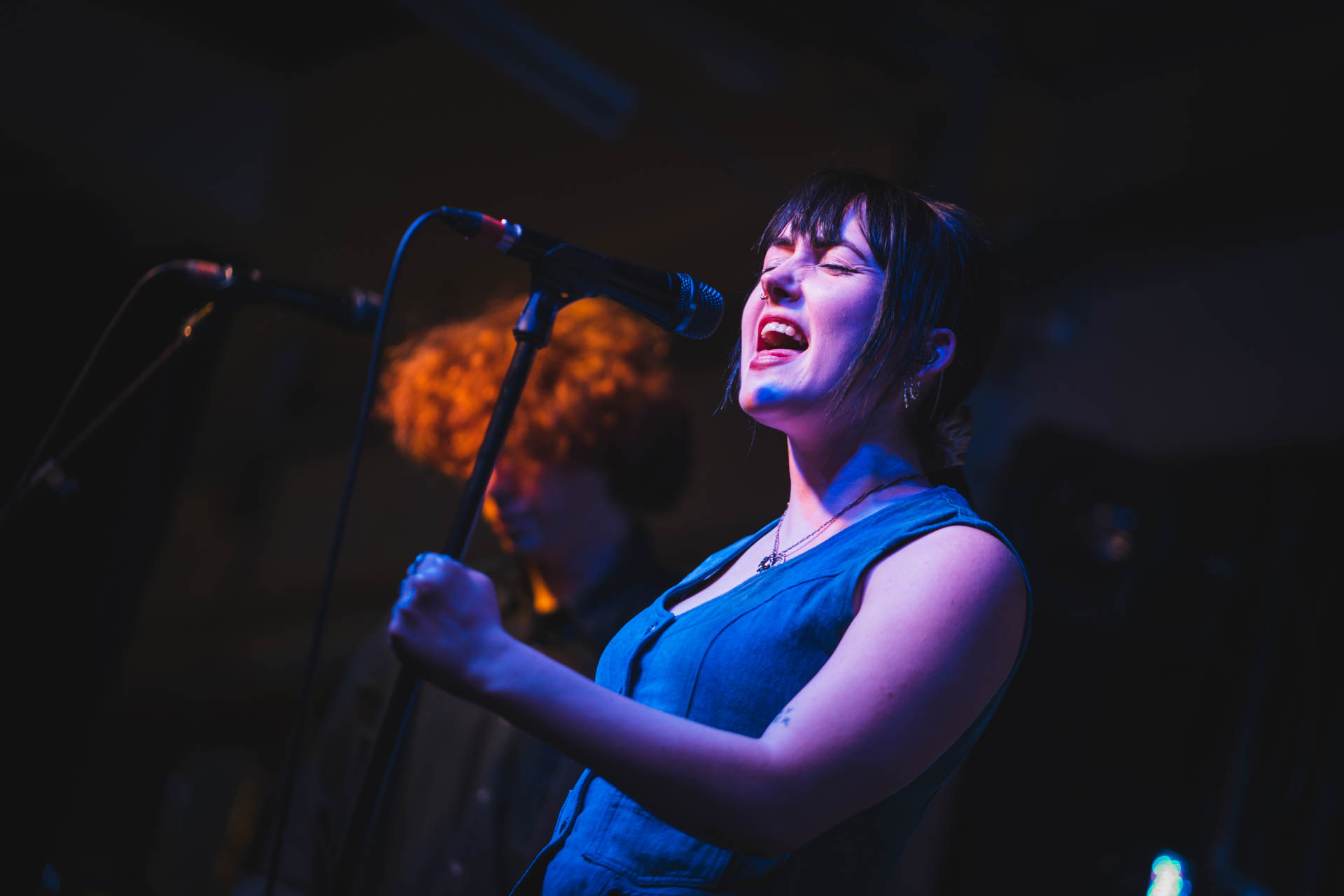
Just Mustard at Rough Trade in May 2022

=== Albums ===
- Wednesday (2018)
- Heart Under (2022)
- We Were Just Here (2025)

=== EPs ===
- Just Mustard (2016)
- Live Session (Park Time Punks KXLU) (2020)

=== Singles ===
- "Frank // October" (2019)
- "Seven" (2019)
- "I Am You" (2021)
- "Pollyanna" (2025)
- "We Were Just Here" (2025)
