= Lisbee Stainton =

- Born: Elisabeth Ruth Stainton; 1988 (age 37–38); Hampshire
- Origin: Basingstoke, Hampshire, England
- Genres: Folk, acoustic
- Occupation: Singer-songwriter
- Instruments: Vocals, guitar
- Years active: 2006–present
- Label: Marionet Music
- Website: lisbee.com

Lisbee Stainton (born 1988, Hampshire) is an English singer-songwriter with a folk acoustic style and known for her use of a distinctive eight-string guitar.

== Biography ==
Lisbee Stainton was raised in Hamble and Basingstoke. She started singing at age 5, and wrote her own songs from the age of 9. She launched her career by becoming the first unsigned singer-songwriter to play The O2 Arena (London) in 2007.

Her parents, being from Pontrilas in Herefordshire, led her to receiving her first airplay on BBC Hereford & Worcester including a BBC Introducing session at the Courtyard in Hereford. She was discovered by Tom Robinson when he heard her music on MySpace, and he invited her to play on his BBC Radio 2 and BBC 6 Music radio shows in April 2009. Subsequently, her singles "Red" and "Never Quite An Angel" were playlisted on Radio 2 for 5 and 6 weeks respectively, and "Just Like Me" was single of the week on the Radcliffe and Maconie Show.

Stainton toured with Joan Armatrading in April 2010. When BBC Radio 2 attended to record the headline act in Bristol they decided to record Stainton's set too, and aired this on the Radio 2 In Concert programme. She subsequently toured the United Kingdom in September and October 2010 followed by a European tour with concerts in Belgium, the Netherlands, Germany, Denmark and Norway.

She has since been a regular guest on Andrew Easton and Andrew Marston's BBC Hereford & Worcester radio shows.

In 2012, Seth Lakeman was so impressed with Lisbee that he subsequently invited her to become part of his band, singing and playing the banjo, harmonium, guitar and harmonica.

== Discography ==
=== Albums ===
Release date	Album
2006	Firefly
2009	Girl on an Unmade Bed
2012	Go
2013	Word Games
2017	Then Up
2018	Lisbee Live

=== Singles ===
Year	Song	Album
2006	"Beautiful Night/Wake Up"	Firefly
2008	"Red"	Firefly
2009	"Just Like Me"	Girl on an Unmade Bed
2010	"Never Quite An Angel"	Girl on an Unmade Bed
2010	"Is Whispering"	Girl on an Unmade Bed
2010	"Harriet"	Girl on an Unmade Bed
2011	"Wrench"	Go
2011	"It Must Be Love"	
2012	"Go"	Go
