= Arlo Parks discography =

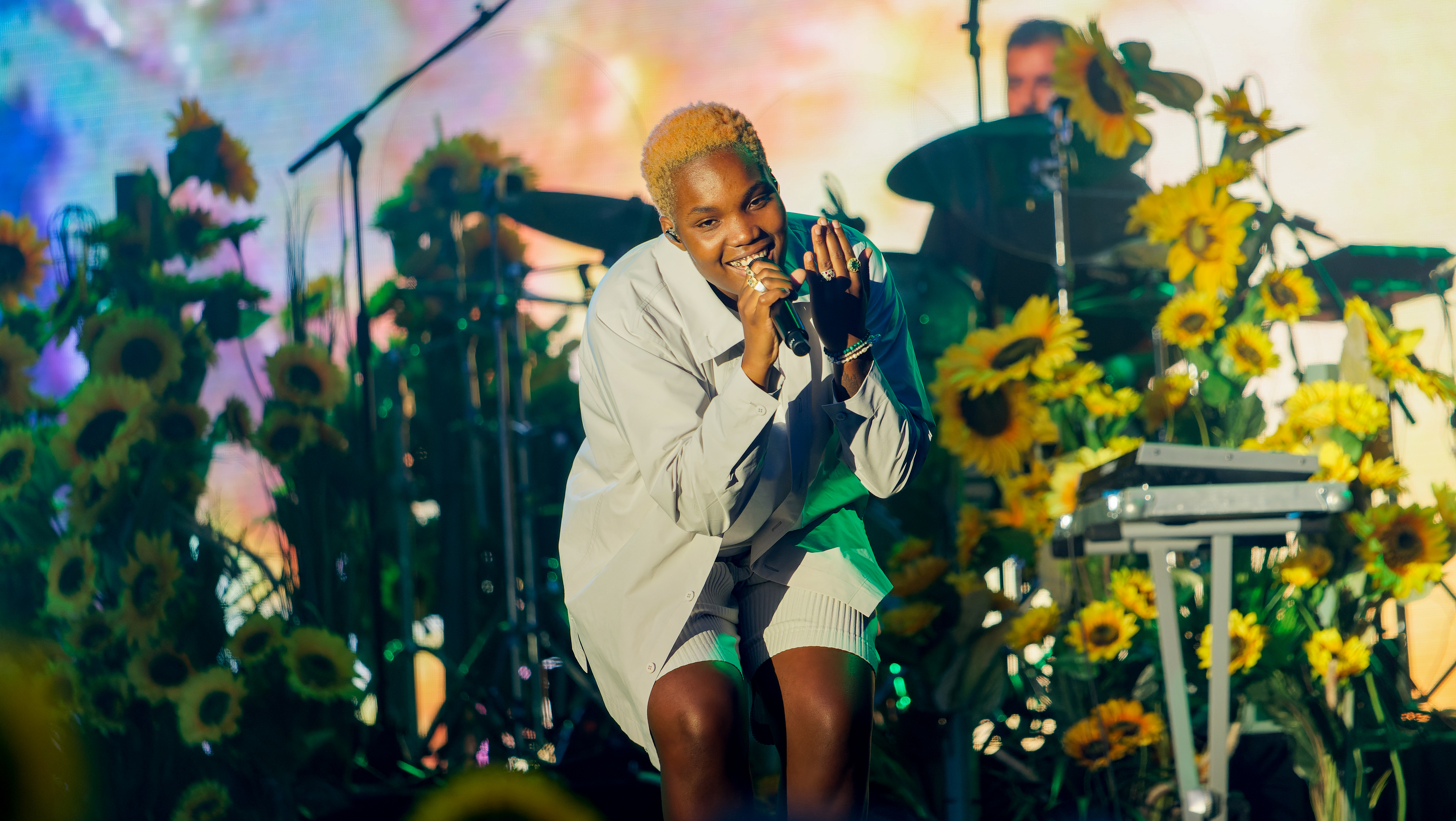
- Parks performing in 2022 at Somerset House
- Studio albums: 3
- EPs: 2
- Singles: 26
- Promotional singles: 1
- Music videos: 22

The discography of the English singer-songwriter Arlo Parks consists of three studio albums, two extended plays, 26 singles (including three as a featured artist), one promotional single, and 22 music videos.

== Studio albums ==
Title	Details	Peak chart positions										Certifications
Title	Details	UK	AUS	AUT	BEL (FL)	BEL (WA)	FRA	GER	IRE	NLD	SWI	Certifications
Collapsed in Sunbeams	Released: 29 January 2021; Label: Beatnik, Transgressive; Formats: CD, digital download, streaming, vinyl	3	18	6	6	66	84	10	27	47	7	BPI: Gold
My Soft Machine	Released: 26 May 2023; Label: Beatnik, Transgressive; Formats: CD, digital download, streaming, vinyl	9	68	—	46	167	180	23	—	— (Note: My Soft Machine did not enter the Dutch Album Top 100, but peaked at number 19 on the Dutch Vinyl 33 Chart.)	69	
Ambiguous Desire	Released: 3 April 2026; Label: Beatnik, Transgressive; Formats: CD, digital download, streaming, vinyl	13	—	—	127	67	161	43	—	—	50	
"—" denotes recording did not chart or was not released in that territory.

== Extended plays ==
Title	Details	Peak chart positions	
Title	Details	UK Indie	UK R&B /HH
Super Sad Generation	Released: 5 April 2019; Label: Beatnik, Transgressive; Formats: Digital download, streaming, vinyl	34	7
Sophie	Released: 29 November 2019; Label: Beatnik, Transgressive; Formats: Digital download, streaming, vinyl	—	—
"—" denotes recording did not chart or was not released in that territory.

== Singles ==
=== As lead artist ===
Title	Year	Peak chart positions										Certifications	Album/EP
Title	Year	UK Sales	UK Indie	BEL (FL) Tip	CAN Rock	ICE	JPN Over.	NZ Hot	SCO	SWI Air.	US AAA	Certifications	Album/EP
"Cola"	2018	— (Note: "Cola" did not enter the UK Singles Chart, but peaked at number 11 on the UK Physical Singles Sales Chart.)	—	— (Note: "Cola" did not enter the Ultratop Top 50, but spent 4 weeks as an extra tip on the Ultratop Bubbling Under chart.)	—	—	—	—	—	—	—		Super Sad Generation
"Super Sad Generation"	2019	— (Note: "Super Sad Generation" did not enter the UK Singles Chart, but peaked at number 12 on the UK Physical Singles Sales Chart.)	—	—	—	17	—	—	—	—	—		Super Sad Generation
"Romantic Garbage"	2019	—	—	—	—	—	—	—	—	—	—		Super Sad Generation
"George"	2019	—	—	—	—	—	—	—	—	—	—		Sophie
"Second Guessing"	2019	—	—	—	—	—	—	—	—	—	—		Sophie
"Sophie"	2019	—	—	—	—	—	—	—	—	—	—		Sophie
"Angel's Song"	2019	—	—	—	—	—	—	—	—	—	—		Sophie
"Eugene"	2020	—	—	— (Note: "Eugene" did not enter the Flemish Ultratop Top 50, but spent 4 weeks as an extra tip on the Flemish Ultratop Bubbling Under chart.)	—	—	—	—	—	—	—	BPI: Silver	Collapsed in Sunbeams
"Black Dog"	2020	64	— (Note: "Black Dog" did not enter the UK Independent Chart, but peaked at number 16 on the UK Independent Singles Breakers Chart.)	44	—	4	—	—	92	—	—		Collapsed in Sunbeams
"Hurt"	2020	—	—	44	—	38	—	—	—	—	13		Collapsed in Sunbeams
"Green Eyes" (featuring Clairo)	2020	—	—	45	—	2	—	—	—	77	—		Collapsed in Sunbeams
"Caroline"	2020	86	35	46	—	13	18	—	—	89	—		Collapsed in Sunbeams
"Hope"	2021	—	46	42	—	—	—	31	—	—	27		Collapsed in Sunbeams
"Too Good"	2021	—	—	—	48	—	—	—	—	—	—		Collapsed in Sunbeams
"Softly"	2022	—	—	—	—	16	—	—	—	—	27		Non-album single
"Weightless"	2023	—	—	—	—	—	13	—	—	—	11		My Soft Machine
"Impurities"	2023	—	—	—	—	—	—	—	—	—	—		My Soft Machine
"Blades"	2023	—	—	—	—	—	7	—	—	—	—		My Soft Machine
"Pegasus" (featuring Phoebe Bridgers)	2023	—	—	—	—	—	—	—	—	—	—		My Soft Machine
"Devotion"	2023	—	—	—	—	—	—	—	—	—	14		My Soft Machine
"2Sided"	2026	—	—	—	—	—	15	—	—	—	23		Ambiguous Desire
"Heaven"	2026	—	—	—	—	—	—	—	—	—	—		Ambiguous Desire
"Get Go"	2026	—	—	—	—	—	—	—	—	—	—		Ambiguous Desire
"Beams"	2026	—	—	—	—	—	—	—	—	—	35		Ambiguous Desire
"Senses" (featuring Sampha)	2026	—	—	—	—	—	—	—	—	—	—		Ambiguous Desire
"Floette" (featuring John Glacier)	2026	—	—	—	—	—	—	—	—	—	—		Ambiguous Desire
"—" denotes recording did not chart or was not released in that territory.

=== As featured artist ===
Title	Year	Peak chart positions	Album/EP
Title	Year	BEL (WA)	Album/EP
"Sangria" (Easy Life featuring Arlo Parks)	2020	—	Junk Food
"Sunrise" (Michelle featuring Arlo Parks)	2020	—	Non-album singles
"Tangerine" (Glass Animals featuring Arlo Parks)	2020	— (Note: "Tangerine" did not enter the Wallonia Ultratop Top 50, but spent 4 weeks as an extra tip on the Wallonia Ultratop Bubbling Under chart.)	Non-album singles
"—" denotes recording did not chart or was not released in that territory.

== Promotional singles ==
Title	Year	Album/EP
"Creep"	2020	Non-album single

== Guest appearances ==
Title	Year	Other artist(s)	Album
"What Matters Most?"	2020	Future Utopia	12 Questions
"Stranger in the Night"	2020	Future Utopia	12 Questions
"Quilt of Steam"	2023	Del Water Gap	I Miss You Already + I Haven't Left Yet
"Breathe"	2024	Khalid	Sincere

== Music videos ==
Title	Year	Director(s)	Ref.
"Cola"	2018	Ruby Brown and Leo Taylor	
"Super Sad Generation"	2019	Molly Burdett	
"George"	2019	Molly Burdett	
"Second Guessing"	2019	33bound	
"Sophie"	2019	Molly Burdett	
"Sangria" (with Easy Life)	2019	Greg Barth	
"Angel's Song"	2019	Ruby Brown	
"Eugene"	2020	The Coyle-Larner Brothers	
"Black Dog"	2020	Molly Burdett	
"Hurt"	2020	Molly Burdett	
"Green Eyes"	2020	Louis Bhose	
"Hope"	2021	Molly Burdett	
"Too Good"	2021	Bedroom	
"Softly"	2022	Zhang and Knight	
"Weightless"	2023	Marc Oller	
"Impurities"	2023	Jak Payne	
"Blades"	2023	Bedroom	
"Pegasus" (featuring Phoebe Bridgers)	2023	Bedroom	
"Devotion"	2023	Joel Barney and Ali Raymond	
"Purple Phase"	2023	Ameya	
"Jasmine"	2023	Joel Barney	
"2Sided"	2026	Molly Burdett	
