= Gianluca Buccellati =

American record executive (born 1990)

- Also known as: Luca, Bien et Toi, White China
- Born: Gianluca Buccellati; New York, US
- Occupations: Record producer, songwriter, musician
- Label: AMF

Gianluca Buccellati (born December 21, 1990), also known as Luca and Bien et Toi, is a Grammy-nominated and Mercury Prize winning American musician, record producer, songwriter, mixing engineer, audio engineer, and multi-instrumentalist. He has worked alongside artists including Lana Del Rey, Declan McKenna, Arlo Parks, Paris Texas, Tei Shi, Overcoats, Biig Piig, sophie meiers, The Marias, Cailin Russo and Hazel English. Buccellati largely wrote and produced Arlo Park's critically acclaimed debut album Collapsed in Sunbeams, which peaked at No. 3 on the UK Albums Chart, won the 2021 Mercury Prize and was nominated for Best Alternative Music Album at the 64th Annual Grammy Awards as well as for the Album of the Year at the 41st Brit Awards.

== Life and career ==
Buccellati, a native of Katonah, New York, now resides in Los Angeles. He is a member of the band White China.

In August 2021, Buccellati was nominated for an Ivor Novello Award for the Best Song Musically and Lyrically for his work on the song Black Dog. In September 2021, Buccellati won the Mercury Prize for his work on Arlo Park's Collapsed In Sunbeams album. In April 2022, Parks and Buccellati received a nomination for Best Alternative Music Album at the 64th Annual Grammy Awards for the album Collapsed in Sunbeams.

== Awards and nominations ==
Organization	Year	Category	Nominated work	Result	Ref
Grammy Awards	2022	Best Alternative Music Album	Collapsed In Sunbeams	Nominated	
Mercury Prize	2021	The Mercury Prize	Collapsed In Sunbeams	Won	
Ivor Novello Awards	2021	Best Song Musically and Lyrically	Black Dog	Nominated	
Brit Awards	2021	Album Of The Year	Collapsed In Sunbeams	Nominated	
MOBO Awards	2021	Album of the Year	Collapsed In Sunbeams	Won	
Libera Awards	2021	Best Pop Record	Collapsed In Sunbeams	Won	

== Discography ==
=== Producer and writer discography ===
Year	Artist	Song	Album	Label	Role
2024	Bien et Toi	Signs	London Safari II	Temple Records/AMF Records	Artist
2024	Bien et Toi	So Long (feat. Paris Texas)	London Safari II	Temple Records/AMF Records	Artist
2024	Bien et Toi	123 (feat. Lily Rayne)	London Safari II	Temple Records/AMF Records	Artist
2024	Bien et Toi	Right Here (feat. FJ Law)	London Safari II	Temple Records/AMF Records	Artist
2024	Bien et Toi	Reload (feat. Deyaz)	London Safari II	Temple Records/AMF Records	Artist
2023	Bien et Toi	Vous Venez Souvent Ici?	Voici	Temple Records/AMF	Artist/producer/writer
2023	Bien et Toi	Bounty	Voici	Temple Records/AMF	Artist/producer/writer
2023	Bien et Toi	Busy With It	Voici	Temple Records/AMF	Artist/producer/writer
2023	Bien et Toi	Jenny	Voici	Temple Records/AMF	Artist/producer/writer
2023	Bien et Toi	Haiku	Voici	Temple Records/AMF	Artist/producer/writer
2023	Bien et Toi	Time Glows	Voici	Temple Records/AMF	Artist/producer/writer
2023	sophie meiers	growing pains	spark__space	Epitaph Records	Producer/writer
2023	sophie meiers	fine	spark__space	Epitaph Records	Producer/writer
2023	Easy Life	ultimate_jutsu1644.wav	single	Island Records	Producer/writer
2023	Colouring	Lune	single	Bella Union	Producer/writer
2023	Declan McKenna	Sympathy	single	Sony Music	Producer/writer
2023	Declan McKenna	Nothing Works	single	Sony Music	Producer/writer
2023	White China	Like Flowers	single	Temple Records	Artist/producer/writer
2023	White China	Hex	single	Temple Records	Artist/producer/writer
2023	Declan Welsh & The Decadent West	Doing Great	single	Frictionless	Producer
2023	Paris Texas	tenTHIRTYseven	MID AIR	Self-release	Producer/writer
2023	Paris Texas	Full English feat. Teezo Touchdown	MID AIR	Self-release	Producer/writer
2023	Paris Texas	Bullet Man	MID AIR	Self-release	Producer/writer
2023	Paris Texas	Everybody's Safe Until...	MID AIR	Self-release	Producer/writer
2023	Declan Welsh & The Decadent West	First to Know	single	Frictionless	Producer
2023	Fake A Smile	Appetite	Shoot Me to the Moon	Temple Records/B3SCI	Producer/writer
2023	Fake A Smile	Shoot Me to the Moon	Shoot Me to the Moon	Temple Records/B3SCI	Producer/writer
2023	Fake A Smile	Prom Dress	Shoot Me to the Moon	Temple Records/B3SCI	Producer/writer
2023	Fake A Smile	Show Yourself Around	Shoot Me to the Moon	Temple Records/B3SCI	Producer/writer
2023	Fake A Smile	Don't Stop	Shoot Me to the Moon	Temple Records/B3SCI	Producer/writer
2023	Bien Et Toi, Rén with the Mane	We Coexist	The Smash Brothers (Original Soundtrack)	Rare Drop	Artist/producer/writer
2023	Paris Texas	Bullet Man	single	Self-release	Producer/writer
2023	Danielle Ponder	Roll The Credits	single	Future Classic	Producer/writer
2023	Eli Smart	Silence	single	Polydor Records	Producer/writer
2023	Soft Loft	Safe Space	In Case You Still Get Lonely	Self-release	Producer
2023	Soft Loft	Little Less	In Case You Still Get Lonely	Self-release	Producer
2023	Soft Loft	Is It Me	In Case You Still Get Lonely	Self-release	Producer
2023	Soft Loft	Bathroom Floor	In Case You Still Get Lonely	Self-release	Producer
2023	Soft Loft	Summer Sadness	In Case You Still Get Lonely	Self-release	Producer
2023	sophie meiers	okay w/ that	single	Epitaph Records	Producer/writer
2023	Declan Welsh & The Decadent West	I Don't Know Why	single	Frictionless	Producer
2023	Fake A Smile	Prom Dress	Prom Dress	Temple Records/B3SCI	Producer
2023	Declan Welsh & The Decadent West	Mercy	King Of My Head	Frictionless	Producer
King Of My Head	Declan Welsh & The Decadent West		King Of My Head	Frictionless	Producer
2022	Eli Smart	Baby Benzing	Aloha Soul 1	Polydor Records	Producer/writer
2022	Eli Smart	AM To PM	Aloha Soul 1	Polydor Records	Producer/writer
2022	Eli Smart	See Through	Aloha Soul 1	Polydor Records	Producer/writer
2022	Eli Smart	Cry At The Comedy	Aloha Soul 1	Polydor Records	Producer/writer
2022	Eli Smart	B Side	Aloha Soul 1	Polydor Records	Producer/writer
2022	carpetgarden	IDC	WTF is even going on?	House Anxiety	Producer/writer
2022	carpetgarden	da da song	WTF is even going on?	House Anxiety	Producer/writer
2022	Easy Life	Dear Miss Holloway feat. Kevin Abstract	Maybe In Another Life...	Island Records	Producer/writer
2022	Easy Life	Growing Pains	Maybe In Another Life...	Island Records	Producer/writer
2022	Easy Life	Memory Loss	Maybe In Another Life...	Island Records	Producer/writer
2022	Easy Life	Buggin'	Maybe In Another Life...	Island Records	Producer/writer
2022	Easy Life	Moral Support	Maybe In Another Life...	Island Records	Producer/writer
2022	Bien Et Toi	4AM feat. sophie meiers	London Safari	Future Classic	Artist/producer/writer
2022	Bien Et Toi	Rainbow Tables feat. Biig Piig	London Safari	Future Classic	Artist/producer/writer
2022	Bien Et Toi	Dream About You" feat. Halima	London Safari	Future Classic	Artist/producer/writer
2022	Bien Et Toi	Topo feat. sophie meiers & carpetgarden	London Safari	Future Classic	Artist/producer/writer
2022	Bien Et Toi	Flights	London Safari	Future Classic	Artist/producer/writer
2022	Sam Valdez	Charlie	single	B3SCI	Producer/writer
2022	Danielle Ponder	Only The Lonely	Some Of Us Are Brave	Future Classic	Producer/writer
2022	Danielle Ponder	Some Of Us Are Brave	Some Of Us Are Brave	Future Classic	
2022	Danielle Ponder	So Long	Some Of Us Are Brave	Future Classic	
2022	Sam Valdez	Unwind	Crush	B3SCI	Producer/writer
2022	sophie meiers	Untangle Me	single	Epitaph Records	Producer/writer
2022	NoSo	Parasites	Stay Proud Of Me	Partisan Records	Producer
2022	NoSo	Suburbia	Stay Proud Of Me	Partisan Records	Producer
2022	NoSo	David	Stay Proud Of Me	Partisan Records	Producer
2022	NoSo	I Feel You	Stay Proud Of Me	Partisan Records	Producer
2022	NoSo	I'm Embarrassed I Still Think Of You	Stay Proud Of Me	Partisan Records	Producer
2022	NoSo	Sorry I Laughed	Stay Proud Of Me	Partisan Records	Producer
2022	NoSo	Feeling Like A Woman Lately	Stay Proud Of Me	Partisan Records	Producer
2022	NoSo	Man Who Loves You	Stay Proud Of Me	Partisan Records	Producer
2022	NoSo	Everything I've Got	Stay Proud Of Me	Partisan Records	Producer
2022	NoSo	Honey Understand	Stay Proud Of Me	Partisan Records	Producer
2022	Sea Girls	"I Got You"	Homesick	Polydor Records	Writer
2022	Sophie Meiers	"let me breathe"	single	Epitaph Records	Producer/writer
2022	Jordan Whitlock	"Salty"	single	Self-release	Producer
2022	Sophie Meiers	"collar"	single	Epitaph Records	Producer/writer
2021	The Marias	DÁKITI - Spotify Singles	single	Nice Life Recordings / Atlantic Records	Additional production
2021	The Marias	Hush - Spotify Singles	single	Nice Life Recordings / Atlantic Records	Additional production
2021	carpetgarden	"IDC"	single	House Anxiety	Producer/writer
2021	modernlove.	I know it's tearing you apart	monochrome blue	Akira Records	Producer
2021	modernlove.	2 Missed Calls	monochrome blue	Akira Records	Producer
2021	Paraleven, Bien Et Toi	Falling In	Apollo	Rose Avenue Records	Writer
2021	Paraleven, Bien Et Toi	Crash And Burn	Apollo	Rose Avenue Records	Writer
2021	Paraleven, Bien Et Toi	Tidal Wave	Apollo	Rose Avenue Records	Writer
2021	AVIV	"love of your life"	single	Photo Finish Records	Producer
2021	NoSo	"Suburbia"	single	Partisan Records	Producer
2021	Terry Presume	Don't Wait Forever	What Box?	September Recordings	Producer/writer
2021	Terry Presume	Act Up	What Box?	September Recordings	Producer/writer
2021	Terry Presume	None Of This Alone	What Box?	September Recordings	Producer/writer
2021	Terry Presume	Personal	What Box?	September Recordings	Producer/writer
2021	Terry Presume	Zaza And Some Runtz	What Box?	September Recordings	Producer/writer
2021	Terry Presume	Swimming	What Box?	September Recordings	Producer/writer
2021	Colouring	What You Want	Wake	Self-release	Producer/writer
2021	Colouring	Dawn	Wake	Self-release	Producer/writer
2021	Biig Piig	Tarzan	The Sky Is Bleeding	RCA Records	Producer/writer
2021	Biig Piig	Baby Zombies	The Sky Is Bleeding	RCA Records	Producer/writer
2021	Biig Piig	Lavender	The Sky Is Bleeding	RCA Records	Producer/writer
2021	Biig Piig	Drugs	The Sky Is Bleeding	RCA Records	Producer/writer
2021	Easy Life	'have a great day'	Life's a Beach	Island Records	Producer/writer
2021	Arlo Parks	Hurt	Collapsed in Sunbeams	Transgressive Records	Producer/writer
2021	Arlo Parks	Black Dog	Collapsed in Sunbeams	Transgressive Records	Producer/writer
2021	Arlo Parks	Hope	Collapsed in Sunbeams	Transgressive Records	Producer/writer
2021	Arlo Parks	Caroline	Collapsed in Sunbeams	Transgressive Records	Producer/writer
2021	Arlo Parks	Green Eyes	Collapsed in Sunbeams	Transgressive Records	Producer/writer
2021	Arlo Parks	Just Go	Collapsed in Sunbeams	Transgressive Records	Producer/writer
2021	Arlo Parks	For Violet	Collapsed in Sunbeams	Transgressive Records	Producer/writer
2021	Arlo Parks	Eugene	Collapsed in Sunbeams	Transgressive Records	Producer/writer
2021	Rasharn Powell	The Heat	Dusk & Dawn	Self-released	Producer-writer
2021	Rasharn Powell	Blunder	Dusk & Dawn	Self-released	Producer-writer
2021	Rasharn Powell	Demons	Dusk & Dawn	Self-released	Producer-writer
2021	Rasharn Powell	Hiroshima	Dusk & Dawn	Self-released	Producer-writer
2021	Rasharn Powell	Terminal Talk	Dusk & Dawn	Self-released	Producer-writer
2021	Rasharn Powell	Twelvemonth	Dusk & Dawn	Self-released	Producer-writer
2021	Rasharn Powell	Smithereens	Dusk & Dawn	Self-released	Producer-writer
2021	Rasharn Powell	Joyride	Dusk & Dawn	Self-released	Producer-writer
2021	Rasharn Powell	Freedom	Dusk & Dawn	Self-released	Producer-writer
2021	Rasharn Powell	Warm In These Blue Jeans	Dusk & Dawn	Self-released	Producer-writer
2021	Rasharn Powell	Burning The Skies	Dusk & Dawn	Self-released	Producer-writer
2021	carpetgarden	Could You Love	The Way He Looks	House Anxiety	Producer/writer
2021	carpetgarden	Can Ghosts Be Gay	The Way He Looks	House Anxiety	Producer/writer
2021	carpetgarden	Don't Cry On My Doorstep	The Way He Looks	House Anxiety	Producer/writer
2021	carpetgarden	Westside	The Way He Looks	House Anxiety	Producer/writer
2021	carpetgarden	Beautiful Minds	The Way He Looks	House Anxiety	Producer/writer
2021	carpetgarden	Smoov	The Way He Looks	House Anxiety	Producer/writer
2020	Biig Piig	"Oh No"	Oh No / Liahr	RCA Records	Producer/writer
2020	Hazel English	Combat	Wake Up!	Polyvinyl Records	Writer
2020	Hazel English	Work It Out	Wake Up!	Polyvinyl Records	Writer
2020	Overcoats	The Fool	The Fight	Loma Vista Recordings	Writer
2020	Overcoats	Leave If You Wanna	The Fight	Loma Vista Recordings	Writer
2020	HMLTD	"The West Is Dead"	West Of Eden	Lucky Number Music	Producer/writer
2020	Tender	"Come Down When You're Ready"	single	Empty Glass	Producer/writer
2020	Wales	"Quiet"	single	Self-released	Producer/writer
2020	Aves, Lydmor	"Doubt"	single	Kieku Records	Producer
2020	Cailin Russo	"You Touch Me, I Touch You Back"	The Drama	Botticelli Music	Producer/writer
2020	White China	Beach Bum Palace	Vibes	Self-released	Producer/writer/artist
2020	White China	You Messed Up	Vibes	Self-released	Producer/writer/artist
2020	White China	When I Come Back	Vibes	Self-released	Producer/writer/artist
2020	White China	Fantasies	Vibes	Self-released	Producer/writer/artist
2020	White China	Temptation	Vibes	Self-released	Producer/writer/artist
2020	White China	Lipstick	Vibes	Self-released	Producer/writer/artist
2020	White China	Jerks	Vibes	Self-released	Producer/writer/artist
2020	White China	White Husk	Vibes	Self-released	Producer/writer/artist
2020	White China	Stop At Nothing	Vibes	Self-released	Producer/writer/artist
2020	White China	L35af	Vibes	Self-released	Producer/writer/artist
2020	Colouring	Fading	Singles	Self-released	Producer/writer
2020	Colouring	Ember	Singles	Self-released	Producer/writer
2020	Colouring	Beautiful Life	Singles	Self-released	Producer/writer
2020	Colouring	I Can't Make You Love me	Singles	Self-released	Producer/writer
2020	Tender	"6 In The Morning"	single	Empty Glass	Producer/writer
2019	Arlo Parks	"Sophie"	Sophie EP	Transgressive Records	Producer/writer
2019	Arlo Parks	Cola	Supersad Generation EP	Beatnik Creative	Producer/writer
2019	Arlo Parks	Supersad Generation	Supersad Generation EP	Beatnik Creative	Producer/writer
2019	Tender	Handmade Ego	Fear Of Falling Asleep	Partisan Records	Producer
2019	Tender	Bottled Up	Fear Of Falling Asleep	Partisan Records	Producer
2019	Tender	No Devotion	Fear Of Falling Asleep	Partisan Records	Producer
2019	Tender	Fear of Falling Asleep	Fear Of Falling Asleep	Partisan Records	Producer
2019	Tender	Tar	Fear Of Falling Asleep	Partisan Records	Producer
2019	Tender	Can't Show My Face	Fear Of Falling Asleep	Partisan Records	Producer
2019	Tender	When They Come For You	Fear Of Falling Asleep	Partisan Records	Producer
2019	Tender	Slow Love	Fear Of Falling Asleep	Partisan Records	Producer
2019	Tender	Closer Still	Fear Of Falling Asleep	Partisan Records	Producer
2019	Tender	Lower	Fear Of Falling Asleep	Partisan Records	Producer
2019	Tender	Tainted	Fear Of Falling Asleep	Partisan Records	Producer
2019	Tender	More Or Less	Fear Of Falling Asleep	Partisan Records	Producer
2019	Kwassa	"woozy"	fka kyko EP	Warner Records	Producer/writer
2019	Rasharn Powell	"Warm In These Blue Jeans"	single	Self-released	Producer/writer
2019	Aves, JFDR	"Gem Of The Ocean"	single	Kieku Records	Producer
2019	White China	Don't Say Anything	II	Beatnik Creative	Producer/writer/artist
2019	White China	Facade	II	Beatnik Creative	Producer/writer/artist
2019	White China	Change Your Mind	II	Beatnik Creative	Producer/writer/artist
2019	White China	West Side Love	II	Beatnik Creative	Producer/writer/artist
2019	White China	Bleed Me Dry	II	Beatnik Creative	Producer/writer/artist
2019	White China	Black Out	II	Beatnik Creative	Producer/writer/artist
2019	Kyle Lux	No Roof Access	No Roof Access	Self-released	Producer/writer
2019	Kyle Lux	Say It's Fine	No Roof Access	Self-released	Producer/writer
2019	Lana Del Rey	Lust for Life (featuring The Weeknd)	Lust For Life	Interscope Records	Additional production
2019	Lana Del Rey	Groupie Love (featuring ASAP Rocky)	Lust For Life	Interscope Records	Additional production
2019	Lana Del Rey	Tomorrow Never Came(featuring Sean Ono Lennon)	Lust For Life	Interscope Records	Additional production
2019	Lana Del Rey	13 Beaches	Lust For Life	Interscope Records	Additional production
2019	Lana Del Rey	Get Free	Lust For Life	Interscope Records	Additional production
2019	Cosima	"Who Do You Love"	Who Do You Love?!	South Of Heaven Records	Producer/writer
2018	Cailin Russo	"Bad Things" "Apeshit (Interlude)"	House with a Pool	Botticelli Music	Producer/writer
2018	AB001	"Beauty Sleep"	single	Self-released	Producer
2018	Colouring	bn	bn	Interscope Records	Producer
2018	Colouring	Hymn 21	bn	Interscope Records	Producer
2018	White China	Reputation	I	Garden Party	Producer/writer/artist
2018	White China	Shake	I	Garden Party	Producer/writer/artist
2018	White China	I Get Too High	I	Garden Party	Producer/writer/artist
2018	White China	Someone Like You	I	Garden Party	Producer/writer/artist
2018	White China	Freak Dreams	I	Garden Party	Producer/writer/artist
2018	White China	Overdrive	I	Garden Party	Producer/writer/artist
2018	White China	Follows You Around	I	Garden Party	Producer/writer/artist
2018	White China	Island In The Sun	I	Garden Party	Producer/writer/artist
2018	White China	Needless To Say	I	Garden Party	Producer/writer/artist
2018	White China	At Sunrise Sunset Blooms	I	Garden Party	Producer/writer/artist
2018	Wales	"Float"	Single	Self-released	Producer
2017	Luca, Tei Shi	"Best On"	single	Downtown Records / Interscope Records	Producer/writer/artist
2017	Tei Shi	Way To Record	Crawl Space	Downtown Records	Producer/writer
2017	Tei Shi	Keep Running	Crawl Space	Downtown Records	Producer/writer
2017	Tei Shi	Creep	Crawl Space	Downtown Records	Producer/writer
2017	Tei Shi	Baby	Crawl Space	Downtown Records	Producer/writer
2017	Tei Shi	How Far	Crawl Space	Downtown Records	Producer/writer
2017	Tei Shi	Bad Singer	Crawl Space	Downtown Records	Producer/writer
2017	Tei Shi	Say You Do	Crawl Space	Downtown Records	Producer/writer
2017	Tei Shi	Bay Girl	Crawl Space	Downtown Records	Producer/writer
2017	Tei Shi	Justify	Crawl Space	Downtown Records	Producer/writer
2017	Tei Shi	Lift Me	Crawl Space	Downtown Records	Producer/writer
2017	Tei Shi	Come Si	Crawl Space	Downtown Records	Producer/writer
2017	Tei Shi	Crawl	Crawl Space	Downtown Records	Producer/writer
2017	Tei Shi	Year 3K	Crawl Space	Downtown Records	Producer/writer
2017	Tei Shi	Your World	Crawl Space	Downtown Records	Producer/writer
2017	Tei Shi	Sleepy	Crawl Space	Downtown Records	Producer/writer
2016	Colouring	In Motion	Symmetry	Interscope Records	Producer/writer
2016	Colouring	About You	Symmetry	Interscope Records	Producer/writer
2015	Tei Shi	Can't Be Sure	Verde	Mom + Pop	Producer/writer
2015	Tei Shi	Bassically	Verde	Mom + Pop	Producer/writer
2015	Tei Shi	See Me	Verde	Mom + Pop	Producer/writer
2015	Tei Shi	Go Slow	Verde	Mom + Pop	Producer/writer
2015	Tei Shi	Get It	Verde	Mom + Pop	Producer/writer
2015	Wales	Falling	singles	Self- released	Producer/writer
2015	Wales	Lose My Mind	singles	Self- released	Producer/writer
2013	Tei Shi	Nevermind The End	Saudade EP	Self-released	Producer/writer
2013	Tei Shi	Adder(f)all	Saudade EP	Self-released	Producer/writer
2013	Tei Shi	M&Ms	Saudade EP	Self-released	Producer/writer
2013	Tei Shi	Nature vs Nurture	Saudade EP	Self-released	Producer/writer
