= Alessandro Buccellati =

Musician from the United States (b. 1998)

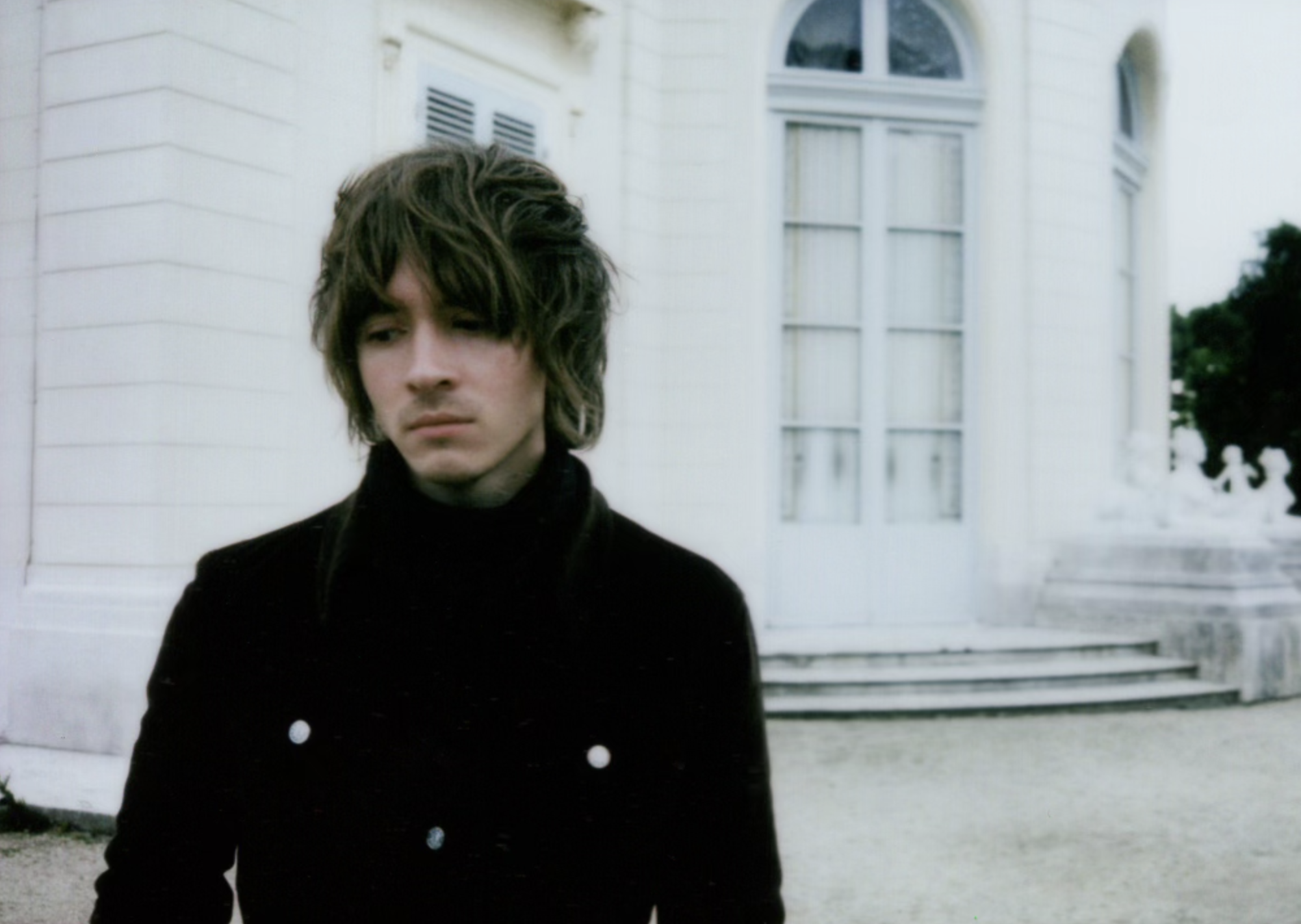
Buccellati in 2023

Alessandro Buccellati (born September 10, 1998) is a Grammy Award and Mercury Prize winning American musician, record producer, songwriter and multi-instrumentalist. He is the frontman of the band plus +.+ and has worked alongside artists including SZA, Pharrell Williams, Miguel, Mitski, DJ Dahi, Tamino, Guitarricadelafuente, Mike Sabath, Orion Sun, Arlo Parks, Dhruv, Sean Leon, Eddie Benjamin, Easy Life and Terry Presume.

== Life and career ==
Buccellati, a native of New York, now resides between Paris and Los Angeles.

In February 2024, Buccellati was nominated for a Grammy for Best Melodic Rap Performance for his work on SZA song 'Low' on the SOS album at the 66th Annual Grammy Awards. Time called "Low" a "strip club anthem". The album SOS won Best Progressive R&B Album and was nominated for Album of the Year.

Buccellati also contributed to Arlo Parks' album Collapsed In Sunbeams which in April 2022 received a nomination for Best Alternative Music Album at the 64th Annual Grammy Awards as well as in September 2021, won the Mercury Prize.

== Awards and nominations ==
Organization	Year	Category	Nominated work	Result	Ref
Grammy Awards	2024	Best Melodic Rap	Low	Nominated	
Grammy Awards	2024	Best Progressive R&B Album	SOS	Won	
Grammy Awards	2024	Album of the Year	SOS	Nominated	
Grammy Awards	2022	Best Alternative Music Album	Collapsed In Sunbeams	Nominated	
Mercury Prize	2021	The Mercury Prize	Collapsed In Sunbeams	Won	
Brit Awards	2021	Album Of The Year	Collapsed In Sunbeams	Nominated	

== Discography ==
Year	Artist	Song	Album	Label
2025	Mike Sabath	HIGH	DO YOU MIND/HIGH	Self released
2025	Guitarricadelafuente	Puerta Del Sol	Spanish Leather	Sony Music
2025	Ray Silvers	I Tried	I Tried	Manifest Music
2025	Wafia	Visions Of Love	Promised Land	Nettwerk
2025	plus +.+	(La)tter Sound	single	Independent Records
2025	plus +.+	How Cold The Flame	single	Independent Records
2025	Tamino, Mitski	Sanctuary	Every Dawn's a Mountain	Communion Records
2025	Tamino	Elegy	Every Dawn's a Mountain	Communion Records
2024	Dhruv	Ode To Boredom	Private Blizzard	Little Worry / RCA Records
2024	Dhruv	Grieving	Private Blizzard	Little Worry / RCA Records
2024	Orion Sun	Take My Eyes	Orion	Mom + Pop Music
2024	Orion Sun	Mary Jane	Orion	Mom + Pop Music
2024	Daniel Noah Miller	You Never Fight On My Time	Disintegration	Self released
2024	Ray Silvers	Palms	Palms	Self released
2023	Sean Leon	ALIVE	IN LOVING MEMORY	Self released
2023	Mike Sabath	Hers	Being Human	Warner Records
2023	Mike Sabath	Stranger	Being Human	Warner Records
2023	Mike Sabath	Would That Be Enough	Being Human	Warner Records
2023	Mike Sabath	Magic	Being Human	Warner Records
2023	Mike Sabath	I Know It's Real	Being Human	Warner Records
2023	Mike Sabath	Skins	Being Human	Warner Records
2023	Mike Sabath	Sexy!	Being Human	Warner Records
2023	Kyle Lux	Darth Vader	Cascade	AWAL
2023	Poolside	Ventura Highway Blues	Blame It All On Love	Ninja Tune
2023	Poolside	Hold Onto You	Blame It All On Love	Ninja Tune
2023	The Thing	Dixie Queen	Dixie Queen	Onion Records
2022	SZA	Low	SOS	TDE / RCA Records
2022	Easy Life, Kevin Abstract	Dear Miss Holloway	Maybe In Another Life	Island Records
2022	Easy Life	Growing Pains	Maybe In Another Life	Island Records
2022	Easy Life	Memory Loss	Maybe In Another Life	Island Records
2022	Easy Life	Moral Support	Maybe In Another Life	Island Records
2022	Easy Life	Buggin'	Maybe In Another Life	Island Records
2022	Grandma	I Bleed	Angelhood	Atlantic Records
2021	Arlo Parks	Green Eyes	Collapsed In Sunbeams	Transgressive Records
2021	Terry Presume	Don't Wait Forever	What Box?	September Records
2021	Terry Presume	Act Up	What Box?	September Records
2021	Terry Presume	ZaZa And Some Runtz (Smoke Break)	What Box?	September Records
2021	Terry Presume	Swimming	What Box?	September Records
2021	Terry Presume	Personal	What Box?	September Records
2021	Easy Life	have a great day	life's a beach	Island Records
2021	Eddie Benjamin	Emotional	Emotional	Epic Records
