= Butu =

2024 studio album by Kokoko!

Studio album by Kokoko!
- Released: 5 July 2024
- Length: 51:47
- Label: Transgressive
- Producer: Débruit (Xavier Thomas)

Kokoko! studio album chronology
Fongola (2019)	Butu (2024)

Butu (Lingala for "night") is the second studio album by Congolese experimental electronic pop musical group Kokoko!, released on 5 July 2024 through Transgressive Records. The album received positive reviews from critics.

== Critical reception ==
Professional ratings
Aggregate scores
Source	Rating
Metacritic	85/100
Review scores
Source	Rating
DIY	4/5 stars
The Line of Best Fit	7/10
Mojo	4/5 stars
PopMatters	9/10

Butu received a score of 85 out of 100 on review aggregator Metacritic based on five critics' reviews, which the website categorised as "universal acclaim". Mojo felt that "Kokoko! again deliver a banging, agitational rave-up that's impossible to stay a wallflower to". Brad Sked of DIY called it "a synth-driven assault on the senses" and concluded that "from its breakneck bonkers energy, to the more slowed-down moments, this is absolutely one for the ravers". Adriane Pontecorvo of PopMatters called Kokoko! "an already thrilling group entering a new and even more elevated creative state" on the album, who are "getting more interesting in their fusions of techno, tradition, and imaginative DIY techniques". Reviewing the album for The Line of Best Fit, Janne Oinonen wrote that "with the line-up reduced to the core duo of Bianko and Thomas due to the constraints and physical separation of covid, the hyperactive contents of Butu are more recognisable as electronic or even dance music".

== Track listing ==
Butu track listing
No.	Title	Length
1.	"Butu Ezo Ya"	4:05
2.	"Bazo Banga"	4:34
3.	"Donne Moi"	4:25
4.	"Motema Mabe"	4:25
5.	"Mokili"	4:17
6.	"Mokolo Likambu"	4:53
7.	"Kidoka"	3:47
8.	"Motoki"	4:42
9.	"Telema"	3:52
10.	"Nasali Nini"	3:20
11.	"Elingi Biso Te"	3:43
12.	"Salaka Bien"	5:44
Total length:		51:47
