= Fongola =

2019 debut album by Kokoko!

Studio album by Kokoko!
- Released: 5 July 2019
- Genre: Electronic pop
- Length: 43:45
- Label: Transgressive
- Producer: Débruit (Xavier Thomas)

Kokoko! studio album chronology
Fongola (2019)	Butu (2024)

Professional ratings
Review scores
Source	Rating
AllMusic	4.5/5 stars
DIY	4/5 stars
The Guardian	4/5 stars

Fongola is the debut album of Congolese experimental electronic pop musical group Kokoko!, released 5 July 2019 by Transgressive Records. The album is made with a combination of instruments made from junk and electronic instruments.

== Background ==
Kokoko! was formed in 2016 in Kinshasa, brought together by French musician Débruit (Xavier Thomas), their producer. Between 2016 and 2018, the group toured worldwide. In 2017, the group released their first single Tokoliana (the final track of Fongola), which brought them attention from major media publications such as Time. Kokoko! is known for their use of instruments made of junk, metal scrap, and wood, combined with electronic elements, to create their sound. Their lyrics are in Kikongo, French, Lingala, and Swahili.

== Music and composition ==
The sound of Fongola comes from Kokoko!'s combination of improvised instruments (including percussion instruments made from bottles and a three-stringed guitar) and Thomas's electronic synths. The group's singer was Makara Bianko, and the instruments were created by Dido Oweke, Boms Bomolo, and Love Lokombe. The album was recorded in makeshift studios. The group cites their influences in their music as the sounds of the city of Kinshasa. AllMusic describes their sound as a "fascinating mix of rugged lo-fi beats, relentless grooves, rousing vocal interplay, and kitchen-sink cacophony that sounds like nothing else being made in Africa or any other continent." DIY described the music as "punk disguised as dance".

When Kokoko! first announced Fongola, they released its third track, "Buka Dansa", to the public. On 2 July 2019, they released the tenth track, "Kitoko".

== Reception ==
The album released to rave reviews. Many reviewers took special notice to the sound of the second track, "Azo Toke". The album was included in NPR's list of the top 10 albums of July, and on Bandcamp Daily's list of "essential releases". London in Stereo described it as a "must have".

== Fongola Instrumentals ==
In 2021, Kokoko! announced Fongola Instrumentals, which was released on 5 February. For the release of the instrumental version of the album, the group built eight "playable sleeves".

== Track listing ==
Fongola track listing
No.	Title	Length
1.	"Likolo"	4:00
2.	"Azo Toke"	3:58
3.	"Buka Dansa"	4:21
4.	"Identité"	4:10
5.	"Malembe"	3:55
6.	"L.O.V.E."	2:56
7.	"Tongos'a"	3:48
8.	"Zala Mayele"	4:59
9.	"Singa"	3:06
10.	"Kitoko"	4:42
11.	"Tokoliana"	3:46
Total length:		43:45
