= Low (SZA song) =

2022 song by SZA

Song by SZA

from the album SOS
- Written: November 2022
- Released: December 9, 2022
- Recorded: November 2022
- Genre: Trap
- Length: 3:01
- Label: Top Dawg; RCA
- Songwriters: Solána Rowe; Rob Bisel; Alessandro Buccellati; Joseph Pincus; Jocelyn Donald; Rashad Johnson
- Producers: Bisel; Buccellati; Aire Atlantica

Lyric video
- "Low" on YouTube

"Low" is a song by American singer-songwriter SZA from her second album, SOS (2022). It was written alongside Jozzy and producers Rob Bisel, Aire Atlantica (Joseph Pincus), & Alessandro Buccellati, and features adlibs from fellow American singer and rapper Travis Scott. It charted in the United States, Canada, Australia, New Zealand, Ireland, and the United Kingdom, with a number 24 peak on the Billboard Global 200. The song received a nomination for the Grammy Award for Best Melodic Rap Performance at the 66th ceremony.

== Background ==
SZA released her debut studio album, Ctrl, in 2017. Primarily an R&B album that deals with themes like heartbreak, it received widespread acclaim for SZA's vocal performance, the musical style, and the songwriting. The album brought SZA to mainstream fame, and critics credit it with establishing her as a major figure in contemporary pop and R&B music and pushing the boundaries of R&B. (Note: Cited to multiple sources) Her next studio album was highly anticipated, and she alluded to its completion as early as August 2019, during an interview with DJ Kerwin Frost.

Commenting on the creative process behind the album, SZA stated it would be just as candid and personal as Ctrl: "This next album is even more of me being less afraid of who am I when I have no choice? When I'm not out trying to curate myself and contain." When SZA collaborated with Cosmopolitan for their February 2021 issue, she spoke about her creative process for the album: "this album is going to be the shit that made me feel something in my...here and in here", pointing to her heart and gut.

From April to May 2022, SZA told media outlets that she had recently finished the album in Hawaii and said it was her most relatable or "unisex" body of work as of then. During an interview with Complex, she described the album's composition: "I have no idea what it sounds like to anybody else. I really don't know. It's so bizarre. It's weird that I can't put my finger on it. It's a little bit of everything", and she added that certain tracks on the album had a soft or balladic sound.

During a Billboard cover story published in November, SZA revealed that the title of her second album was SOS, and it was scheduled for release sometime the following month. On December 3, 2022, she announced it would be released on December 9, and two days later, she posted the track list on Twitter. Out of 23 songs, "Low" appears as the album's fourth track.

== Music and production ==
"Low" was written and recorded around Thanksgiving 2022. The song was produced by Alessandro Buccellati, Rob Bisel and Aire Atlantica, who used AutoTune on SZA's vocals.

== Release and reception ==
The song reached the top 40 in Australia, Canada, New Zealand, and the United States, with chart peaks of number 34, number 21, number 36, and number 17, respectively. It peaked at number 6 on Billboard's Hot R&B/Hip-Hop Songs chart; out of 20 songs from SOS that debuted in the United States, "Low" was the fourth highest, behind "Kill Bill", "Nobody Gets Me", and "Blind". On February 7, 2023, it, along with three other songs from SOS, were certified gold by the Recording Industry Association of America for surpassing 500,000 units sold. On March 13, 2026, "Low" was certified triple platinum in the United States, denoting 3 million units sold.

Time called "Low" a "strip club anthem".

== Live performances ==
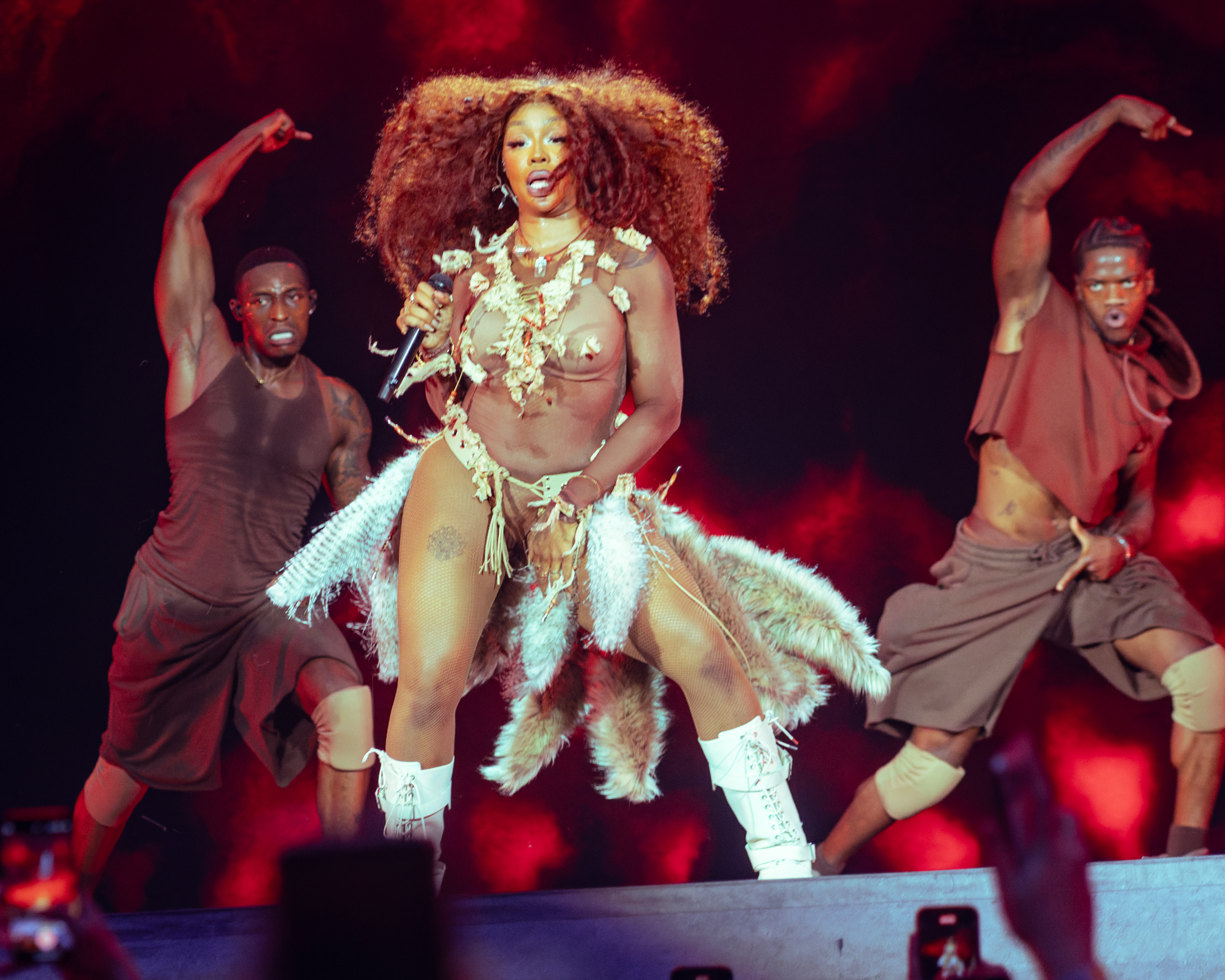
SZA performing "Low" on the Grand National Tour in London

SZA included "Low" on set lists of the SOS Tour. It was also part of her set for Glastonbury 2024, where was one of the headliners. In 2025, SZA embarked on the co-headlining Grand National Tour (2025) with rapper Kendrick Lamar, performing "Low" during the concerts' fourth act.

== Accolades ==
Table of awards and nominations received by "Low"
Year	Award	Category	Result	Ref.
2024	Grammy Awards	Best Melodic Rap Performance	Nominated	

== Credits ==
Credits are adapted from the liner notes of SOS.

Recording and management

- Engineered at Westlake Studio A (Los Angeles, California)
- Mixed at The Gift Shop (DTLA)
- Mastered at Becker Mastering (Pasadena, California)

Personnel

- Solána Rowe (SZA) – lead vocals, songwriting
- Rob Bisel – songwriting, production, keyboards, additional vocals, engineering
- Alessandro Buccellati – songwriting, production, keyboards, accordion, additional vocals
- Joseph Pincus (Aire Atlantica) – songwriting, production, drum programming
- Jocelyn A. Donald – songwriting
- Travis Scott (Note: Appears courtesy of Epic Records) – additional vocals
- Derek "206derek" Anderson – vocal engineering and mixing (for Scott)
- Robert N. Johnson – assistant engineering
- Jon Castelli – mixing
- Josh Deguzman – engineering (for mix)
- Dale Becker – mastering
- Katie Harvey – assistant mastering
- Noah McCorkle – assistant mastering

== Charts ==
=== Weekly charts ===
Weekly chart performance for "Low"
Chart (2022–2023)	Peak position
Australia (ARIA)	24
Canada Hot 100 (Billboard)	21
Global 200 (Billboard)	24
New Zealand (Recorded Music NZ)	36
UK Singles (OCC)	78
UK Hip Hop/R&B (OCC)	36
US Billboard Hot 100	17
US Hot R&B/Hip-Hop Songs (Billboard)	6

=== Year-end charts ===
Year-end chart performance for "Low"
Chart (2023)	Position
Canada (Canadian Hot 100)	93
US Hot R&B/Hip-Hop Songs (Billboard)	28
US Streaming Songs (Billboard)	66

== Certifications ==
Certifications for "Low"
Region	Certification	Certified units/sales
Australia (ARIA)	Gold	35,000^{‡}
Brazil (Pro-Música Brasil)	Platinum	40,000^{‡}
Canada (Music Canada)	3× Platinum	240,000^{‡}
New Zealand (RMNZ)	Platinum	30,000^{‡}
United Kingdom (BPI)	Gold	400,000^{‡}
United States (RIAA)	3× Platinum	3,000,000^{‡}
^{‡} Sales+streaming figures based on certification alone.
