= Eugene (song) =

Single by Arlo Parks

from the album Collapsed in Sunbeams
- Released: 11 February 2020
- Genre: Contemporary R&B
- Length: 3:41
- Label: Transgressive
- Songwriters: Anais Marinho; Gianluca Buccellati
- Producer: Gianluca Buccellati

Arlo Parks singles chronology
"Angel's Song" (2019)	"Eugene" (2020)	"Black Dog" (2020)

Music video
- "Eugene" on YouTube

"Eugene" is a song by the English singer-songwriter Arlo Parks, released on 11 February 2020 as the lead single from her debut studio album, Collapsed in Sunbeams (2021), alongside an accompanying music video. English music publication The Forty-Five ranked it as the fourth-best song of 2020.

"Eugene" was covered by Dua Lipa in 2021.

== Critical reception ==
English music publication The Forty-Five named it the fourth-best song of 2020.

== Music video ==
The music video, directed by the Coyle-Larner Brothers (consisting of English singer and rapper Loyle Carner and his brother Ryan Coyle-Larner), was released on 11 February 2020. It depicts two women—Parks and an unnamed acquaintance—whose relationship is unclear before the male titular character emerges and appears to be in a relationship with Parks' acquaintance, to Parks' chagrin.

== Certifications ==
Certifications for "Eugene"
Region	Certification	Certified units/sales
United Kingdom (BPI)	Silver	200,000^{‡}
^{‡} Sales+streaming figures based on certification alone.
