= Ambiguous Desire =

Studio album by Arlo Parks
- Released: 3 April 2026
- Length: 40:01
- Label: Transgressive
- Producers: Arlo Parks; Baird; Rob Bisel; Paul Epworth; Romil Hemnani; Dylan Neustadter; Buddy Ross; Andrew Sarlo

Arlo Parks chronology
My Soft Machine (2023)	Ambiguous Desire (2026)

Singles from Ambiguous Desire
- 1. "2Sided" Released: 13 January 2026; 2. "Heaven" Released: 2 February 2026; 3. "Get Go" Released: 10 March 2026; 4. "Beams" Released: 31 March 2026; 5. "Senses" Released: 22 May 2026; 6. "Floette" Released: 4 August 2026

Ambiguous Desire is the third studio album by the English singer-songwriter Arlo Parks. It was released on 3 April 2026 through Transgressive Records.

== Background and release ==
Ambiguous Desire was announced on 13 January 2026 along with the release of its lead single, "2Sided". The second single, "Heaven", was released on 2 February. The third single, "Get Go", was released on 10 March. The fourth single, "Beams", was released on 31 March. A remix of "Floette", featuring rapper John Glacier, was released on 4 August.

== Critical reception ==
Professional ratings
Aggregate scores
Source	Rating
AnyDecentMusic?	7.5/10
Metacritic	77/100
Review scores
Source	Rating
Clash	8/10
DIY	4.5/5 stars
Dork	4/5 stars
Exclaim!	8/10
Hot Press	9/10
The Independent	4/5 stars
Paste	B−
Pitchfork	7.1/10
Rolling Stone UK	4/5 stars
Under the Radar	7.5/10 stars

According to the review aggregator Metacritic, Ambiguous Desire received "generally favorable reviews" based on a weighted average score of 77 out of 100 from 14 critic scores. The review aggregator Any Decent Music gave the album a weighted average score of 7.5 out of 10 from 19 critic scores.

== Track listing ==
All lyrics are written by Arlo Parks, except "Get Go" (lyrics by Arlo Parks and Sampha Sisay); all music is composed by Arlo Parks, with additional composers noted.

Ambiguous Desire track listing
No.	Title	Music	Producer(s)	Length
1.	"Blue Disco"	Baird Acheson; Simon Martinez	Baird	3:00
2.	"Jetta"	Acheson; Martinez; Dylan Neustadter	Baird	2:48
3.	"Get Go"	Paul Epworth	Baird; Arlo Parks; Epworth	3:22
4.	"Senses" (featuring Sampha)	Acheson; Sampha Sisay	Baird	4:02
5.	"Heaven"	Acheson; Martinez	Baird	4:26
6.	"Beams"	Acheson; Andrew Sarlo	Baird; Sarlo	3:39
7.	"South Seconds"	Acheson	Baird	1:48
8.	"Nightswimming"	Epworth	Baird; Epworth	3:51
9.	"2Sided"	Acheson; Rob Bisel	Baird; Bisel	2:57
10.	"Luck of Life"	Acheson; Romil Hemnani	Baird; Parks; Epworth; Hemnani	3:34
11.	"What If I Say It?"	Epworth	Baird; Parks; Epworth; Hemnani	3:15
12.	"Floette"	Acheson; Neustadter; Buddy Ross	Baird; Neustadter; Ross	3:10
Total length:				40:01

== Personnel ==
Credits adapted from Tidal.

- Arlo Parks – lead vocals
- Garry Purohit – engineering
- David Wrench – mixing
- Simon Martinez – guitar (1, 2, 5)
- Dylan Neustadter – synthesizer (2)
- Ryan Raines – drums (3, 4, 12)
- Paul Epworth – guitar, synthesizer (3, 8, 11); drums (3, 8), bass guitar (3)
- Chiara Ferracuti – engineering (3, 8, 11)
- Luke Pickering – engineering (3, 8, 11)
- Walker Steele – engineering (9)
- Sampha Sisay – lead vocals (4)
- Brad Oberhofer – piano (6)

== Charts ==
Chart performance for Ambiguous Desire
Chart (2026)	Peak position
Belgian Albums (Ultratop Flanders)	127
Belgian Albums (Ultratop Wallonia)	67
French Albums (SNEP)	161
French Rock & Metal Albums (SNEP)	4
German Albums (Offizielle Top 100)	43
German Rock & Metal Albums (Offizielle Top 100)	11
Scottish Albums (Official Charts)	4
Swiss Albums (Schweizer Hitparade)	50
UK Albums (Official Charts)	13
UK Independent Albums (Official Charts)	1
