= Michelle (band) =

Indie-pop band from New York City

- Origin: New York City, New York, U.S.
- Genres: Indie-pop
- Years active: 2018-2025
- Labels: Atlantic Records; Transgressive Records
- Members: Sofia D'Angelo; Julian Kaufman; Charlie Kilgore; Layla Ku; Emma Lee; Jamee Lockard
- Website: www.wearemichelle.com

Michelle (stylized in all caps as MICHELLE) was a six-piece indie-pop collective based in New York City. The group consisted of Sofia D'Angelo, Julian Kaufman, Charlie Kilgore, Layla Ku, Emma Lee, and Jamee Lockard.

The group released three albums: Heatwave (2018), After Dinner We Talk Dreams (2022), and Songs About You Specifically (2024); and two EPs: GLOW EP (2024) and Kiss/Kill (2025).

== History ==
=== 2020–2022: Beginnings, HEATWAVE, and AFTER DINNER WE TALK DREAMS ===
Michelle was originally formed by producers Julian Kaufman and Charlie Kilgore with the plan to release one album dedicated to New York City. After the critical praise of their 2018 debut album HEATWAVE, completed before the members met in person, the group decided to keep on making music together.

In 2020, Michelle released two standalone singles, "SUNRISE" and "UNBOUND". "SUNRISE" came out on July 16, 2020. There were three alternate versions released in the subsequent months: a stripped version, one featuring Arlo Parks, and a remix by the booyah! kids featuring Deem Spencer. "UNBOUND" came out on October 5, 2020 which landed them on NME's 2021 Top 100 emerging artists list. Michelle released another standalone single, "FYO", on January 27, 2021. The group later released a remix with CHAI.

On September 14, 2021, Michelle released their new song, "SYNCOPATE", the first single off their second album. The next day, they announced the title and tracklist of their upcoming album, AFTER DINNER WE TALK DREAMS, set to release on January 28, 2022. The group released the album's second single, "MESS U MADE" on October 27, 2021. The third single, "EXPIRATION DATE" was released on January 5, 2022. Michelle released their fourth single from the album, "POSE", on February 28, 2022. Their second album, AFTER DINNER WE TALK DREAMS, came out on March 4, 2022. On October 18, 2022, Michelle released a new song, "PULSE".

=== 2023–2024: GLOW EP and Songs About You Specifically ===
In 2023, they released singles "THE PEACH", "GLOW", and "AGNOSTIC", the latter two announced as part of their upcoming GLOW EP. On January 11, 2024, their single "NEVER AGAIN" was released. GLOW EP was released on February 9, 2024.

On June 20, 2024, the group announced the upcoming release of their third album Songs About You Specifically. The lead single "Oontz" was released alongside the album announcement. Second single "Mentos and Coke" was released on July 31, followed by third single "Cathy" on August 29. The album was released on September 27.

=== 2025–: Kiss/Kill and indefinite hiatus ===
On August 5, 2025, Michelle announced that they had "decided to indefinitely take a break as MICHELLE". They also promised to release one final body of music. On September 26, they released Kiss/Kill, a six-track EP. On October 2, they played their final show at Webster Hall.

== Discography ==
=== Albums ===
Title	Album details
HEATWAVE	Released: September 4, 2018; Label: self-released; Format: LP, CD, digital download, streaming
AFTER DINNER WE TALK DREAMS	Released: March 4, 2022; Label: Atlantic Records, Transgressive Records; Format: LP, CD, cassette tape, digital download, streaming
Songs About You Specifically	Released: September 27, 2024; Label: Atlantic, Transgressive; Format: LP, CD, cassette tape, digital download, streaming

=== EPs ===
Title	EP details
GLOW EP	Released: February 9, 2024; Label: Atlantic Records, Transgressive Records; Format: Streaming
Kiss/Kill	Released: September 26, 2025; Label: Atlantic Records, Transgressive Records; Format: Streaming

=== Singles ===
Title	Year	Album/EP
"THE BOTTOM (Rosa let's Eat Grandma Rework)" (with Let's Eat Grandma)	2020	non-album single
"SUNRISE"	2020	SUNRISE
"SUNRISE - Stripped"	2020	SUNRISE
"SUNRISE - Leven Kali Remix" (with Leven Kali)	2020	SUNRISE
"SUNRISE (the booyah! kids Remix) - feat. Deem Spencer" (with Deem Spencer)	2020	SUNRISE
"SUNRISE (feat. Arlo Parks)" (with Arlo Parks)	2020	SUNRISE
"UNBOUND"	2020	UNBOUND
"UNBOUND - Austin Millz Remix" (with Austin Millz)	2020	UNBOUND
"UNBOUND - Stripped"	2020	UNBOUND
"FYO"	2021	non-album single
"FYO (feat. CHAI)" (with CHAI)	2021	non-album single
"FYO - Stripped"	2021	non-album single
"SYNCOPATE"	2021	AFTER DINNER WE TALK DREAMS
"MESS U MADE"	2021	AFTER DINNER WE TALK DREAMS
"EXPIRATION DATE"	2022	AFTER DINNER WE TALK DREAMS
"POSE"	2022	AFTER DINNER WE TALK DREAMS
"PULSE"	2022	non-album single
"GLOW"	2023	GLOW EP
"AGNOSTIC"	2023	GLOW EP
"NEVER AGAIN"	2024	GLOW EP
"Oontz"	2024	Songs About You Specifically
"Mentos and Coke"	2024	Songs About You Specifically
"Cathy"	2024	Songs About You Specifically
"Akira"	2024	Songs About You Specifically
