= My Soft Machine =

Studio album by Arlo Parks
- Released: 26 May 2023
- Length: 40:41
- Label: Transgressive
- Producer: Baird; Paul Epworth; Romil Hemnani; Al Hug; Anaïs Marinho; Ariel Rechtshaid; Buddy Ross

Arlo Parks chronology
Collapsed in Sunbeams (2021)	My Soft Machine (2023)	Ambiguous Desire (2026)

Singles from My Soft Machine
- 1. "Weightless" Released: 18 January 2023; 2. "Impurities" Released: 1 March 2023; 3. "Blades" Released: 19 April 2023; 4. "Pegasus" Released: 10 May 2023; 5. "Devotion" Released: 24 May 2023

My Soft Machine is the second studio album by British singer-songwriter Arlo Parks, released via Transgressive Records on 26 May 2023. It was preceded by the singles "Weightless", "Impurities" "Blades", and "Pegasus", a collaboration with Phoebe Bridgers. Parks toured throughout 2023 in support of the album.

== Background and recording ==
Parks described the album as a "deeply personal body of work" about "navigating life in her 20s", particularly "the mid-20s anxiety, the substance abuse of friends around [her], the viscera of being in love for the first time, navigating P.T.S.D. and grief and self-sabotage and joy". She also noted that it was "far more collaborative" than her first album, as she "worked with a lot of people in different parts of the world" and that it "felt like [she] was facing outwards a lot more". The album's sound was influenced by the bands My Bloody Valentine and Fontaines D.C., with Parks noting the latter's 2022 album Skinty Fia as having a significant impact upon its sound.

Parks began writing the album before releasing Collapsed in Sunbeams (2021), and it was recorded over 18 months in "sporadic bursts" between her touring commitments. She worked with various collaborators, including Paul Epworth, Ariel Rechtshaid, Buddy Ross and Romil Hemnani of Brockhampton. The title comes from a line in the 2019 drama film The Souvenir.

== Release ==
On 18 January 2023, Parks announced her second studio album, My Soft Machine, alongside the album's lead single "Weightless", alongside a music video. She also announced a European tour, beginning on 5 September 2023 in Dublin and ending on 21 September 2023 in Paris. Parks released the album's second single "Impurities" alongside a music video on 1 March 2023. The album's third single, "Blades", was released on 19 April 2023 alongside a music video. The album's fourth single, "Pegasus", featuring American singer Phoebe Bridgers was released on 10 May 2023, alongside a music video. Parks released the album's fifth single, "Devotion" on 24 May 2023 alongside a music video. On 26 September 2023, Parks released a music video for "Purple Phase" along with a North American My Soft Machine Tour. The tour begins on 29 February 2024 in San Diego and ends on 2 April 2024 in Brooklyn.

On 7 November 2023, Parks released the lead single for the deluxe edition of the album, "Jasmine", a cover of the Jai Paul song. Parks released the second single of the deluxe edition, a remix of "I'm Sorry" featuring Lous and the Yakuza on 6 December 2023. The deluxe edition of the album was released on 8 December 2023.

== Critical reception ==
Professional ratings
Aggregate scores
Source	Rating
AnyDecentMusic?	7.2/10
Metacritic	75/100
Review scores
Source	Rating
AllMusic	4/5 stars
The Arts Desk	3/5 stars
Dork	5/5 stars
Evening Standard	4/5 stars
Exclaim!	7/10
Gigwise	8/10 stars
musicOMH	4/5 stars
Pitchfork	6.9/10
PopMatters	6/10
The Skinny	4/5 stars

My Soft Machine received a score of 75 out of 100 at review aggregator Metacritic based on fifteen critics' reviews, indicating a "generally favorable" reception. In a five-star review, Jamie MacMillan of Dork called My Soft Machine "as close to perfection as it gets" and a "mark of how good this album is that it is hard to pick a standout moment", although highlighting "Pegasus" for being "an exquisite mash-up" of two artists and "Dog Rose" as it "soars into the heavens". Jamie MacMillan of Gigwise described the album as "soothing"—to "soothe your anxieties, soothe your heartache and soothe your grief. Parks is living these experiences and offering a warm cup of empathy to anyone going through similar", calling it "somehow all so uplifting". David Smyth of the Evening Standard remarked that "for the most part My Soft Machine sounds remarkably happy" and "summery and soothing", opining that Parks "pushes her sound in a few new directions with considerable success".

Cheri Amour of The Arts Desk commented that the tracks "Weightless" and "Impurities" have a "feeling of lessening and cleansing", as well as a "lounge-like quality", which continues "Pegasus". Amour also dubbed it "Peak Parks" and remarked "what a joy that is to have her back". Vijai Kumar Singh of Exclaim! wrote that the album "offers a peaceful and meditative reflection on a stagnant relationship and the journey to find wholeness", with the "latter half of the album continu[ing] to feature strong songwriting", calling "Pegasus" with Bridgers "arguably the best song on the album".

John Murphy of musicOMH summarised the album as a set of "low-key, introspective songs that would also sound perfect on a summer's day" with "some surprises to be had"—the spoken-word introduction "Bruiseless" and the "hard-rock guitar towards the end" of "Devotion". Murphy opined that while its lyrics "celebrate happiness and stability, there are some darker moments too", like the topic of addiction on "Purple Phase" and burnout on "I'm Sorry". Jack Faulds of The Skinny noted that there are "no overt leaps or shifts in the development of Parks' sound" from her debut. However, found there to be "unbridled confidence and general badassery" on the tracks "Weightless" and "Puppy" and "admirable gratitude for life in the face of some of its greatest challenges".

Laura Snapes, writing for Pitchfork, felt that the album's "sharp writing is often blunted by its temperate sound", as there are "adrenaline spikes of desire [that] are often muted by hazy, Vaseline-coated arrangements" and the "few deviations from the dreamy production are hit and miss". Reviewing the album for PopMatters, John Amen called the album "over reliant on predictable sonics and vague melodies" and lacking the "textures that informed Sunbeams' multifaceted aesthetic", concluding that it "unfolds respectably, proficiently, even likably, yet not particularly memorably".

In June 2023, Alternative Press published an unranked list of the top 25 albums of the year. It included the album, calling it "a bouncier, poppier take on [Parks's] award-winning poetic lyricism and intimate storytelling".

=== Year-end lists ===
Critics' rankings for My Soft Machine
Publication	Accolade	Rank	Ref.
AllMusic	Best Albums of 2023	—N/a	
Billboard	Best Albums of 2023	42	
Esquire	20 Best Albums of 2023	18	
Rolling Stone	The 100 Best Albums of 2023	100	
Under the Radar	Top 100 Albums of 2023	71	
Uproxx	The Best Albums of 2023	—N/a	

== Track listing ==
All lyrics are written by Anaïs Marinho.

My Soft Machine track listing
No.	Title	Music	Producer(s)	Length
1.	"Bruiseless"	Anaïs Marinho	Marinho	1:11
2.	"Impurities"	Marinho; Romil Hemnani; Al Hug; Carter Lang	Hug; Hemnani; Lang^{[a]}	3:49
3.	"Devotion"	Marinho; Baird; Paul Epworth; Hemnani	Baird; Hemnani; Epworth^{[a]}	2:45
4.	"Blades"	Marinho; Epworth	Epworth	3:41
5.	"Purple Phase"	Marinho; Epworth	Epworth	4:24
6.	"Weightless"	Marinho; Epworth	Epworth	4:02
7.	"Pegasus" (featuring Phoebe Bridgers)	Marinho; Baird; Epworth; Hemnani	Baird; Hemnani; Epworth^{[a]}	3:06
8.	"Dog Rose"	Marinho	Marinho; Baird; Epworth^{[a]}	3:08
9.	"Puppy"	Marinho; Ariel Rechtshaid; Buddy Ross	Rechtshaid; Ross	3:13
10.	"I'm Sorry"	Marinho; Rechtshaid; Ross	Rechtshaid; Ross	3:07
11.	"Room (Red Wings)"	Marinho; Dom Maker; Ross	Marinho; Ross	4:28
12.	"Ghost"	Marinho; Epworth	Marinho; Epworth^{[a]}	3:47
Total length:				40:41

Apple Music edition bonus tracks
No.	Title	Length
13.	"Mystery of Love"	3:39
14.	"Blades" (acoustic)	3:24
15.	"Dog Rose" (acoustic)	2:31
Total length:		50:15

Deluxe edition: disc two
No.	Title	Music	Producer(s)	Length
1.	"Jasmine"	Jai Paul	Dave Okumu	3:39
2.	"I'm Sorry" (featuring Lous and the Yakuza)	Marinho; Rechtshaid; Ross; Marie-Pierra Kakoma	Rechtshaid; Ross	3:07
3.	"Blades" (featuring Redveil)	Marinho; Epworth; Marcus Morton	Epworth	3:41
4.	"Devotion" (acoustic)	Marinho; Baird; Epworth; Hemnani	Marinho; Baird	2:41
5.	"Pegasus" (acoustic)	Marinho; Baird; Epworth; Hemnani	Marinho; Baird	3:00
6.	"Holding On"	Marinho	Epworth; Tirzah	2:48
Total length:				59:46

Note

- ^{^[a]} signifies an additional producer

== Charts ==
Chart performance for My Soft Machine
Chart (2023)	Peak position
Australian Albums (ARIA)	68
Belgian Albums (Ultratop Flanders)	46
Belgian Albums (Ultratop Wallonia)	167
French Albums (SNEP)	180
German Albums (Offizielle Top 100)	23
Scottish Albums (OCC)	5
Swiss Albums (Schweizer Hitparade)	69
UK Albums (OCC)	9
UK Independent Albums (OCC)	1
