= Softly (Arlo Parks song) =

2022 single by Arlo Parks

Single by Arlo Parks
- Released: February 1, 2022
- Genre: Contemporary R&B

Arlo Parks singles chronology
"Too Good" (2021)	"Softly" (2022)	"Weightless" (2023)

"Softly" is a song by Arlo Parks. It is her first single of 2022 and the first new music from Parks since the release of Collapsed in Sunbeams in January 2021.

Parks announced the single on social media on 28 January 2022, and it was released on 1 February. The music video for the song was directed by Zhang and Knight.

Describing the song, Parks stated "'Softly' is a song about yearning, about how fragile you feel in the dying days of a relationship when you’re still desperately in love".
