= Life's a Beach =

Studio album by Hard Life
- Released: 28 May 2021
- Genre: Alternative R&B; indie pop; hip-hop
- Length: 34:21
- Label: Island

Singles from Life's a Beach
- 1. "Daydreams" Released: 21 October 2020; 2. "A Message to Myself" Released: 23 March 2021; 3. "Skeletons" Released: 23 April 2021; 4. "Have a Great Day" Released: 12 May 2021; 5. "Ocean View" Released: 24 May 2021

Life's a Beach is the debut studio album by English alternative R&B band Easy Life (currently known as Hard Life), released on 28 May 2021 through Island Records. Life's a Beach was preceded by five singles: "Daydreams", "A Message to Myself", "Skeletons", "Have a Great Day", and "Ocean View".

"Skeletons" is included on the soundtrack of the EA Sports game FIFA 22.

== Critical reception ==
Professional ratings
Aggregate scores
Source	Rating
Metacritic	84/100
Review scores
Source	Rating
Clash	8/10
DIY	4/5 stars
NME	4/5 stars
The Line of Best Fit	8/10

Life's a Beach received critical acclaim. On Metacritic, which assigns a normalised score of 100 to ratings from publications, the album received a score of 84 based on four reviews, indicating "universal acclaim".

Clash writer Robin Murray felt that the album was "a record you're sure to fall hopelessly in love with, its immediacy taps into the endless zen of those long summer days."

Writing for DIY, Will Richards noted that "Life's A Beach's lasting impact is its confrontation of depression and self-doubt: this is a record that will make you feel deeply as well as provide a soundtrack for your first post-lockdown festival".

== Track listing ==
Life's a Beach track listing
No.	Title	Writer(s)	Producer(s)	Length
1.	"A Message to Myself"	Murray Matravers; Daniel Tannenbaum; Andrei Tiberiu; Craig Balmoris; Daniel Krieger; Serban Cazan; Sergiu Gherman; Tyler Mehlenbacher	Bekon; The Donuts; Matravers	2:08
2.	"Have a Great Day"	M. Matravers; Alessandro Buccellati; Gianluca Buccellati; Rob Milton	A. Buccellati; G. Buccellati; Milton	3:22
3.	"Ocean View"	M. Matravers; Barbara Kessler; Emilia Antoniades; Nicole Lucca; Noah McGuire; Milton	Milton	2:54
4.	"Skeletons"	M. Matravers; Milton; Sam Hewitt	Milton	2:58
5.	"Daydreams"	M. Matravers; Milton; Aretha Franklin; Ollie Slaney	Milton; Fraser T. Smith	2:35
6.	"Life's a Beach" (Interlude)	M. Matravers; Milton; Joel Little	Flange Jr.	0:33
7.	"Living Strange"	M. Matravers; Ben Matravers	B. Matravers; Milton; Flange Jr.	2:31
8.	"Compliments"	M. Matravers; Milton	Milton	3:26
9.	"Lifeboat"	M. Matravers; Cass Lowe	Lowe; Flange Jr.	2:28
10.	"Nightmares"	M. Matravers; Milton	Milton; Smith	3:27
11.	"Homesickness"	M. Matravers; Milton	Milton	3:33
12.	"Music to Walk Home To"	M. Matravers; Smith	Smith; Flange Jr.	4:20
Total length:				34:21

== Personnel ==
Easy Life

- Murray Matravers – vocals, synthesiser, keyboard, trumpet
- Oliver Cassidy – drums, percussion
- Sam Hewitt – bass guitar, saxophone, vocals
- Lewis Alexander Berry – guitar
- Jordan Birtles – percussion, keyboard, vocals

== Charts ==
Chart performance for Life's a Beach
Chart (2021)	Peak position
Irish Albums (OCC)	47
Scottish Albums (OCC)	4
UK Albums (OCC)	2

== Certifications ==
Certifications for Life's a Beach
Region	Certification	Certified units/sales
United Kingdom (BPI)	Silver	60,000^{‡}
^{‡} Sales+streaming figures based on certification alone.
