= Kokoko! =

Congolese experimental music group

- Origin: Kinshasa, Democratic Republic of the Congo
- Genres: Experimental music; electronic pop
- Years active: 2016–present
- Labels: Transgressive, ICI
- Members: Débruit (production, synthesizer, vocals); Dido Oweke (guitar); Boms Bomolo (bass, vocals); Love Lokombe (percussion, vocals); Makara Bianko (percussion, vocals)
- Website: https://www.kokokomusic.com/

Kokoko! is an experimental electronic music collective based in Kinshasa, Democratic Republic of the Congo. Their sound is created through homemade, unconventional instruments made from scrap, and their lyrics focus on political problems within the country. The group performs in a variety of different languages, including Kikongo, French, Lingala, and Swahili.

== History ==
The group started in 2016, choosing the name Kokoko! as it is an onomatopoeia in the Lingala language to signify knocking on doors. The group was brought together by Débruit (Xavier Thomas), their producer, who met the other members of the group at a party in Ngwaka, Kinshasa. The group chose to use experimental, homemade instruments due to the high price of traditional instruments in Kinshasa and the lack of ways to create electronic music. Kokoko! chooses to use instruments made out of unconventional junk and scrap. The lyrics of their music are allegorical, with references to the political situation of the Democratic Republic of the Congo. KOKOKO!'s sound has been compared to Grace Jones, Talking Heads, and the Orchestre Symphonique Kimbanguiste. Member Makara Bianko describes the music using the phrase tekno kintueni.

In 2017, the group released their first single, "Tokoliana". In late 2017, the group released "Tongo'sa" / "Likolo". In 2019, they released the single "Azo Toke" in the run-up to the release of their debut studio album, Fongola. They released Fongola on 5 July 2019 with Transgressive Records, which received rave reviews.

== Discography ==
=== Albums ===
- Fongola (2019, Transgressive)
- Fongola (Instrumentals) (2021, Transgressive)
- Butu (2024, Transgressive)

=== Singles/EPs ===
- "Tongos'a" / "Likolo" (2017, ICI)
- "Tokoliana" / "L.O.V.E." (2017, ICI)
- "Liboso" (2018, Transgressive)
- "Remixes" (2018, ICI)
- "Malembe" (2019, Transgressive)
- "Kitoko" (2019, Transgressive)
- "Buka Dansa" (2019, Transgressive)
