= Black Dog (Arlo Parks song) =

2020 single by Arlo Parks

Single by Arlo Parks

from the album Collapsed in Sunbeams
- A-side: "Eugene"
- Released: May 4, 2020
- Genre: Contemporary R&B
- Length: 3:45
- Label: Transgressive
- Songwriters: Anais Marinho; Gianluca Buccellati
- Producer: Gianluca Buccellati

Arlo Parks singles chronology
| "Eugene" (2020) | "Black Dog" (2020) | "Hurt" (2020) |

Music video
- "Black Dog" on YouTube

"Black Dog" is a song by the British singer and poet Arlo Parks from her first studio album, Collapsed in Sunbeams (2021). Named after Winston Churchill's term for depression, the song focuses on mental health. "Black Dog" was Parks' first song to have mainstream radio airplay in the UK, on the A List of the BBC Radio 1 Playlist in July 2020. Critics at NME ranked "Black Dog" as the fourth best song of 2020.

== Background and release ==
The song was released a month before Parks became an ambassador for the British mental health charity, Campaign Against Living Miserably. It was released as a double-sided single with the song "Eugene" on 4 May 2020. Both songs were produced by Gianluca Buccellati, who also wrote them with Parks. Referring to "Black Dog", Parks said, "It's supposed to make people who are struggling feel less isolated and start a conversation surrounding the prevalence of mental health issues in today's world."

== Critical reception ==
The song was placed on Amazon Music's UK Rising playlist within a week of its initial release. NME described the single as "the years most devastating song". DIY explained the song as being directed at those having to deal with mental health issues. Narzra Ahmed of When The Horn Blows revealed that the meaning of "Black Dog" is a metaphor for depression with the song intended for people suffering with mental health as a result of isolation, and encourages a conversation around the issue. Malvika Padin of Euphoria describes the song as starting a conversation around how people feel about themselves especially with the advent of social media making people question if they are a perfect person and their life. "Black Dog" was also reported on by Redbrick and Office magazines, both of which described the song as one that explores human relationships.

== Music video ==
In May 2020, a music video directed by Molly Burdett was released. The 4K video has scenes depicting depression, sadness and family issues.

== Track listing ==
| No. | Title | Writer(s) | Producer | Length |
|---|---|---|---|---|
| 1. | "Black Dog" | Anais Marinho; Gianluca Buccellati | Buccellati | 3:45 |
| 2. | "Eugene" | Marinho; Buccellati | Buccellati | 3:42 |
| Total length: | | | | 7:27 |

== Charts ==
| Chart (2020) | Peak position |
|---|---|
| Belgium (Ultratip Bubbling Under Flanders) | 44 |
| Belgium Urban (Ultratop Flanders) | 32 |
| UK Singles Downloads (OCC) | 61 |
| Scotland Singles (OCC) | 92 |
