= Caroline (Arlo Parks song) =

2020 single by Arlo Parks

Single by Arlo Parks

from the album Collapsed in Sunbeams
- Released: November 23, 2020
- Genre: Contemporary R&B
- Label: Transgressive

Arlo Parks singles chronology
"Green Eyes" (2020)	"Caroline" (2020)	"Hope" (2021)

Music video
- "Caroline" on YouTube

"Caroline" is a song by British singer Arlo Parks. It was the fifth single to be released from her debut album Collapsed in Sunbeams (2021).

== Background ==
Caroline debuted to streaming platforms on 23 November 2020, the same day it premiered as Annie Mac's Hottest Record in the World on BBC Radio 1. Describing the song, Parks said "’Caroline’ is an exercise in people watching and seeing situations unfold without context, It’s an exploration of how something once full of healthy passion can dissolve in an instant." The song describes a fallout between a couple from the perspective of an onlooker waiting for the bus.

== Music video ==
The music video was released in December 2020.

== Critical reception ==
Molly Rushton from Redbrick described Caroline as "melancholy" and stated that it "captures a tragic energy". Rushton called it "one of the best singles to have come from Parks yet". Robin Murray from Clash also praised the song.

== Charts ==
Chart (2020–2021)	Peak position
Belgium (Ultratip Bubbling Under Flanders)	46
Japan Hot Overseas (Billboard)	18
Switzerland Airplay (Schweizer Hitparade)	89
UK Singles Downloads (OCC)	84
UK Indie (OCC)	35
