= Mutual Benefit =

Mutual Benefit may refer to:

- Mutual Benefit Life Insurance Company, American insurance provider from 1845 to 2001
- Mutual Benefit Health and Accident Association, name from 1909 to 1950 of American insurance company Mutual of Omaha
- Mutual-benefit nonprofit corporation, American type of corporatation
- Mutual Benefit (band), American music project 2009 to present

== See also ==
- Mutual Benefits Corporation, American ponzi scheme operating 1994 to 2004
