= Tender (band) =

British electronic music duo

TENDER
- Origin: London, England
- Genres: Electronic, electropop, indie
- Years active: 2015–present
- Label: Partisan Records
- Members: James Cullen; Dan Cobb
- Website: https://www.tenderofficial.com/

Tender (styled as TENDER) is a British electronic music duo formed in London, England, in 2015. Having started from home and self releasing a couple of EPs, they signed to Partisan Records in 2016, and released their debut album, Modern Addiction, in September 2017. Their music has been featured in a number of television shows and movies, most notably the Netflix film To All the Boys I've Loved Before and television shows How To Get Away With Murder and Never Have I Ever.

The duo released their second studio album, Fear of Falling Asleep, on 18 January 2019.

== Discography ==
=== Albums ===
Title
Album details
Notes
Modern Addiction
- Released 1 September 2017
- Label: Partisan Records
- Formats: CD, digital download, vinyl

No.	Title	Length
1.	"Illuminate"	3:11
2.	"Nadir"	4:02
3.	"Hypnotised"	3:35
4.	"Crawl"	3:29
5.	"Erode"	4:10
6.	"Silence"	3:53
7.	"Machine"	2:50
8.	"Sickness"	3:36
9.	"Vow"	3:24
10.	"Blame"	4:19
11.	"Powder"	3:07
12.	"Trouble"	4:39

Fear of Falling Asleep
- Released 18 January 2019
- Label: Partisan Records
- Formats: CD, digital download, vinyl

No.	Title	Length
1.	"Handmade Ego"	5:10
2.	"Bottled Up"	4:47
3.	"No Devotion"	3:27
4.	"Fear of Falling Asleep"	4:11
5.	"Tar"	4:44
6.	"Can't Show My Face"	4:09
7.	"When They Come For You"	3:40
8.	"Slow Love"	4:12
9.	"Closer Still"	4:11
10.	"Lower"	3:59
11.	"Tainted"	4:00
12.	"More or Less"	3:20

=== Extended plays ===
Title	Album details	Notes
Armour EP	Released 13 September 2015; Label: Self-released; Formats: Digital download	No. / Title / Length; 1. / "Armour" / 4:10; 2. / "Melt" / 3:41; 3. / "Bleed" / 3:29; 4. / "Legion" / 3:21; 5. / "Belong" / 4:13
EP II	Released 12 February 2016; Label: Self-released; Formats: Digital download, vinyl	No. / Title / Length; 1. / "Lost" / 4:28; 2. / "Cut" / 3:39; 3. / "Afternoon" / 3:08; 4. / "Burden" / 3:21; 5. / "Volatile" / 4:02
EP III	Released 4 November 2016; Label: Partisan Records; Formats: CD, digital download, vinyl	No. / Title / Length; 1. / "Oracle" / 3:46; 2. / "Violence" / 2:41; 3. / "Design" / 3:04; 4. / "Smoke" / 3:30; 5. / "Outside" / 4:10
Side A	Released 4 December 2020	No. / Title / Length; 1. / "6 in the Morning" / 4:18; 2. / "Living" / 3:57; 3. / "Come Down When You’re Ready" / 4:11; 4. / "Own Up" / 3:41; 5. / "What You’re Missing" / 4:28
Side B	Released 6 May 2022	No. / Title / Length; 1. / "Touch" / 3:57; 2. / "Long Time Coming" / 3:18; 3. / "Rein You In" / 3:40; 4. / "Control" / 4:03; 5. / "Good For Something" / 3:55

== Band members ==
- James Cullen – lead vocals, keyboard, synths (2015–present)
- Dan Cobb – backing vocals, keyboard, synths, guitar (2015–present)
