= Collapsed in Sunbeams =

2021 studio album by Arlo Parks

Studio album by Arlo Parks
- Released: 29 January 2021
- Length: 40:00
- Label: Transgressive
- Producers: Gianluca Buccellati, Alessandro Buccellati, Paul Epworth, Bad Sounds

Arlo Parks chronology
Sophie (2019)	Collapsed in Sunbeams (2021)	My Soft Machine (2023)

Singles from Collapsed in Sunbeams
- 1. "Eugene" Released: 11 February 2020; 2. "Black Dog" Released: 4 May 2020; 3. "Hurt" Released: 18 August 2020; 4. "Green Eyes" Released: 20 October 2020; 5. "Caroline" Released: 23 November 2020; 6. "Hope" Released: 27 January 2021; 7. "Too Good" Released: 28 July 2021

Collapsed in Sunbeams is the debut studio album by British singer-songwriter Arlo Parks, released via Transgressive Records on 29 January 2021. The album received widespread acclaim, with many music critics praising Parks' versatility and vulnerability. The record was supported by seven singles including "Black Dog" and "Hurt". The album won the 2021 Mercury Prize, and was nominated for Best Alternative Music Album at the 64th Annual Grammy Awards.

== Background and recording ==
Prior to the release of Collapsed in Sunbeams, Parks had recorded and independently released two extended plays, namely Super Sad Generation (2019) and Sophie (2019), since her solo debut in 2018 with the song "Cola". In early October 2020, Parks revealed via social media that she had finished recording "the album". She had prior told NME in July 2020 that she had been "doing a lot of writing" and thinking about exactly what she wanted to express in her "first big cohesive statement of intent".

Parks told NME in October 2020 that the album is "a series of vignettes and intimate portraits surrounding [her] adolescence and the people that shaped it. It is rooted in storytelling and nostalgia – I want it to feel both universal and hyper specific." Speaking to Billboard, she said that while recording during the COVID-19 pandemic she was "mining these deep-rooted, sometimes traumatic places [at a time] when the world was crumbling around [her]."

Parks and Los Angeles-based songwriter and record producer Gianluca Buccellati co-wrote every song on the record, with the latter producing all its music. They both work in various Airbnb apartments as they have "neutral energy" and "blank spaces where [the duo] can forge their own creative bubble." The track "Green Eyes" features uncredited work from American singer-songwriter Clairo who provides both guitar and background vocals.

== Release and promotion ==
=== Singles ===
On 11 February 2020, the first single from the album, "Eugene", was released alongside an accompanying music video directed by hip-hop artist Loyle Carner. The album's second single, "Black Dog", was released on 4 May 2020 with an accompanying music video and became the most successful single from the album. It made the A List on BBC Radio 1 and reached number 65 on the UK Singles Downloads Chart in July 2020. It also received critical acclaim, with NME calling it both "the year’s most devastating song" and the fourth best song of 2020 overall. The third single from the album, "Hurt", was released on 18 August 2020, with an accompanying music video being released a day later. The fourth single, "Green Eyes" was released alongside the album's announcement on 20 October 2020. "Caroline" was released as the album's fifth single on 24 November 2020, with an accompanying video being released on 15 December 2020. The song gained traction in Japan number 20 on Billboard Japan's Hot Overseas chart. It was also later serviced to A List on BBC Radio 1 on 21 January 2021. On the same day, Parks presented a preview of the album on a livestream hosted by Rough Trade and broadcast exclusively on the Dice official website. "Hope" was released alongside and accompanying music video as the album's sixth single on 27 January 2021. Parks later engaged in a listening party hosted by Raina Douris on NPR on the day of the album's release.

=== Live performances ===
In 2020, Parks performed various singles from the album for many different festivals and shows, many of which were held virtually due to the COVID-19 pandemic. She performed the song "Eugene" for the annual British Music Embassy Sessions, which were previously hosted by South by Southwest, but in March 2020 were hosted by BBC Music Introducing and a number of their industry partners. Parks performed a stripped back version of her song "Black Dog" for the 2020 Glastonbury Festival, which was held virtually. In August 2020, she performed A Colors Show of the song "Hurt" for ColorsxStudios. Apart from performing a cover of Billie Eilish's single "My Future", Parks performed "Hurt" on BBC's Live Lounge in September 2020. In that same month, she performed the singles "Hurt", "Cola", "Eugene", "Black Dog" for NPR's Tiny Desk Concerts. In October 2020, Parks would also do a virtual performance of the song "Green Eyes" at BBC Radio Theatre for the virtual BBC Music Introducing Live festival. A month earlier, she performed the song "Black Dog" for BBC Radio 6 Music at the same theatre to celebrate what was named their State of Independents Day. She again performed the same song a few days later at the virtual ceremony for the 2020 AIM Independent Music Awards. In October 2020, Parks performed "Hurt" for a Channel 4 television special titled The Whole Truth in which she and other Black British musicians explored mental health. In November 2020, she performed the same song for American radio station KXT 91.7 and NPR's Live Sessions. She performed it once again at the New Year's Eve 2020/21 Special of British television series Top of the Pops. Parks made her television debut in the United States performing "Hurt" on Jimmy Kimmel Live! in January 2021. She also performed "Caroline" on The Graham Norton Show in February 2021.

== Composition ==
In January 2021, Marissa Lorusso from American radio program Morning Edition summarised and described the preceding singles' sound as "kind of like bedroom pop mixed with a little bit of indie folk and a little bit of R&B."

== Critical reception ==
Professional ratings
Aggregate scores
Source	Rating
AnyDecentMusic?	7.9/10
Metacritic	83/100
Review scores
Source	Rating
Clash	8/10
Dork	5/5 stars
Gigwise	9/10 stars
The Guardian	4/5 stars
The Independent	4/5 stars
The Irish Times	4/5 stars
The Line of Best Fit	9/10
musicOMH	4/5 stars
NME	5/5 stars
Pitchfork	6.7/10

Collapsed in Sunbeams received widespread acclaim, with many critics praising Parks' versatility and vulnerability. Aggregating website Metacritic reports a normalised rating of 83 based on 20 critical reviews, indicating "universal acclaim". NME notably lauded the record with 5 out of 5 stars and described it as "a universal collection of stories that'll provide solace for listeners of all ages and backgrounds for decades to come." Dork also gave it 5 out of 5 stars and deemed it "a sublime body of work from the kind of artist who is meticulous in all aspects of her craft".

Before its release, Bella Taliesen of The Face described the album as "breathtaking", "dreamlike, jazzy and at times properly poppy" and noted that it would "take this bedroom star stratospheric." Alexis Petridis of The Guardian described Collapsed in Sunbeams as "a diaristic, near-perfect debut" that "feels like a warm breeze in the depths of a miserable winter." Writing for Clash, Tochi Imo described the record as "reflective, intuitive and introspective" and "an immensely gripping debut", while noting that despite featuring no guest appearances, Parks "holds her own across all 12 singles and sets the bar high for those who follow." In a very positive review for The Irish Times, Lauren Murphy described the album as "a seriously refreshing collection of songs" and "one of the first great albums of 2021".

Writing for The Times, Will Hodgkinson praised the record and noted that "small moments provide this fresh new voice with big stories". Bella Fleming of The Line of Best Fit noted that "the versatility of Collapsed In Sunbeams is beyond comendable" and noted that it is "filled with invigorating yet vulnerable moments". She continued to laud the record and wrote that "Parks' seemingly effortless lyricism and laidback melodies make her songs cosy in winter, and chilled in summer - always to be uplifting and comforting. Every track can mould around different settings and this level of versatility in a debut album is a rarity." Johnny Sharp of Uncut wrote that Parks "punctuates beautifully languid, trip-hoppy vignettes with a voice redolent of Martina Topley-Bird and a neat line in spoken-word poetic musings."

In a review for Exclaim!, Kyle Kohner described Parks as "an extraordinary artist who's shown, through a small body of work, the talent to convey complex emotion with a sense of maturity beyond her 20 years of age, managing to express it all as if she's lived a lifetime or two."

In June 2021, Billboard named the album among the best 15 albums by LGBTQ artists released so far in 2021.

=== Accolades ===
Collapsed in Sunbeams on year-end lists
Publication	List	Rank	Ref.
The Guardian	The 50 Best Albums of 2021	9	
Paste	The 50 Best Albums of 2021	21	

== Track listing ==
All tracks are written by Anaïs Marinho and Gianluca Buccellati, except where noted. All tracks are produced by Gianluca Buccellati, except where noted.

Collapsed in Sunbeams – International standard edition
No.	Title	Writer(s)	Producer(s)	Length
1.	"Collapsed in Sunbeams"		Marinho	0:54
2.	"Hurt"			3:36
3.	"Too Good"	Marinho; Paul Epworth	Epworth	3:41
4.	"Hope"			4:30
5.	"Caroline"			3:26
6.	"Black Dog"			3:48
7.	"Green Eyes"	Marinho; Claire Cottrill; Gianluca Buccellati; Alessandro Buccellati	Gianluca Buccellati, Alessandro Buccellati	3:18
8.	"Just Go"			3:06
9.	"For Violet"			3:32
10.	"Eugene"			3:34
11.	"Bluish"	Marinho; Callum Merrett; Ewan Merrett	Bad Sounds	3:14
12.	"Portra 400"	Marinho; Epworth	Epworth	2:56
Total length:				40:00

Collapsed in Sunbeams – International deluxe edition bonus tracks
No.	Title	Writer(s)	Producer(s)	Length
13.	"Cola" (lofi lounge)	Marinho; Buccellati	Mike Hill	3:40
14.	"Hurt" (lofi lounge)	Marinho; Buccellati	Hill	3:42
15.	"Black Dog" (lofi lounge)	Marinho; Buccellati	Hill	4:23
16.	"Black Dog (Poem)" (lofi lounge)	Marinho	Marinho	1:06
17.	"Bags" (lofi lounge)	Claire Cottrill	Marinho	1:27
18.	"Moon Song" (lofi lounge)	Phoebe Bridgers	Marinho	4:52
19.	"Baby Blue" (lofi lounge)	Archy Marshall	Marinho	2:38
20.	"Ivy" (lofi lounge)	Christopher Breaux; Malay Ho	Marinho	5:24
Total length:				67:00

Collapsed in Sunbeams – Japanese deluxe edition bonus tracks
No.	Title	Writer(s)	Length
13.	"Paperbacks" (Live for On Air)		5:39
14.	"Cola" (Live for On Air)		3:41
15.	"George" (Live for On Air)	Marinho; James Scarbrow; Oscar Scheller	4:03
16.	"Angel's Song" (Live for On Air)		2:48
17.	"Super Sad Generation" (Live for On Air)		3:44
Total length:			59:55

== Personnel ==
=== Musicians ===
- Arlo Parks – vocals (1–20), writing (1–16)

Other musicians

- Gianluca Buccellati – writing (1–16)
- Alessandro Buccellati – writing (7, 15)
- Claire Cottrill – vocals (7), writing (7, 17)
- Phoebe Bridgers – writing (18)
- Archy Marshall – writing (19)
- Christopher Breaux – writing (20)
- Malay Ho – writing (20)
- James Fernandez - Drums (4, 5, 7, 8, 13, 14, 15)

=== Technical ===
- Gianluca Buccellati – production (1–12)

== Charts ==
Chart performance for Collapsed in Sunbeams
Chart (2021)	Peak position
Australian Albums (ARIA)	18
Austrian Albums (Ö3 Austria)	6
Belgian Albums (Ultratop Flanders)	6
Belgian Albums (Ultratop Wallonia)	66
Dutch Albums (Album Top 100)	47
French Albums (SNEP)	84
German Albums (Offizielle Top 100)	10
Irish Albums (Official Charts)	27
New Zealand Albums (RMNZ)	40
Scottish Albums (Official Charts)	3
Swiss Albums (Schweizer Hitparade)	7
UK Albums (Official Charts)	3

== Certifications ==
Region	Certification	Certified units/sales
United Kingdom (BPI)	Gold	100,000^{‡}
^{‡} Sales+streaming figures based on certification alone.
