= Hard Life =

English indie/alternative band

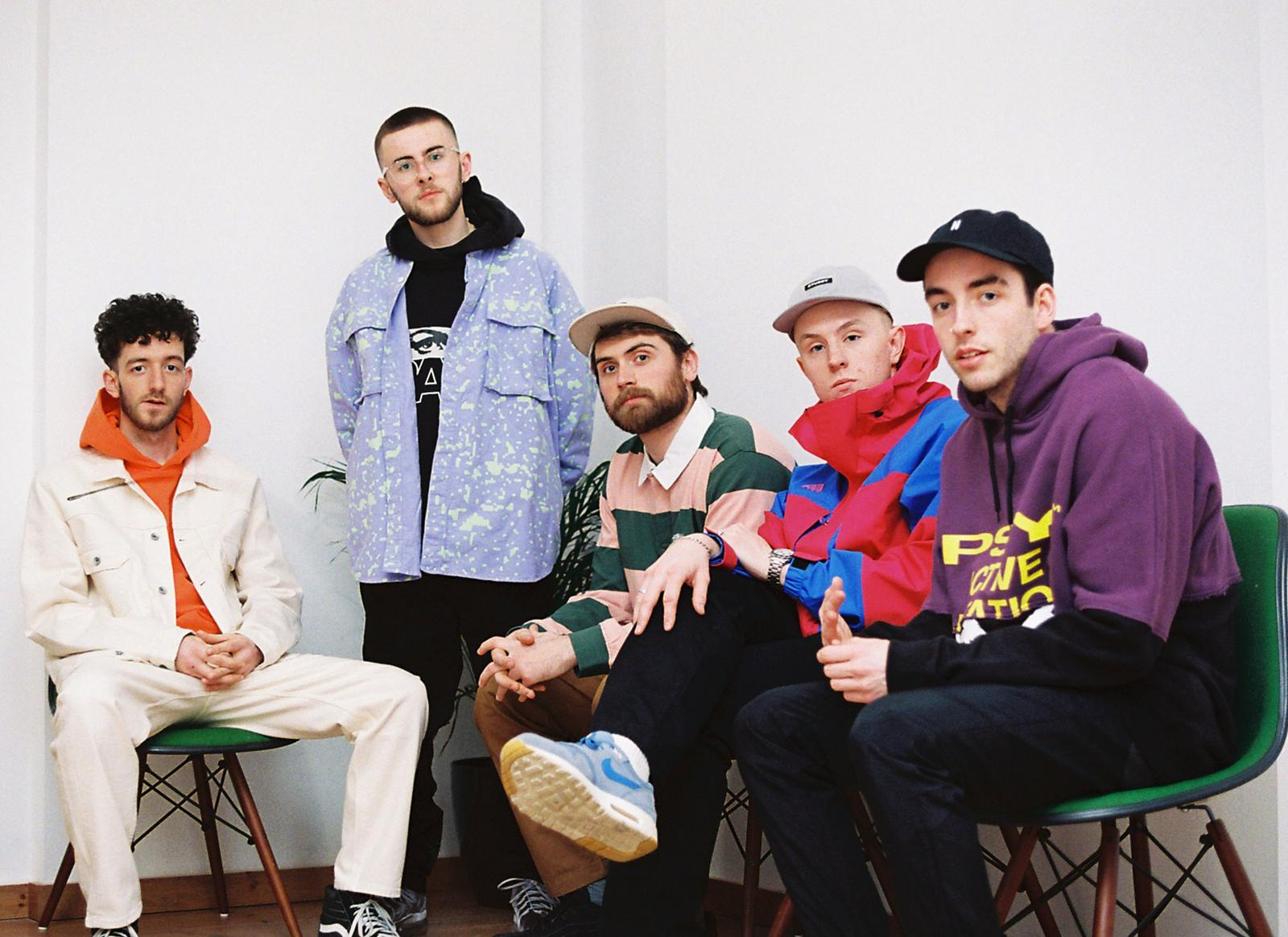
- Hard Life in April 2019

Background information
- Also known as: Easy Life (2017–2023)
- Origin: Leicester, England
- Genres: Indie pop; hip-hop; pop
- Years active: 2017–present
- Label: Island
- Members: Murray Matravers; Oliver Cassidy; Lewis Berry; Jordan Birtles
- Past members: Sam Hewitt
- Website: hardlifemusic.co.uk

hard life (stylised in all lowercase), formerly known as Easy Life, is an English alternative indie pop group formed in Leicester in 2017. They came second in the 2020 edition of the BBC's Sound of..., an annual music poll of music critics and industry figures to find the most promising new music talent. Their third mixtape, Junk Food, reached No. 7 on the UK Albums Chart a day after its release. Their debut studio album, Life's a Beach, was released on 28 May 2021.

The band ceased performing under the Easy Life name in October 2023, after they announced that they were being sued by easyGroup over the use of the "easy" name and were financially unable to contest the dispute in court. In June 2024 the band returned under the new name of Hard Life.

== History ==
The band was formed by frontman Murray Matravers in mid-2017. They released their first single, "Pockets", via Chess Club Records in November 2017, and subsequently signed to Island Records. They released their debut mixtape, Creature Habits, in April 2018. Following the release of the singles "Frank" in July 2018 and "Nightmares" in September 2018, the band appeared on Later... with Jools Holland. They ended 2018 by releasing their fourth single, "Temporary Love Part 1" (with B-side "Temporary Love Part 2"), in December. In 2022 they took to Glastonbury's Pyramid Stage for their second Glastonbury appearance; they featured alongside former Brockhampton member Kevin Abstract, who joined them on stage and forgot his verse.

They released their second mixtape, Spaceships, containing the single "Sunday" in March 2019, and headlined the BBC Introducing stage at the Glastonbury Festival in June. Debuting as Annie Mac's "hottest record" on BBC Radio 1 in July, the band released the single "Earth". The music video, commenting on environmental issues, was shot at a plastic recycling plant in Morocco.

The band released their debut album Life's a Beach on 28 May 2021. It reached the number two spot on the UK Albums Chart. Their second album Maybe in Another Life..., released on 7 October 2022, also reached number two.

The band returned 18 months after their "Easy Life for the very last time" shows on the 18 July 2025 with their third studio album Onion, announcing a UK tour shortly after.

=== Litigation and rebranding ===
In October 2023, The Times reported that Easy Life were being sued for trademark infringement by EasyGroup, a venture capital conglomorate. The company alleged that the band used their branding and imagery of EasyJet, a subsidiary of the group, in their 2021 and 2022 Life's a Beach tour. The band confirmed the lawsuit in a statement posted to their Instagram and X accounts, saying that they found the whole situation hilarious but they were "virtually powerless against such a massive corporation." In a statement to the BBC and The Guardian, a spokesman for EasyGroup referred to the band as "brand thieves." Following EasyGroup's statement the band posted a timeline of their activities from as early as 2015, and pointed out that EasyGroup's trademark application for "Easylife" had been registered in August 2022.

Later that month, Easy Life announced that they would change their name because they did not have the financial resources to continue with the litigation. They played their final performances under the Easy Life name on 12 October 2023 at O2 Academy Leicester, and on 13 October 2023 at Koko in London.

On 11 June 2024, the band announced their rebrand to Hard Life and released their single "Tears" the same day.

In April 2025, the band announced a new album, Onion, released on 18 July 2025, and released a new single, "Othello". In the same month, they collaborated with the Japanese band [Alexandros] on the song "Coffee Float", with Matravers contributing vocals.

== Band members ==
- Murray Matravers – lead vocals, synthesizer, keyboards, trumpet (2017–present)
- Oliver Cassidy – drums, percussion (2017–present)
- Lewis Alexander Berry – guitar (2017–present), bass guitar (2024–present)
- Jordan Birtles – percussion, keyboards, backing vocals (2017–present)

=== Past member ===
- Sam Hewitt – bass guitar, saxophone, backing vocals (2017–2024)

== Discography ==
=== Studio albums ===
List of studio albums, with selected details and chart positions
Title	Details	Peak chart positions			Certifications
Title	Details	UK	IRE	SCO	Certifications
Life's a Beach	Released: 28 May 2021; Label: Island; Format: LP, digital download, streaming, CD	2	47	4	BPI: Silver
Maybe in Another Life...	Released: 7 October 2022; Label: Island; Format: LP, digital download, streaming, CD	2	—	2	
Onion	Released: 18 July 2025; Label: Island; Format: Digital download, streaming	—	—	—	
"—" denotes a recording that did not chart or was not released in that territory.

=== Mixtapes ===
List of mixtapes, with selected details and chart positions
Title	Details	Peak chart positions	
Title	Details	UK	SCO
Creature Habits	Released: 29 March 2018; Label: Easy Co Limited / Island; Format: Digital download, streaming, vinyl	—	—
Spaceships	Released: 22 March 2019; Label: Easy Co Limited / Island; Format: Digital download, streaming, vinyl	—	—
Junk Food	Released: 17 January 2020; Label: Island; Format: Cassette, CD, digital download, streaming, vinyl	7	23
See You Later Maybe Never (Demos)	Released: 8 May 2020; Label: Island; Format: Digital download, streaming	—	—
"—" denotes a recording that did not chart or was not released in that territory.

=== Singles ===
Title	Year	Peak chart positions				Certifications	Album
Title	Year	UK Sales	ICE	JPN Over.	SCO	Certifications	Album
"Pockets"	2017	—	—	—	—		Creature Habits
"Frank"	2018	— (Note: "Frank" did not enter the UK Single Sales Chart, but peaked at number four on the UK Physical Singles Chart.)	—	—	—		Non-album single
"Nightmares"	2018	54	—	—	82	BPI: Silver	Life's a Beach
"Temporary Love"	2018	—	—	—	—		Non-album singles
"Houseplants"	2019	—	—	—	—		Non-album singles
"Sunday"	2019	—	—	—	—		Spaceships
"Earth"	2019	—	—	—	—		Junk Food
"Nice Guys"	2019	—	—	—	—		Junk Food
"sangria" (featuring Arlo Parks)	2019	—	—	—	—		Junk Food
"Dead Celebrities"	2020	—	—	—	—		Junk Food
"Peanut Butter" / "Petty Crime"	2020	— (Note: "Peanut Butter" / "Petty Crime" did not enter the UK Single Sales Chart, but peaked at number 15 on the UK Physical Singles Chart.)	—	—	—		See You Later Maybe Never (Demos)
"Daydreams"	2020	—	—	—	—		Life's a Beach
"A Message to Myself"	2021	—	—	—	—		Life's a Beach
"Skeletons"	2021	—	14	16	—		Life's a Beach
"Have a Great Day"	2021	—	9	—	—		Life's a Beach
"Ocean View"	2021	—	18	—	—		Life's a Beach
"Beeswax"	2022	—	—	—	—		Maybe in Another Life...
"Dear Miss Holloway" (featuring Kevin Abstract)	2022	—	—	—	—		Maybe in Another Life...
"OTT" (featuring BENEE)	2022	—	—	—	—		Maybe in Another Life...
"Fortune Cookie"	2022	—	—	—	—		Maybe in Another Life...
"Trust Exercises"	2023	4	—	—	—		Non-album single
"Tears"	2024	—	—	—	—		Onion
"Othello"	2025	—	—	—	—		Onion
"Ogre"	2025	—	—	16	—		Onion
"Y3llow Bike"	2025	—	—	—	—		Onion
"—" denotes a recording that did not chart or was not released in that territory.

== Awards and nominations ==
Year	Nominee / work	Award	Result
2020	Easy Life	NME Best New British Act	Won
