= Arlo Parks =

British singer (born 2000)

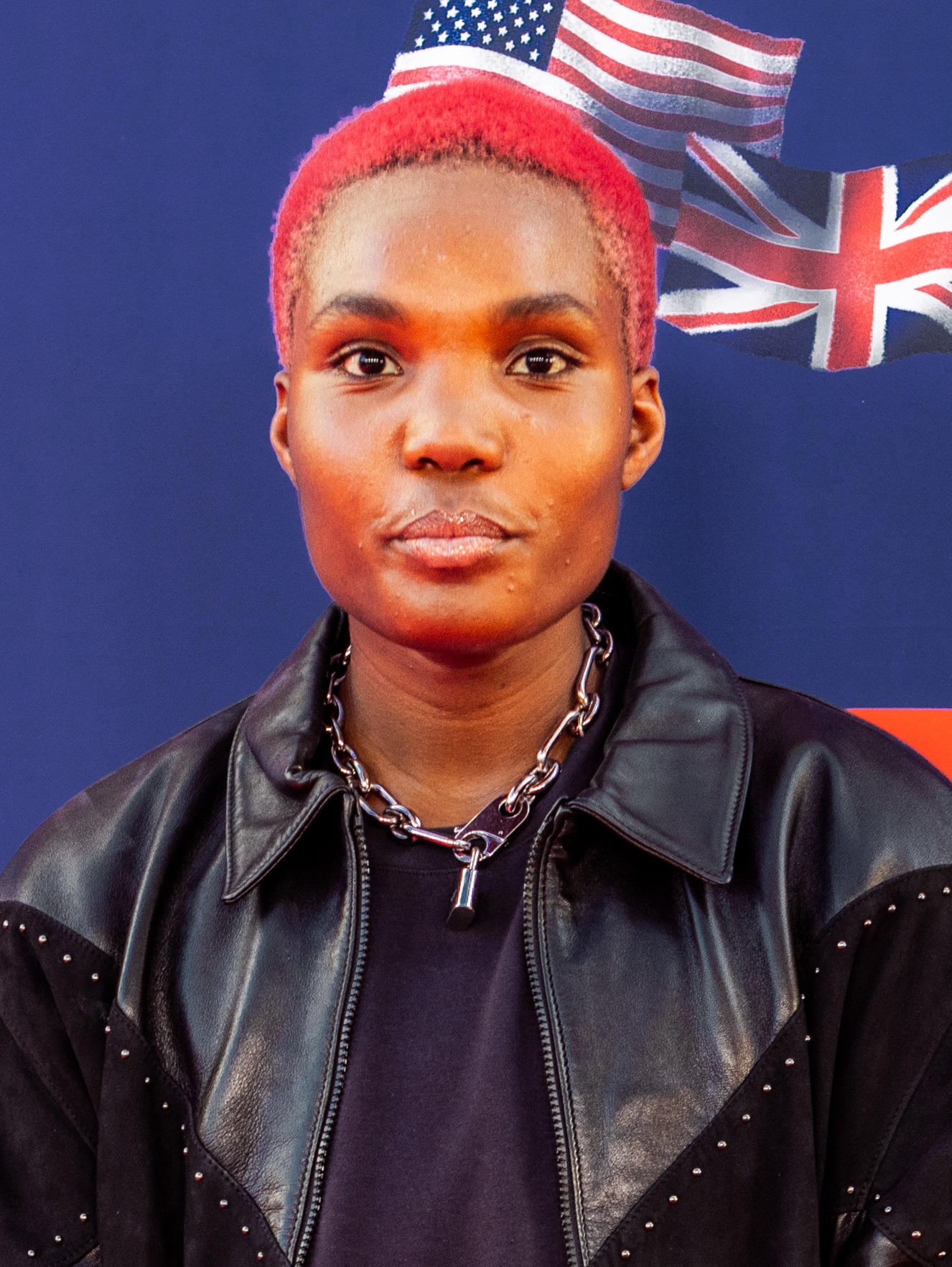
- Parks in 2026

Background information
- Born: Anaïs Oluwatoyin Estelle Marinho; 9 August 2000 (age 26); London, England
- Genres: Indie pop; indie folk; R&B
- Occupations: Singer; songwriter; poet
- Years active: 2018–present
- Labels: Beatnik; Transgressive
- Website: arloparksofficial.com

Anaïs Oluwatoyin Estelle Marinho (born 9 August 2000), known professionally as Arlo Parks, is an English singer and songwriter. Her debut studio album, Collapsed in Sunbeams, was released in 2021 to critical acclaim and peaked at number three on the UK Albums Chart. It won the 2021 Mercury Prize for Best Album and earned her nominations for Album of the Year, Best New Artist and Best British Female Solo Artist at the 2021 Brit Awards.

== Early life ==
Anaïs Oluwatoyin Estelle Marinho was born on 9 August 2000, and raised in Hammersmith, West London. She is of half Nigerian, quarter Chadian and quarter French ancestry. Her mother was born in Paris. Marinho learned to speak French before she learned English.

She was educated at Latymer Upper School in Hammersmith and completed her A Levels in early 2019 at Ashbourne College. In the autobiographical text on her Spotify profile, Parks claimed that she spent most of secondary school "feeling like that Black kid who couldn't dance for shit, listening to too much emo music and crushing on some girl in her Spanish class."

== Career ==
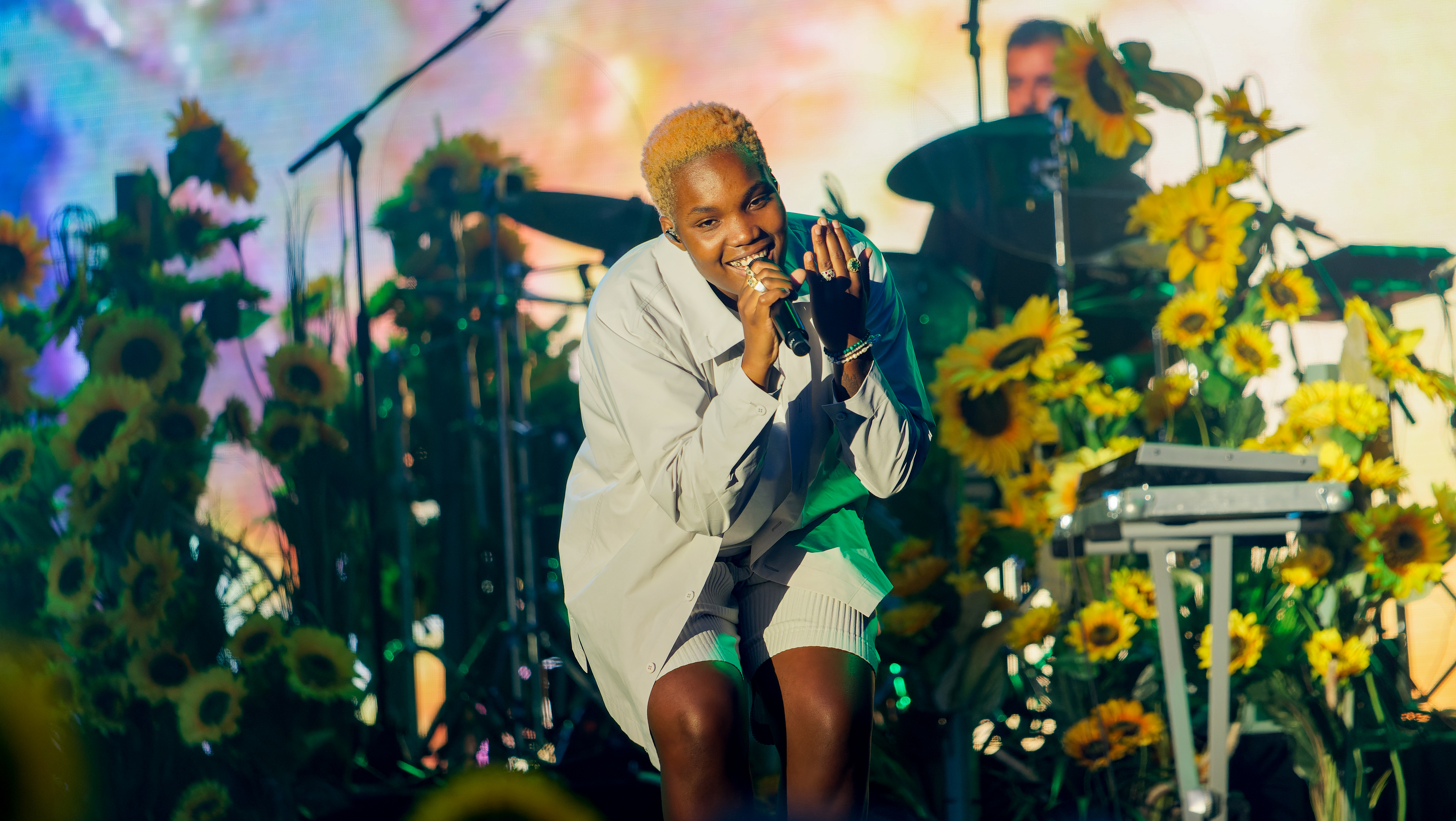
Parks performing in 2022 at Somerset House

=== 2018–2019: Super Sad Generation and Sophie ===
Parks chose her stage name as a distinctive personal pseudonym, inspired by King Krule and Frank Ocean. In 2018, she began uploading demos to BBC Music Introducing. This caught the attention of radio presenters across the UK who distributed these demos to Ali Raymond of Beatnik Creative, who soon began managing Parks. She made her solo debut when she released the song "Cola" through Beatnik Records in November 2018, and announced the release of her debut EP, Super Sad Generation. She told Line of Best Fit that the song is "a reminder that betrayal is inevitable when it comes to pretty people that think flowers fix everything." Olivia Swash wrote that the vocals on the song "flourish thanks to [Parks'] creative writing background, with her delicate tone taking centre stage against the gently plodding guitars and the soft crackle of vinyl." By November 2019, the song had amassed over three million streams on Spotify.

Following the release of "Cola", Parks signed to Transgressive Records. She released the title track of her upcoming EP, Super Sad Generation, in January 2019. Robin Murray told Clash that the song portrays an "astute, nuanced creative control that also utilises word-play that speaks of youthful emotions spinning out of control." Her third single, "Romantic Garbage", was released in March 2019, before the release of the full four-track EP, Super Sad Generation in early April 2019. The EP was recorded in her home in South West London and an Airbnb in the Angel district of London with producer and co-writer Gianluca Buccellati.

Parks performed her first-ever gig at The Great Escape in Brighton in May 2019, then went on to perform on the BBC Music Introducing stage at Glastonbury Festival in late June 2019, as well as at Latitude Festival in July 2019. She embarked on her first tour supporting Jordan Rakei on the UK leg of his tour in September 2019. Throughout the last half of 2019 Parks released the songs "George", "Second Guessing", "Sophie", and "Angel's Song" ahead of her second EP, Sophie. Sean Kerwick told DIY that the five-track EP "oozes with the hang-ups of heartbreak and mortality; a topic that seems to overshadow many gen-Z musicians."

=== 2020–2022: Collapsed in Sunbeams ===
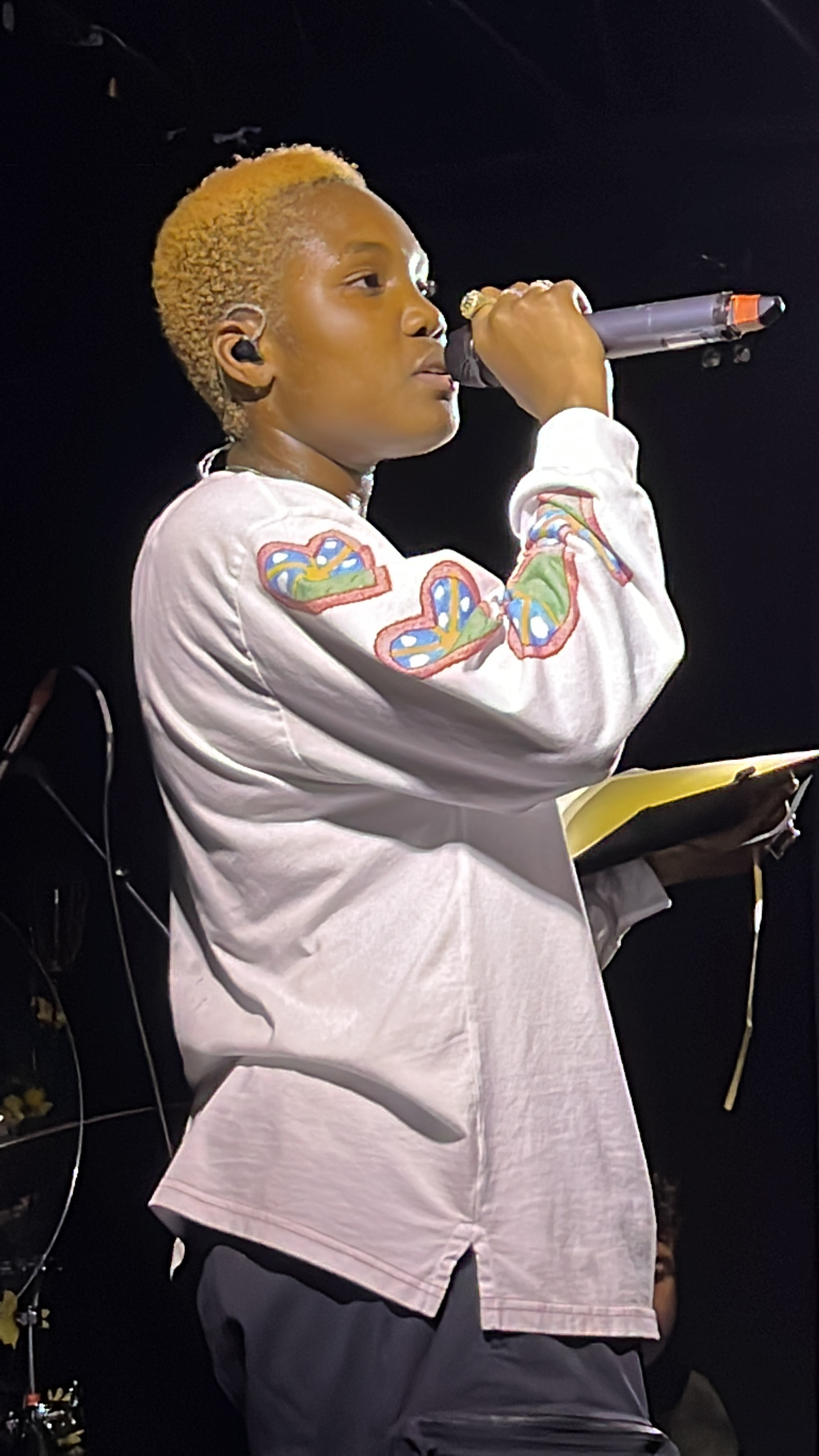
Parks performing in 2021

Parks embarked on her first headlining tour of Europe in February and March 2020, but could not complete it due to the COVID-19 pandemic. In May 2020, Parks released the singles "Eugene" and "Black Dog", which were well received during the COVID-19 lockdown, the latter of which became BBC Radio 1's Tune of the Week. Parks made the front cover of NME in late July 2020. She won the AIM Independent Music Award for One to Watch in 2020 in August 2020, after losing the same award to Georgia a year before. Parks and Moses Boyd made the front cover of Music Week for the publication's indie takeover special following the AIM Awards ceremony. Parks released her debut album, Collapsed in Sunbeams, on 29 January 2021. The album title comes from the book On Beauty by Zadie Smith, whose writing Parks has said she admires.

On 12 February 2021, Parks was the music act on The Graham Norton Show singing "Caroline". On 19 February 2021, Parks was the main guest of Jools Holland on his BBC programme Later....

On 11 May, Parks won the Breakthrough Artist Award at the 2021 Brit Awards. On 9 September, the album Collapsed in Sunbeams won the Hyundai Mercury Prize for Album of the Year. Presenting the award, judge Annie MacManus said: "We chose an artist with a singular voice who uses lyrics of remarkable beauty … and connects deeply with her generation as she does so".

Following her Collapsed in Sunbeams tour, Parks has performed as the 2022 opening act for Harry Styles, Billie Eilish and Clairo.

On 25 June 2022, Parks performed a 53-minute set on The Park Stage at Glastonbury Festival 2022, before joining Phoebe Bridgers later in the day to perform "Graceland Too".

During Glastonbury, Parks was selected as a guest for the CBeebies Bedtime Story, reading Once Upon a Rhythm by James Carter.

In September 2022, she cancelled her tour dates in the United States, citing mental health concerns.

On September 8th 2022 her song Eugene was the last song to be played on BBC Radio 1 before it was interrupted to announce the death of Elizabeth II.

=== 2023–present: My Soft Machine and Ambiguous Desire ===
On 18 January 2023, Parks announced the release of her second studio album, My Soft Machine, which was released on 26 May 2023. The album's title comes from a piece of dialogue from the 2019 film The Souvenir. The album's lead single, "Weightless", was released with the announcement. This was followed by singles "Impurities", released 1 March 2023, and "Blades" released 19 April 2023. A fourth single, "Pegasus", was released on 10 May 2023, featuring artist Phoebe Bridgers, with whom Parks had previously performed with on BBC Radio 1 in 2020 and at Coachella in 2022. Of the single, Parks said "'Pegasus' is about experiencing the warmth and lightness of good love for the first time," and "It also explores how the absence of chaos and the presence of real connection can be a little bit terrifying after a long time of not having it." Parks toured South Korea, Japan, Australia, and New Zealand in the months following the release of her new album. On 13 June 2023, Parks announced her debut poetry book, The Magic Border, which was released on 12 September 2023. She began her European tour on 5 September 2023 in Dublin.

In March 2024, Parks received writing credits for the song "Ya Ya", performed by Beyoncé on the album Cowboy Carter.

On 13 January 2026, Parks announced her third studio album, Ambiguous Desire would release on 3 April. It was preceded by the singles "2Sided", "Heaven", "Get Go", and "Beams".

== Musical style ==
Parks has named Elliott Smith, Sylvia Plath, Radiohead and Joni Mitchell as among her influences.

== Personal life ==
Parks is bisexual and is based in Los Angeles.

Parks began dating the singer Ashnikko in December 2021. They split in 2024, with Ashnikko referencing the breakup in her debut performance of her song "Itty Bitty" while opening for Billie Eilish in December 2024.

== Discography ==
- Collapsed in Sunbeams (2021)
- My Soft Machine (2023)
- Ambiguous Desire (2026)

== Awards and nominations ==
Organization	Year	Category	Nominated work	Result	Ref.
AIM Independent Music Awards	2019	One to Watch	Arlo Parks	Nominated	
AIM Independent Music Awards	2020	One to Watch	Arlo Parks	Won	
AIM Independent Music Awards	2021	UK Independent Breakthrough	Arlo Parks	Won	
AIM Independent Music Awards	2021	Best Live (Streamed) Act	Arlo Parks	Nominated	
AIM Independent Music Awards	2021	PPL Award for Most Played New Independent Artist	Arlo Parks	Nominated	
AIM Independent Music Awards	2021	Best Independent Album	Collapsed in Sunbeams	Won	
AIM Independent Music Awards	2021	Best Independent Track	"Hope"	Nominated	
AIM Independent Music Awards	2021	Best Independent Video	"Hope"	Nominated	
AIM Independent Music Awards	2022	Best Independent Video	"Softly"	Nominated	
AIM Independent Music Awards	2022	PPL Award for Most Played New Independent Artist	Arlo Parks	Nominated	
BBC	2020	Sound of 2020	Arlo Parks	Longlisted	
BBC	2020	Introducing Artist of the Year	Arlo Parks	Won	
BBC	2020	Hottest Record of the Year	"Black Dog"	Shortlisted	
UK Music Video Awards	2020	Best R&B/Soul Video – Newcomer	"Black Dog"	Nominated	
UK Music Video Awards	2021	Best Pop Video - UK	"Hope"	Nominated	
UK Music Video Awards	2022	Best Pop Video - UK	"Softly"	Nominated	
UK Music Video Awards	2022	Best Production Design in a Video	"Softly"	Nominated	
BRIT Awards	2021	Album of the Year	Collapsed in Sunbeams	Nominated	
BRIT Awards	2021	Best British Female Solo Artist	Arlo Parks	Nominated	
BRIT Awards	2021	Best New Artist	Arlo Parks	Won	
Music Managers Forum	2021	Breakthrough Artist & Manager	Arlo Parks and Ali Raymond	Won	
BET Awards	2021	Best New International Act	Arlo Parks	Nominated	
Mercury Prize	2021	Album of the Year	Collapsed in Sunbeams	Won	
Ivor Novello Award	2021	Best Song Musically and Lyrically	Black Dog	Nominated	
MOBO Awards	2021	Album of the Year	Collapsed in the Sunbeams	Nominated	
MOBO Awards	2021	Best Newcomer	Arlo Parks	Nominated	
MOBO Awards	2021	Best Female Act	Arlo Parks	Nominated	
Music Week Awards	2021	PR Campaign	Arlo Parks	Nominated	
Music Video Festival	2021	Revelation in Direction	"Too Good"	Nominated	
BMI London Awards	2021	Impact Award	Arlo Parks	Won	
GLAAD Media Awards	2022	Outstanding Breakthrough Music Artist	Collapsed in Sunbeams	Nominated	
Grammy Awards	2022	Best New Artist	Arlo Parks	Nominated	
Grammy Awards	2022	Best Alternative Music Album	Collapsed in Sunbeams	Nominated	
NME Awards	2022	Best Solo Act in the World	Arlo Parks	Nominated	
NME Awards	2022	Best Solo Act from the UK	Arlo Parks	Nominated	
Libera Awards	2022	Record of the Year	Collapsed in Sunbeams	Nominated	
Libera Awards	2022	Best Pop Record	Collapsed in Sunbeams	Won	
Berlin Music Video Awards	2022	Best Concept	SOFTLY	Nominated	
