= Transgressive Records =

English independent record label

- Founded: 2004
- Founder: Tim Dellow and Toby L
- Location: London, England
- Official website: transgressiverecords.com

Transgressive Records is an independent record label based in London, founded in 2004. Its founders, Tim Dellow and Toby L, first met at a Bloc Party gig organised by Toby's Rockfeedback website.

The label's debut release was "1am" by the Subways in September 2004, quickly followed by singles from Mystery Jets, the Young Knives and Regina Spektor. Artists on its current roster include Flume, Sophie, Arlo Parks, Alvvays, Julia Jacklin and Damon Albarn.

The company also formed Transgressive Management, representing Johnny Flynn, Marika Hackman, Let's Eat Grandma and Wesley Joseph, alongside Transgressive Publishing, working with Black Country, New Road, Foals, Loyle Carner and more.

In 2021, Transgressive released Arlo Parks debut album Collapsed in Sunbeams, which was awarded the Mercury Prize.

In 2026, Transgressive Records / Canvasback signed Los Angeles-based four-piece Jawdropped.

== Artists ==
=== Transgressive Records ===
- Alvvays
- The Antlers
- Arlo Parks
- Beverly Glenn-Copeland
- Damon Albarn
- Dave Okumu
- Ed O'Brien
- Flume
- Foals
- Greg Freeman
- Johnny Flynn
- The Joy
- Julia Jacklin
- KOKOKO!
- Let's Eat Grandma
- MICHELLE
- The Moonlandingz
- Mutual Benefit
- Mykki Blanco
- Neon Indian
- SOPHIE
- Songhoy Blues
- Sparks
- The Waeve

=== Transgressive Publishing ===
- Black Country, New Road
- Foals
- Great Good Fine Ok
- Loyle Carner
- Marika Hackman
- Odetta Hartman

=== Transgressive Management ===
- Johnny Flynn
- Marika Hackman
- Let's Eat Grandma
- Wesley Joseph

=== paradYse records ===
- Blaenavon
- Calpurnia
- Cosmo Sheldrake
- Favela
- Flyte
- Loyle Carner
- Marika Hackman
- Spring King
- Theme Park
- Toothless
- Thumpers

=== Past artists ===
- At the Drive In
- Blaenavon
- Bloc Party
- Calpurnia
- Circa Waves
- Cosmo Sheldrake
- Dry the River
- Esser
- Famy
- Gaggle
- Gengahr
- Graham Coxon
- Hippo Campus
- Iron & Wine
- Jeremy Warmsley
- Ladyfuzz
- Larrikin Love
- Liam Finn
- Miles Benjamin Anthony Robinson
- Mystery Jets
- Noisettes
- Ox.Eagle.Lion.Man
- Pulled Apart by Horses
- Regina Spektor
- The Pipettes
- The Rumble Strips
- The Shins
- The Subways
- Young Knives

== See also ==
- List of record labels
