= Remi Wolf discography =

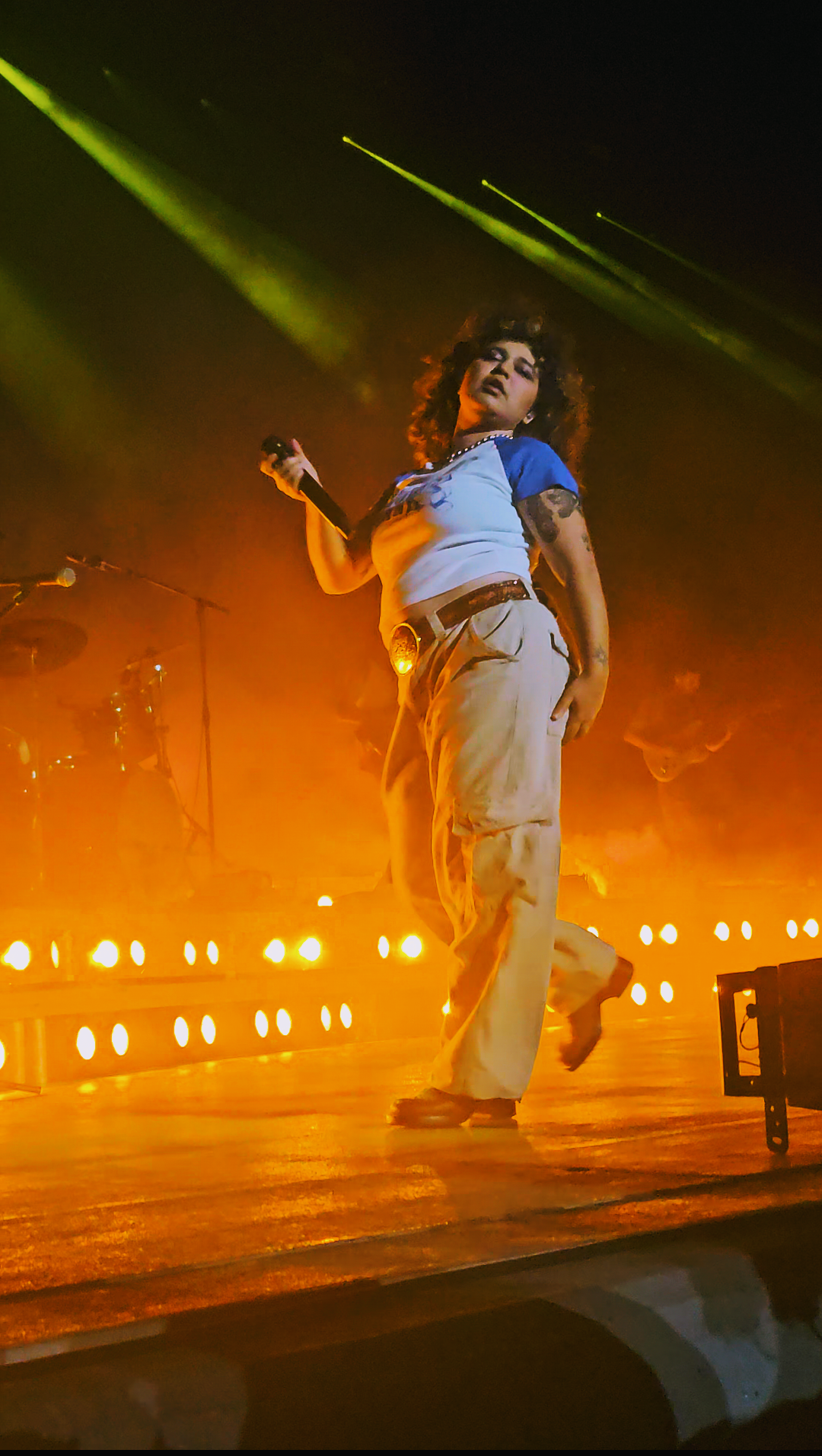
- Remi Wolf in 2024
- Studio albums: 3
- EPs: 3
- Singles: 30

American singer and songwriter Remi Wolf has released three studio albums, three extended plays, and 30 singles, with other appearances. Her second and third studio albums, Big Ideas and Mud, debuted on the Billboard 200.

== Studio albums ==
List of studio albums with selected album details
Title	Details	Peak chart positions				
Title	Details	US	AUS	NZ	SCO	UK Sales
Juno	Released: October 15, 2021; Label: Island; Formats: CD, digital download, streaming, vinyl	— (Note: Juno did not enter the Billboard 200 chart, but peaked at number 16 on the Heatseekers Albums chart.)	—	—	—	—
Big Ideas	Released: July 12, 2024; Label: Island; Formats: CD, digital download, streaming, vinyl	95	—	—	27	15
Mud	Released: October 9, 2026; Label: Island; Formats: CD, digital download, streaming, vinyl	18	20	32	49	15
"—" denotes a recording that did not chart or was not released in that territory.

== Extended plays ==
=== Studio ===
List of EPs with selected album details
Title	Details
You're a Dog!	Released: September 20, 2019; Label: Island; Formats: digital download, streaming
I'm Allergic to Dogs!	Released: June 24, 2020; Label: Island; Formats: digital download, streaming
We Love Dogs!	Released: May 5, 2021; Label: Island; Formats: CD, digital download, streaming, vinyl

=== Live ===
Title	Details
Live at Electric Lady EP	Released: August 4, 2022; Label: Island; Formats: digital download, streaming

== Singles ==
=== As lead artist ===
List of singles as lead artist, showing year released, peak chart positions and album name
Title	Year	Peak chart positions							Certifications	Album
Title	Year	US Alt. Air.	US Alt. Dig.	US Rock	ISR TV Air.	JPN Over.	NZ Hot	UK Sales	Certifications	Album
"Guy"	2019	—	—	—	—	—	—	—		You're a Dog!
"Sauce"	2019	—	—	—	—	—	—	—		You're a Dog!
"Shawty"	2019	—	—	—	—	—	—	—		You're a Dog!
"Rufufus"	2019	—	—	—	—	—	—	—		You're a Dog!
"Bad Behavior" (with Austin Millz)	2019	—	—	—	—	—	—	—		Non-album single
"Woo!"	2020	—	—	—	—	—	—	—		I'm Allergic to Dogs!
"Photo ID" (solo or remix featuring Dominic Fike)	2020	—	—	—	—	—	—	—	RIAA: Gold; ARIA: Gold	I'm Allergic to Dogs!
"Disco Man"	2020	—	—	—	—	—	—	—		I'm Allergic to Dogs!
"Monte Carlo"	2020	—	—	—	—	—	—	—		Non-album single
"Hello Hello Hello"	2020	28	12	—	—	—	—	—		I'm Allergic to Dogs!
"Liz"	2021	—	—	—	—	—	—	—		Juno (Deluxe)
"Liquor Store"	2021	—	—	—	—	—	—	—		Juno
"Quiet On Set"	2021	—	—	—	—	—	—	—		Juno
"Grumpy Old Man"	2021	—	—	—	—	—	—	—		Juno
"Guerrilla"	2021	—	—	—	—	—	—	—		Juno
"Sexy Villain"	2021	—	—	—	—	—	—	—		Juno
"Anthony Kiedis"	2021	—	—	—	—	—	—	—		Juno
"Front Tooth"	2021	—	—	—	—	—	—	—		Juno
"Telepatía"	2022	—	—	—	—	—	—	—		Non-album singles
"Pool" (with Still Woozy)	2022	—	—	—	—	—	—	—		Non-album singles
"Michael"	2022	—	—	—	—	—	—	—		Juno (Deluxe)
"Prescription"	2023	—	—	—	—	—	—	—		Non-album single
"Cinderella"	2024	—	—	48	—	6	—	—		Big Ideas
"Toro"	2024	—	—	—	—	—	—	33		Big Ideas
"Alone in Miami"	2024	—	—	—	—	—	—	—		Big Ideas
"Motorcycle"	2024	—	—	—	—	9	—	—		Big Ideas
"Soup"	2024	—	—	—	—	—	—	—		Big Ideas
"Twiggy"	2026	—	—	40	—	—	32	—		Mud
"Bottle"	2026	—	—	32	—	—	30	—		Mud
"I Won't Cry"	2026	—	—	37	1	—	—	—		Mud
"Champagne"	2026	—	—	35	—	3	18	—		Mud
"—" denotes a recording that did not chart or was not released in that territory.

=== As featured artist ===
List of singles as featured artist, showing year released, peak chart positions and album name
Title	Year	Album
"Slept with a Monster" (nativetoEarth featuring Remi Wolf)	2017	Non-album singles
"Cheesin'" (Cautious Clay featuring Still Woozy, Melanie Faye, Claud, Remi Wolf, HXNS, and Sophie Meiers)	2020	Non-album singles
"OK" (Wallows featuring Remi Wolf and Solomonophonic)	2021	Remote (Deluxe)
"Pyjamas" (Benny Sings featuring Remi Wolf)	2023	Young Hearts
"Hospital (One Man Down)" (Madison Cunningham featuring Remi Wolf)	2023	Revealer (Deluxe Edition)
"You First (Re: Remi Wolf)" (Paramore featuring Remi Wolf)	2023	Re: This Is Why
"Lucky" (Zedd featuring Remi Wolf)	2024	Telos
"Children of the Baked Potato" (Thundercat featuring Remi Wolf)	2025	Non-album single

== Other charted songs ==
List of other charted songs, showing year released, peak chart positions and album name
Title	Year	Peak chart positions		Album
Title	Year	US Rock	NZ Hot	Album
"Burn Me Blue"	2026	50	—	Mud
"Moon So High" (with John Mayer)	2026	44	34	Mud

== Songwriting credits ==
Year	Artist(s)	Album	Song	Co-written with
2018	Wallows	Spring	"These Days"	Braeden Lemasters, Dylan Minnette, Cole Preston, Julian McClanahan
2020	George Alice, Nasaya	Growing Pains	"Stuck in a Bubble"	George Alice, Théo Hoarau
2023	Jacob Collier	Djesse Vol. 4	"Wellll"	Jacob Collier
