= Solomonophonic =

American Grammy-winning record producer, songwriter, and musician from California

Jared Paul Solomon, known professionally as Solomonophonic, is an American Grammy-winning record producer, songwriter, and musician from California.

He has collaborated with artists such as Remi Wolf, BROCKHAMPTON, SZA, Dominic Fike and Lola Young. Notably, he contributed to SZA's album SOS, which received nine nominations at the 2024 Grammy Awards, including Album of the Year. Additionally, Solomonophonic co-produced Lola Young's album This Wasn't Meant For You Anyway, released in 2024.

In 2025, Solomon won the Grammy Award for Best Progressive R&B Album for his work as a songwriter on SZA's song "Saturn".

== Discography ==
- BROCKHAMPTON – "Man on the Moon" (2022)
- Carly Rae Jepsen – "Shooting Star" (2022)
- Chappell Roan – "After Midnight" (2023)
- Doja Cat – "OKLOSER" (2024)
- Fousheé – "Single Af" (2020), "Do You Have a Soul?", "Flowers" (2024)
- Jawny – "You Got A Man" (2020)
- Lil Nas X – "Right There!" (2025)
- Lola Young – This Wasn't Meant for You Anyway (2024), I'm Only F**king Myself (2025)
- Omar Apollo – "Pilot" (2023)
- Ravyn Lenae – "Love Is Blind" (2024)
- Remi Wolf – You're a Dog! (2019), I'm Allergic to Dogs! (2020), We Love Dogs! (2021), Juno (2021), Big Ideas (2024), Mud (2026)
- Reneé Rapp – "Mad" (2025)
- Spill Tab – Klepto (2023), Angie (2025)
- Still Woozy – "Best Thing" (2021), "Pool" (2022)
- SZA – "Saturn", "Diamond Boy (DTM)" (2024)
- Teezo Touchdown – "Nu Nay" (2023)
