= Spill Tab =

French Korean musician (born 1997)

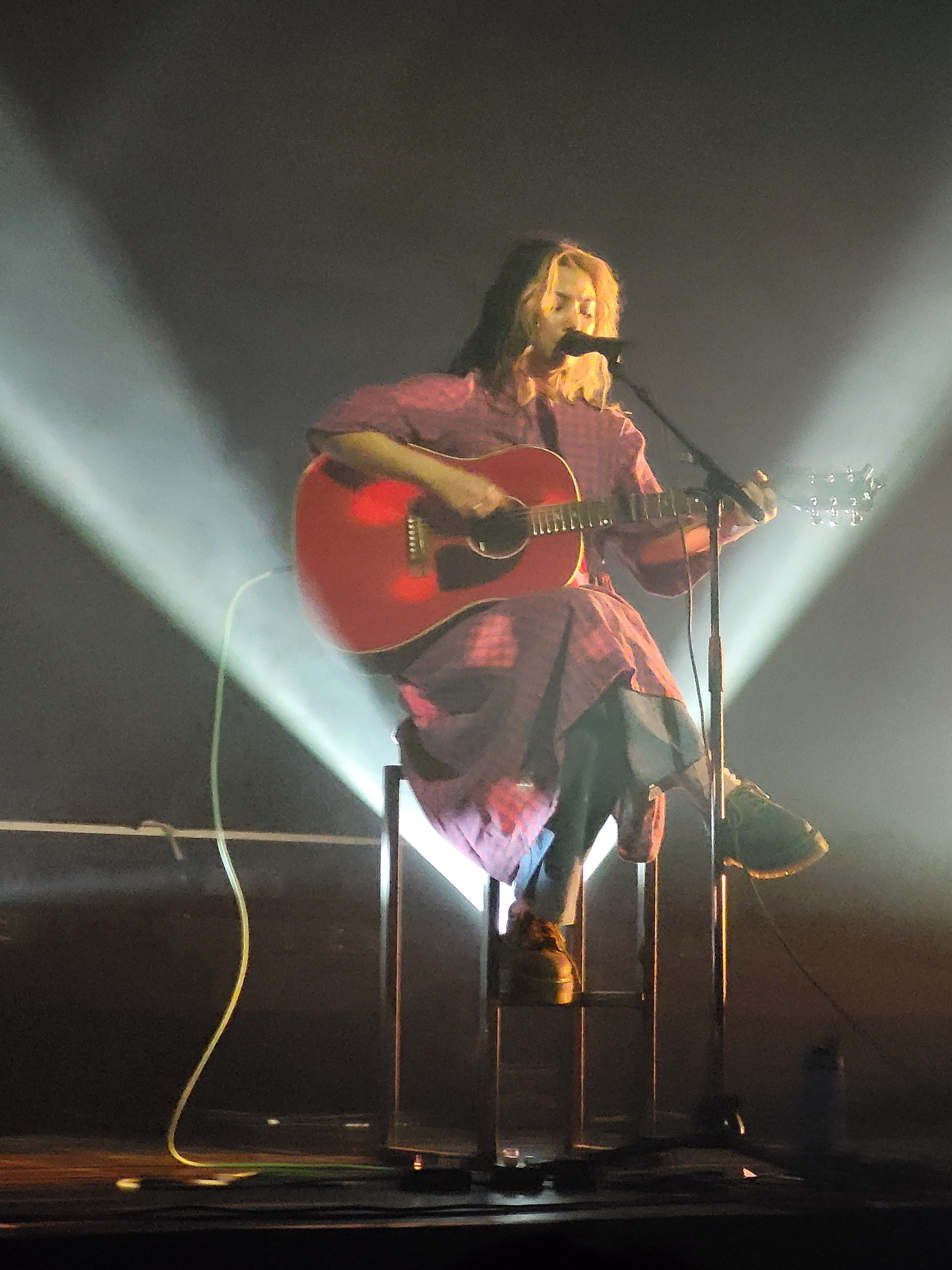
- Spill Tab performing in France in 2025

Background information
- Born: Claire Chicha; July 12, 1997 (age 29); Bangkok, Thailand
- Origin: Los Angeles
- Genres: Alt pop; bedroom pop
- Instruments: Vocals; guitar; ukulele; bass

Claire Chicha (born July 12, 1997), known by her stage name Spill Tab (stylized as spill tab), is a Los Angeles-based singer-songwriter. She sings in English and French. An alternative pop musician, she has been noted by music media outlets for her lo-fi vocals and sound.

== Early life ==
Born in Bangkok, Thailand to an Algerian father and a South Korean mother, Chicha has spent time growing up in Paris, Los Angeles, and Bangkok.

== Career ==
=== Tour managing and Oatmilk (2019–2020) ===
Based in Los Angeles, Chicha first ventured into the music industry working as an A&R intern, and merchandise manager for her close friend Gus Dapperton. She released her debut single, "Decompose", in September 2019. Shortly after, her music began gaining some traction at the beginning of the COVID-19 pandemic. In December 2020, she released the track "name" and its accompanying music video, in addition to her debut EP Oatmilk. The EP features production work from David Marinelli, her main collaborator.

=== Bonnie (2021–2022) ===
In January 2021, NME included her on their "NME 100" list highlighting emerging artists. Later in the year, the publication would write a profile on her as part of their Breakout series covering emerging artists. In March, she released the single "Pistolwhip". In April, she released the single "Anybody Else". She featured on Posse EP Vol. 1, a collaborative EP by Metronomy. In September, she released the single "Grade A" featuring Jawny. In December, she released the EP Bonnie. It featured collaborations with Gus Dapperton, Jawny, and Tommy Genesis. The EP was originally set to release in October. A music video for "Velcro" featuring Dappteron was released the following February.

Chicha's profile increased in 2022, during which she was often touring. In January, Complex highlighted her as an artist "to watch in 2022".

=== Klepto (2022) ===
In March and May, she released the singles "Sunburn" and "Splinter", respectively. The Fader included the latter among their monthly listing of top rock songs. She partnered with American Eagle Outfitters for their "Back-to-School" campaign on the TikTok SoundOn platform. In October, Chicha was announced as a performer for the 2023 SXSW festival. In their announcement, SXSW called spill tab one of 2022's "buzziest artists." Chicha has previously performed for French brands Hermés and YSL. She performed in August for the latter's live sessions at Saint Laurent Rive Droite. In November, she released the single "Crème Brûlée". Also in November, Chicha featured on Mac Wetha's "Play Pretend" track.

In January 2023, she was featured on the single "Borderline Insane" with Matilda Mann. In February 2023, she was featured on the track "Cockpit" by Billy Lemos, alongside Binki and Harve. In March 2023, she released the single "Window". On July 20, 2023, she released her third EP, Klepto.

=== Angie (2025–present) ===
Chicha released her debut studio album, Angie on 16 May 2025, through Because Music Records.

== Musical style ==
Featuring a "lo-fi sound and stripped-down production", Chicha's music has been described by media outlets as "alt-pop" and "bedroom pop". Chicha's inspirations include Remi Wolf, Caroline Polachek, and Hiatus Kaiyote.

The Washington Post's Anying Guo has written that Chicha and Marinelli go beyond "run-of-the-mill bedroom pop", with Chicha quiet and often-layered vocals "[slicing] through dreamy, electro-dance ready introspections." (Note: While some sources refer to Spill Tab as a joint act between Chicha and Marinelli, and Chicha has referred to Marinelli as her main collaborator, other sources refer to "Spill Tab" as an individual singer or artist.) Marinelli's production on spill tab tracks fuse various genres such as R&B and electro-pop. Brenton Blanchet of Complex has called Chicha's music "undeniably sticky", describing her brand of pop as "vocal-layered, sunny-yet-sometimes-angsty, and melody-fueled." A French-Korean, Chicha often sings in French, such as on "Calvaire". Chicha also plays the guitar and ukulele.

== Discography ==
=== Studio albums ===
| Title | Details |
|---|---|
| Angie | Released on: 16 May 2025; Label: Because Music Records; Format: digital download, streaming |

=== Extended plays ===
| Title | Details |
|---|---|
| Oatmilk | Released on: December 1, 2020; Label: Arista Records, Sony Music; Format: digital download, streaming |
| Bonnie | Released on: December 3, 2021; Label: Arista Records, Sony Music; Format: digital download, streaming |
| Klepto | Released on: July 20, 2023; Label: Arista Records, Sony Music; Format: digital download, streaming |

=== Singles ===
==== As lead artist ====
List of singles, showing year released and album name
| Title | Year | Album |
|---|---|---|
| "Decompose" | 2019 | non-album single |
| "Calvaire" | 2020 | Oatmilk |
| "Cotton Candy" | 2020 | Oatmilk |
| "Santé" | 2020 | Oatmilk |
| "PISTOLWHIP" | 2021 | Bonnie |
| "Anybody Else" | 2021 | Bonnie |
| "Indecisive" (featuring Tommy Genesis) | 2021 | Bonnie |
| "Grade A" (featuring JAWNY) | 2021 | Bonnie |
| "Velcro" (featuring Gus Dapperton) | 2021 | Bonnie |
| "Sunburn" | 2022 | Klepto |
| "Splinter" | 2022 | Klepto |
| "CRÈME BRÛLÉE!" | 2022 | Klepto |
| "Borderline Insane" (with Matilda Mann) | 2023 | non-album single |
| "Window" | 2023 | Klepto |

=== Guest appearances ===
List of guest appearances, showing song title, year released, other artists and album name
| Title | Year | Artist(s) | Album |
|---|---|---|---|
| "Loneliness Pt. 2" | 2020 | Aaron Taos | Birthday Boy (Party Favors) |
| "Weather" | 2021 | Junior Varsity | Junior Varsity |
| "no friends" | 2021 | mazie, MIA GLADSTONE | the rainbow cassette |
| "Uneasy" | 2021 | Metronomy | Posse EP Volume 1 |
| "Play Pretend" | 2022 | Mac Wetha | Mac Wetha & Friends 2 |
| "CRUSH" | 2022 | Luke Wild | CRUSH |
| "Cockpit" | 2023 | Billy Lemos, binki, Harve | Control Freak |
| "Lauren" | 2023 | Yot Club | non-album single |
| "Chip Away" | 2024 | Billy Lemos | TBA |
| "Ca$h Out" | 2026 | Gus Dapperton | 4 Dear Life |
