= Getting No Sleep =

Single by Tinashe

from the album Quantum Baby
- Released: June 28, 2024
- Studio: Tinashe Music (Los Angeles)
- Genre: Electro-pop
- Length: 3:12
- Label: Tinashe Music; Nice Life
- Songwriters: Tinashe Kachingwe; Jason W. Chung; William Lemos
- Producers: Nosaj Thing; Billy Lemos

Tinashe singles chronology
| "Nasty" (2024) | "Getting No Sleep" (2024) | "No Broke Boys" (2024) |

Music video
- "Getting No Sleep" on YouTube

"Getting No Sleep" is a song by American singer-songwriter Tinashe. It was released on June 28, 2024, as the second single from her seventh studio album, Quantum Baby (2024). Serving as the follow-up to her viral hit "Nasty", the song marks Tinashe's continued exploration of her cult R&B and electronic pop fusion.

Upon release, it was accompanied by a music video and met with positive critical reception, with reviewers praising its euphoric sound, sensual themes, and Nosaj Thing's introspective production. The song was further highlighted in several music publications, including Uproxx, which selected it for its weekly Best New Pop roundup.

== Background and release ==
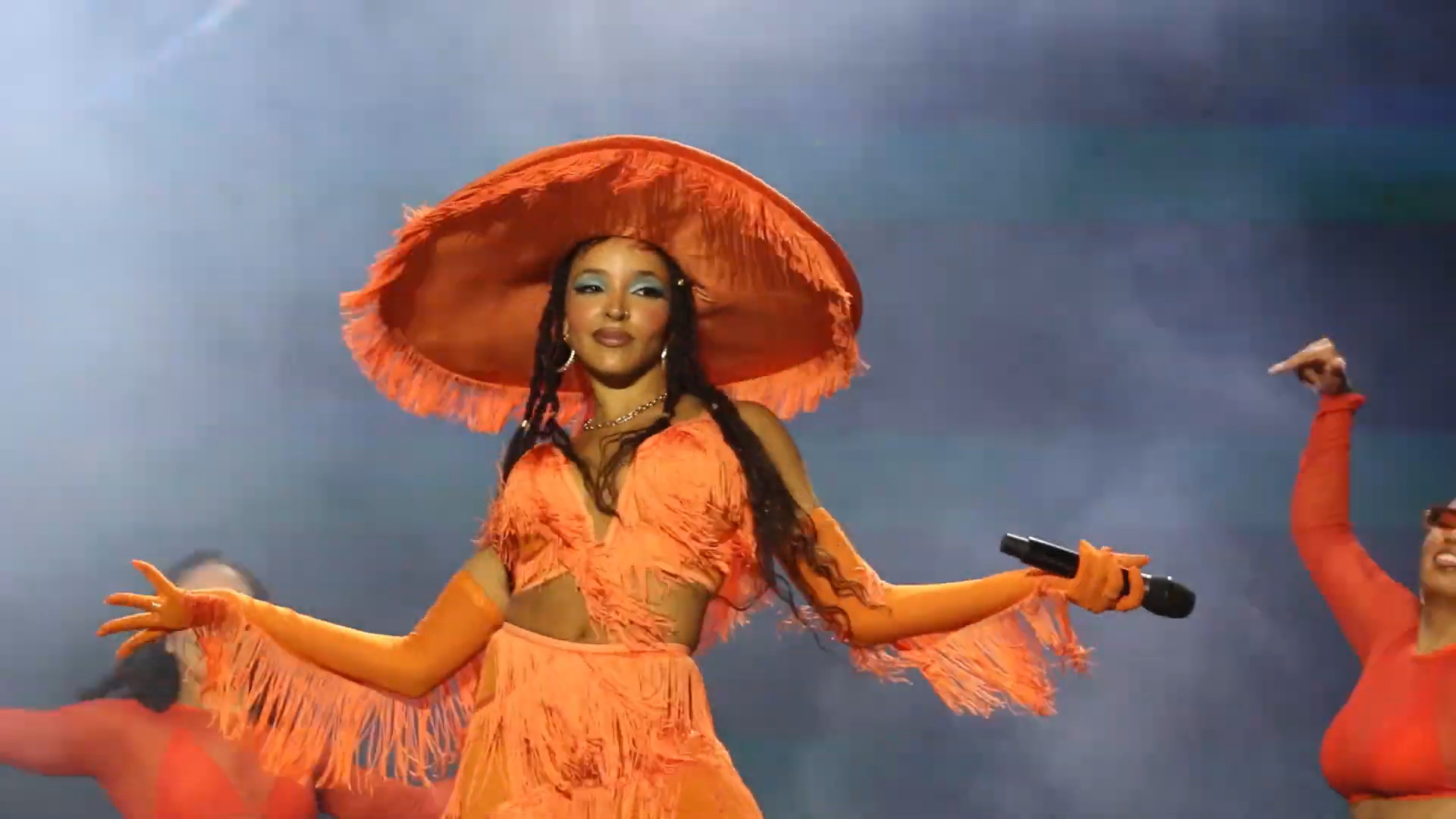
Tinashe performing in 2023

"Getting No Sleep" was co-written with producers Nosaj Thing, who previously collaborated with Tinashe on her 2023 single "Talk to Me Nice", and Billy Lemos. The track was released alongside its accompanying music video that premiered simultaneously, as follow-up to the previous single, "Nasty". (Note: Attributed to multiple sources) Upon announcing the single, Tinashe also confirmed that her forthcoming album Quantum Baby would be released on August 16. (Note: Attributed to multiple sources)

== Composition ==
"Getting No Sleep"
A 13-second sample of "Getting No Sleep". It showcases the song's sensual tone and the shimmering vocal performance emphasized in its Mad Max-themed music video.

"Getting No Sleep" has been described as a "euphoric" track and "a superb ode to a lost sex weekend". Much like her previous single "Nasty", the song is also noted for channeling "sensuality and empowerment through reclaiming sexuality for oneself". It has further been characterized as "the most emblematic" example of Tinashe's cult R&B aesthetic, combining "electronic pop, with R&B attitude and a shuffle of drum'n'bass". It further carries "mid-tempo beat" and what reviewers called a "bass-heavy, airy R&B" sensibility that evokes classic Tinashe, positioning the song as a fitting successor to "Nasty". Depicting Tinashe becoming absorbed in the allure of a man over a hypnotic beat, the song lets minutes stretch into hours as the two stay awake through the night. While Tinashe is typically known for her "clear, breathy falsetto", she instead delivers her lines in a flirty sing-talk—"Head to toe in Versace, yeah / Take you back to the lobby, yeah". According to Rolling Stone, Tinashe "holds court over fierce drum-and-bass beats" accented by "spikes of abrasive disco strings".

== Music video ==
The music video for "Getting No Sleep", released with a photosensitivity warning, continues the Terminator and Mad Max imagery that has defined Tinashe's current album rollout. It follows Tinashe as she drives to "a bar far on the outskirts of the city" to meet a double of herself, whom she is seen kissing. Much of the footage appears under "a heat sensor", paired with alternating camera perspectives that create a sense of being watched. The video ends with "a UFO light structure flying in the sky", a moment interpreted as possible foreshadowing for future songs.

== Critical reception ==
"Getting No Sleep" received positive notices from critics. Kiana Mickles from Resident Advisor highlighted Nosaj Thing's "introspective downtempo" production, noting that it gives the track "a similarly melancholic bounce". Kyann-Sian Williams of NME likewise praised the track. He described it as an understated electro-pop moment that returns to her escapist sensibilities. Williams also called the song "a sleek ode to nocturnal escapades". Variety's Thania Garcia also wrote that "Getting No Sleep" arrived with a stylized, Mad Max-themed visual that allows both the song's provocative lyrics — "How does it feel to be fuckin' with me?" — and Tinashe's "buttery vocals" to take focus. HotNewHipHop writer Elias Andrews added that rather than doubling down on the aggression of "Nasty", Tinashe instead pivots into "a more chill direction". Andrews characterized "Getting No Sleep" as a "slower, subtler sequel", and emphasized that this shift "isn't a bad thing". Additionally, Slant Magazine's Nick Seip observed that "Getting No Sleep" is "effortlessly cool" in its low-key presentation. The song earned recognition in Uproxx's weekly roundup, All The Best New Pop Music, on July 2, 2024.

== Track listing ==
Digital download

1. "Getting No Sleep" – 3:12
2. "Nasty" – 2:57

== Personnel ==
Credits were adapted from Tidal.

Recording locations

- Tinashe Music; Los Angeles

Musicians and technical

- Tinashe Kachingwe – vocals, songwriting
- Jason W. Chung – songwriting
- William Lemos – songwriting, producer
- Chris Gehringer at Sterling Sound – mastering
- Ike Schultz – mixing, vocal producer
- Ricky Reed – additional producer

== Release history ==
Release dates and formats
| Region | Date | Format(s) | Label | Ref. |
|---|---|---|---|---|
| Various | June 28, 2024 | Digital download; streaming | Tinashe Music Inc.; Nice Life | |
