= Legwurk =

Canadian musician

Tani Kahn
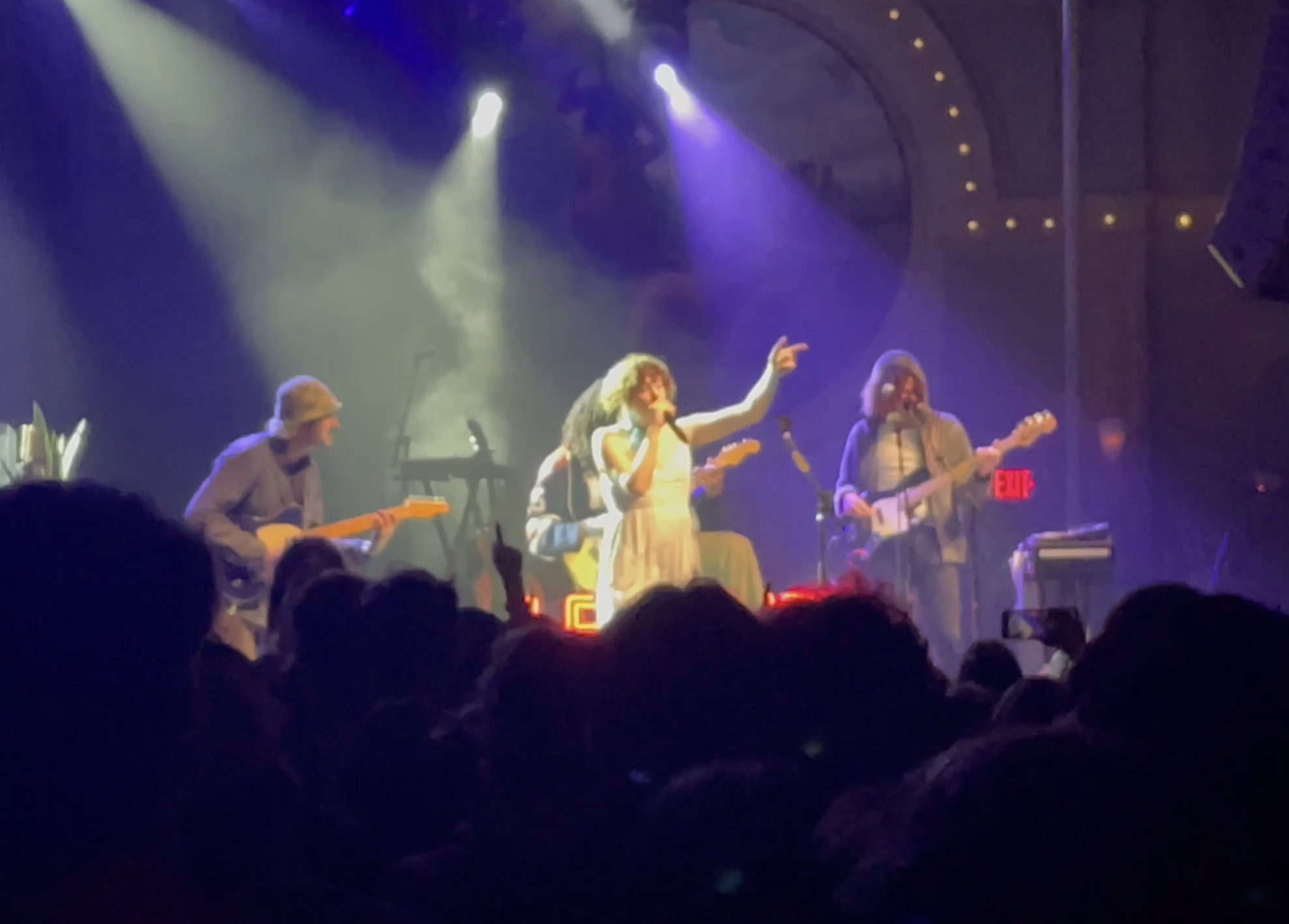
- Legwurk opening for Still Woozy on the If This Isn't Nice, I Don't Know What Is tour on March 1st
- Education: University of California, Santa Cruz
- Occupations: Musician; singer; songwriter
- Years active: 2020–present

Tani Kahn, known professionally as Legwurk, is an American singer, guitarist, bassist, key player, producer, and songwriter living in Brooklyn, NY. She has been playing guitar, bass, and keys in Still Woozy's band on their recent tours. Her music has been categorized as indie pop, synth-pop, dance-pop, bedroom pop, and chillwave. Legwurk began releasing solo music in 2020, but she has been writing songs since she was 12. She is an openly queer woman.

== Career ==
Kahn began playing music and writing music when she was young, teaching herself guitar. She also studied music at University of California, Santa Cruz where she met Still Woozy. Prior to her involvement in the indie pop scene, Legwurk had made some folk music. The project of Legwurk began when she wanted to make music that was more palatable and relatable for a general audience.

For a few years before the COVID-19 pandemic, Kahn was touring with Still Woozy as an opener as well as playing guitar, bass, and keys for the band. Legwurk started to release her own singles in 2020 after the COVID-19 pandemic hit, and Still Woozy was no longer touring. Her first single "Home" came out May 7, 2020. She self-released her debut EP I Have a Bad Memory in June 2022. Legwurk produced and wrote each song on the EP. She has stated that creating the EP was like therapy for her, and she produces music from her own home. Legwurk toured with Still Woozy throughout 2022 which included playing Coachella. She also played some solo shows in 2022 across the U.S.

== Personal life ==
Legwurk lived in many different places while she was growing up and now lives in Portland, Oregon. Her sister Amiya Kahn-Tietz is married to the musician Still Woozy.

== Discography ==
=== Extended plays ===
Title	EP details
I Have a Bad Memory	Released: June 22, 2022; Label: Self-released; Format: Digital download, streaming

=== Singles ===
Title	Year	Album
"Home"	2020	non-album single
"Favor"	2020	non-album single
"Waiting on Me"	2020	non-album single
"Missing"	2020	non-album single
"Dusty"	2020	non-album single
"This and That"	2021	non-album single
"Tatiana"	2021	I Have a Bad Memory
"Big"	2021	non-album single
"Night Gown"	2022	I Have a Bad Memory
"Sour Pk"	2022	I Have a Bad Memory
"Panic"	2022	I Have a Bad Memory
