= Matilda Mann =

British musician (born 2000)

- Born: 23 February 2000 (age 26)
- Occupation: Singer-songwriter
- Years active: 2019–present
- Musical career
- Origin: Shepherd's Bush, London, England
- Genre: Indie folk
- Instruments: Vocals; guitar
- Labels: sevenfoursevensix; Arista
- Website: matildamann.com

Matilda Mann (born 23 February 2000) is an English indie folk musician from West London. She has released four EPs: If That Makes Sense (2019), Because I Wanted You to Know (2020), Sonder (2021) and You Look Like You Can't Swim (2023). In early 2025, she released her debut LP, Roxwell.

== Early life ==
Mann spent her early childhood near Shepherd's Bush. She attended the BRIT School for sixth form.

== Career ==
Mann released her first EP in 2019 titled If That Makes Sense. The EP led her to open for some notable musicians including Arlo Parks, Beabadoobee, and The Staves.

In September 2020, Mann released a new song titled "Happy Anniversary, Stranger", the first released from Mann's then upcoming EP. The EP, titled Because I Wanted You To Know, was released in November 2020. In 2021, Mann released her third EP titled Sonder. Mann released the song "Doomsday" in April 2021.

In February 2022, Mann released a new song titled "Four Leaf Dream". Mann released another new song in April 2022 titled "Nice". Her most recent extended release was the EP You Look Like You Can't Swim in July 2023. In December 2023, Mann released "Make it Home" a Christmas-themed single. She also sings harmony vocals on The Bombay Bicycle Club's single "Fantasneeze", released in January 2024, and appears in the song's acoustic music video.

In May 2024, it was announced that Mann would be the special guest for Wallows' Model World Tour's Europe/UK leg. In July, Mann released two new singles, "Meet Cute" and "Tell Me That I'm Wrong." The music video for "Meet Cute" premiered on 24 July 2024. In the autumn, she served as the opening act for Role Model's No Place Like Tour World Tour in the UK.

In September 2024, Mann announced her debut album Roxwell set for release on 28 February 2025. In the lead up to the album, she released the singles "Say It Back", "Everything I'm Not", "Dazed & Confused", "Just Because" and "Girls". "Everything I'm Not" featured in the video game Life is Strange: Double Exposure. In addition, she recorded a cover of "There Will Never Be Another You" for the 2025 tribute album Chet Baker Re:imagined. In November 2024, Mann announced her first headline tour titled Roxwell Tour, covering the UK and Europe in 2025. "Roxwell" received overwhelmingly positive reviews, with critics calling it "a stunning showcase of her folk-pop sensibilities" and noting that "A mixture of contemplative and emotional lyrics with witty and sarcastic ones throughout the album firmly establishes Mann as one of the UK’s most promising singer-songwriters."

== Artistry ==
While she was growing up, Mann's father would play the Beatles, David Bowie, Earth Wind and Fire, and Joni Mitchell in the household. She listened to soundtracks to films such as Juno from a young age, as well as the likes of Avril Lavigne, Corinne Bailey Rae, Lianne La Havas, and Adele. Mann named Laura Marling one of her biggest influences when getting into singing and songwriting. "Happy Anniversary, Stranger" was written with Matt Maltese, and Mann considered Big Thief an influence on her debut EP. She also cited an admiration for contemporaries Laufey, Hope Tala, and Olivia Dean.

== Discography ==
=== Studio albums ===
Title	Details	Ref.
Roxwell	Released: 28 February 2025; Label: sevenfoursevensix	
Kismet	Released: 4 September 2026; Label: Self-released	

=== Extended plays ===
Title	Details	Ref.
October 16th	Released: 23 October 2018; Label: Self-released	
If That Makes Sense	Released: 12 February 2020; Label: sevenfoursevensix	
Because I Wanted You to Know	Released: 20 November 2020; Label: sevenfoursevensix	
Sonder	Released: 24 September 2021; Label: Arista	
You Look Like You Can't Swim	Released: 14 July 2023; Label: Arista	

=== Singles ===
Year	Title	Album	Ref.
2021	"Doomsday"	Sonder	
2021	"My Point of You"	Sonder	
2021	"Bloom"	Sonder	
2021	"February"	Sonder	
2021	"Stranger (for now)"	Sonder	
2021	"God Only Knows"	Non-album singles	
2022	"Four Leaf Dream"	Non-album singles	
2022	"Nice"	Non-album singles	
2022	"Hell"	Non-album singles	
2022	"Margaux"	You Look Like You Can't Swim	
2023	"Borderline Insane" (with spill tab)	Non-album single	
2023	"The Day That I Met You"	You Look Like You Can't Swim	
2023	"In Plain Sight"	You Look Like You Can't Swim	
2023	"Make It Home"	Non-album single	
2024	"Meet Cute"	Roxwell	
2024	"Tell Me That I'm Wrong"	Roxwell	
2024	"Say It Back"	Roxwell	
2024	"Everything I'm Not"	Roxwell	
2024	"Dazed & Confused"	Roxwell	
2025	"Just Because"	Roxwell	
2025	"Girls"	Roxwell	
2025	"See You Later"	Roxwell	
2025	"Inventing"	Kismet	
2026	"Bittersweet"	Kismet	
2026	"The Fig Tree"	Kismet	
2026	"Make Up"	Kismet	
2026	"After The Love"	Kismet	
2026	"Haunt Me"	Kismet	
