= Billy Lemos =

American music producer

- Born: William Lemos; October 13, 1998 (age 27); Cedar Rapids, Iowa, U.S.
- Occupation: Record producer
- Years active: 2017–present
- Website: billylemos.com

William Lemos (born October 13, 1998) is an American record producer and songwriter known for his genre-blending sound and collaborations with artists in the indie pop scene. Born in Cedar Rapids, Iowa, his early work was created in his dorm room using FL Studio, Maschine, and a guitar.

== Career and musical style ==
Lemos emerged in the late 2010s with a distinctive sound that blends elements of bedroom pop, indie rock, hip hop, and experimental electronic music. His breakout came through collaborations with artists such as Omar Apollo, Victor Internet, Still Woozy, and Jackie Hayes.

His production style has been described as “kaleidoscopic” and “genre-agnostic,” weaving together lush synth textures, off-kilter drum programming, and layered vocal arrangements. In addition to his solo work, Lemos has contributed production and songwriting to songs by SZA, Bon Iver, Tinashe, Lexa Gates, Paris Texas, Kenny Mason, The Underachievers, and Chloe George.

== Discography ==
Title	Release date	Format	Notable Collaborators
Self	October 13, 2017	EP	Omar Apollo
Awkward	September 11, 2018	EP	Ralph Castelli
Wonder	September 25, 2020	Album	Still Woozy, Monsune, Lava La Rue
Control Freak	February 24, 2023	EP	binki, spill tab, Dua Saleh

== Select songwriting and production discography ==
Year	Artist	Album/Project	Song(s)	Credit
2026	Dua Saleh	Of Earth & Wires	"5 Days", "B re a t h e", "Flood (feat. Bon Iver)", "Cállate", "Firestorm", "I Do, I Do", "Keep Away (feat. Bon Iver)", "Glow (feat. Bon Iver)", "Speed Up", "Anemic (feat. Gaidaa)", "ALL IS LOVE (feat. Aja Monet)"	Executive Producer, Writer
2026	Lexa Gates	I Am	"Ight", "Last Day", "Change", "Nothing To Worry About", "You Don’t Give A Fuck About Me"	Producer, Writer
2025	Paris Texas	They Left Me with the Gun	"Superstar", "Twin Geeker", "Stripper Song", "mudbone", "H A L O", "No Strings"	Producer, Co-producer, Writer
2025	Paris Texas	They Left Me with the Sword	"Dogma 25", "Red Eyes & Blue Hearts", "infinyte", "El Camino"	Producer, Co-producer, Writer
2024	SZA	Lana	"Drive"	Co-Producer, Writer
2024	Noah Guy	IT MUST BE LOVE	"LET U LEAD"	Producer, Writer
2024	Lexa Gates	Elite Vessel	"Yourself", "I Just Can’t Be Alone"	Producer, Writer
2024	Jackie Hayes	Creature of Habit	"Beauty", "Creature of Habit", "This Might Kill Me", "Break"	Co-Producer, writer
2024	The Underachievers	Non-album single	"Megatron"	Producer
2024	Tinashe	Quantum Baby	"Getting No Sleep"	Co-Producer, writer
2024	Kenny Mason, Paris Texas	Pigeons & Planes presents: See You Next Year 2	"Big Bank"	Co-Producer, Writer
2024	skaiwater	Pigeons & Planes presents: See You Next Year 2	"New Slaves"	Co-Producer, Writer
2024	binki	Pigeons & Planes presents: See You Next Year 2	"Bunches"	Producer, Writer
2024	Jackie Hayes	Mundane Pleasure	"Bandaid"	Co-Producer, Writer
2024	Chloe George	A Cheetah Hunting In Slow Motion	"Outward", "Old Ways", "Glad You Came", "Outward (Interlude)", "Losing You", "Somebody Else, "My Nature	Producer, Writer
2023	Panchiko	Failed at Math(s) (Billy Lemos Remix)	"Satisfied (Billy Lemos Remix)"	Remixer
2023	Paris Texas	MID AIR	"tenTHIRTYseven"	Additional production, Writer
2023	Sam Austins	Boy Toy	"Pretend Friend"	Producer, Writer
2022	Miya Folick	Cartoon Clouds (Billy Lemos Remix)	"Cartoon Clouds (Billy Lemos Remix)"	Remixer
2022	Jackie Hayes	Over & Over	"Intro", "Bite Me", "Focus", "Best of It", "Last Second", "So What", "Wish It Was", "August", "Got to Hurt", "Hard to Believe"	Co-Producer, Writer
2022	Tobi Lou	Meaningless	"Non-Perishable"	Additional production
2021	Rostam	Changephobia Remixes: Part I	"From the Back of a Cab (Billy Lemos Remix)"	Remixer
2021	Jackie Hayes	There's Always Going To Be Something	"omg", "brand new", "have fun", "material", "sunday"	Co-Producer, Writer
2021	George Alice	Teenager (Recess Remixes)	"Teenager (Billy Lemos Remix)"	Remixer
2020	Overcoats	The Fight (Remixed)	"Keep The Faith (Billy Lemos Remix)"	Remixer
2020	Jackie Hayes	take it, leave it	"headache", "enemy", "belong", "dead of winter"	Co-Producer, Writer
