= Juno (album) =

Studio album by Remi Wolf
- Released: October 15, 2021
- Length: 39:52
- Label: Island
- Producers: Solomonophonic; Remi Wolf; Elie Jay Rizk; Y2K; Kenny Beats; John Carroll Kirby; Aidan Rodriguez; M-Phazes; Rory Noble; Ethan Gruska; Rostam Batmanglij; John DeBold; Internet Money; Cautious Clay; Jack DeMeo; Porches

Remi Wolf chronology
We Love Dogs! (2021)	Juno (2021)	Big Ideas (2024)

Singles from Juno
- 1. "Liquor Store" Released: July 20, 2021; 2. "Quiet On Set" / "Grumpy Old Man" Released: August 18, 2021; 3. "Guerrilla" / "Sexy Villain" Released: September 8, 2021; 4. "Anthony Kiedis" / "Front Tooth" Released: September 29, 2021

Juno is the debut studio album by American singer and songwriter Remi Wolf, released on October 15, 2021, through Island Records.

== Critical reception ==
Professional ratings
Aggregate scores
Source	Rating
Metacritic	85/100
Review scores
Source	Rating
Clash	8/10
DIY	4/5 stars
Dork	5/5 stars
Exclaim!	8/10
Gigwise	4/5 stars
The Line of Best Fit	9/10
NME	4/5 stars
The Observer	4/5 stars
Pitchfork	7.0/10
PopMatters	9/10

Juno received critical acclaim from music critics. At Metacritic, which assigns a normalised rating out of 100 to reviews from mainstream critics, the album has an average score of 85 out of 100, based on twelve reviews.

== Track listing ==
Juno track listing
No.	Title	Writer(s)	Producer(s)	Length
1.	"Liquor Store"	Remi Wolf; Jared Solomon	Solomonophonic; Wolf	2:53
2.	"Anthony Kiedis"	Wolf; Solomon	Solomonophonic; Wolf	2:52
3.	"Wyd"	Wolf; Solomon	Solomonophonic; Wolf	3:20
4.	"Guerrilla"	Wolf; Solomon; Jacob Sullenger	Solomonophonic; Wolf	2:45
5.	"Quiet On Set"	Wolf; Solomon; Elie Jay Rizk	Solomonophonic; Wolf; Rizk	3:16
6.	"Volkiano"	Wolf; Solomon; Ari Starace	Solomonophonic; Wolf; Y2K	3:36
7.	"Front Tooth"	Wolf; Solomon; Kenneth Blume III	Solomonophonic; Wolf; Kenny Beats	2:46
8.	"Grumpy Old Man"	Wolf; Solomon; Elias McDaniel	Solomonophonic; Wolf	3:32
9.	"Buttermilk"	Wolf; Solomon	Solomonophonic; Wolf; John Carroll Kirby	2:18
10.	"Sally"	Wolf; Solomon; Julian McClanahan	Solomonophonic; Wolf	2:44
11.	"Sexy Villain"	Wolf; Solomon; Olivia Waithe; Mary Weitz; Mark Landon	Solomonophonic; Wolf; Aidan Rodriguez; M-Phazes	3:09
12.	"Buzz Me In"	Wolf; Waithe; Weitz; Landon	Rory Noble; Wolf; M-Phazes	2:47
13.	"Street You Live On"	Wolf; Ethan Gruska	Solomonophonic; Wolf; Gruska	2:56
Total length:				39:52

Juno (Deluxe) track listing
No.	Title	Writer(s)	Producer(s)	Length
1.	"Fired"	Wolf; Rostam Batmanglij	Batmanglij; Wolf	3:18
2.	"Cake"	Wolf; Solomon; Victoria Walker; John DeBold; Nicholas Mira; Harry Mathews	Wolf; Solomonophonic; DeBold; Internet Money	2:48
3.	"Liz"	Wolf; Solomon	Solomonophonic; Wolf	2:56
4.	"Michael"	Wolf; Jack DeMeo; Aaron Maine	Solomonophonic; Wolf; DeMeo; Porches	2:46
5.	"Sugar"	Wolf; Joshua Karpeh	Solomonophonic; Wolf; Cautious Clay	3:17
6.	"Liquor Store"	Wolf; Solomon	Solomonophonic; Wolf	2:53
7.	"Anthony Kiedis"	Wolf; Solomon	Solomonophonic; Wolf	2:52
8.	"Wyd"	Wolf; Solomon	Solomonophonic; Wolf	3:20
9.	"Guerrilla"	Wolf; Solomon; Sullenger	Solomonophonic; Wolf	2:45
10.	"Quiet On Set"	Wolf; Solomon; Rizk	Solomonophonic; Wolf; Rizk	3:16
11.	"Volkiano"	Wolf; Solomon; Starace	Solomonophonic; Wolf; Y2K	3:36
12.	"Front Tooth"	Wolf; Solomon; Blume	Solomonophonic; Wolf; Kenny Beats	2:46
13.	"Grumpy Old Man"	Wolf; Solomon; McDaniel	Solomonophonic; Wolf	3:32
14.	"Buttermilk"	Wolf; Solomon	Solomonophonic; Wolf; Kirby	2:18
15.	"Sally"	Wolf; Solomon; McClanahan	Solomonophonic; Wolf	2:44
16.	"Sexy Villain"	Wolf; Solomon; Waithe; Weitz; Landon	Solomonophonic; Wolf; Rodriguez; M-Phazes	3:09
17.	"Buzz Me In"	Wolf; Waithe; Weitz; Landon	Noble; Wolf; M-Phazes	2:47
18.	"Street You Live On"	Wolf; Gruska	Solomonophonic; Wolf; Gruska	3:34
19.	"Street You Live On" (live)	Wolf; Gruska	Wolf	3:38
Total length:				54:57

== Charts ==
Chart (2021)	Peak position
US Heatseekers Albums (Billboard)	16
