= Nashville School of the Arts =

Location
- 1250 Foster Avenue; Nashville, Tennessee 37210; United States; 36.132027°N 86.739411°W

Information
- Type: Magnet high school
- Motto: Scholar, Artist, Individual
- Established: 1993
- Principal: Justin Thomas
- Teaching staff: 33.53 (FTE)
- Grades: 9 - 12
- Enrollment: 569 (2023-2024)
- Student to teacher ratio: 16.97
- Colors: Carolina blue and black
- Team name: Mustangs
- Website: https://nsa.mnps.org/

Nashville School of the Arts (NSA) is a public magnet high school including grades 9–12 for arts-interested students located in Nashville, Tennessee. Each student enrolls in one or more of the nine conservatories within the school; dance, theatre arts, literary arts, visual arts, and music (including choral arts, band, orchestra, guitar, and piano). Students must audition, interview, or write an essay to be accepted. There is no lottery admission to NSA.

Students are expected to study in their respective arts and simultaneously complete the same academic curriculum as all other Metropolitan Nashville Public School students. While the school focuses on the arts, their academic scores rank among the top four in the MNPS school system, and Tennessee Comprehensive Assessment Program scores are above the Davidson County average.

== History ==
Nashville School of the Arts began as a small magnet program for arts-interested students in Pearl-Cohn High School in 1993. As time went on, NSA grew to a size warranting its own facility, which was achieved in 1996 on the former Cumberland School campus. NSA eventually moved to the Tennessee Preparatory School campus southeast of downtown Nashville where they are currently located. The school has established pencil partners, which is a business or other community organization that teams up with a Nashville school to volunteer time and donate resources that promote student success, as well as community partners (including Youth Villages, the Nashville Shakespeare Festival, and PG-13 players).

== Newspaper ==
Backstage is NSA's student-run newspaper. In 2010, the publication began a web-based format. Stories are added constantly, complete with upcoming NSA events, reviews, scheduled activities, and anything that is of interest to the student body.

In 2024, NSA film students began Centerstage: a comparable web series that includes, skits, interviews, and footage of school events.

== Notable alumni ==
- Natalia Dyer, actress
- Melanie Faye, musician (guitarist)
- Sophie Allison, singer-songwriter professionally known as Soccer Mommy

== Principals ==
- Dr. Justin Thomas (2022–)
- Dr. Gregory Stewart (2012–2022)
- Bob Wilson (2001–2012)
- Dr. Elbert Ross (1998–2001)
- Robert Churchwell (1997–1998)

== Dean of students ==
- Dr. Bryan Gwyn (2017–2018)
- Matthew Kilkenny (2015–2017)
- Randi Staggs (2014–2015)

== Assistant principals ==
- Dr. Iris Colette Barbour (2018–present)
- Dr. Randi Staggs (2015–present)
- Oceana Sheehan
- Tonja L. Williams
- Lendozia Edwards
- Mary Nollner
