= This Ain't No Picnic (music festival) =

This Ain't No Picnic is an American multi-genre music festival organized by Goldenvoice which began in 1999. The first three editions of the festival were held at the Oak Canyon Ranch in Irvine, California, and the most recent edition was held at the Brookside Golf Course. The festival was named after the song "This Ain't No Picnic" by the San Pedro band The Minutemen off their acclaimed 1984 album Double Nickels on The Dime.

== History ==
The festival began in the year 1999. The second edition occurred in 2000. The festival was originally intended to be annual, however, due to its proximity to Coachella, that did not happen. In 2002, the third edition of the festival was held. After a 20-year hiatus, the festival returned in 2022.

== Lineups ==
=== 1999 ===
- At the Drive-In
- Boredoms
- Guided by Voices
- Hovercraft
- Looper
- Mike Watt
- Rocket from the Crypt
- Scarnella
- Sleater-Kinney
- Sonic Youth
- Sunny Day Real Estate
- Superchunk
- The Apples In Stereo
- The Get Up Kids
- The Killingtons
- The Promise Ring
- Will Oldham

=== 2000 ===
- At the Drive-In
- Beck
- Beachwood Sparks
- Blue Man Group
- Built to Spill
- Creeper Lagoon
- Grandaddy
- Guided by Voices
- Mike Watt
- Modest Mouse
- Shannon Wright
- Tristeza
- Yo La Tengo

=== 2002 ===
- Blonde Redhead
- El-P
- Guided By Voices
- Har Mar Superstar
- Jimmy Eat World
- The Kinison
- Les Savy Fav
- Moving Units
- Pinback
- Recover
- Reuben's Accomplice
- The Donnas
- The Mars Volta
- The Von Bondies
- Wagner
- Your Enemies Friends
- Z-Trip

=== 2022 ===
Saturday, August 27
Fairway	Back Nine	Greens	The 19th Hole
LCD Soundsystem; Le Tigre; Kaytranada; Isaiah Rashad; Courtney Barnett; Yves Tumor; Julia Jacklin; Genesis Owusu; Indigo De Souza; Dawn Richard; Tre' Amani	Jorja Smith; Jungle; Mac DeMarco; Earl Sweatshirt; Ying Yang Twins; Queen Naija; Enjoy; Lala Lala; Isabella Lovestory	Kelly Lee Owens; Circle Jerks; Magdalena Bay; Ethel Cain; Eyedress; Godford; Arooj Aftab; Hana Vu	Honey Dijon; Gerd Janson; Danilo Plessow (MCDE); Palms Trax; Leon Vynehall; Peach; Maral; Dave P
Sunday, August 28
The Strokes; Phoebe Bridgers; Idles; Slowthai; Wet Leg; Mdou Moctar; Nicki Nicole; Girl Ultra; Spellling; Margaritas Podridas; Brandon	Beach House; Turnstile; Caroline Polachek; Tinashe; Paris Texas; Pachyman; Mike Watt + The Missingmen; Junior Varsity; They Hate Change	Godspeed You! Black Emperor; Descendents; Sparks; Deafheaven; Shame; Nothing; King Woman; Michelle; Zulu	Four Tet + Floating Points; Avalon Emerson; TSHA; Romy; Sofia Kourtesis; Naafi; Fundido
