= Mud (Remi Wolf album) =

Studio album by Remi Wolf
- Released: October 9, 2026
- Recorded: November 2024 – 2026
- Studios: Electric Lady (New York); Coronado Corner (Los Angeles); Chaplin (Hollywood)
- Genre: Indie rock
- Length: 43:52
- Label: Island
- Producers: Josh Conway; Jack DeMeo; Greg Kurstin; Jamie McLaughlin; Solomonophonic; Remi Wolf

Remi Wolf chronology
Big Ideas (2024)	Mud (2026)

Singles from Mud
- 1. "Twiggy" Released: July 31, 2026; 2. "Bottle" Released: August 20, 2026; 3. "I Won't Cry" Released: September 25, 2026

Mud is the third studio album by the American singer and songwriter Remi Wolf, released on October 9, 2026, through Island Records. It received positive reviews from critics and became her highest-charting album on the US Billboard 200, debuting at number 18. The album is primarily indie rock with influences of alternative pop, country pop, and R&B.

== Background and development ==
Writing for Mud began in November 2024, while Wolf was touring for her previous project, Big Ideas. Wolf described both feeling burned out and processing the end of a relationship, which resulted in her going to a retreat in Nashville, where she came up with the initial concept for Mud.

Writing for the project was done in conjunction with close collaborators Jared Solomon, Jack DeMeo, and Gigi Grombacher while staying at a log cabin near Big Bear Lake.

The songs "Bottle" and "Covered in Mud" were recorded at Electric Lady Studios in New York City.

Additional work on the project was completed while camping at Joshua Tree National Park.

== Critical reception ==
Professional ratings
Aggregate scores
Source	Rating
Metacritic	75/100
Review scores
Source	Rating
AllMusic	3.5/5 stars
Exclaim!	8/10
NME	3.5/5 stars
Paste	B
Pitchfork	7.3/10

Mud received a score of 75 out of 100 on review aggregator Metacritic based on five critics' reviews, which the website categorized as "generally favorable" reception. Alex Hudson of Exclaim! commented on the album's themes of "romance, hedonism and addiction", writing "Sadness and desperation persist at a low-level hum in the background of every song even though, on its surface, Mud is fun as hell." NME's Hollie Geraghty described the project's "emotional awareness" as its "spark", and praised Remi's vocal performance. While they were underwhelmed by certain tracks, they wrote "Mud will no doubt resonate with anyone who’s experienced a few scrapes and bumps in their twenties."

== Track listing ==
Mud track listing
No.	Title	Writer(s)	Producer(s)	Length
1.	"Bottle"	Remi Wolf; Jack DeMeo; Jared Solomon; Josh Conway; Leon Michels; Gigi Grombacher	Wolf; Solomonophonic; Demeo; Michels^{[a]}; Conway^{[a]}	4:18
2.	"Champagne"	Wolf; Jamie McLaughlin; Hank Compton; Grady Block; DeMeo; Solomon	Wolf; Solomonophonic; McLaughlin; DeMeo	3:30
3.	"Twiggy"	Wolf; DeMeo; McLaughlin; Solomon; Paul Daniel Cherewick	Wolf; Solomonophonic; DeMeo; Paul Cherry^{[a]}	3:29
4.	"Burn Me Blue"	Wolf; DeMeo; McLaughlin; Grombacher; Steph Jones; Compton; Solomon; Conway	Wolf; Solomonophonic; DeMeo; McLaughlin^{[a]}	3:22
5.	"Jamie"	Wolf; DeMeo; Grombacher; Conway; Solomon	Wolf; Solomonophonic; DeMeo; Conway	5:06
6.	"Covered In Mud"	Wolf; Grombacher; DeMeo; Wolf; Solomon	Wolf; Solomonophonic; DeMeo; Conway^{[a]}	3:51
7.	"Moon So High" (featuring John Mayer)	Wolf; DeMeo; McLaughlin; Grombacher; Solomon	Wolf; Solomonophonic; DeMeo; John Mayer^{[a]}	3:46
8.	"I Won't Cry"	Wolf; DeMeo; McLaughlin; Grombacher; Solomon	Wolf; Solomonophonic; DeMeo	4:20
9.	"Wine Drunk"	Wolf; DeMeo; Grombacher; Solomon; Cherewick	Wolf; Solomonophonic; DeMeo; Paul Cherry^{[a]}; Conway^{[a]}	4:23
10.	"Guess"	Wolf; Greg Kurstin; DeMeo	Kurstin; Wolf; Solomonophonic; DeMeo	3:36
11.	"Yellow Rose"	Wolf; Conway; Solomon	Wolf; Solomonophonic; Conway	4:11
Total length:				43:52

=== Note ===
- ^{^[a]} indicates an additional producer

== Personnel ==
Credits are adapted from Remi Wolf's official website credits.

=== Musicians ===
- Remi Wolf – vocals, percussion (all tracks); background vocals (tracks 1, 5, 9), drums (9); guitar, ambience (10)
- Solomonophonic – drums (1–8), synthesizers (1–4, 7), drum machine (1, 3, 4), electric guitar (1), bass (2, 4, 6, 11), guitar (2, 5, 6, 8, 9, 11), Crumar (2), Moog (5, 6), background vocals (5, 9), organ (5), pump organ (9), ambience (10), percussion (11)
- Jack DeMeo – background vocals (1, 4, 5, 8, 9), acoustic guitar (1, 4), electric guitar (1), bass (2–5, 8–10), guitar (2, 3, 6, 8–10), banjo (2, 6, 9), synthesizers (2, 3, 8, 9); vocals, pedal steel, Moog (2); piano (3, 5, 7, 9), Rhodes (3, 5, 7), bass synthesizer (3), slide guitar (5), organ (6, 9), harmonica (6), drums (7), keyboards (8), ambience (10)
- Josh Conway – bass (1); background vocals, piano (5); percussion, drums (11), piano (11)
- Jamie McLaughlin – guitar (2, 3, 8), percussion (2), electric guitar (4), acoustic guitar (7)
- Hank Compton – guitar, bass (2)
- Paul Cherry – drums (3), background vocals (9)
- John Mayer – vocals, electric guitar (7)
- Bo Bice Wolf – dog bark (7)
- Pino Palladino – bass (7)
- Greg Kurstin – guitar, kick drum (10)
- Gabe Steiner – horns (11)
- Scott Zhang – piano (11)

=== Technical and creative ===
- Nathan Phillips – mixing
- Phil Feinman – mastering
- Lui Guimaraes – engineering
- Solomonophonic – engineering
- John Rooney – engineering (1, 5, 9)
- Remi Wolf – engineering (2–4, 7, 8, 10), art, creative direction, package design
- Jack DeMeo – engineering (2–4, 7, 8)
- Jamie McLaughlin – engineering (2)
- Dani Perez – engineering (6, 9)
- Bill Malina – engineering (7)
- Ciaran de Chaud – engineering assistance (7)
- Julian Burg – engineering (10)
- Lauren Marquez – engineering (11)
- Zachary Gray – photography
- Natalie Hewitt – photography
- Jordan Hughes – photography
- Milo Nichols – creative direction
- Jade Ehlers – package design
- Izzy Lux – package design
- Fabiana Teofan – package design

== Charts ==
Chart performance for Mud
Chart (2026)	Peak position
Australian Albums (ARIA)	20
New Zealand Albums (RMNZ)	32
Scottish Albums (Official Charts)	49
UK Albums Sales (Official Charts)	45
US Billboard 200	18
US Top Rock & Alternative Albums (Billboard)	5
