= Angie (Spill Tab album) =

Studio album by Spill Tab
- Released: May 16, 2025
- Length: 29:26
- Label: Because
- Producer: APOB; Wyatt Bernard; Austin Corona; John DeBold; Mikey Freedom Hart; John Hill; Marinelli; Risc; Solomonophonic; Spill Tab; Will Van Zandt

Spill Tab chronology
Klepto (2023)	Angie (2025)

Singles from Angie
- 1. "Pink Lemonade" Released: 20 November 2024; 2. "De Guerre" Released: 10 January 2025; 3. "Angie" Released: 20 February 2025; 4. "Assis" Released: 18 March 2025; 5. "Hold Me" Released: 23 April 2025; 6. "Athlete" Released: 12 May 2025

Angie is the debut studio album by French-American singer-songwriter Spill Tab. It was released on 16 May 2025, by Because Music.

== Background ==
The album, consisting of twelve songs, incorporates elements of bossa-funk, electroclash, R&B, jazz, new wave, and ambient folk. It was vocalized in English and French, and was co-produced by Chicha, John Hill and Solomonophonic.

The title track was released as a single on 20 February 2025, alongside a music video.

== Reception ==
Professional ratings
Review scores
Source	Rating
DIY	4/5 stars
Dork	4/5 stars
New Noise	5/5 stars
Paste	6.8/10

DIY rated the album four stars and commented, "What are on paper strange qualities also make for some of the project's most inviting moments."

Dork gave the album a rating of four out of five, described it as "emotional without being performative, clever without being smug, and consistently thrilling without ever begging for attention."

New Noise, rating it five out of five, described the album as "hard to define" and remarked, "Her music squelches, beeps, and swoons, underscoring a vocal dynamism in her own arena."

Paste assigned a rating of 6.8 out of ten and noted, "Even with its inconsistencies, Angie invites the listener in, hinting at a greatness hidden in the fuzz and motif."

== Track listing ==
Angie track listing
No.	Title	Writer(s)	Producer(s)	Length
1.	"Pink Lemonade"	Claire Chicha; John DeBold; David Marinelli; Jared Solomon	Spill Tab; DeBold; Marinelli; Solomonophonic	2:22
2.	"Adore Me"	Chicha; Marinelli	Spill Tab; Marinelli	2:39
3.	"Assis"	Chicha; John Hill; Solomon	Spill Tab; Hill; Solomonophonic	2:41
4.	"Athlete"	Chicha	Spill Tab; Solomonphonic	2:45
5.	"By Design"	Chicha; Solomon	Spill Tab; Solmonophonic	3:41
6.	"Hold Me"	Chicha; Wyatt Bernard; Austin Corona; Will Van Zandt	Spill Tab; Bernard; Corona; Van Zandt	3:10
7.	"Want Me"	Chicha; Bernard; Corona	Spill Tab; Bernard; Corona	2:01
8.	"Morning Dew Interlude"	Chicha; Marinelli	Spill Tab; Marinelli	0:40
9.	"Doesn't That Scare You?"	Chicha; Marinelli	Spill Tab; Marinelli	2:17
10.	"Angie"	Hill; Solomon	Chicha; Hill; Solomonophonic	2:48
11.	"De Guerre"	Chicha; Mikey Freedom Hart; Aaron Paul O'Brien	Spill Tab; APOB; Hart	2:35
12.	"Wet Veneer"	Chicha; Marinelli; Chris Smith	Spill Tab; Marinelli; Risc	1:47
Total length:				29:26

== Personnel ==
Credits adapted from Tidal.

- Claire Chica – lead vocals (all tracks); drums, percussion (track 1); bass guitar (2, 3, 9, 11), piano (2, 5, 10, 11), synthesizer (2, 5), guitar (8, 10)
- Ruairi O'Flaherty – mastering
- Nathan Phillips – mixing
- Jared Solomon – drum programming, drums, guitar (tracks 1, 3–5, 10); percussion (1, 3, 5), synthesizer (3–5), bass guitar (4, 5, 10)
- David Marinelli – synthesizer (tracks 1, 2, 8, 9), drum programming (1, 2, 9), piano (1), drums (2, 9); guitar, piano (2); bass guitar (9), bass drum (12)
- John DeBold – bass guitar, drum programming, percussion (track 1)
- Danny Farenbach – trumpet (tracks 2, 12), strings (8, 9)
- John Hill – synthesizer (tracks 3, 9, 10), drum programming (3, 10), drums (10)
- Jasper Harris – synthesizer (track 4)
- Austin Corona – bass guitar, guitar (tracks 6, 7); drums (6)
- Will Van Zandt – drum programming, synthesizer (tracks 6, 7); guitar, piano (6)
- Wyatt Bernard – drums (track 6)
- Mikey Ambrosino – guitar (track 9)
- Aaron Paul O'Brien – bass guitar, drum programming, drums, guitar, synthesizer (track 11)
- Mikey Freedom Hart – guitar (track 11)
- Risc – synthesizer (track 12)
