= Paris Texas (hip-hop group) =

American hip hop duo

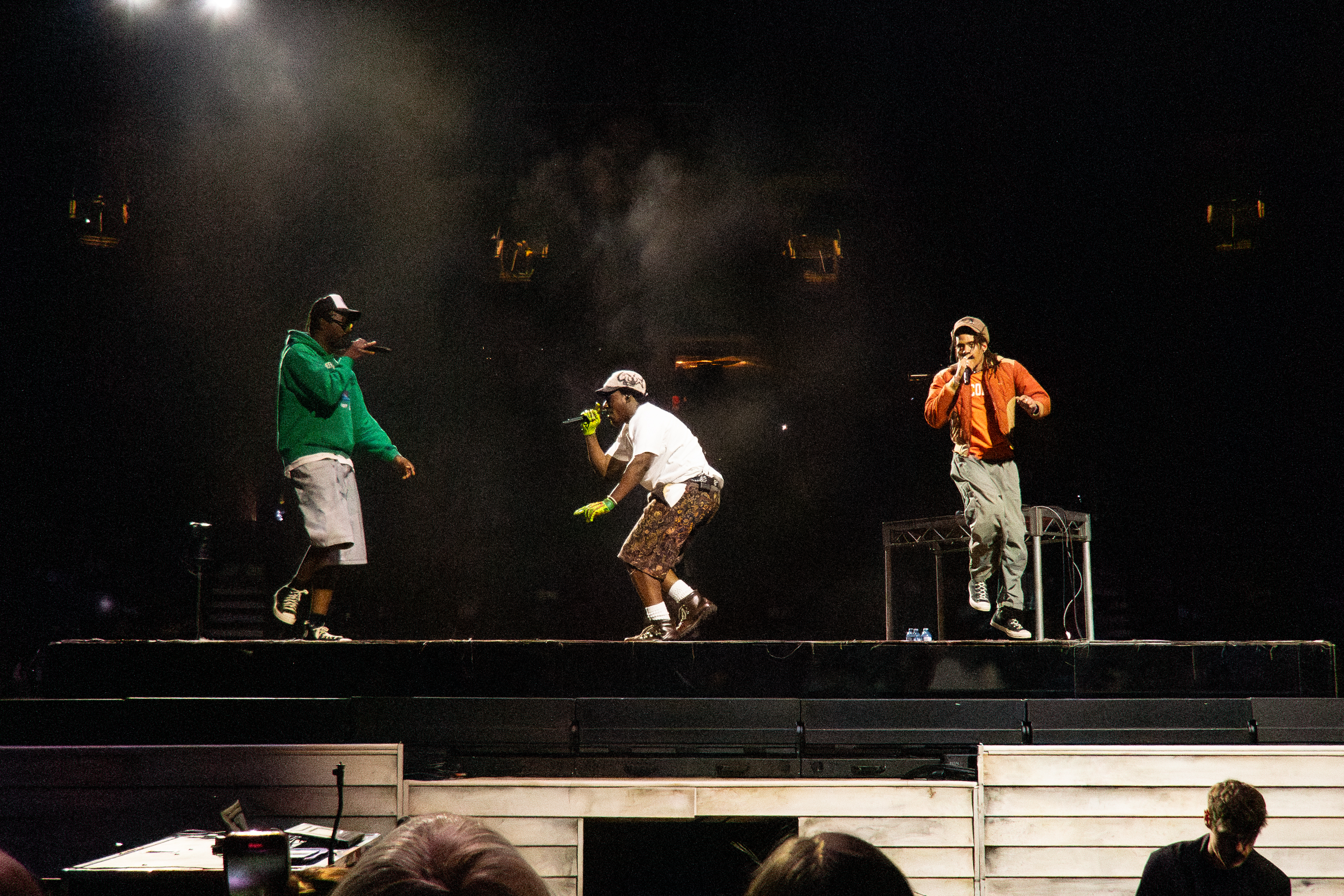
- Paris Texas (L-R: Louie Pastel, Felix, and DJ Ankle Sandwich) performing in 2025

Background information
- Origin: Los Angeles, California, U.S.
- Genres: Hip hop; alternative hip hop; punk rap; rap rock; experimental
- Years active: 2018–present
- Labels: Paris Texas LLC; The Orchard
- Members: Louie Pastel Felix
- Website: Official website

Paris Texas is an American alternative hip hop duo from Los Angeles, California, formed in 2018 by rapper-producers who perform under the pseudonyms, Louie Pastel and Felix. They operate as an independent musical act, self-publishing under their own LLC brand/label, with additional support through American distributor, The Orchard. Their name is a reference to German filmmaker, Wim Wenders' 1984 road film, Paris, Texas.

Their music has been characterized as an eclectic mix of rap and hip-hop, fused with the guitar-driven elements of alternative rock, including grunge, punk, metal, emo and new-wave, among a variety of other genres. Additionally, critics have likened the duo's output to resembling that of OutKast, King Krule, and Cities Aviv, among others, while Louie Pastel and Felix themselves have cited various artists and bands, such as N.E.R.D, The Cool Kids, RxKNephew, Say Anything, Dance Gavin Dance, Snubnose Frankenstein, and Chance the Rapper as influences to their sound.

After an extended hiatus, following the release of their first EP, I'll Get My Revenge in Hell (2018), the pair gained significant exposure leading up to the release of their debut mixtape, Boy Anonymous (2021) to critical acclaim. Since then, they have released one studio album, Mid Air (2023) and three more EP's: Red Hand Akimbo (2021) and their most recent consecutive efforts, They Left Me With The Sword and They Left Me With A Gun (2025).

Over the course of their career, Paris Texas have toured and collaborated with the likes of Teezo Touchdown, Tyler the Creator, Kenny Mason, Clairo, Kenny Beats, Lil Yachty and have performed at a series of high-profile music festivals internationally, such as Lollapalooza, Coachella, Camp Flog Gnaw, This Ain't No Picnic, Governors Ball and MS Dockville.

== History ==
=== 2013–2018: Early years, formation and I'll Get My Revenge in Hell ===
Louie Pastel and Felix met during freshman year at El Camino College in 2013, after being introduced through a mutual friend and quickly bonded over their shared love for Florida rapper, Robb Banks. "I had a French class with this kid, Jesus. Funniest dude I ever met in my life. They had been friends already through high school. I told Jesus I made beats. He was rapping and said, he has a friend who raps too", Louie Pastel recounts in an interview with Complex. The two experienced great chemistry from the start, and within a few months, they had begun making music together.

Over the next several years, the two would continue creating music together and individually in a casual capacity, including being associated with LA-based hip-hop collective, STRNGFRNDS (Strange Friends), producing and performing within the local underground music scene, under several different pseudonyms. This included “Brucemighty”, "Aye Adrian!", “Shortfinmako” and "Mako Pierre" around their South Central neighborhood and the surrounding Greater Los Angeles area. It would not be until 2018, that the pair would officially form their partnership as "Paris Texas". Soon after, they would go on to release their first project, a six-track EP, titled I'll Get My Revenge in Hell, on October 4, 2018. The project, featuring a sole guest appearance by Houston rapper, BBY Kodie. Following the EP's release, the duo remained publicly inactive over the next few years (most likely due to the COVID-19 global pandemic), while working on the next phase of the group.

=== 2019: Boy Anonymous's Original release ===
On November 16, 2019, Paris Texas released Boy Anonymous which featured only six of the eight songs on the final release. It was executively produced by fakemydeath which is another pseudonym for Louie Pastel. The duo ended up taking down the album in 2020 and giving out a free zip of the six songs as well as a "THANK U LETTER" written by Felix (credit to Chris Cross 202).

=== 2021–2022: Reemergence with Boy Anonymous, and Red Hand Akimbo ===
In 2021, Paris Texas re-emerged after partnering with music distributor, The Orchard and LA-based artist management, Good Buddy, run by Mike Ahern (best known for managing American musical artist, Clairo and previously American rapper, Chance the Rapper). Scrubbing most of their former work off of the Internet—save for I'll Get My Revenge in Hell, remaining on their SoundCloud to downplay any accusations of being industry plants, Paris Texas would reintroduce themselves by re-releasing select and updated older material to distribute onto music streaming platforms, the first of which was their debut single, "Heavy Metal" and the follow-up, "Situations", released February and March 17, 2021, respectively.

On April 14, 2021, Paris Texas unveiled a third single, "Force of Habit", alongside the announcement of their debut mixtape, Boy Anonymous, which arrived on May 14, 2021, and was praised by critics for its "unmistakable intensity and energy of intention". A series of cinematic shorts were also released in-tandem and following the project's arrival, centered around Louie Pastel and Felix (under assumed identities, Francis L. Parker and Austin Rich) employed as sanitation workers of an illicit cleaning service, "Ditch Maid". The shorts would be revealed as a part of a greater narrative when interconnected to the mixtape's music videos, further showcasing the duo's attention to detail and strong focus on visual storytelling and world-building behind their music.

A few months following the release of Boy Anonymous, Paris Texas would surprise-drop yet another single, "Girls Like Drugs", on September 22, 2021. Their second EP, Red Hand Akimbo, would soon follow on October 6, 2021, released in a similar fashion without any prior announcement beforehand, presenting an unpredictable edge to the pair and including extra co-production by American producer, Kenny Beats on the project's track, "Bullseye". The two would return the favor the following year, writing and contributing additional vocals to the songs, "Hooper" and "Hot Hand" on Beats' debut album (in tribute to his father), Louie released on August 31, 2022 via XL Recordings.

Heading into 2022, Paris Texas was scheduled as one of the support acts on American hip-hop group, BROCKHAMPTON's 2022 "Here Right Now" World Tour, along with American rappers, Jean Dawson and HVN, but plans would ultimately be scrapped, following the collective's announcement in January 2022 they had disbanded, effectively cancelling the entire tour. The duo would release a collaborative track, "Cyanide", with LA indie rock band, Cryogeyser as standalone single on July 8, 2022.

=== 2023-present: Mid Air and "They Left Me With..." EP's ===
In 2023, Paris Texas would kick-off their next release cycle with another standalone (but commercially unavailable) track, "Nada Freestyle", shared exclusively to their YouTube channel on March 23, 2023. The track served as a quasi-prologue to their next studio album. The following week, "Panic!!!", the first official single of their next project, would arrive on March 30, 2023, along with a music video directed by Bradley J. Calder and Neema Sadeghi, featuring a brief cameo by rapper, JPEGMafia.

The album's second single, "Bullet Man", would soon follow on May 12, 2023, alongside its own harrowing and Clio Award-winning music video directed by Aus Taylor, that touches on racism in America through a stylistic lens of surrealism and dark humor. On June 16, 2023, Paris Texas announced their debut full-length studio album, Mid Air, released on July 21, 2023, through the premiere of the album's third single, "Everybody’s Safe Until...". The album's final single, "DnD", featuring Atlanta rapper Kenny Mason, would arrive, a few days shy of the album's release on July 18, 2023, accompanied by two separate music videos, with one shot during the daytime, and the other at night. Upon its release, Mid Air was received favorably, based on the album receiving an average score of 84 from 5 reviews on Metacritic, indicating "universal acclaim".

To build anticipation for Mid Air, Paris Texas hosted an album listening event on July 20, 2023 in their hometown of Los Angeles at Brain Dead Studios in the Fairfax neighborhood personally debuting the record for fans and supporters, prior to its release, and screening an accompanying short film titled "Head High". The film, set in the not-so-distant future, revolves around Louie Pastel and Felix's ambition (or lack thereof) to leave the planet Earth, along with their dead-end day-job as clerks at an undistinguished convenience stand, in pursuit of an idealized life on a colonized Mars. Additionally, "Head High" features notable guest and cameo appearances from the likes of Noel Miller, Na-Kel Smith and Canadian musician, Mac Demarco respectively. Shortly after the release, the pair announced their first international headlining tour on July 24, 2023, which they successfully embarked across North America and Europe throughout the fall of 2023.

In further promotion of the album, Paris Texas would present a sit-down interview conducted by Long Beach rapper and actor, Vince Staples, titled, "Live from Mars" to their YouTube on September 28, 2023. Directed by Zhamak Fullad, the interview and precedent two-song live performance, seemingly made to appear set on the surface of the red planet, is possibly a referential nod to English musician, King Krule's similar 2018 live performance film, "Live on the Moon".

Around this time, the group would expand the door even further to collaboration, featuring on a number of other artist's songs throughout the remainder of 2023 into the following year, including Florida artist, Yeek's single, "ETA2", released on June 29, 2023, and "Whipcream" with Spanish artist, Ralphie Choo of his debut album, Supernova, released on September 15, 2023 via Rusia-IDK.

The pair would also reunite with Kenny Mason on the collaborative track, "Big Bank", along with American producer, Billy Lemos, released on January 24, 2024. The song, serving as the first single off of music publication, Pigeons and Planes' compilation album series, See You Next Year 2, was recorded at American producer and music guru, Rick Rubin's Shangri-La Studio in Malibu.

On March 28, 2024, the duo would continue their feature run, appearing on "So Long", a single by American producer and Mid Air collaborator, Bien Et Toi from his second EP, A London Safari II, released on May 3. 2024 via AMF/Temple Records. London artist, Haich Ber Na would also release his single featuring the duo, "Hallelujah!", on August 7, 2024.

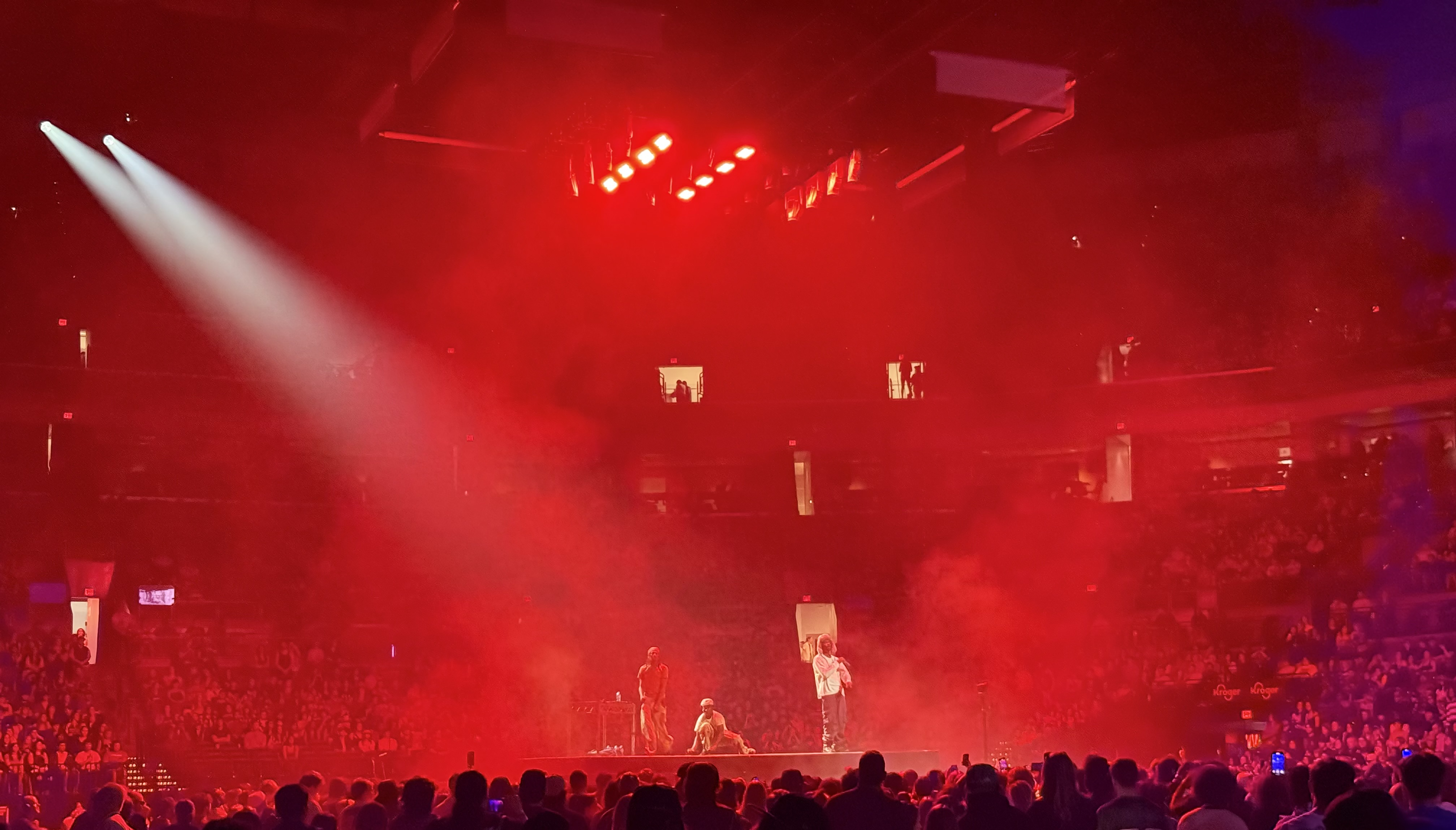
Paris Texas performing at the Schottenstein Center during the Chromakopia World Tour

On October 22, 2024, Paris Texas was announced as the opening act on the entirety of Los Angeles rapper and musical artist, Tyler, the Creator's Chromakopia World Tour, along with Atlanta rapper, Lil Yachty, throughout the majority of that year. The announcement was supplemented by the release of a standalone single, RökKOut.

In the midst of the North American leg of the Chromakopia tour, Paris Texas would surprise-release a consecutive pair of EP's augmented as a two-part project, They Left Me With The Sword and They Left Me With A Gun, within the span of a week from each other on February 21, and February 28, 2025, respectively. The EP's, released once again without prior warning, were preceded by respective singles, "Infiniyte" and "Stripper Song" the previous day of each project.

An accompanying short, shot by Los-Angeles director, Dan Streit (known for his work with Shakewell, A$AP Rocky, BROCKHAMPTON, Charli XCX, etc.), was also attached as a visual component to both projects, with a narrative following the duo as conjoined twins, who face a series of bizarre encounters with a pair of sentient weapons; a claymore and 9mm G17 firearm respectively.

== Discography ==
=== Studio albums ===
Title	Album details
Mid Air	Released: July 21, 2023; Label: Self-released, The Orchard; Formats: 2×LP, digital download, streaming

=== Mixtapes ===
Title	Album details
Boy Anonymous	Released: May 14, 2021; Label: Self-released, The Orchard; Formats: LP, digital download, streaming

=== Extended plays ===
Title	Album details
I'll Get My Revenge in Hell	Released: October 4, 2018; Label: Self-released; Formats: streaming (SoundCloud)
Red Hand Akimbo	Released: October 5, 2021; Label: Self-released; Formats: digital download, streaming, LP
They Left Me With The Sword	Released: February 21, 2025; Label: Self-released; Formats: digital download, streaming
They Left Me With A Gun	Released: February 28, 2025; Label: Self-released; Formats: digital download, streaming

== Singles ==
=== As lead artist ===
Title	Year	Album
"Heavy Metal"	2021	Boy Anonymous
"Situations"	2021	Boy Anonymous
"Force of Habit"	2021	Boy Anonymous
"Girls Like Drugs"	2021	Red Hand Akimbo
"cyanide" (featuring Cryogeyser)	2022	Non-album single
"Panic!!!"	2023	Mid Air
"Bullet Man"	2023	Mid Air
"Everybody's Safe Until..."	2023	Mid Air
"DnD" (featuring Kenny Mason)	2023	Mid Air
"RökKOut"	2024	Non-album single
"infinyte"	2025	They Left Me With The Sword
"Stripper Song"	2025	They Left Me With A Gun

=== As featured artist ===
Title	Year	Album
"Wayback" (FDZ featuring Paris Texas)	2018	Summer Selections
"ETA2" (Yeek featuring Paris Texas)	2023	Future Reference
"Whipcream" (Ralphie Choo featuring Paris Texas)	2023	Supernova
"Big Bank" (Kenny Mason, Paris Texas & Billy Lemos)	2024	Pigeons and Planes presents: "See You Next Year 2"
"So Long" (Bien Et Toi featuring Paris Texas)	2024	London Safari III
"Hallelujah!" (Haich Ber Na featuring Paris Texas)	2024	The Everyday
"NDA" (Zelooperz featuring Paris Texas)	2025	Dali Aint Dead
"Must Be Nice" (William J. Sullivan featuring Paris Texas)	2025	Just Call Me Bill
"BE WHAT I WANT" (Kenny Mason featuring Paris Texas)	2026	BULLDAWG

== Songwriting and production ==
Track	Year	Role	Credit(s)	Artist(s)	Album
"Hooper"	2022	Additional vocals	Kenneth Blume, John Gee, Nick Lee, Cory Henry	Kenny Beats	Louie
"Hot Hand"	2022	Writers/additional vocals	Kenneth Blume, Paris Texas, Cory Henry, Daryl Johns, Oliver Johnson, Matthew Tavares, Sonia Bazanta Vides	Kenny Beats	Louie
