= Honeypie =

Single by Johnny Utah
- Language: English
- Released: April 26, 2019
- Genre: Nu-disco
- Length: 2:15
- Label: Independent
- Songwriter: Johnny Utah
- Producer: Johnny Utah

Johnny Utah singles chronology
"Really Meant" (2018)	"Honeypie" (2019)	"4Tounce" (2019)

Music video
- "Honeypie" on YouTube

"Honeypie" is a song by American singer Johnny Utah who currently goes by Jawny.

== Personnel ==
Credits adapted from Apple Music.

Musicians

- Johnny Utah – Vocals

Technical

- Johnny Utah – Songwriter, Producer

== Commercial performance ==
The song went viral on TikTok in 2019. The song has over 272 million streams on Spotify.

== Certifications ==
Certifications for "Honeypie"
Region	Certification	Certified units/sales
Canada (Music Canada)	Platinum	80,000^{‡}
United Kingdom (BPI)	Silver	200,000^{‡}
United States (RIAA)	Platinum	1,000,000^{‡}
^{‡} Sales+streaming figures based on certification alone.
