= Mid Air (Paris Texas album) =

Studio album by Paris Texas
- Released: July 21, 2023
- Length: 50:22
- Label: Self-released
- Producer: Billy Lemos; Dilip; Gianluca Buccellati; Julian Ali; M; Matt Cohn; Paris Texas; Rodaidh McDonald; Romil Hemnani; William J. Sullivan

Paris Texas chronology
| Red Hand Akimbo (2021) | Mid Air (2023) | They Left Me With the Sword (2025) |

Singles from Mid Air
- 1. "Panic!!!" Released: March 30, 2023; 2. "Bullet Man" Released: May 12, 2023; 3. "Everybody's Safe Until" Released: June 16, 2023; 4. "DnD" Released: July 18, 2023

Mid Air is the debut studio album by American Los Angeles-based hip hop duo Paris Texas. It was self-released on July 21, 2023. Production was handled by Dilip, William J. Sullivan, Gianluca Buccellati, M, Matt Cohn, Billy Lemos, Julian Ali, Rodaidh McDonald, Romil Hemnani and Paris Texas. It features guest appearances from Kenny Mason and Teezo Touchdown.

== Critical reception ==
Professional ratings
Aggregate scores
| Source | Rating |
|---|---|
| Metacritic | 84/100 |
Review scores
| Source | Rating |
| DIY | 4/5 stars |
| Loud and Quiet | 8/10 |
| NME | 4/5 stars |
| The Line of Best Fit | 8/10 |
| The Observer | 4/5 stars |

Mid Air was met with generally favorable reviews from music critics. At Metacritic, which assigns a normalized rating out of 100 to reviews from mainstream publications, the album received an average score of 84, based on four reviews.

Emma Swann of DIY found it to be "not always an easy listen, but a consistently thrilling ride". Jake Crossland of Loud and Quiet praised the work, saying: "it's an assured debut full-length, committing to weird impulses and catchy choruses in equal measure, and even at 16 tracks it never feels unwieldy. Paris Texas make chaos look inviting – they're the eye of one very exciting storm". Sophie Williams of NME wrote: "a record, feels truly – and brilliantly – emblematic of the sharp, controlled chaos that Paris Texas have honed over a handful of previous EPs". Hayley Milross of The Line of Best Fit called the effort "a dazzling introduction to new fans, and a crystal clear familiarity for fans that have been here from the beginning". Kitty Empire of The Observer wrote: "the result is a full-length debut that is acerbic, vulnerable and swaggering all at the same time".

=== Year-end lists ===
Mid Air on year-end lists
| Publication | # | Ref. |
|---|---|---|
| Alternative Press | —N/a | |
| Consequence | 12 | |
| Coup de Main | 9 | |
| The Line of Best Fit | 37 | |
| Loud and Quiet | 20 | |

== Track listing ==
Mid Air track listing
| No. | Title | Producer(s) | Length |
|---|---|---|---|
| 1. | "TenThirtySeven" | Paris Texas; Dilip; William J. Sullivan; Gianluca Buccellati; Matt Cohn; Billy Lemos | 2:48 |
| 2. | "Split-Screen" | Paris Texas; Dilip | 2:25 |
| 3. | "DnD" (featuring Kenny Mason) | Paris Texas; Dilip; William J. Sullivan; Julian Ali; Romil Hemnani | 4:11 |
| 4. | "Sean-Jared" | Paris Texas; Dilip; William J. Sullivan | 2:37 |
| 5. | "Closed Caption" | Paris Texas; Dilip | 2:12 |
| 6. | "Bullet Man" | Paris Texas; Dilip; William J. Sullivan; Gianluca Buccellati | 2:58 |
| 7. | "NuWhip" | Paris Texas; Dilip; William J. Sullivan; Matt Cohn | 2:52 |
| 8. | "Panic!!!" | Paris Texas; Dilip; M | 2:20 |
| 9. | "Everybody's Safe Until" | Paris Texas; Dilip; William J. Sullivan; Gianluca Buccellati; Rodaidh McDonald | 3:39 |
| 10. | "Lift Off" | Paris Texas; Dilip; M | 3:02 |
| 11. | "Earth-2" | Paris Texas; Dilip; William J. Sullivan; M | 2:57 |
| 12. | "Airborne" | Paris Texas; Dilip | 2:51 |
| 13. | "Full English" (featuring Teezo Touchdown) | Paris Texas; Dilip; William J. Sullivan; Gianluca Buccellati | 2:31 |
| 14. | "Lana Del Rey" | Paris Texas; Dilip; William J. Sullivan | 3:40 |
| 15. | "Ain't No High" | Paris Texas; Dilip; William J. Sullivan; M | 3:36 |
| 16. | "We Fall" | Paris Texas; Dilip; Matt Cohn | 5:43 |
| Total length: | | | 50:22 |

Notes

- "TenThirtySeven" is stylized as "tenTHIRTYseven".
- "Bullet Man" and "Panic!!!" are stylized in all caps.
- "NuWhip" is stylized as "NüWhip".
- "Everybody's Safe Until" is stylized as "Everybody's Safe Until...".
- "We Fall" is stylized as "...We Fall".
