= Still Woozy =

American indie pop singer/songwriter

- Born: Sven Eric Gamsky; June 23, 1992 (age 34)
- Origin: Oakland, California, U.S.
- Genres: Indie pop; bedroom pop; psychedelic pop
- Years active: 2005–present
- Label: Interscope Records
- Formerly of: Feed Me Jack
- Website: www.woozystill.com

Still Woozy is the solo project of Sven Eric Gamsky (born June 23, 1992), an American singer and songwriter from Moraga, California. Gamsky grew up in Moraga, California, in the San Francisco Bay Area. He began recording his own music at the age of 13.

NME has described his style as "psychedelic bedroom-pop", while IQ sees it as "genre-bending".

== Early life ==
Sven Gamsky was born on June 23, 1992, in Oakland, California, and grew up in Moraga, California. He is the youngest of three sons born to Dr. Tom and Berit (Fuglsang) Gamsky, and has two older brothers, Nate and Sam. Sven started playing the guitar when he was in middle school.

All of the Gamsky brothers became Eagle Scouts. Sven was a part of Moraga Boy Scout Troop 212, in which his service project toward becoming an Eagle Scout involved remodeling a garden area at Donald L. Rheem Elementary School in Moraga. The East Bay Times reported in 2010 upon his achievement of Eagle Scout that "Sven plans to travel and volunteer after high school, and eventually study psychology in college."

Sven Gamsky attended Campolindo High School in Moraga, California. He graduated in 2010. While in high school, he played guitar and bass in the band "Shoot for Roots". At the beginning of their senior year, "Shoot for Roots" won a Battle of the Bands competition hosted by the Lamorinda Teen Center. They had initially come to a tie with a band called IceBox Business from rival high school, Miramonte High School, but fans from Campolindo High broke the tie by cheering louder for Gamsky's band, with a recording of 116 decibels.

After high school, Gamsky earned money by teaching guitar in the Oakland area and playing with the band Feed Me Jack at jazz clubs, festivals, and orchestra halls. Later, while attending the University of California, Santa Cruz, he met Legwurk artist Tani Kahn who would later play as his opener as well as guitar, bass, and keys during his live shows, both before Covid and during his 2022 If This Isn't Nice, I Don't Know What Is tour. He graduated in 2015, majoring in music with a classical guitar emphasis, and minoring in electronic music.

== Career ==
=== 2011–2016: Feed Me Jack ===
From 2011 to 2016, Gamsky was in the alternative rock/math rock band called Feed Me Jack. Gamsky met the other band members his freshman year at University of California, Santa Cruz. The band released four albums. In 2016, the band separated, on good terms, in order for the members to individually pursue their careers in music.

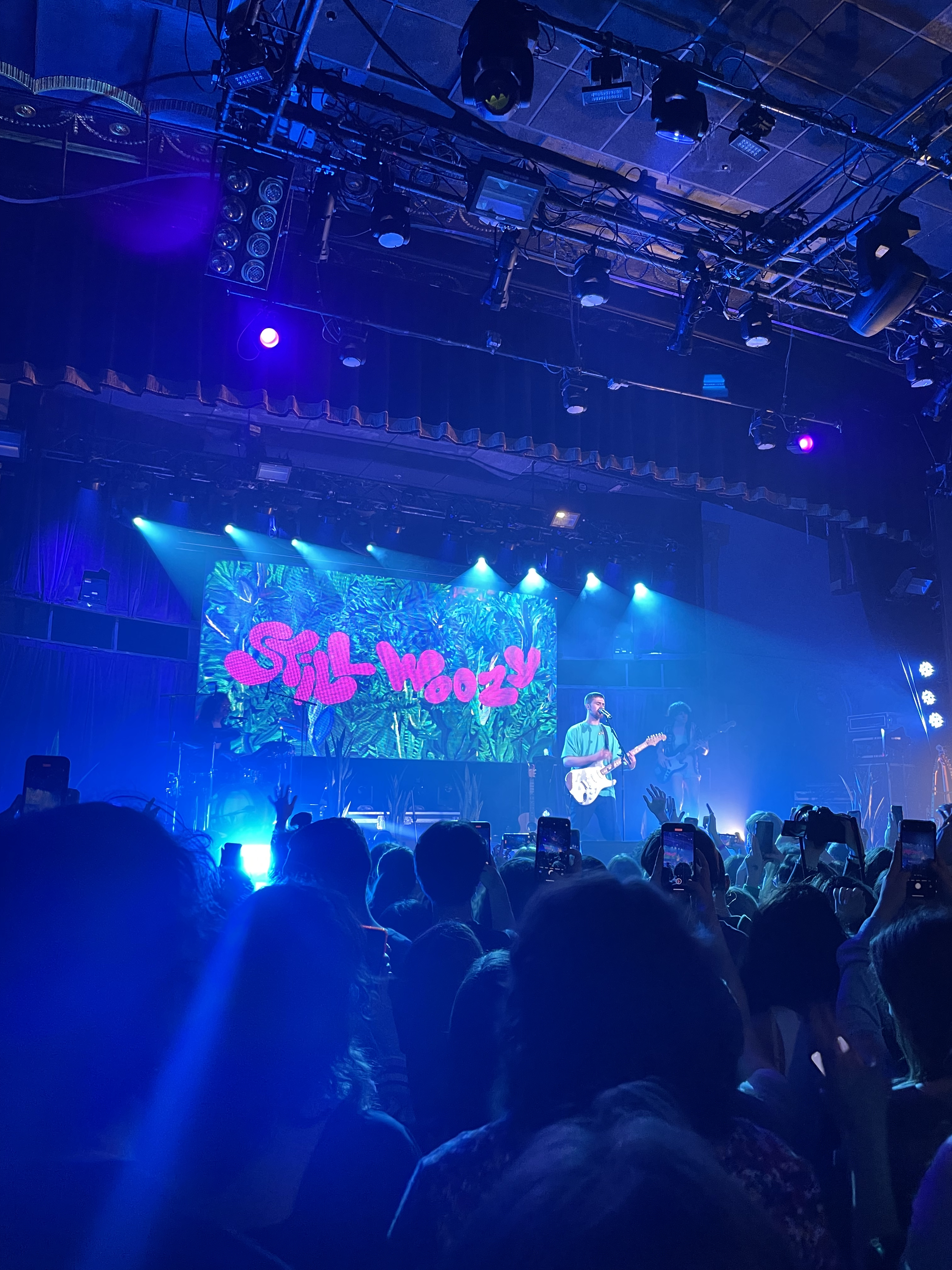
2022 If This Isn't Nice, I Don't Know What Is album tour, Boston, Massachusetts

=== 2019–present: Still Woozy ===
In 2017, Gamsky released his first single, "Vacation", under the stage name Still Woozy. 25 years old at the time, Gamsky stated that he chose the name because of his spaced-out nature. His song "Cooks" was featured in the 2018 Netflix movie The After Party.

In 2019, Gamsky went on tour, which included sets in many U.S. states on the West Coast and throughout the midwestern states. He also played in some locations in Canada and The Netherlands. A 2020 tour, which would have had 31 performances starting in May and ending in September, was postponed due to the COVID-19 pandemic. That same year, his single "Window" was featured in FIFA 21.

On August 13, 2021, he released his debut album If This Isn't Nice, I Don't Know What Is. It serves as his first studio album, including the singles "Window", "Rocky", "That's Life", and "Get Down", which had been released prior to the album.

In June 2021, Still Woozy announced his If This Isn't Nice, I Don't Know What Is tour. This tour contained 54 performances spanning across the United States, the United Kingdom and Australia. This tour's set list included the majority of songs from his 2021 debut album of the same name, along with some of his most popular hits. The tour featured two alternating openers or 'special guests', Loveleo and Wallice.

In 2022, on April 15 and 22, Still Woozy performed at Coachella at the Empire Polo Club in Indio, California. Later in the year he helped produce the song "Too Late" on SZA's album SOS.

Still Woozy collaborated with Remi Wolf on the song "Pool", which was released as a single and also accompanied by a music video in 2022. In December 2023, he released an original song, "Anyone But You", derived from the film of the same name starring Sydney Sweeney and Glen Powell.

As of 2024, Still Woozy has released an album, an EP, several singles, and eleven music videos, the first of which was released in 2017. Gamsky prefers to release music as soon as possible and will sometimes release a song on the same day he has finished making it.

Still Woozy’s second album, Loveseat, was released on June 28, 2024. The album was announced shortly after the March 22 release of its first single, "Shotput". A second single, "Again", was released on April 19.

== Album information ==
Still Woozy's 2021 debut album If This Isn't Nice, I Don't Know What Is contains 13 songs.

The title of this album is a Kurt Vonnegut quote. In a September 2021 interview with The Village Voice, Gamsky references Kurt Vonnegut and highlights the importance of recognizing the good moments in life. In the interview, Gamsky says that the cancellation of his 2020 tour due to COVID-19 was the best thing to happen to his debut album, as it allowed him "to really double down on it and figure it out".

This album also features Gamsky on the album cover instead of the past art that had previously been featured on this album. In a 2022 interview, Gamsky stated that he "wanted there to be some sort of delineation between the single art and the (album) cover art."

Gamsky self-produces his music content, but on If This Isn't Nice, I Don't Know What Is he enlisted his friend Lars Stalfors for help. Although Stalfors does not play any instruments, Gamsky stated that it was helpful to have a "sounding board".

Still Woozy released his second album, Loveseat, on June 28, 2024.

== Personal life ==
Gamsky married longtime girlfriend Amiya Kahn-Tietz on the last weekend of July, 2022. He has stated that she is his biggest inspiration. She is the artist behind Still Woozy's single covers. The couple had a child, Shaia Blue Kahn-Fuglsang, on December 20, 2023.

== Discography ==
=== With Feed Me Jack ===
- Chumpfrey (2012)
- Anatolia (2013)
- Covers (2015)
- Ultra Ego (2016)

=== As Still Woozy ===
==== Studio albums ====
Title	Details	Peak chart positions
Title	Details	US
If This Isn't Nice, I Don't Know What Is	Released: August 13, 2021; Label: Interscope; Format: Digital download, streaming, vinyl, cassette	150
Loveseat	Released: June 28, 2024; Label: Interscope; Format: Digital download, streaming, vinyl, cassette	TBA

==== Extended plays ====
List of EPs, with release date and label shown
Title	EP details
Lately	Released: May 3, 2019; Label: Interscope; Formats: Digital download, streaming

==== Singles ====
List of singles, with year released and album name shown
Title	Year	Peak chart positions			Certifications	Album
Title	Year	US Alt.	US Rock	NZ Hot	Certifications	Album
"Vacation"	2017	—	—	—		Non-album singles
"Cooks"	2017	—	—	—		Non-album singles
"Wolfcat"	2017	—	—	—		Non-album singles
"Goodie Bag"	2017	—	—	—	RIAA: Platinum; RMNZ: Platinum	Non-album singles
"Habit"	2019	—	—	—	RIAA: Gold; RMNZ: Gold	Lately
"BS"	2020	—	—	—		Non-album single
"Window"	2020	—	—	24	RMNZ: Gold	If This Isn't Nice, I Don't Know What Is
"Rocky"	2021	—	45	—		If This Isn't Nice, I Don't Know What Is
"Kenny"	2021	—	—	40		If This Isn't Nice, I Don't Know What Is
"That's Life"	2021	—	—	—		If This Isn't Nice, I Don't Know What Is
"Get Down"	2021	—	—	—		If This Isn't Nice, I Don't Know What Is
"Woof"	2021	34	50	—		If This Isn't Nice, I Don't Know What Is
"Anyone but You"	2023	—	—	23		Non-album single
"Shotput"	2024	—	—	38		Loveseat
"Again"	2024	—	—	—		Loveseat
"All Your Life"	2024	—	—	29		Loveseat
"Lemon"	2024	—	—	—		Loveseat
"—" denotes a title that did not chart, or was not released in that territory.

==== Collaborative singles ====
List of singles, with year released and album name shown
Title	Year	Artist(s)	Album
"Lucy"	2018	Still Woozy (feat. ODIE)	Non-album single
"Fast Talk (Still Woozy Remix)"	2019	Houses (feat. Still Woozy)	Drugstore Heaven (Remixes)
"Ipanema"	2019	Still Woozy (feat. Omar Apollo + Elujay)	Lately
"Wait"	2019	Billy Lemos (feat. Still Woozy + Blake Saint David)	Non-album single
"Wonder"	2020	Billy Lemos (feat. Still Woozy & MTMBO)	Wonder
"Cheesin'"	2020	Cautious Clay (feat. Melanie Faye, Still Woozy, Remi Wolf, Sophie Meiers, Claud, and HXNS)	Non-album singles
"Hush (Still Woozy Remix)"	2021	The Marías (feat. Still Woozy)	Non-album singles
"Pool"	2022	Remi Wolf & Still Woozy	Non-album singles
