= Lexa Gates =

American rapper (born 2001)

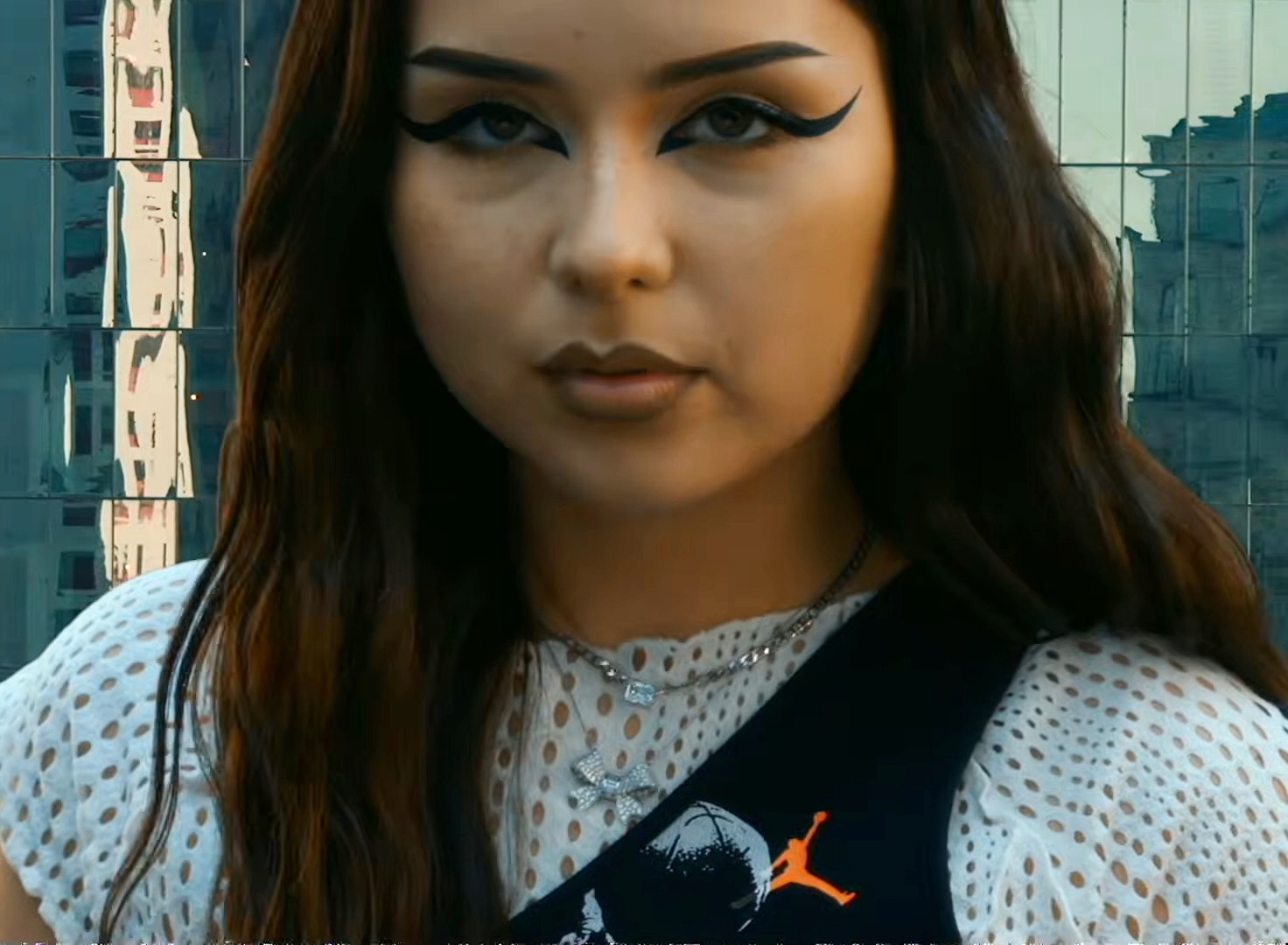
- Gates in 2026

Background information
- Born: April 8, 2001 (age 25); Queens, New York City, U.S.
- Genre: Hip-hop
- Occupations: Rapper; singer
- Labels: Capitol; GoodTalk
- Website: lexagates.com

Ivanna Alexandra Martinez (born April 8, 2001), known as Lexa Gates, is an American rapper and singer.

== Early life ==
At a young age, Gates lived with her father and sister in Puerto Rico. Her mother has previously written songs and sung in cafés as a hobby. Her mother saved up money from packing cigarettes in Puerto Rico to move back to the Queens borough of New York City, where Gates grew up. She began playing piano after watching her mother do so. She participated in singing lessons as a child. She dropped out of the New York City public school system at fifteen years old, when she was in the tenth grade, and later began making music at the age of seventeen.

== Musical career ==
Gates' debut album, Order of Events, was released in 2020. Her second album, Universe Wrapped in Flesh, was released in 2022. In October 2024, she released her album Elite Vessel. That same month, she locked herself in a glass box in Manhattan's Union Square for ten hours to promote the album. She released I Am on January 16, 2026. In promotion for the album, she performed an immersive art installation at the Jeffrey Deitch Gallery in New York City in which she walked on a human-sized hamster wheel for 10 hours.

== Personal life ==
Gates has been sober from alcohol since her twenty-first birthday.

== Discography ==
- Order of Events (2020)
- Delirium (2021)
- Hungry (2021)
- Universe Wrapped in Flesh (2022)
- Elite Vessel (2024)
- I Am (2026)
