= Big Ideas (album) =

Studio album by Remi Wolf
- Released: July 12, 2024
- Recorded: 2022–2023
- Genre: Pop · funk · disco
- Length: 43:03
- Label: Island
- Producers: Ethan Gruska; Kenny Beats; Knox Fortune; Carter Lang; Leon Michels; Porches; Solomonophonic; Remi Wolf

Remi Wolf chronology
Juno (2021)	Big Ideas (2024)	Mud (2026)

Singles from Big Ideas
- 1. "Cinderella" Released: March 21, 2024; 2. "Toro" Released: May 10, 2024; 3. "Alone in Miami" Released: May 10, 2024; 4. "Motorcycle" Released: June 13, 2024; 5. "Soup" Released: July 11, 2024

Big Ideas is the second studio album by American singer and songwriter Remi Wolf, released on July 12, 2024, through Island Records. It received positive reviews from critics.

== Critical reception ==
Professional ratings
Aggregate scores
Source	Rating
Metacritic	80/100
Review scores
Source	Rating
AllMusic	4/5 stars
DIY	5/5 stars
Exclaim!	8/10
The Line of Best Fit	7/10
NME	4/5 stars
The Observer	3/5 stars
Paste	7.3/10
Spin	B+
Pitchfork	7.1/10

Big Ideas received a score of 80 out of 100 on review aggregator Metacritic based on nine critics' reviews, which the website categorized as "generally favorable" reception. Jordan Currie of Exclaim! wrote that Wolf "takes all of the big ideas in her head and throws them like neon splatter onto an already messy canvas", with the album showcasing "more of what she does best: brash, explosive pop with a don't-give-a-fuck spirit and touches of vulnerable self-reflection and soul". Jordan Bassett of Spin felt that Big Ideas "jostles with brilliant songcraft that signifies her rapid growth as an artist—if the essential aesthetic is little changed, the execution is often warmer, more mature and expansive". NME's Hannah Mylrea described it as "a record that – while injected with a healthy dose of groovy fun – is keenly honest. And although it may be sonically sugar-coated, Wolf's candid lyrics never are. It's funk-fuelled catharsis".

DIY's Otis Robinson opined that it "tumbl[es] into glamorous imperfection and cacophonous garage-band pop that sits starkly against the corporate rigidity and rigmarole of modern pop". The Line of Best Fit's Adele Julia found it to be "desperate to underscore outspoken songwriting with equally raucous production, fit with all the bells and whistles one could ever need". Reviewing the album for The Observer, Shaad D'Souza called it "a slight but enjoyable record. Wolf's influences are often so legible that it's hard not to listen and play a game of spot-the-reference", although conceded that it is "hard to deny that she's working in the lingua franca of our time". Describing the album as taking inspiration from disco, 1960's soul, reggae and psychedelic rock, Pitchfork's Boutayna Chokrane wrote "Wolf sounds like she's commanding you to vogue through your own dress-up montage, somersaulting through the melody with the whimsical attitude of a young Cyndi Lauper. [Wolf]'s a little bit scattered, and sounds right at home."

Sam Rosenberg of Paste wrote that the album "may never quite meet the sum of its parts, but Remi Wolf's formidable technical confidence, innovative spirit and singular ability to navigate pop music trends without the impulse to pander make her incredibly exciting to listen to" and "reaffirms her talent among the crowded crop of other indie pop artists who emerged in the early 2020s". Marcy Donelson of AllMusic observed that "while Big Ideas could be accused of being uneven, filler is a matter of personal genre preference here, [as] left turns that are fun or even funny dominate".

Critics' year-end rankings of Big Ideas
Publication	List	Rank	Ref.
Exclaim!	50 Best Albums of 2024	48	
NPR	The 50 Best Albums of 2024	—	

== Track listing ==
Big Ideas track listing
No.	Title	Writer(s)	Producer(s)	Length
1.	"Cinderella"	Remi Wolf; Jared Solomon	Wolf; Solomonophonic	4:03
2.	"Soup"	Wolf; Carter Lang; Kevin Rhomberg; Solomon	Wolf; Solomonophonic; Lang; Knox Fortune	3:33
3.	"Motorcycle"	Wolf; Kenneth Blume III; Paul Castelluzzo; Leon Michels; Nick Movshon; Homer Steinweiss	Wolf; Kenny Beats; Michels	2:46
4.	"Toro"	Wolf; Jack DeMeo; Ethan Gruska; Solomon	Wolf; Solomonophonic; Gruska	2:55
5.	"Alone in Miami"	Wolf; DeMeo; Gruska	Wolf; Solomonophonic; Gruska	2:41
6.	"Cherries & Cream"	Wolf; Rhomberg; Solomon	Wolf; Solomonophonic; Knox Fortune	4:26
7.	"Kangaroo"	Wolf; Michels; Movshon; Solomon	Wolf; Solomonophonic; Michels	3:54
8.	"Pitiful"	Wolf; Benny Sings; Solomon	Wolf; Solomonophonic	3:05
9.	"Wave"	Wolf; Lang; Rhomberg; Solomon	Wolf; Solomonophonic; Lang; Knox Fortune	3:49
10.	"When I Thought of You"	Wolf; Aaron Maine; Solomon	Wolf; Solomonophonic; Porches	2:39
11.	"Frog Rock"	Wolf; DeMeo; Gruska; Solomon	Wolf; Solomonophonic; Gruska	3:45
12.	"Just the Start"	Wolf	Wolf; Kenny Beats; Michels	2:19
13.	"Slay Bitch" (bonus track)	Wolf; Curtis Hudson; Jacob Portrait; Solomon; Lisa Stevens	Wolf; Solomonophonic; Portrait	3:08
Total length:				43:03

== Personnel ==
Musicians

- Remi Wolf – lead vocals (all tracks), percussion (tracks 1, 4–9, 11, 13), glockenspiel (1), synthesizer (2, 6, 8), drums (2, 7, 11), keyboards (4, 6, 8, 13), programming (4, 11), pedal steel (11), acoustic guitar (13)
- Jared Solomon – bass (tracks 1, 2, 4–8, 10, 11, 13), guitar (1, 2, 4, 6–11, 13); drums, percussion (1, 4, 6–9, 11, 13); organ, Rhodes, synth pads (1); drum programming (2, 7, 13), synthesizer (2, 8, 9), additional keyboards (2), programming (4, 8, 9, 11, 13), keyboards (4, 8, 9, 13), acoustic guitar (8)
- Leon Michels – saxophone (tracks 1, 7), flute (3, 6); keyboards, percussion (3, 7); horn, programming (7)
- Nick Lee – trombone (track 1)
- Dave Guy – trumpet (track 1)
- Knox Fortune – synthesizer (tracks 2, 9); keyboards, Mellotron (6); programming, sound design (9)
- Nick Movshon – bass (tracks 3, 7)
- Paul Castelluzzo – guitar (tracks 3, 12)
- Homer Steinweiss – drums (track 3)
- Ethan Gruska – keyboards, programming (tracks 4, 5, 11); guitar, percussion (4, 11); bass, synthesizer (4); drums, harp (11)
- Jack DeMeo – guitar (tracks 4, 5, 11)
- Matt Chamberlain – drums, percussion (track 5)
- Benny Sings – keyboards (track 8)
- Carter Lang – bass, percussion, programming (track 9)
- Aaron Maine – vocals, keyboards (track 10)
- Vikram Devasthali – horn (track 11)
- Jacob Portrait – keyboards (track 13)
- Daniel Ferenbach – strings (track 13)

Technical

- Chris Gehringer – mastering
- Shawn Everett – mixing
- John Muller – engineering (tracks 1, 2, 6, 7, 9, 10, 13)
- John Rooney – engineering (tracks 1, 2, 6, 7)
- Michael Deano – engineering (track 1)
- Chris Connors – engineering (tracks 3, 12)
- Jens Jungkurth – engineering (tracks 3, 12)
- Ethan Gruska – engineering (tracks 4, 5, 11)
- Rachel White – engineering (tracks 4, 5, 11)
- Joseph Lorge – engineering (tracks 4, 11)
- Jared Solomon – engineering (tracks 8, 13)

== Charts ==
Chart performance for Big Ideas
Chart (2024)	Peak position
Scottish Albums (Official Charts)	27
UK Albums Sales (Official Charts)	15
US Billboard 200	95
