= Melanie Faye =

American musician

- Born: May 16, 1998 (age 27)
- Occupation: Guitarist
- Years active: 2016–present
- Website: melaniefaye

Melanie Faye (born May 16, 1998), is an American R&B musician and social media personality. She became known after a video of her guitar playing on Instagram went viral in the summer of 2017. She has since performed with artists such as Noname and Mac Demarco. She was a featured artist at the NAMM Show.

== Early life and education ==
Born in Huntsville, Alabama and raised in a Jehovah's Witness household by chemist parents, Faye began writing songs at an early age. Her family moved to Nashville, Tennessee when she was three, and in the third grade she won a music competition run by the Country Music Hall of Fame. She credits her fascination with becoming a musician from learning how to play Guitar Hero in middle school. She got her first guitar a year later "trading in her Xbox controller for the real thing." She studied jazz guitar at the performing arts high school Nashville School of the Arts. Faye had "idolized Mariah Carey when I was a little girl," and started writing songs when she was 19.

== Career ==
Faye's guitar skills came to prominence in the summer of 2017 when SZA retweeted a 2016 video of Faye playing her sky blue Fender Stratocaster. Amassing a large number of followers and receiving critical acclaim, she dropped out of school to pursue music full-time. She cites Jimi Hendrix, Michael Jackson, and Eric Gale as major influences on her playing style, which varies between R&B, neo-soul, and funk. She has performed nationwide with associated soul and R&B acts such as Noname, Bibi McGill, Masego, and Dammo. She was featured on the cover of She Shreds magazine, and was chosen by Fender to demo the Player Series of guitars. Faye sees her guitar playing as a role model for others: "I want more people who don't necessarily listen to rock to also play guitar."

== Discography ==
=== Singles ===
- Melanie Faye EP (August 13, 2020)
- It's a Moot Point (March 17, 2020)
- Super Sad Always (December 20, 2019)
- Eternally 12 (February 1, 2019)
