= Remi Wolf =

American recording artist (born 1996)

- Wolf in 2022

Background information
- Born: Remi Francis Wolf; February 2, 1996 (age 30); Palo Alto, California, U.S.
- Genres: Soul; R&B; pop; funk; bedroom pop
- Occupations: Singer; songwriter; record producer
- Instrument: Vocals
- Years active: 2014–present
- Labels: Island; EMI
- Website: remiwolf.com

Remi Francis Wolf (born February 2, 1996) is an American singer and songwriter from Palo Alto, California. As a senior in high school, she appeared as a contestant on American Idol in 2014. After completing her undergraduate music studies in 2018, she made her solo debut with the self-released extended play You're a Dog! in October 2019. Wolf subsequently released her second EP and major-label debut, I'm Allergic to Dogs!, on Island Records and Virgin EMI Records in June 2020, followed by her debut studio album, Juno, in October 2021. She released her second album, Big Ideas, on July 12, 2024. Her third studio album, Mud, was released on October 9, 2026. She was nominated for Best New Artist at the 69th Annual Grammy Awards.

== Early life and education ==
Wolf was born in Chicago, Illinois on February 2, 1996, to a Sicilian mother and a Russian-Persian father before moving to Palo Alto, California. At around the age of eight she became interested in competitive skiing, and competed during her youth.

When she was 14, Wolf formed her first band with a friend. They called it Remi and Chloe (later, Remi, Chloe, & The Extracts). As a senior at Palo Alto High School, Wolf appeared as a contestant during the audition rounds on the thirteenth season of American Idol in 2014, being cut in Hollywood week without being aired there. At age 17, she moved to Los Angeles, where she attended the USC Thornton School of Music, graduating in 2018 at the age of 22.

== Career ==
Wolf met producer Jared Solomon, known as Solomonophonic, while in high school and began collaborating with him thereafter. Her first single, "Guy", was produced by Solomon and was released in 2019. Off the success of that song, Wolf opened for Still Woozy on his tour in April of that year. She also toured with Cautious Clay and performed at both the Los Angeles Times Festival of Books and Viva Pomona! later in 2019. She released her first EP, You're a Dog!, in September 2019. She was later signed to Island Records, a division of the Universal Music Group.

Her first single as an Island signee, "Woo!", was released in April 2020. That was followed by the singles "Photo ID" and "Disco Man". Those tracks would go on to appear on Wolf's second EP, I'm Allergic to Dogs!, released in June 2020 via Island. "Photo ID" accrued numerous streams and shares on TikTok throughout 2020. In November 2020, her single "Hello Hello Hello" was featured in an ad for the iPhone 12. The track 'Photo ID' placed 75 on Australian radio station Triple J's Hottest 100 for 2020. In May 2021, she released We Love Dogs!, a remix EP with guest appearances from acts like Sylvan Esso, Beck, Dominic Fike, Hot Chip, and others.

Later in 2021, Wolf began releasing new singles, including "Liquor Store", "Grumpy Old Man", and "Quiet on Set". These would appear on her major label debut studio album, Juno, released via Island in October 2021. In March 2022, she released the single "Pool" with Still Woozy. Later that year, Wolf opened for Lorde on the North American leg of her "Solar Power" tour. In June 2022, Wolf released a "deluxe" version of Juno with four additional tracks. That month, she toured throughout Europe, including a stop at the Firenze Rocks festival in Florence, Italy where she performed with the Red Hot Chili Peppers and Nas. Those dates constituted the first leg of Wolf's "Gwingle Gwongle" tour, which had stops across North America later in the fall of 2022. In August 2022 in collaboration with Spotify, Wolf released the Live at Electric Lady EP, a collection of six live songs, including a cover of Frank Ocean's "Pink + White". In November 2022, Wolf announced her first tour of Australia and New Zealand during which she was scheduled to play multiple festivals and a handful of headlining shows in December 2022 and January 2023. Wolf performed at the 22nd Coachella Valley Music and Arts Festival in April 2023. Her hit song "Monte Carlo" was featured in the Netflix movie You Are So Not Invited to My Bat Mitzvah in August 2023. Before the release of her second album, she appeared as the supporting act on some of the European concerts of Olivia Rodrigo's Guts World Tour.

Throughout March and July, singles "Cinderella", "Toro", "Alone in Miami", "Motorcycle", "Soup" and "Pitiful" were put out to promote Wolf's second album, Big Ideas, which was announced to release in July 2024. "Soup" was dubbed a "funk-flecked synth-pop cut" by NME's Hannah Mylrea. Pitchfork's Boutayna Chokrane regarded "Cinderella" as a "Soul Train-inspired disco-funk number about [Wolf]'s everyday mood swings". Big Ideas charted at 15 and 27 on the UK Sales Chart and Scottish Album Charts, respectively, and received critical acclaim, massing an 80/100 score from music aggravator Metacritic. In December 2023, Wolf covered Amy Winehouse's cover of The Zutons' song 'Valerie' for radio station Triple J's weekly program, Like A Version.

Wolf appeared in the series premiere of Amazon Prime Video original Off Campus in May 2026. She portrayed herself and performed works including "Soup", "Alone in Miami", "Toro", and a cover of "Dancing with Myself".

On July 31, 2026, Wolf released "Twiggy", the first single from her third studio album. A music video was released the same day, featuring Wolf and Wallows drummer Cole Preston. Shortly after, she began releasing snippets of a second single titled "Bottle". Both singles have been promoted via snippets on her Instagram profile and the drop platform Laylo. "Bottle" and its music video were released on August 20, 2026. In the same month, her song "Guerrilla" was featured in the trailer for season two of the TV show Adults. A third single "I Won’t Cry" was released on September 25, 2026. Wolf's third-studio album, Mud, was released on October 9, 2026. She is scheduled to embark a North American tour in support of the album in 2027.

== Artistry ==
Musically, Wolf performs in what she describes as a "funky soul pop" genre. In a 2021 interview, she stated she wants to "constantly try to innovate the sound of pop music" and "erase the rules of pop". The New York Times wrote that she turns the bedroom pop genre into "hypercolored explosions". Wolf cites Still Woozy, SZA, and John Mayer as musical influences.

== Personal life ==
Wolf is bisexual. She has been based in Los Angeles, California, since circa 2014. In June 2020, she checked into rehab for alcohol use disorder. In 2021 she stated she had been sober since the summer of 2020, and that in past instances she frequently drank to the point of blacking out; although she could easily function in daily life, she had started fighting with family, friends and collaborators. In 2024, she said she began to moderate her use of alcohol instead of cutting alcohol out of her life entirely: "I have more experience with moderation, knowing when to let myself have fun and when I need to rein it back." In 2026, she stated that she had gotten sober again the prior year, and during the production of her third studio album, Mud. She has ADHD.

== Discography ==
Studio albums

- Juno (2021)
- Big Ideas (2024)
- Mud (2026)

== Filmography ==
=== Television ===
Year	Title	Role	Notes
2014	American Idol	Self	Contestant, season 13, advanced to Hollywood rounds
2026	Off Campus	Self	Season 1, episode 1

== Tours ==
=== Headlining ===
- Gwingle Gwongle Tour (2022)
- Big Ideas Tour (2024)
- Mud Tour (2027)

=== Supporting act ===
- Cautious Clay's Context Tour (2019)
- Halsey's Love and Power Tour (2022)
- Lorde's Solar Power Tour (North American dates) (2023)
- Paramore's This Is Why Tour (Oceania dates) (2023)
- Olivia Rodrigo's Guts World Tour (European dates) (2024)
