= Jawny =

American singer (born 1995)

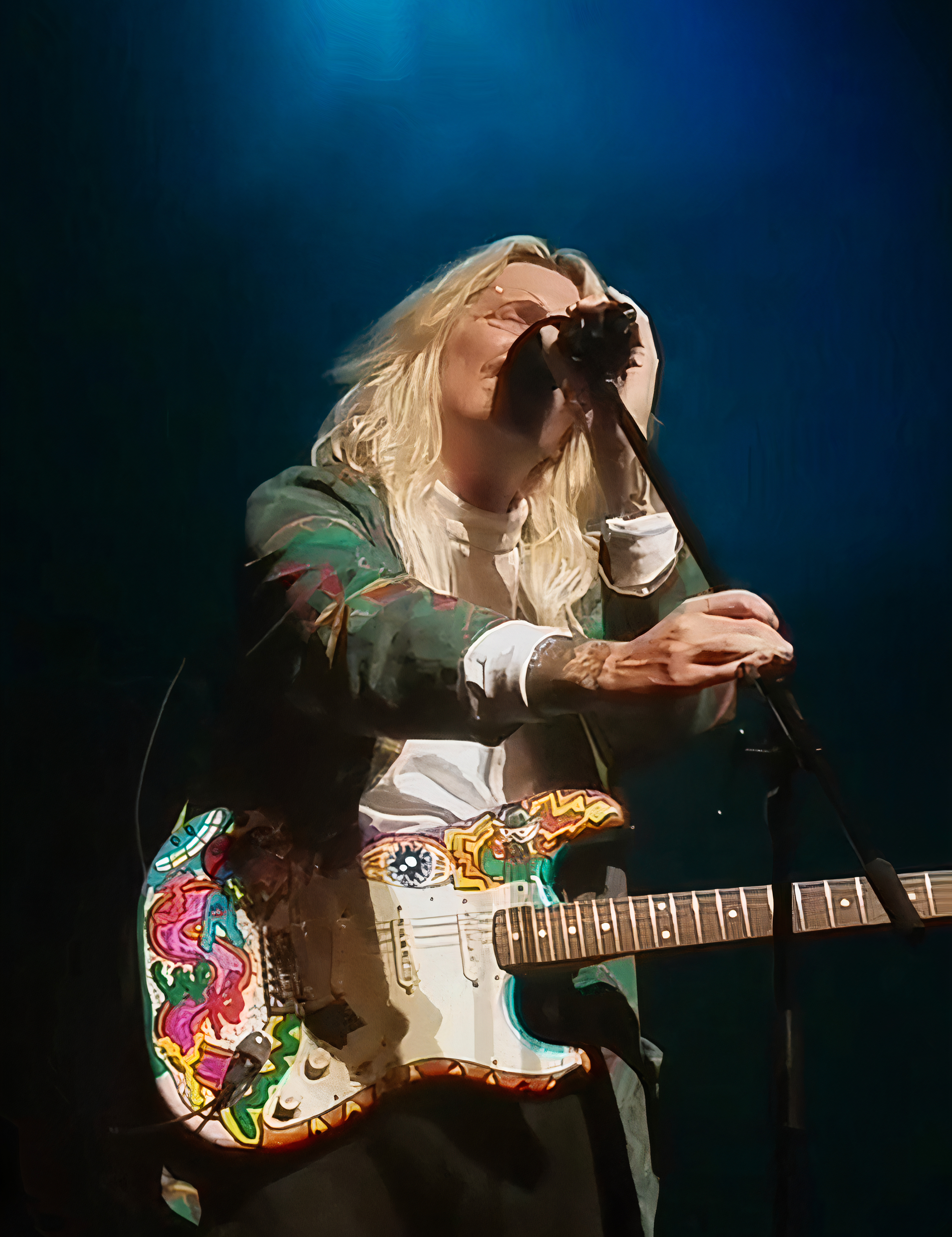

Background information
- Also known as: Johnny Utah
- Born: Jacob Lee-Nicholas Sullenger; December 23, 1995 (age 30); Fairfield, California, U.S.
- Origin: Philadelphia, Pennsylvania, U.S.
- Genres: Indie pop; lo-fi; slacker rock
- Occupations: Singer; songwriter; record producer
- Years active: 2016–present
- Label: Interscope
- Partner: Doja Cat (2019–2020)
- Website: jawny.com

Jacob Lee-Nicholas Sullenger (born December 23, 1995), known professionally as Jawny (stylized in all caps; formerly Johnny Utah), is an American singer, songwriter, and record producer. He first received recognition after the release of his 2019 single "Honeypie" and was signed to Interscope Records in January 2020. He made his major-label debut with the mixtape For Abby.

== Early life and education ==
He first learned how to play guitar at the age of 6 and began composing songs in his early teens. He briefly attended college where he studied nursing but dropped out to pursue music. He also managed a pizzeria in New Jersey to pay bills.

== Career ==
At the age of 20 in 2016, Sullenger moved to Philadelphia, Pennsylvania, where he began making music under the alias Johnny Utah. The pseudonym was a reference to Keanu Reeves' character in the 1991 film Point Break.

In January 2018, he released a self-titled EP via Z Tapes Records. He released several more singles that year, including "Folding Like Honey", "Patty", and "Crazy for Your Love". His songs also appeared on Spotify's "Bedroom Pop" playlist. In November 2018, the tracks were compiled by Z Tapes Records into a second EP entitled Big Dogs.

In April 2019, he released the single "Honeypie", which was later featured on Spotify's "Fresh Finds" and "Ultimate Indie" playlists. That exposure led to the song accruing millions of streams on the platform.

Sullenger was signed to Interscope Records in January 2020 and around that time changed his stage name to Jawny, a reference to a Philadelphia slang term. He also relocated to Los Angeles, California.

In February 2020, he released the single "Anything You Want". He released his Interscope debut project, For Abby, in October 2020. Jawny described the 10-track project as a mixtape rather than an EP. One of the collection's singles, "Sabotage", premiered at number 34 on the Billboard Alternative Airplay chart in January 2021.

== Personal life ==
Sullenger was in a romantic relationship with rapper and singer Doja Cat from August 2019 to February 2020.

== Discography ==
=== Albums ===
List of Albums with selected details
Title	Details
It's Never Fair, Always True	Released: March 3, 2023; Label: Interscope; Formats: Digital download

=== Mixtapes ===
List of mixtapes with selected details
Title	Details
For Abby	Released: October 27, 2020; Label: Interscope; Formats: Digital download

=== Extended plays ===
List of EPs with selected details
Title	Details
Johnny Utah (as Johnny Utah)	Released: January 15, 2018; Label: Z Tapes; Formats: Digital download, cassette
Big Dogs (as Johnny Utah)	Released: November 28, 2018; Label: Z Tapes; Formats: Digital download, cassette
The Story of Hugo	Released July 14, 2021; Label: Interscope; Formats: Digital download, cassette

=== Singles ===
List of singles with selected details
Title	Year	Peaks	Certifications	Album
Title	Year	US Alt	Certifications	Album
"Folding Like Honey"	2018	—		Big Dogs
"Really Meant"	2018	—		Big Dogs
"Honeypie"	2019	46	RIAA: Gold	For Abby
"4Tounce"	2019	—		For Abby
"Sabotage"	2020	34		For Abby
"Super Bad Mantra" (featuring Christian Blue)	2020	—		For Abby
"Anything You Want" (featuring Doja Cat)	2020	—		TBA
"Trigger of Love"	2021	—		TBA
"Best Thing"	2021	—		TBA
"Take It Back" (with Beck)	2022			
"Strawberry Chainsaw"	2022			
