= Emma Gatrill =

- Origin: United Kingdom
- Occupations: Instrumentalist, singer
- Instruments: Harp; clarinet; bass clarinet; saxophone; piano
- Years active: 2005–present
- Labels: Willkommen Records, Flau
- Website: www.emmagatrill.com

Emma Gatrill is a multi-instrumentalist based in Brighton, UK. She is primarily a harpist, clarinetist and singer.

Her debut album, Chapter I (2012), was a collection of harp songs accompanied by various members of the Willkommen Collective.

Gatrill released her second album, Cocoon, in 2017 via the Japanese label Flau. Critics noted that the arrangements drew from a much wider and often darker sonic palette – introducing vintage monosynths, drum machines and vibraphone. Stereogum's review compared her music to Julia Holter and Sufjan Stevens. The album also gained positive coverage in Clash Music, Drowned In Sound, Record Collector, The Line of Best Fit, GoldFlakePaint, and PRS for Music's M Magazine.

Gatrill has recorded and toured widely as a session musician, including playing clarinet with Laura Marling’s band on Glastonbury's Pyramid stage performance in 2011, Broken Social Scene on UK festival dates, recording a BBC Radio 6Music session with Samantha Crain and Willy Mason and toured with the likes of This Is The Kit (both as part of their horn section and as main support in January 2018), Sons of Noel and Adrian, Matthew And The Atlas, Moulettes, Laish, Rachael Dadd, Rozi Plain and more.

She played harp and clarinet on the 2011 Alessi's Ark album, Time Travel. She played the harp on Lucy Rose's 2017 album, Something's Changing, and sang on Nick Cave and Warren Ellis's soundtrack to the 2017 film Wind River.
