= Time Travel (Alessi's Ark album) =

Studio album by Alessi's Ark
- Released: 25 April 2011
- Genre: Folk, pop
- Label: Bella Union
- Producer: Alessi Laurent-Marke, David Wrench

Alessi's Ark chronology
Soul Proprietor (2010)	Time Travel (2011)	The Still Life (2013)

Professional ratings
Review scores
Source	Rating
BBC	Favourable link
The Guardian	link
Allmusic	link

Time Travel is the second album by British singer-songwriter Alessi Laurent-Marke and her first album for independent label Bella Union. It was recorded in Brighton's Electric Studios with Willkommen Collective’s Marcus Hamblett and at Bryn Derwen in Wales with David Wrench.

The songs from the album were inspired by the long tour that came after the release of Alessi's Ark's debut album, Notes from the Treehouse, with Laurent-Marke explaining "this is a collection of songs that have mostly grown from travelling and touring, away from the familiarity of home, family and friends". The album title came from the long hours of recording every day: "In Brighton, we did 12 hour days and had no idea what was going on in the outside world. In Wales, there was no phone signal, and it felt far away from everything."

The cover of the album features a photo of Laurent-Marke in an old ice cream van which she discovered in Morecambe after playing in nearby Lancaster. “Those old towns are like the land that time forgot, and I got talking to the owner of this beautiful ice cream van, she had a wartime haircut and a beautiful dress and I couldn’t work out where she’d landed from. I later contacted her about having the van on the cover and she was up for it”.

The album was well-received critically with the BBC's review calling it an album that "sails well above the current flood of increasingly desperate folk wannabes, and weaves a modest magic that is hard to pinpoint, yet even harder to resist" and The Guardian writing that the songs on Time Travel "reveal a talent that's on the verge of becoming something special".

== Track listing ==
All songs by Alessi Laurent-Marke unless otherwise noted.

1. "Kind Of Man" – 1:58
2. "Wire" – 2:19
3. "On The Plains" – 2:48
4. "Must Have Grown" – 2:00
5. "Time Travel" – 3:53
6. "The Fever" – 1:35
7. "Blanket" – 1:15
8. "Maybe I Know" – 2:41 (Jeff Barry, Ellie Greenwich)
9. "Stalemate" – 3:19
10. "The Robot" – 2:44
11. "Run" – 1:32
12. "The Bird Song" – 2:27

=== iTunes Bonus Tracks ===
1. "The Moth Song" – 0:55 (UK only)
2. "Bluffs" – 2:00 (US only)

== Credits ==
- Alessi Laurent-Marke – Vocals, Guitar, Drums
- Marcus Hamblett – Electric Guitar, Double Bass, Tenor Horn, Banjo, Vocals
- Will Calderbank – Cello, Piano
- Alistair Strachan – Cornet
- Jamie Backhouse – Electric Guitar, Acoustic Guitar
- Helen Whitaker – Flute
- Adam Newton – Double Bass, Electric Bass
- Sam Nadel – Drums
- Jacob Richardson – Acoustic Guitar, Slide Guitar, Vocals
- Ruth de Turberville – Cello, Vocals
- Daniel Green – Drums
- David Wrench – Piano, Electric Guitar
- Emma Gatrill – Clarinet, Harp
- Jo Burke – Violin
- Cathy Cardin – Vocals
