= The Still Life (album) =

Studio album by Alessi's Ark
- Released: 15 April 2013
- Genre: Folk, pop
- Length: 31:50
- Label: Bella Union
- Producer: Alessi Laurent-Marke, Andy LeMaster, Nic Nell

Alessi's Ark chronology
| Time Travel (2011) | The Still Life (2013) | Love Is the Currency (2017) |

Professional ratings
Aggregate scores
| Source | Rating |
|---|---|
| Metacritic | 68/100 |
Review scores
| Source | Rating |
| AllMusic | 4/5 stars |
| This Is Fake DIY | 7/10 |
| MusicOMH | 3.5/5 stars |
| Consequence of Sound | 3.5/5 stars |

The Still Life is the third album by Alessi's Ark. The album was produced by Andy LeMaster in his studio in Athens, Georgia over a three-week period and Nic Nell in his London studio. It features 12 songs written by Laurent-Marke, including re-recordings of two songs (Money and Pinewoods) from the Rough Trade bonus CD that came with her debut album Notes from the Treehouse, and a cover of The National's Afraid of Everyone. It was released on 15 April 2013 in the UK and on 30 April 2013 in the US.

Plug in Music praised the album, calling it "a rich 13-song collection, imbued with a reflective sparkle by young singer/songwriter Alessi Laurent-Marke".

== Track listing ==
All tracks are written by Alessi Laurent-Marke, except Afraid of Everyone by Matt Berninger and Aaron Dessner

| No. | Title | Length |
|---|---|---|
| 1. | "Tin Smithing" | 1:45 |
| 2. | "Veins are Blue" | 2:21 |
| 3. | "The Rain" | 3:17 |
| 4. | "The Good Song" | 1:27 |
| 5. | "Big Dipper" | 3:12 |
| 6. | "Afraid of Everyone" | 3:20 |
| 7. | "Those Waves" | 3:01 |
| 8. | "Whatever Makes You Happy" | 2:09 |
| 9. | "Sans Balance" | 2:55 |
| 10. | "Mountain" | 1:17 |
| 11. | "Hands in the Sink" | 2:18 |
| 12. | "Money" | 1:37 |
| 13. | "Pinewoods" | 3:11 |

iTunes bonus track (US only)
| No. | Title | Length |
|---|---|---|
| 14. | "Big Dipper (acoustic)" | 3:12 |
