= Bluffer's Guide to the Flight Deck =

Studio album by Flotation Toy Warning
- Released: August 17, 2004
- Recorded: 2004
- Genre: Indie pop, neo-psychedelia, chamber pop, dream pop, space pop
- Length: 71:36
- Label: Pointy, Misra, Talitres
- Producer: Steve Swindon, Flotation Toy Warning

Flotation Toy Warning chronology
The Special Tape (2002)	Bluffer's Guide to the Flight Deck (2004)	The Machine That Made Us (2017)

Professional ratings
Review scores
Source	Rating
Allmusic	4/5 stars
Delusions Of Adequacy	(9/10)
Pitchfork Media	(7.4/10)
Stylus	B+

Bluffer's Guide to the Flight Deck is the 2004 debut album released by Flotation Toy Warning.

== Track listing ==
All lyrics are written by Paul Carter; all music is composed by Flotation Toy Warning

No.	Title	Length
1.	"Happy 13"	4:51
2.	"Popstar Researching Oblivion"	6:13
3.	"Losing Carolina: For Drusky"	7:56
4.	"Made From Tiny Boxes"	1:29
5.	"Donald Pleasance"	9:27
6.	"Fire Engine on Fire, Pt. 1"	6:51
7.	"Fire Engine on Fire, Pt. 2"	6:55
8.	"Even Fantastica"	7:28
9.	"Happiness Is on the Outside"	3:28
10.	"How the Plains Left Me Flat"	15:39
Total length:		71:36

Bonus tracks on the Talitres Bandcamp release
No.	Title	Length
11.	"This Is Not A Lifesaver"	3:53
12.	"Even Fantastica (Goodbye To The Flight Deck Mix)"	11:30

== Personnel ==
- Paul Carter - Lead Vocals, Samples, Programming
- Ben Clay - Guitar, Bass
- Colin Coxall - Drums, Octopad
- Nainesh Shah - Guitar, Bass, Vocals
- Vicky West - Keyboards, Samples, Vocals
- Recorded by Steve Swindon at The Old Clothes Factory.
- Mixed by Brian O'Shaughnessy and Flotation Toy Warning at Bark Studio.
- Mastered by Nick Robbins at Soundmastering.
- Produced by Steve Swindon and Flotation Toy Warning.
- All songs written by Paul Carter and Ben Clay with Flotation Toy Warning.
- Lyrics by Paul Carter. Brass and string arrangements by Vicky West.
- Sleeve design by Vicky West.
- Dominic Glover - Trumpet, Flugel
- Mat Colman - Trombone
- Gwen Cheeseman - Violin
- Anne Marie Kirby - Violin
- John Greswell - Viola
- Sarah Kaldor - Cello
- Rhys Llewellyn - Drums on Fire Engine on Fire, Pt 1
