= Moulettes =

English art rock band

- Also known as: Hannah Moule & The Moulettes
- Origin: Glastonbury, Somerset, England
- Genres: Art rock, chamber pop, progressive folk, progressive rock, folk rock, psychedelic folk, experimental rock
- Years active: 2002–present
- Labels: Craft Pop, Navigator Records
- Members: Hannah Miller; Raevennan Husbandes; Oliver Austin; Mike Simmonds; Jules Arthur
- Past members: Ruth Skipper; Ted Dwane; Robert Skipper; Anisa Arslanagic; Georgina Leach; Jim Mortimore; Rob Arcari; Marcus Hamblett; Kate Young; Emma Gatrill; Eliza Jaye; T.S.Idiot; Lee Westwood
- Website: moulettes.co.uk

Moulettes are an English art rock band that combines elements of rock, progressive, folk and pop music. Moulettes are multi-instrumentalists who experiment with the interplay between electric and acoustic instruments through effects and distortion. Led by either a 4, 5 or 6 string cello; the band uses three-part vocal harmony and often incorporates orchestral and progressive elements into their music.

== Origins ==
Moulettes was formed in 2002 in Glastonbury, England by Hannah Miller (vocals, cello), Ruth Skipper (vocals, bassoon), Robert Skipper, Oliver Austin (drums, vocals) and Ted Dwane (bass guitar). Miller, Ruth Skipper, Robert Skipper, Austin and Dwane met at school.

== History ==
=== Early years: 2002–2009 ===
During and after having left college, the band formed Miller, Ruth Skipper, Robert Skipper, Austin, Dwane and eventually Leach were playing regularly in London and Manchester.

Soon after, Dwane, Robert Skipper and Leach left. To document the songs that had been played live during that period, Miller, Ruth Skipper, and Austin became a newly arranged three-piece band. It was on this foundation that the sound for the first album was made. Austin, Ruth Skipper, and Miller also helped found the Sotones Music co-operative label in Southampton and released their first split single, "Wilderness", with Peter Lyons.

=== Moulettes: 2009–2011 ===
The Moulettes album was recorded in Winchester at Valley Studios where Robert Skipper and Austin originally met. Near the end of the sessions, Leach announced her return and recorded on several of the tracks. These last stages of the sessions also saw the recruitment of Rob Arcari and a guest vocal appearance from Emma Richardson of Band of Skulls on "Requiem". The band toured the record in the UK and Europe as a quintet.

=== The Bear's Revenge: 2011–2012 ===
The band returned to Winchester to record second album The Bear's Revenge with Ben Startup, and with Joe Gibb co-producing. The sessions included the return of Dwane on double bass and the addition of Jim Mortimore, Laura Hockenhull, and Faye Houston. Guest appearances include Liz Green on "Blood And Thunder", Banjoist Matt Menefee and Ríoghnach Connolly (folk singer, flute and whistle).

Miller, Ruth Skipper, Austin, Leach, Arcari and Mortimore toured for the album. During this period Moulettes played festivals, including Cropredy, and toured with the Levellers, The Crazy World of Arthur Brown, Mumford and Sons and a support show with Seasick Steve at the Hammersmith Apollo. Leach and Arcari left the band by the end of the album tour.

=== Constellations: 2013–2015 ===
The band's third album Constellations was released on 2 June 2014 on Navigator Records. Joe Gibb returned to co-produce the album with band member Austin. Special guests include: Herbie Flowers, Arthur Brown, Richardson, Blaine Harrison, The Unthanks, Nick Pynn, Gatrill, Marcus Hamblett, Dan Smith, Houston, Campbell Austin, Hockenhull, Matt Gest, Arslanagic, Simmonds, Bjorn Dahlberg, and Laura Impallomeni.

Miller, Ruth Skipper, Austin, Mortimore and Arslanagic began to tour the album and were joined by Gatrill, Young and Eliza Jaye at different stages.

Founding member Rob Skipper died on 3 October 2014 from a heroin overdose shortly after moving to Brighton.

=== Preternatural: 2015–2017 ===
Moulettes' fourth album Preternatural saw the addition of Raevennan Husbandes on guitar and vocals. The album's lyrical content deals with strange creatures and the natural world. It was produced by the band, mixed by Jim Mortimore, and recorded in the home studio of Malcolm Mortimore after a headline tour in the UK, Germany, Netherlands, and Canada. Moulettes continued to tour Canada and all over Europe. In June 2016, Ruth Skipper left.

=== Xenolalia Interactive Book with QR codes : 2018–present ===
Xenolalia (2021) contains 11 songs re-imagined five ways with five different ensembles—a cappella, electric, strings, electronic, and horns—over five separate albums. It was released as a designed graphical book with QR codes that lead to an online player on the bands website.

== Musicianship ==
Moulettes are a band of multi-instrumentalists who experiment with the interplay between electric and acoustic instruments through effects and distortion. Led by either a 4, 5 or 6 string cello; the band uses three-part vocal harmony and often incorporates orchestral and progressive elements into their music.

== Personnel ==
The current lineup is Hannah Miller (cello, vocals, guitar), Oliver Austin (drums, guitar, synthesizer), Raevennan Husbandes (vocals, guitar), Jules Arthur (synthesizer, viola, backing vocals), Mikey Simmonds (violin, viola, nyckelharpa, backing vocals)

They occasionally play with a chamber orchestra, or in larger ensembles which include Georgina Leach (violin), Mikey Simmonds (violin), Anisa Arslanagic, Emma Gatrill (harp), Kate Young (violin), Eliza Jaye (violin and guitar), Marcus Hamblett (guitar, brass), Rob Arcari (percussion), Laura Hockenhull (vocals) and Faye Houston (vocals).

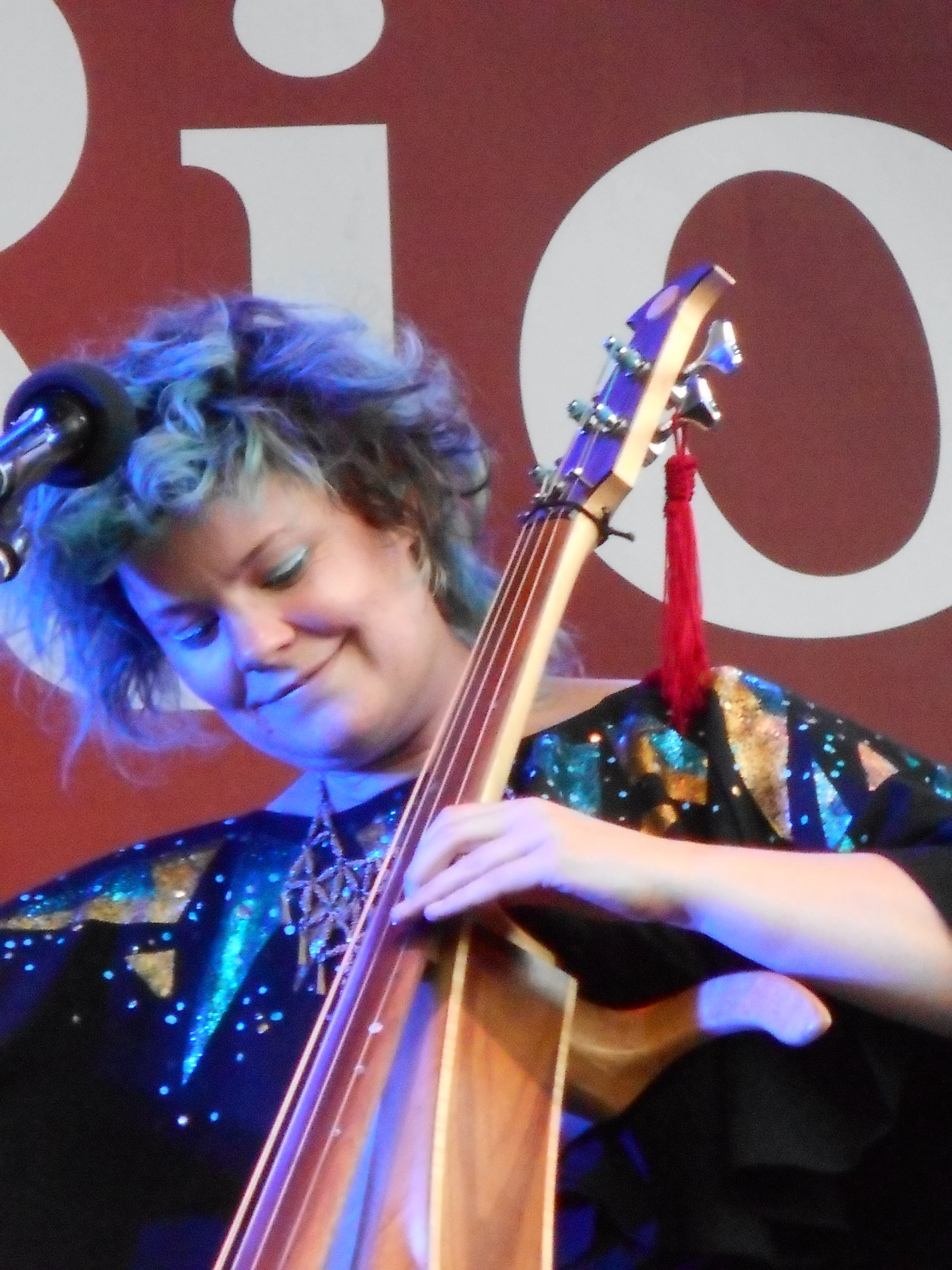
Hannah Miller

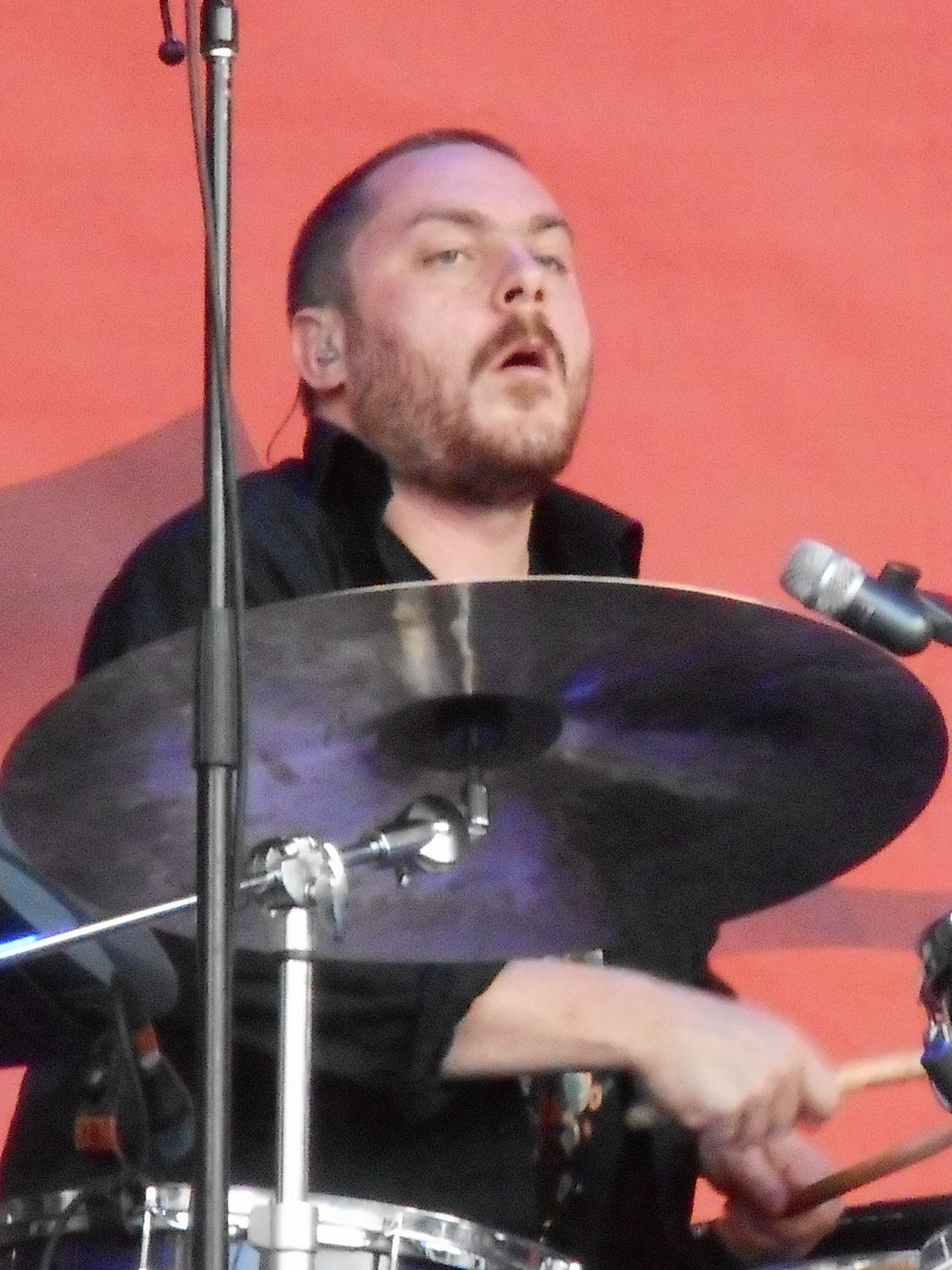
Oliver Austin

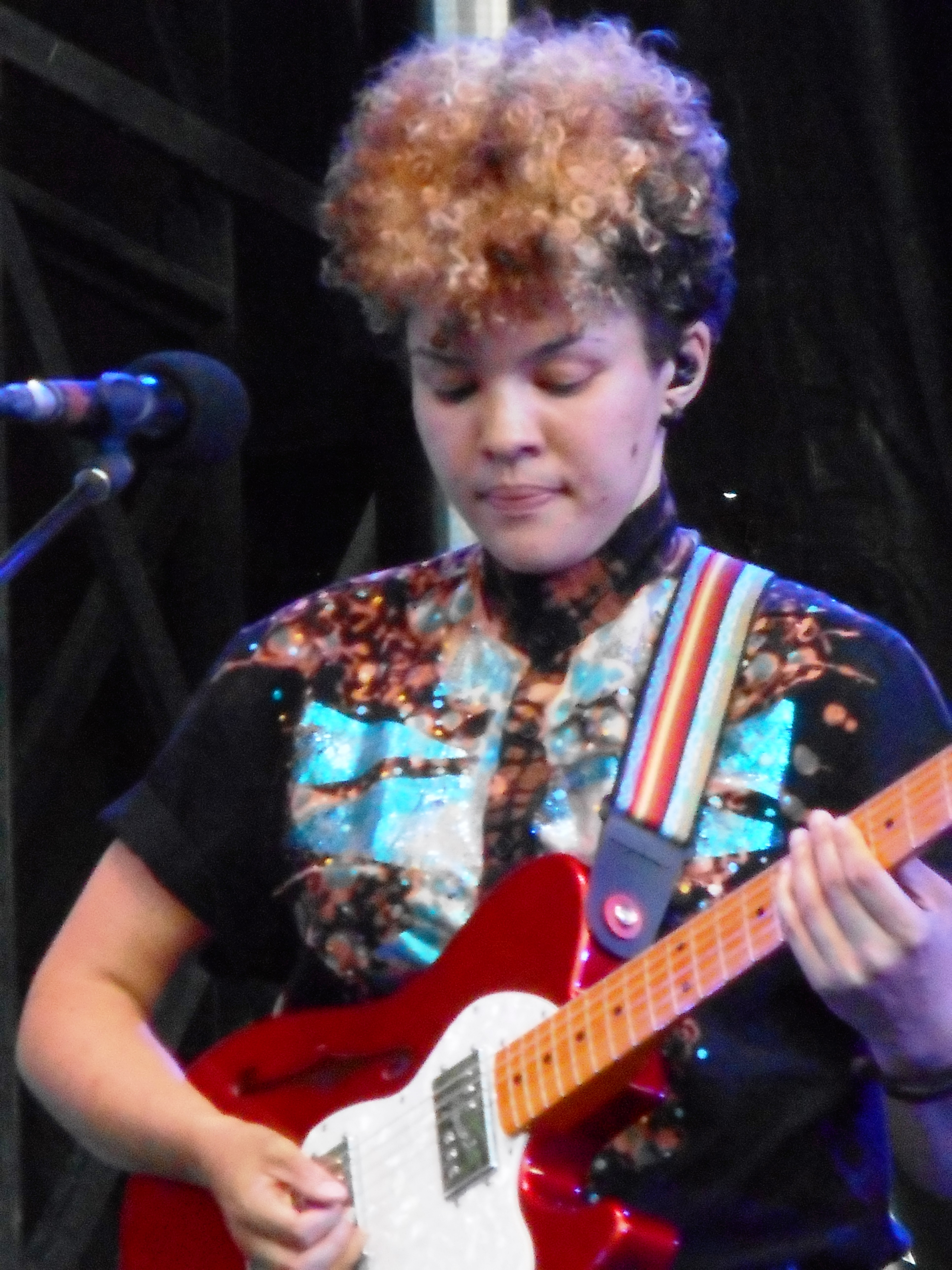
Raevennan Husbandes

== Discography ==
=== As Moulettes ===
==== Albums ====
- Moulettes (Balling The Jack, 2010)
- The Bear's Revenge (Balling The Jack, 2012)
- Constellations (Navigator, 2014)
- Preternatural (C.R.A.F.T Pop, 2016)
  - Preternatural: European Special Edition (C.R.A.F.T Pop, 2017)
- Xenolalia (Rose Hill Records, 2021)

==== Compilation albums ====
- Remixes From Back Catalogue (self-released, 2014)
- Journey Through The Mouletiverse (Sotones, 2021)

==== EPs ====
- Songs From St. Margaret's (Red Deer Club, 2007)
- Moulettes (self-released, 2008)
