= The Machine That Made Us =

Studio album by Flotation Toy Warning
- Released: 16 June, 2017
- Genres: Neo-psychedelia, indie rock, space rock, chamber pop, dream pop, progressive pop
- Length: 61:19
- Label: Talitres

Flotation Toy Warning chronology
Bluffer's Guide to the Flight Deck (2004)	The Machine That Made Us (2017)

Singles from The Machine That Made Us
- 1. "When the Boat Comes Inside Your House / A Season Underground" Released: April 2011; 2. "King of Foxgloves" Released: June 2017

The Machine That Made Us is the second album by Flotation Toy Warning, released in 2017.

== Track listing ==
All lyrics are written by Paul Carter; all music is composed by Flotation Toy Warning.

No.	Title	Length
1.	"Controlling the Sea"	3:27
2.	"Due to Adverse Weather Conditions All of My Heroes Have Surrendered"	6:38
3.	"Everything That Is Difficult Will Come to an End"	7:49
4.	"A Season Underground"	4:59
5.	"I Quite Like It When He Sings"	7:30
6.	"King of Foxgloves"	5:47
7.	"When the Boat Comes Inside Your House"	5:20
8.	"Driving Under the Influence of Loneliness"	2:23
9.	"To Live for Longer Slides"	4:50
10.	"The Moongoose Analogue"	12:36
Total length:		61:19
