= Juarez Machado =

Brazilian painter (1941–2026)

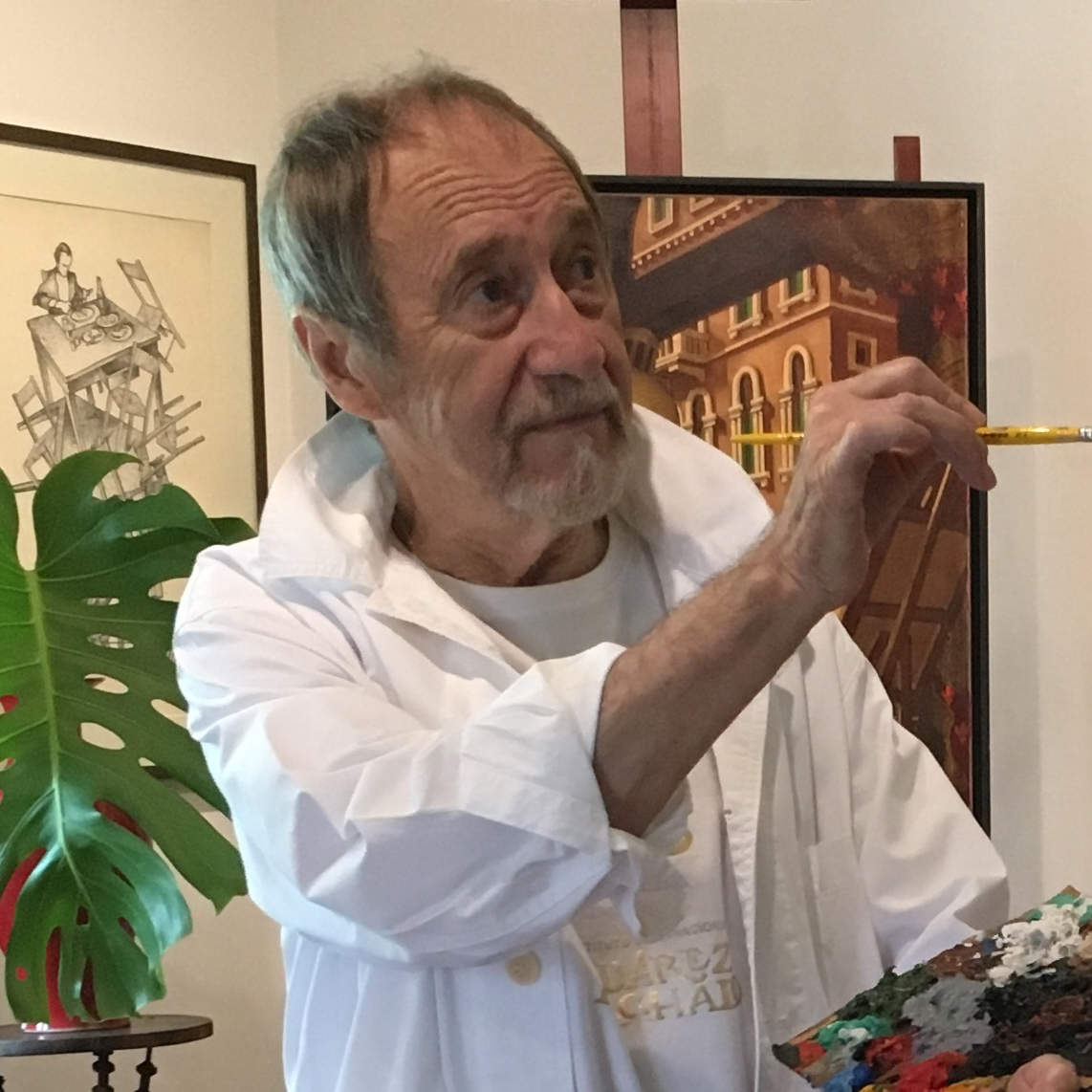
Juarez Machado in 2018.

Juarez Machado (March 16, 1941 – October 6, 2026) was a Brazilian painter.

== Life and career ==
Machado studied fine arts at the School of Art in the state of Paraná, in the city of Curitiba. He worked in illustration, theatre, television, sculpture, and gravure. from 1986 until his death, he lived in Paris.

Machado died on October 6, 2026, at the age of 85.

== Anecdote ==
Machado influenced Jean-Pierre Jeunet's films from his own words. Three of his paintings have been used by the French music band Jack the Ripper as covers for their studio albums.
