= Bedroom Bound =

EP by Alessi's Ark
- Released: 2007
- Genres: Folk, pop
- Label: Zooey

Alessi's Ark chronology
Bedroom Bound (2007)	The Horse EP (2008)

Bedroom Bound is an EP by British singer-songwriter Alessi Laurent-Marke featuring songs she had recorded at home in her bedroom and was sold independently through her MySpace page. All the songs, bar "My Bedroom", were later re-recorded in the studio with "The Horse" becoming her first release for Virgin Records. The new version of "For One Year" was an iTunes bonus track with her debut album Notes From The Treehouse, while "The Crown" was the b-side to the "Over The Hill" single and the re-recorded "Let's Race" was included on The Horse EP.

== Track listing ==
All songs written by Alessi Laurent-Marke

1. "My Bedroom" – 2:31
2. "The Horse" – 1:50
3. "For One Year" – 3:19
4. "The Crown" – 1:53
5. "Let's Race" – 2:36
