= Alessi's Ark =

English singer-songwriter

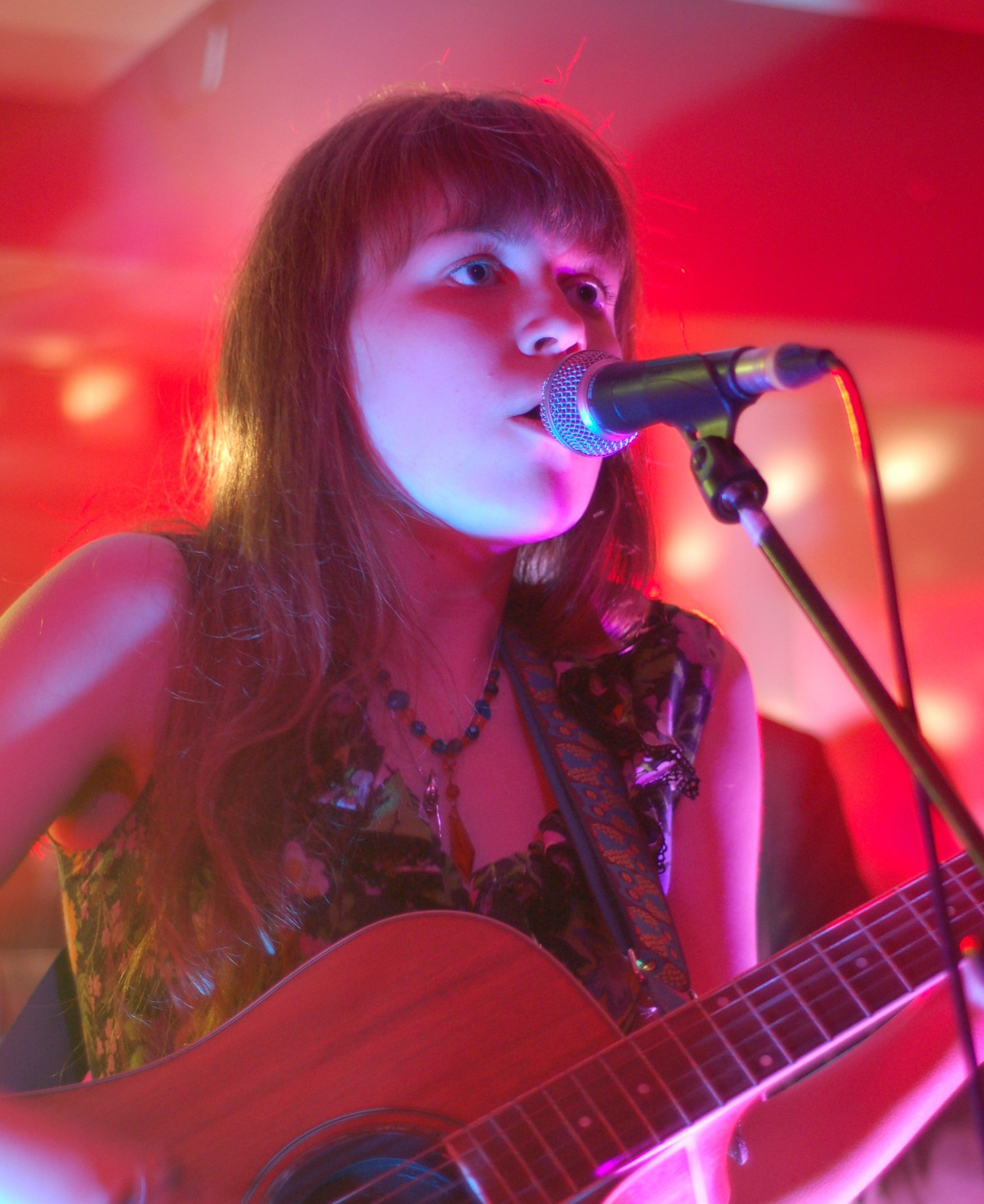
- Alessi Laurent-Marke performing with Alessi's Ark

Background information
- Also known as: Alessi Laurent-Marke
- Born: 30 June 1990 (age 36)
- Origin: Hammersmith, London, England
- Genres: Folk, pop
- Occupation: Singer-songwriter
- Years active: 2007–present
- Labels: Virgin; Bella Union
- Members: Jamie Backhouse; Jason Santos
- Past members: Ben Lovett

Alessi's Ark is the musical project of Alessi Laurent-Marke (born 30 June 1990), an English singer-songwriter.

== Career ==
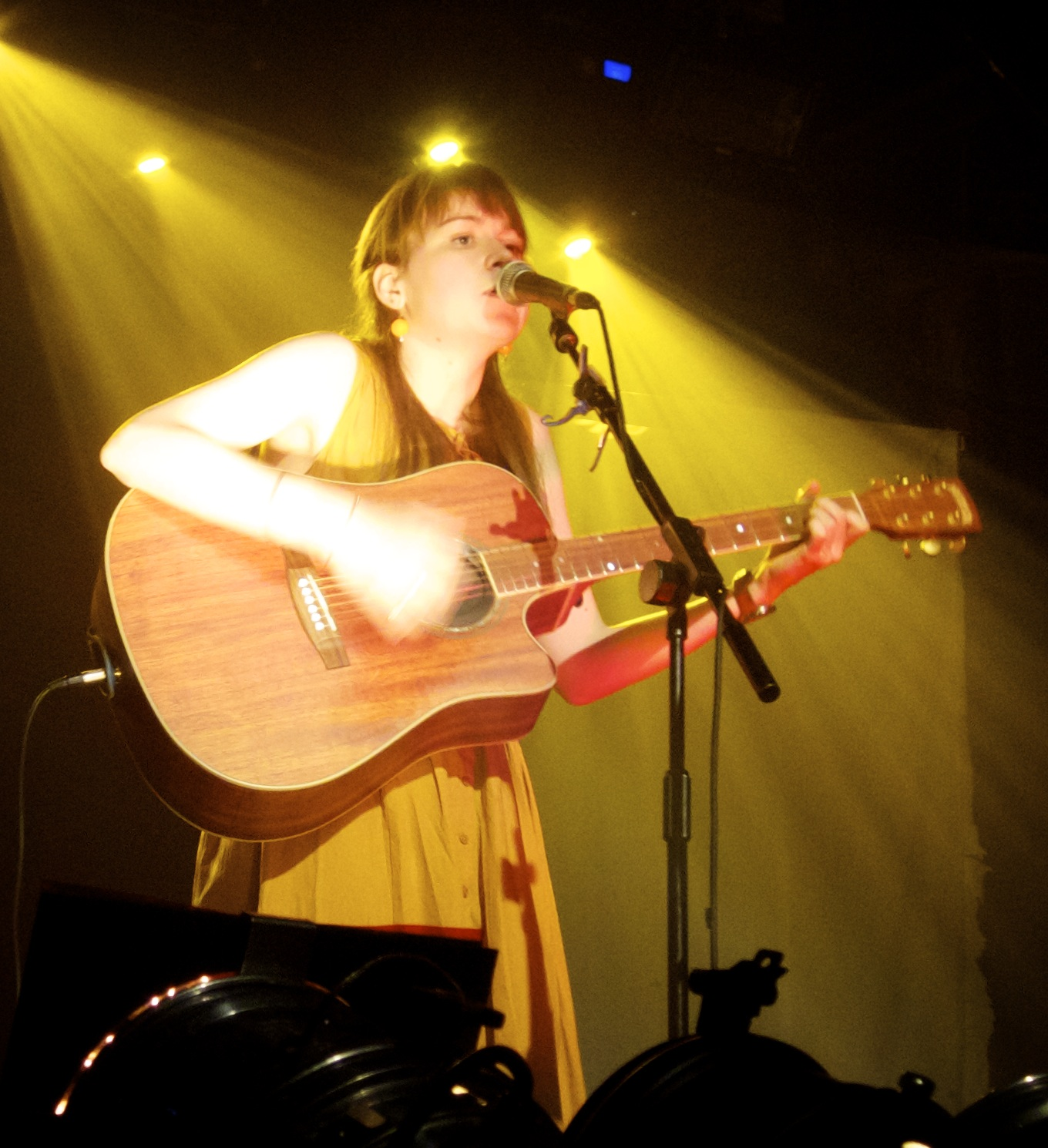
Alessi's Ark performing at Heaven, a London nightclub, in November 2011

Named after the Italian design company, Alessi Laurent-Marke grew up in Hammersmith, London where her father, Alan Marke, is a television producer who has worked on TV shows such as Modern Toss, Snuff Box and Shooting Stars and is also the managing director of TV production company Channel X.

She first became interested in music when her mother gave her a copy of Graham Nash's 1971 album Songs for Beginners. She took up the drums at the age of 11 when her secondary school required students to take up an instrument, her choice inspired by seeing drummer Meg White perform with the White Stripes at a concert at Alexandra Palace. Her drum teacher played locally in different bands and through this she began going to see him and various bands live with her dad, sometimes going to as many as four shows a week. This led to her starting her own fanzine called Brain Bulletin (which now continues in the form of a blog) in which she wrote about her favourite bands, books and films. Inspired by a family friend in New York, who wrote a fanzine called The Curse, she distributed it at concerts, through a local record shop and at a launderette on Shepherd's Bush Road.

As part of the coursework for her music GCSE she had to compose the music and lyrics for a song. Through the basic chords she had learnt fooling around on her sister's guitar and "the combination of the poetry and the stories that I had been writing for my fanzine" she composed the song Glendora (which eventually ended up on her debut album), which her music teacher encouraged her to sing at the school assembly. Discovering a new passion for writing and performing, she decided to leave school to pursue music at age 16. Although supported by her parents, she promised them that she would return to school after one year if nothing came of it. During this time she quickly gained a following with her demos posted on her MySpace and self-released an EP called Bedroom Bound that she sold through her page (on her independent label Zooey). To avoid confusion with the music act the Alessi Brothers, her mother suggested calling herself Alessi's Ark: "I liked the idea of a boat, where everybody is welcome, even friends that are geographically far away – we are together." Booking as many shows as she could and playing "anywhere", representatives from record labels Heavenly Records and EMI soon saw her performing and offered her a deal. On the eve of her 17th birthday she signed to Virgin Records, a division of EMI.

Asked who her dream producer would be for her major label debut, Laurent-Marke said Mike Mogis, producer of Rilo Kiley and member of Bright Eyes. She met up with him in London after a Bright Eyes show at the Shepherd's Bush Empire in early 2008 and travelled to Nebraska to record the album at Mogis' and Conor Oberst's studio in Omaha.

The resulting album, Notes From The Treehouse, was released in May 2009, featuring full band versions of some of the songs from her Bedroom Bound EP, as well as newer compositions such as The Dog and Hummingbird. The album also featured many musicians that inspired her to begin making music including Jake Bellows of Neva Dinova and Nate Walcott from Bright Eyes.

Following the release of the album, Alessi's Ark continued to play live around the UK and also played support to a diverse range of artists such as Laura Marling, Mariee Sioux, Emilíana Torrini and Cerys Matthews, as well as playing the Bandstand stage at Neil Young's Hyde Park show in London in June. Riverside Studios in Hammersmith also played host to an exhibition of her drawings inspired by her songs, called Handmade, which ran from 20 August to 27 September 2009.

In February 2010, Alessi's Ark left Virgin and signed with independent label Bella Union. Her first release on Bella Union was an EP called Soul Proprietor which was released on 5 April 2010. On 25 April 2011 she released her second album Time Travel. which was recorded in Brighton's Electric Studios with Willkommen Collective's Marcus Hamblett and at Bryn Derwen in Wales with David Wrench. The album was well received by critics and fans alike with the BBC's review calling it an album that "sails well above the current flood of increasingly desperate folk wannabes, and weaves a modest magic that is hard to pinpoint, yet even harder to resist" and The Guardian writing that the songs on Time Travel "reveal a talent that's on the verge of becoming something special". The live shows in support of the album saw Alessi's Ark once again joining Laura Marling on her US tour in September 2011.

In March 2012, Laurent-Marke made an appearance singing vocals on the debut release by Young Colossus, a limited edition six song soundtrack by Orlando Weeks (The Maccabees) and producer Nic Nell, which came with a 24-page illustrated picture book, and was available exclusively through the band's website. She later made a live appearance with Young Colossus for a one-off show at Corsica Studios in Elephant & Castle, London on 5 September 2012. Alessi's Ark's debut album, Notes from the Treehouse, was also released in the US on 18 September 2012, preceded by a competition to design a new cover for the album which was won by Evalie Wagner.

The third album from Alessi's Ark, The Still Life, was released on 15 April 2013 on Bella Union records. The album was produced by Andy LeMaster and recorded in Athens, Georgia and by Nic Nell in London. Alessi released her fourth album Love is the Currency on 27 October 2017 and toured in the U.S., Japan and Europe in 2018.

In January 2021, the members of Alessi's Ark joined English rock band The Walking Trees alongside French model and singer Loic Williams and British musician Maxi Mawdsley. The band released their first single, Southside aLive, that same month.

== Discography ==
- Bedroom Bound EP (2007)
- The Horse EP (2008)
- Friend Ships (split EP with Thunder Power) (2009)
- "Over The Hill" (single) (2009)
- Notes from the Treehouse (2009)
- Live Session (2009)
- Soul Proprietor (2010)
- Time Travel (2011)
- The Still Life (2013)
- Love Is The Currency (2017)
- Anchory (2024)

== Vocal appearances ==
- "They May Already Be Dreaming" (Neva Dinova) (2008)
- "Mama I'm Swollen" (Cursive) (2009)
- "Young Colossus" (2012)
- "Somewhere Else Inside Your Head" and "Friend of a Friend" (Kyte) (2013)
- Son Be Wise (Ralfe Band) (2013)
- We Resonate (Rachael Dadd) (2015)
- Southside aLive! (The Walking Trees) (2021)
- Don't Ask Me Why (The Walking Trees) (2021)
- Sun Goes Down (The Walking Trees) (2022)
