= Marcus Hamblett =

English musician and producer

- Born: Marcus Hamblett
- Occupation: Musician
- Instruments: Guitar, double bass, cornet, tenor horn, synthesizer
- Years active: 2005–present

Marcus Hamblett is an English musician and record producer. Music from his solo album, Concrete, has been played on BBC Radio 3's Late Junction shows by Mara Carlyle, Nick Luscombe and Max Reinhardt and on BBC 6 Music by Tom Robinson. The Quietus said his album, "could be called post-rock if it didn't also sound pre-rock, or maybe as if rock had never happened and folk, modern jazz and the classical avant-garde had merged into a stream of hip, innovative music to soundtrack the changes and discontents of the second half of the twentieth century instead, and Joe Meek had dug John Cage."

He is also a session musician, receiving credit for playing a variety of instruments (double bass, synthesizers, guitar, trumpet etc.) on albums by Laura Marling, The Staves, Lucy Rose, Villagers, Fear of Men, Peggy Sue, Bear's Den, Woodpecker Wooliams, Rachael Dadd, Landshapes and Rozi Plain. His live session work has involved touring with Sarah Blasko, Broken Social Scene, Olympia and James Holden. He is a member of the Willkommen Collective and the bands Sons of Noel and Adrian and Eyes & No Eyes.

In June 2015, Hamblett collaborated with modular synthesist James Holden and jazz drummer Mark Holub. The project was recorded at Maida Vale Studios for BBC Radio 3. Hamblett performed at Latitude Festival in July 2015 with drummer Thomas Heather, which was also recorded and broadcast on BBC Radio 3.

In February 2016, Hamblett announced a European tour in support of LNZNDRF, featuring Scott and Bryan Devendorf of The National and Ben Lanz of Beirut. Hamblett joined the band on stage for their lengthy improvised encores. In April 2017, Hamblett toured Europe in support of Timber Timbre and joined them on cornet.

In a June 2017 interview with Record Collector magazine Hamblett revealed that his second solo LP features guest contributions from Colin Stetson, Mathieu Charbonneau (of Timber Timbre), Ben Lanz (of Beirut and The National), Kate Stables (of This Is The Kit), James Holden, Etienne Jaumet (of Zombie Zombie) and Colin Webster (of Sex Swing).

== Selected discography ==
- Laura Marling – A Creature I Don't Know – electric guitar, tenor horn, banjo, mandolin, backing vocals
- Laura Marling – Live From York Minster – electric guitar, tenor horn, banjo, mandolin, backing vocals
- Bear's Den – Islands – synths
- Bear's Den – Red Earth & Pouring Rain – synths, drum machine, programming, tenor horn, flugelhorn, cornet
- Bear's Den – So That's You Might Hear Me – synths
- James Holden & The Animal Spirits – The Animal Spirits – cornet
- James Holden – Imagine This Is a High Dimensional Space of All Possibilities – double bass, electric guitar
- The Staves – Home Alone, Too – brass
- The Staves – Good Woman – brass
- Lucy Rose – No Words Left – synths
- Lucy Rose – Something's Changing – brass
- Villagers – Ada (extended version) – electronics
- Rachael Dadd – Flux – guitar, bass, brass, synths, produced
- Billie Marten – Drop Cherries – electric guitar, brass, synths, Mellotron
- Bess Atwell - Already, Always - brass
- Bess Atwell - Light Sleeper - brass
