= Flotation Toy Warning =

English indie rock band

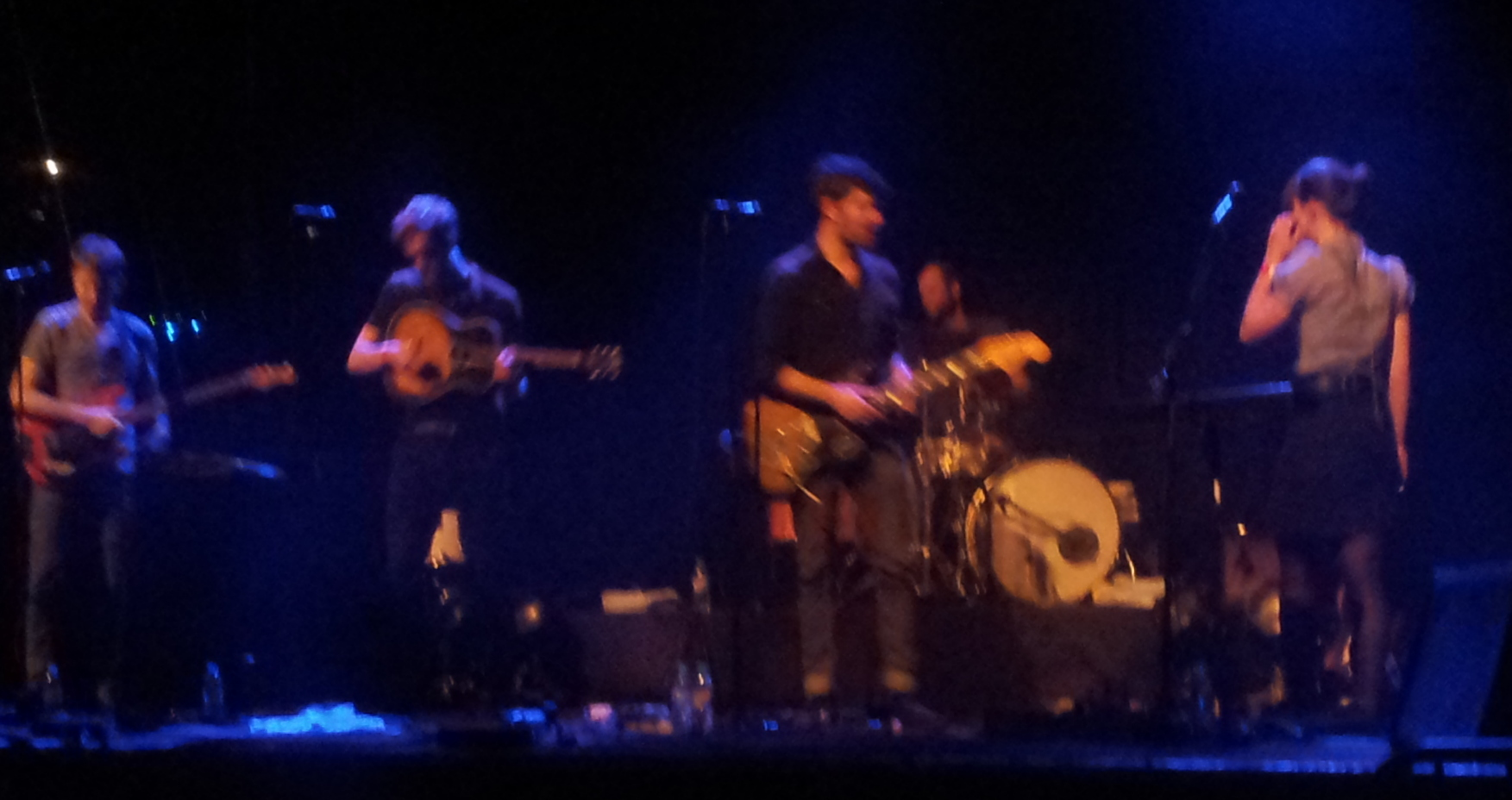
- Flotation Toy Warning in 2013

Background information
- Origin: London, England, United Kingdom
- Genres: Neo-psychedelia; indie rock; ork-pop; space rock; dream pop; ambient pop
- Years active: 1997–present
- Labels: Talitres, Pointy Records, Misra Records
- Members: Paul Carter; Ben Clay; Nainesh Shah; Vicky West; Steve Swindon
- Past members: Colin Coxall

Flotation Toy Warning is an English indie rock band from London, UK formed in 2001. The band is made up of frontman and lead vocalist Paul Carter, guitar and bass guitar players Ben Clay and Nainesh Shah, drummer Steve Swindon, and keyboardist Vicky West. Flotation Toy Warning's debut album, Bluffer's Guide to the Flight Deck, was released in September 2004 on the London-based Pointy Records to critical acclaim.

== History ==
The band released two EPs on Pointy Records, I Remember Trees in July 2002 and The Special Tape in November 2002.

Flotation Toy Warning's debut album, Bluffer's Guide to the Flight Deck, was released in September 2004 on the London-based Pointy Records, with an American release following in August 2005 on Misra Records as well as a French release on Talitres Records.

Paul Carter wrote and recorded vocals/lyrics/choirs on the track "I, Ignorist" for the Fitzcarraldo Sessions – an offshoot project by the French band Jack the Ripper. This track is now available on the album We Hear Voices.

The Flotation Toy Warning track "Happy 13" was used by Channel 5 to advertise CSI and The Mentalist in an ident entitled 'The Drama Continues'.

Flotation Toy Warning toured France, Belgium, Switzerland, and Austria in October and November 2011.

Former Flotation Toy Warning drummer Colin Coxall played drums as part of the 2012 Summer Olympics opening ceremony in London.

The band played two shows in France in November 2016 to celebrate 15 years of Talitres Records.

They released their second album, The Machine That Made Us, on 16 June 2017.

== Musical style ==
Their sound has been described as a cross between space rock and chamber pop, with perceived musical similarities to bands such as Mercury Rev, The Flaming Lips, Grandaddy, Sparklehorse, The Unicorns, and Air.

== Members ==
- Paul Carter (2001 – present) – Vocals, Domingotron
- Ben Clay (2001 – present) – Guitars & Bass
- Colin Coxall (2001–2005) – Drums, Octopad
- Nainesh Shah (2001 – present) – Guitars, Slides, & Vocals (also Keyboards live).
- Vicky West (2001 – present) – Keyboards, Samples, Vocals, Buttons & Dials
- Steve Swindon (2008 – present) – Drums on newly recorded material for second album and live.

The following people have also played in Flotation Toy Warning –

- Elizabeth Ansty (2005–2011) – Keyboards, backing vocals and guitars live.
- Rhys Llewellyn (2005) – Drums for live appearance at Vienna Bluebird Songwriters Festival 2005. (Rhys also played drums on 'Fire Engine On Fire Part 1').
- Barry Carter (father of Paul Carter) appeared for one gig only on backing vocals for 'Best Boy Electric'.
- Adrian Smith (2011–present) – Additional bass guitar, vocals and keyboards live.
- Gwen Cheeseman (2016–?) Keyboards, backing vocals and additional guitars live.

Colin Coxall left Flotation Toy Warning in 2005 to live in Japan. He was replaced by Steve Swindon, who previously engineered and recorded both EPs and the first album by Flotation Toy Warning.

== Discography ==
=== Albums ===
- Bluffer's Guide to the Flight Deck (2004)
- The Machine That Made Us (2017)

=== Singles & EPs ===
- I Remember Trees CD EP (2002)
- The Special Tape CD EP (2002)
- "When the Boat Comes inside Your House/A Season Underground" 7-inch vinyl (25 April 2011)
- a different version of 'Even Fantastica' appeared on an Earworm compilation entitled 'Where the Sea Meets the Sky'
- Flotation Toy Warning contributed 'The Buoys Are Back in Town' to the 2012 alternative Olympic soundtrack album It's the Taking Part That Counts on Wiaiwya records.
- King of Foxgloves limited edition 7" vinyl single June 2017. Included with initial purchases of The Machine That Made Us vinyl LP.
- I Remember Trees 10 inch Vinyl EP (2023)
- The Special Tape 10 inch Vinyl EP (2023)
