= Blue Hours =

2022 studio album by Bear's Den

- Standard edition

Studio album by Bears Den
- Released: 13 May 2022
- Genre: Folk rock, alternative rock
- Length: 43:14
- Label: Communion
- Producer: Ian Grimble

Bears Den chronology
Fragments (2020)	Blue Hours (2022)

Singles from Blue Hours
- 1. "All That You Are" Released: 17 November 2021; 2. "Spiders" Released: 19 January 2022; 3. "Shadows" Released: 16 February 2022; 4. "Blue Hours" Released: 29 March 2022; 5. "Frightened Whispers" Released: 20 April 2022

Blue Hours is the fifth studio album by British folk rock band Bear's Den. It was released on 13 May 2022 by Communion in the United Kingdom and internationally. The album was written by the band and produced by Ian Grimble. It marked the band's first record of new material since So That You Might Hear Me in 2019 and follows the collaboration album with Paul Frith, Fragments. The album debuted on the UK Albums Chart at number 6, making it the band's joint highest-charting album domestically.

== Recording ==
The album builds on the themes of the bands previous releases, with greater emphasis on self-reflection and mental health after both band members struggled particularly with the latter in the years leading up to the albums' recording. It also marked a move towards a sound containing more electronic experimentation whilst still retaining acoustic and piano use throughout.

== Critical reception ==
The album was released to mainly positive reviews with many focusing on the personal and intimate nature of the album's lyrics.

Writing in her review for Pitchfork, Hannah Jocelyn spoke of how the Blue Hours' production was contrasting to its themes, stating, "every song sounds clean and punchy, but the refined atmosphere is at odds with the band's newfound comfort with messiness." In her 6 out of 10 review for Gigwise, Leeza Isaeva also concentrated on the emotional focus of the songs throughout. In praising Davie's lyrics which "excel with some moments of emotional complexity" there was criticism of the limited development of the bands' sound as they "continue to combine their banjo sound with limited electronic experimentation." Adam Boustred, writing for Renowned for Sound also scored the album 6 out of 10 but praised the production, commenting it "underlines the album's character in its timbre".

== Commercial performance ==
Blue Hours debuted at number 6 in the UK, making it the band's joint highest position on the chart alongside their second album, Red Earth & Pouring Rain. The album also charted in the Netherlands and Belgium.

== Track listing ==
All tracks written by Bear's Den (Andrew Davie and Kevin Jones) and produced by Ian Grimble.

Blue Hours track listing
No.	Title	Length
1.	"New Ways"	3:51
2.	"Blue Hours"	3:54
3.	"Frightened Whispers"	4:01
4.	"Gratitude"	4:25
5.	"Shadows"	5:04
6.	"All That You Are"	4:11
7.	"Spiders"	3:49
8.	"Selective Memories"	3:59
9.	"On Your Side"	4:57
10.	"All the Wrong Places"	5:05
Total length:		43:14

== Charts ==
Chart performance for Blue Hours
Chart (2022)	Peak position
Belgian Albums (Ultratop Flanders)	21
Dutch Albums (Album Top 100)	20
Scottish Albums (OCC)	4
UK Albums (OCC)	6
