= Bear's Den (band) =

English rock duo

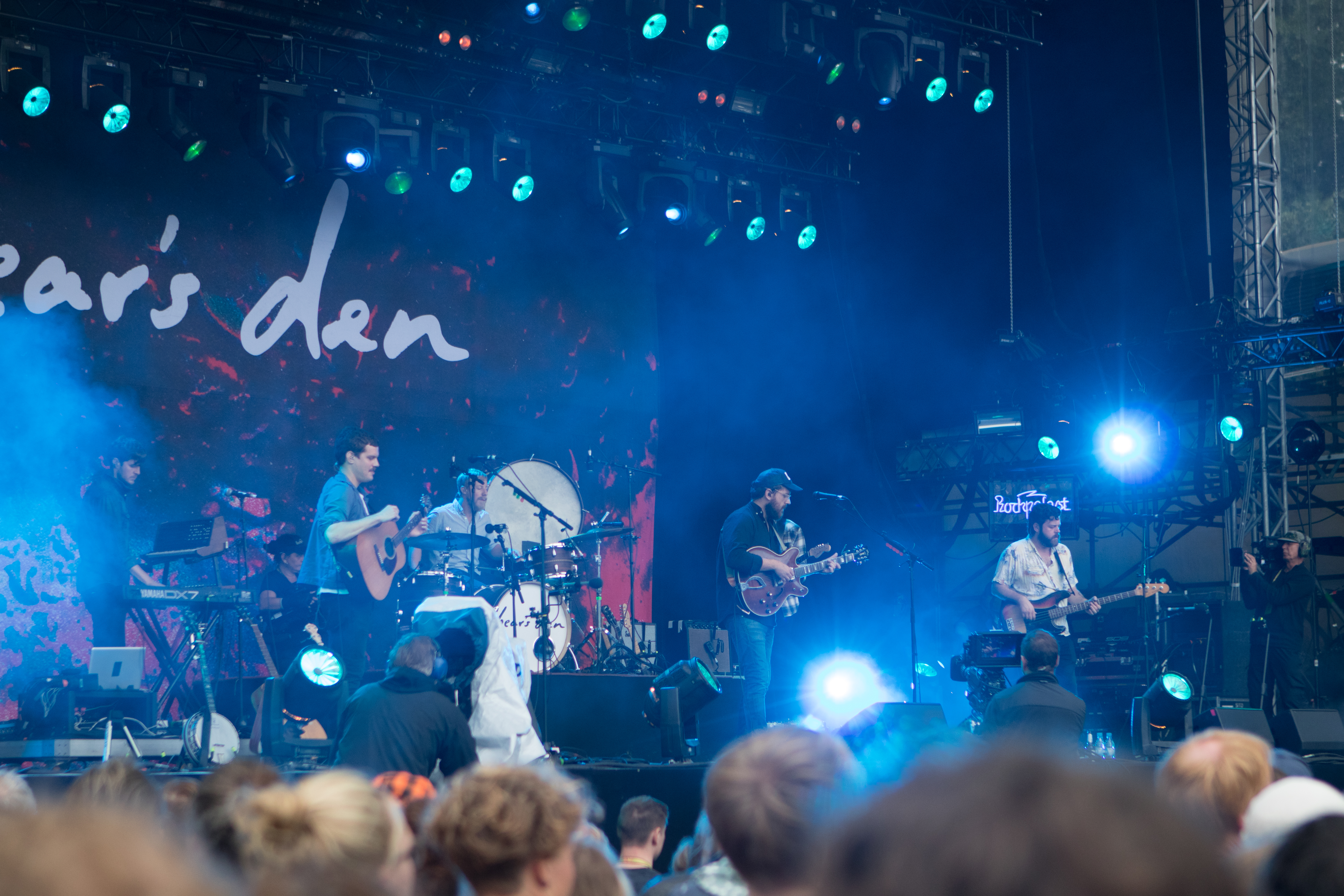
- Bear's Den performing in 2017

Background information
- Origin: London, England
- Genres: Alternative country; indie folk
- Years active: 2009–present
- Labels: Communion; Caroline International; Dew Process
- Members: Andrew Davie; (see touring members)
- Past members: Joey Haynes; Kevin Jones
- Website: bearsdenmusic.co.uk

Bear's Den are a British alternative country and indie folk band from London, formed in 2009 by multi-instrumentalist Kevin Jones and vocalist/guitarist Andrew Davie. In 2025, Jones departed the band, leaving Davie as the sole remaining permanent member.

They have released five studio albums: Islands (2014), Red Earth & Pouring Rain (2016), So That You Might Hear Me (2019), Fragments (2020), and Blue Hours (2022). They have also produced one soundtrack album and issued nine EPs as well as numerous singles.

Bear's Den have been nominated for several music awards throughout their career, with "Above the Clouds of Pompeii" earning them a nomination for the Ivor Novello Award for Best Song Musically and Lyrically, in 2015. They received two nominations at the UK Americana Awards in 2016, as Artist of the Year and Song of the Year, for "Agape".

== History ==
=== 2009–2014: Early years and touring ===
Bear's Den was formed in 2009 by multi-instrumentalist Kevin Jones and vocalist/guitarist Andrew Davie, who had both previously played in the band Cherbourg. They named themselves after Bearsden, a neighbouring town to where Davie's grandparents lived and where he first began writing songs. They soon added Joey Haynes, who played guitar and banjo.

The band's first tour involved them travelling across the United States in Volkswagen campervans with Ben Howard, Nathaniel Rateliff, and the Staves. It was made into a 2014 documentary titled Austin to Boston by James Marcus Haney, which premiered at the 58th BFI London Film Festival.

Since then, the band has toured the US several times, in support of Mumford & Sons and Daughter and as headliners. They also toured the UK supporting Smoke Fairies in 2012 and Australia with Matt Corby in October 2013.

In June 2014, Bear's Den received the £2,500 Momentum Deezer Award from the PRS for Music Foundation.

=== 2014–2016: Islands ===
On 20 October 2014, Bear's Den released their debut album, Islands, on Communion Records, a label founded in 2006 by Kevin Jones, with Ben Lovett of Mumford & Sons and producer Ian Grimble.

The album spent ten weeks on the UK Official Charts, peaking at #49. Islands appeared at #7 in the first official UK Americana Chart and at #9 in the top-selling Americana albums of 2015.

In March 2015, the song "Above the Clouds of Pompeii" was nominated for the Ivor Novello award for Best Song Musically and Lyrically.

In October, Islands was re-released as a deluxe edition featuring an extra CD of live tracks.

That year, the band sold out their extensive UK, Europe, and US tours. They performed at international festivals such as Reading and Leeds, Glastonbury, Lollapalooza, Citadel, Somersault, NOS Alive, BBK, Squamish, Pukkelpop, Lowlands, Bonnaroo, and Dockville.

On 4 February 2016, Joey Haynes announced via the band's Facebook page that he was leaving the group to spend more time with family and friends.

On 14 October 2016, just under two years since its release, Islands was certified Silver by the British Phonographic Industry, in recognition of 60,000 sales. It was certified Gold in 2023.

=== 2016–2019: Red Earth & Pouring Rain ===
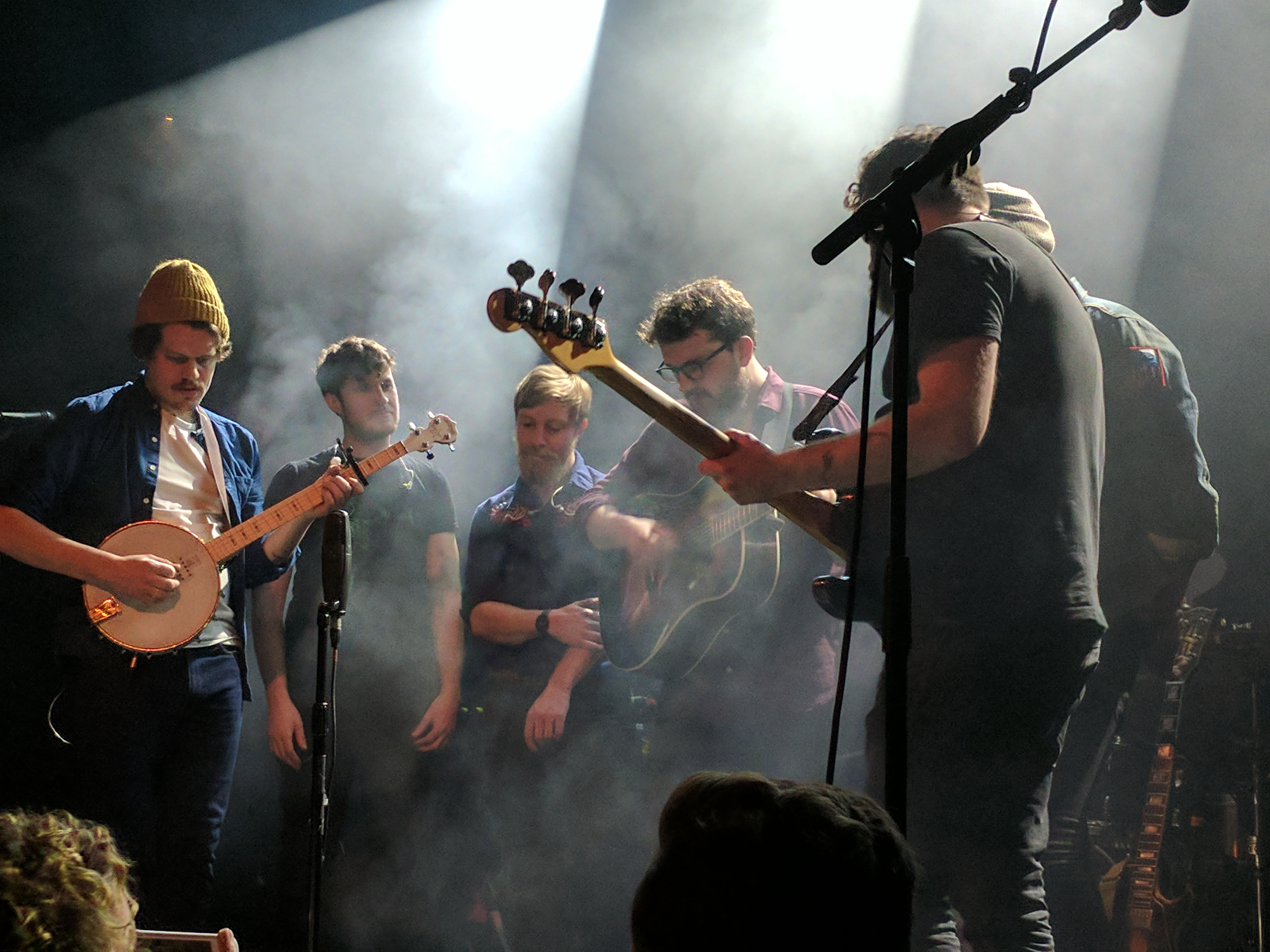
Bear's Den performing at the Bowery Ballroom in New York City, 2017

On 4 April 2016, the band released a trailer in anticipation of their second album, Red Earth & Pouring Rain, which came out on 22 July. They also announced a tour of Europe for Autumn 2016, including their biggest headline show to date, at Brixton Academy.

=== 2019–2020: So That You Might Hear Me ===
In January 2019, Bear's Den changed their social media design after almost three years, and a website was sent to people affiliated to their official page, called "So That You Might Hear Me", the title of their next album. Four days later, it was revealed that the record would be released on 26 April 2019. They also released two singles the next day: "Blankets of Sorrow" and "Fuel on the Fire". On 4 March, they issued a third single, "Laurel Wreath". On 12 February 2019, a podcast bearing the album's name was announced. Hosted by Danny Carissimi, each episode explored one song on the album through interviews with Davie and Jones.

In 2019, the band supported Neil Young on several stadium shows in Germany and in August, they began their Highlands and Islands tour of Scotland, a stripped-back acoustic affair, and they were joined onstage by Christof van der Ven and Marcus Hamblett.

=== 2020–2023: Fragments, Blue Hours, Trying, White Magnolias, and First Loves ===
On 26 June 2020, Bear's Den posted a snippet of a new version of their 2019 track "Fuel on the Fire" and followed it with alternate versions of "Napoleon" and "When You Break" over the next several days. On 1 July, they announced a studio recording of the shows they had done with Paul Frith in 2018, consisting of orchestral reinterpretations of the band's music, titled Fragments. It was released in September.

On 17 November 2021, "All That You Are", the first single from the band's fourth studio album, Blue Hours, came out. This was followed by "Spiders", on 19 January 2022. They announced that Blue Hours would be released on 13 May 2022 and accompanied by a European and North American tour, their first since 2020.

In July 2022, Bear's Den released an album of tracks they had recorded for the third season of the TV show Trying, which included collaboration with Maisie Peters, Jade Bird, and Monica Martin. In 2023, the band released the EPs First Loves and White Magnolias. In 2024, they issued a new version of their 2014 song "Above the Clouds of Pompeii", featuring Dermot Kennedy.

=== 2025–present: Kevin Jones departure ===
In 2025, Kevin Jones announced on the band's Facebook and Instagram pages that he was departing the band, without providing a reason. The band then went on to perform at the Glastonbury Festival, headline the Folk by the Oak Festival, and announce an upcoming Australian tour.

Also in 2025, Bear's Den toured the UK and Europe to celebrate the ten-year anniversary of their debut album, Islands.

== Live band ==
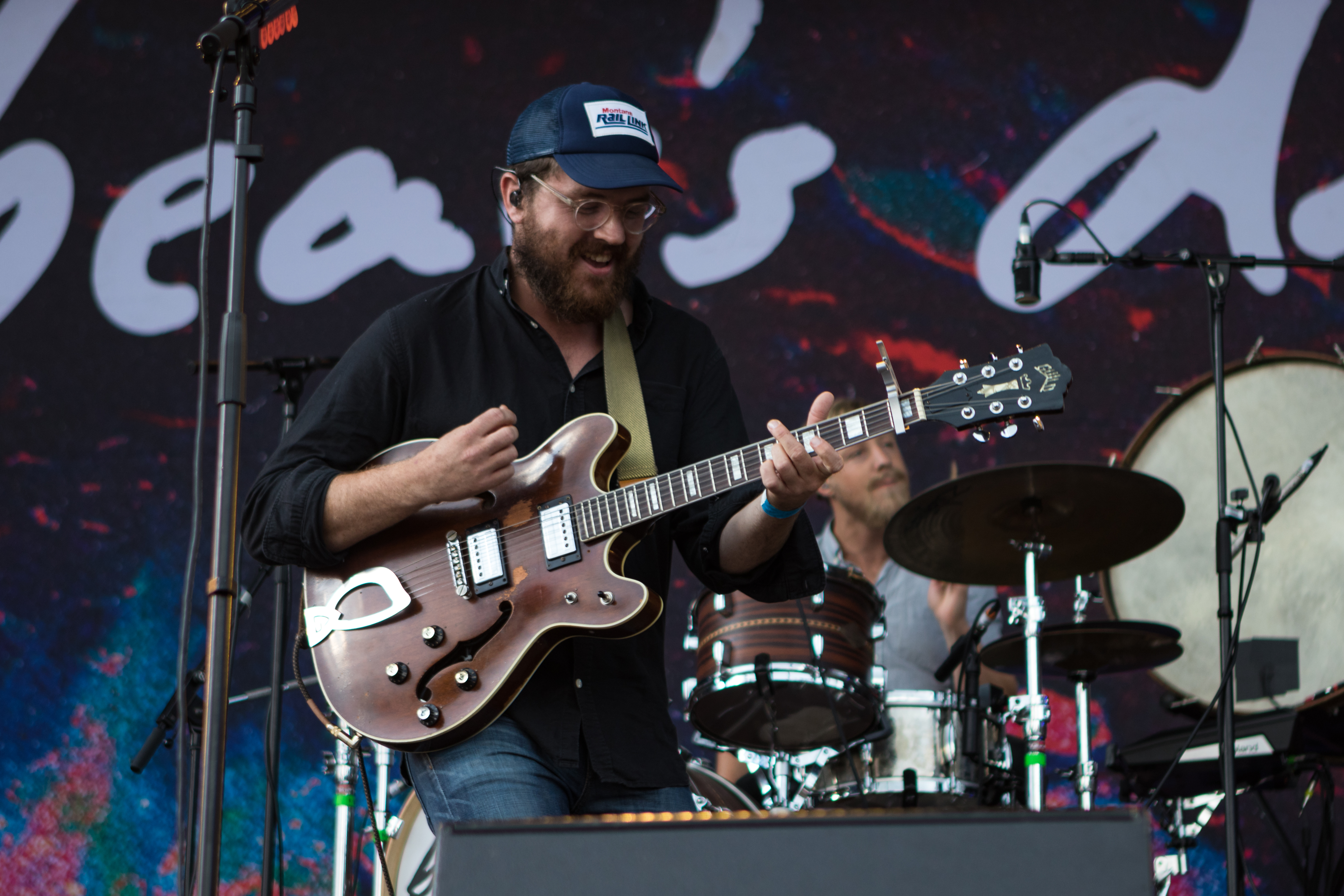
Andrew Davie in 2017

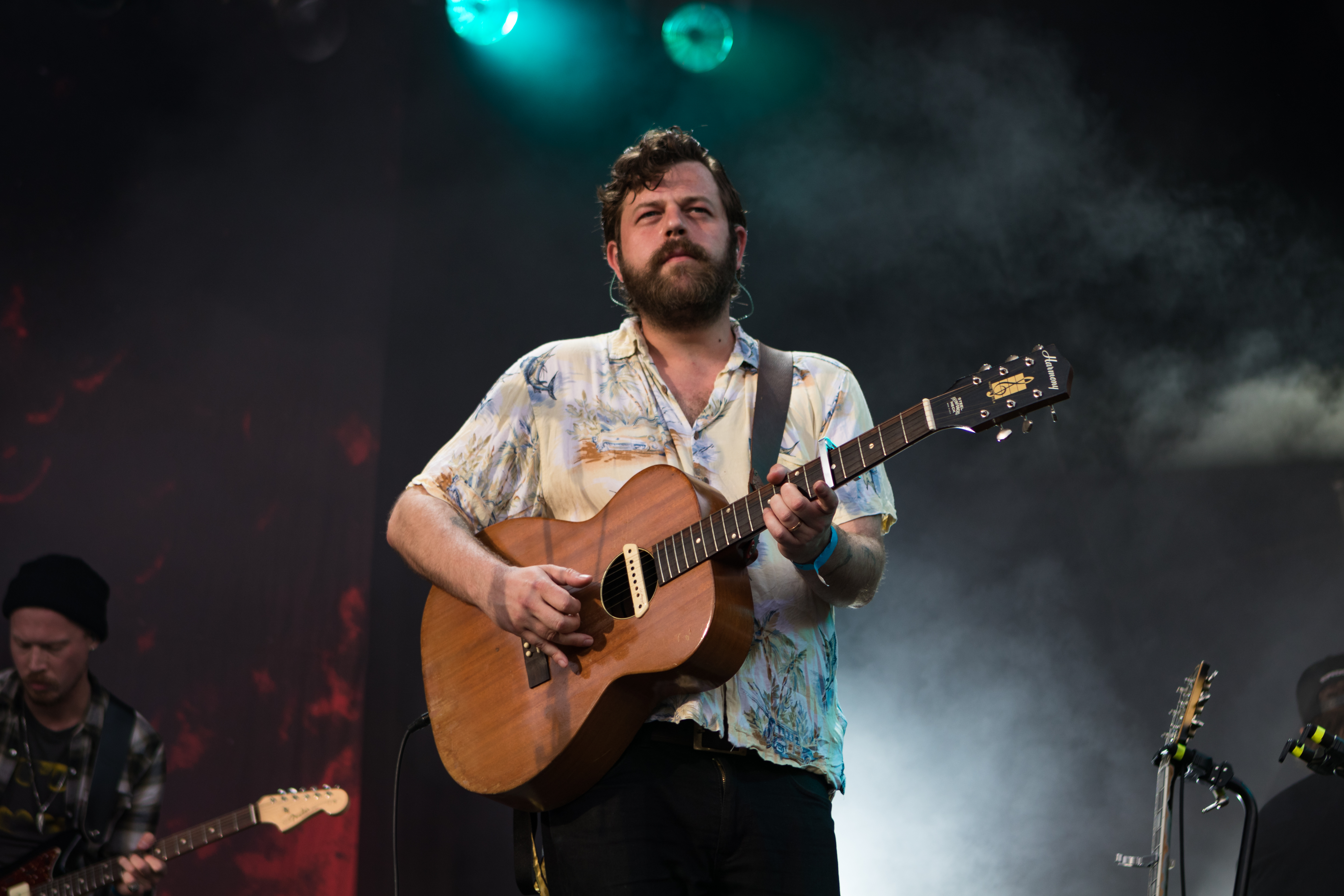
Kevin Jones in 2017

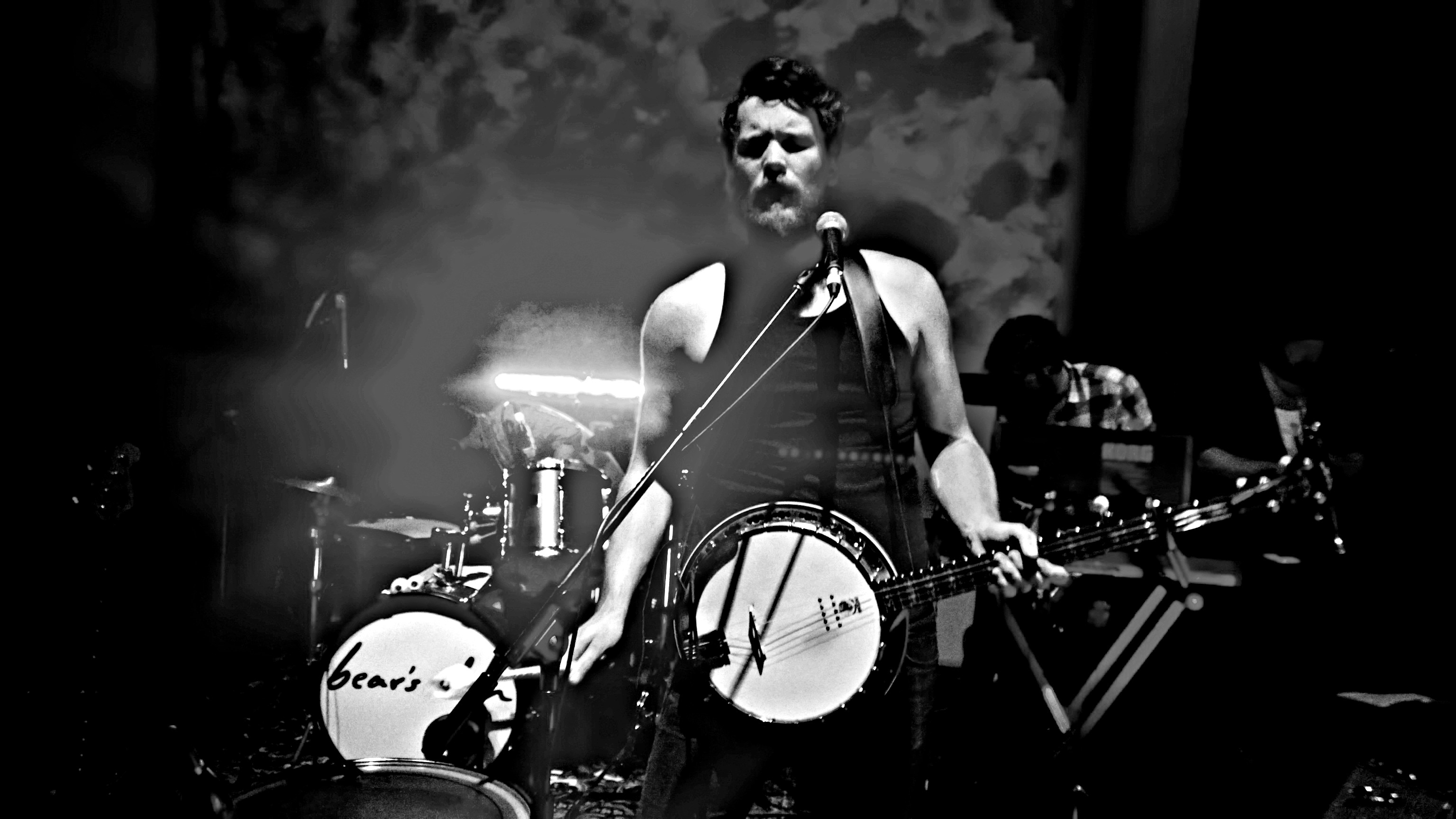
Joey Haynes in 2014

Bear's Den's touring members include Christof van der Ven (banjo, acoustic guitar, bass, backing vocals), Marcus Hamblett (guitars, backing vocals, horns, synths), Jools Owen (horns, drums, backing vocals), and Harry Mundy (electric guitar).

== Band members ==
Current

- Andrew Davie – lead vocals, guitars (2011–present)

Past

- Kevin Jones – vocals, drums, bass, guitar (2011–2025)
- Joey Haynes – vocals, banjo, guitar (2011–2016)

Touring

- Marcus Hamblett – guitars, vocals, horns, synths (2014–present)
- Jools Owen – horns, drums, vocals (2015–present)
- Christof van der Ven – banjo, acoustic guitar, bass guitar, vocals (2016–present)
- Harry Mundy – electric guitar (2016–present)

== Discography ==
=== Studio albums ===
Title	Details	Peak chart positions						Certification
Title	Details	UK	BEL (Fl)	GER	IRE	NLD	SWI	Certification
Islands	Released: 20 October 2014; Label: Communion; Formats: Digital download, CD, vinyl	49	16	—	—	29	—	BPI: Gold
Red Earth & Pouring Rain	Released: 22 July 2016; Label: Communion; Formats: Digital download, CD, vinyl	6	9	26	61	5	53	
So That You Might Hear Me	Released: 26 April 2019; Label: Communion; Formats: Digital download, CD, vinyl	13	4	40	—	7	63	
Blue Hours	Released: 13 May 2022; Label: Communion; Formats: Digital download, CD, vinyl, cassette	6	21	—	—	20	—	

=== EPs ===
- EP (2012)
- Agape (2013)
- Without/Within (2013)
- Elysium (2014)
- Only Son of the Falling Snow (2019)
- Christmas, Hopefully (2020)
- The Quiet Winter Light (2022)
- First Loves (2023)
- White Magnolias (2023)

=== Other albums ===
- Fragments (with Paul Frith) (2020)
- Trying: Season 3 (Apple TV Original Series Soundtrack) (2022)

=== Singles ===
- "Agape" (2013)
- "Writing on the Wall" (2013)
- "Above the Clouds of Pompeii" (2014)
- "Elysium" (2014)
- "Think of England" (2015)
- "Auld Wives" (2016)
- "Emeralds" (2016)
- "Dew on the Vine" (2016)
- "Berlin" (2016)
- "Fuel on the Fire" (2019)
- "Blankets of Sorrow" (2019)
- "Laurel Wreath" (2019)
- "Crow" (2019)
- "Only Son of the Falling Snow" (2019)
- "Christmas, Hopefully" (2020)
- "All That You Are" (2021)
- "Spiders" (2022)
- "Blue Hours" (2022)
- "A Good Love, Pt. 2" (2022)
- "Please Don't Hide Yourself Away" (2022)
- "Team" (2022)
- "Stitch in Time" (2022)
- "Honest Mistake" (2022)
- "Evelyn" (2023)
- "Above the Clouds of Pompeii (feat. Dermot Kennedy)" (2024)
- "Promiser" with Ciaran Lavery (2025)
