= The Horse EP =

The Horse

EP by Alessi's Ark
- Released: 7 December 2008
- Genre: Folk, pop
- Label: Virgin
- Producer: Mike Mogis

Alessi's Ark chronology
Bedroom Bound EP (2007)	The Horse (2008)	Friend Ships EP (2009)

The Horse EP is an EP by British singer-songwriter Alessi's Ark. It was her first release for Virgin and featured re-recorded versions of two songs from her debut release, the Bedroom Bound EP, "The Horse" and "Let's Race" and two new tracks, "Neighbour's Birds" and "Patchwork Of Dreams". Jake Bellows of Neva Dinova provides guest vocals on lead track "The Horse".

== Track listing ==
All songs written by Alessi Laurent-Marke

1. "The Horse (Radio Mix)" – 1:53
2. "Neighbour's Birds" – 3:36
3. "Let's Race" – 3:18
4. "Patchwork Of Dreams" – 3:29
