= R. Missing =

American electronic musicians

- Origin: New York City, New York
- Genres: Dark wave, Post-punk, synthpop
- Years active: 2017–present
- Labels: Talitres, Terminal Echo, Italians Do It Better, Sugarcane Recordings
- Members: Sharon Shy; Henry Frost
- Website: https://rmissing.bandcamp.com

R. Missing is an American electronic music duo composed of Sharon Shy and Henry Frost from New York, New York formed in 2017. Their work incorporates the genres of indie electronic, darkwave and new wave/post-punk revival.

== Career ==
R. Missing's first release was in 2017 through French indie label Talitres. Jean-Daniel Beauvallet of Les Inrockuptibles described their sound as "pop noire." The album received BBC Radio airplay from Steve Lamacq. R. Missing toured with labelmates Motorama (band) in support of the album in 2019, performing at venues such as Le Botanique, Petit Bain and Stereolux.

They have collaborated with or have been remixed by many artists including Digitalism (band), Moss of Aura, Croatian Amor, Surgeon (musician), The Field (musician), Sally Shapiro, Johan Agebjörn, The KVB and GusGus. In 2023, R. Missing collaborated with Causeway on Wear the Night Out released on the Italians Do It Better label. Shy and Frost are listed as cowriters on the Tricky (rapper) song Does It.

In 2020, R. Missing released their independent EP Placeholder for the Night. The premiere was hosted by The Big Takeover. Shy cryptically stated, "Each little hour is photometry, and it's all so fast. Sometimes sad. In the end, it's just a placeholder for the night."

In January 2022, Sugarcane Recordings released Placelessness and Saturnining.

In October 2024, they were part of Cleopatra Records' We Wish You a Merry Gothmas compilation alongside artists including Xiu Xiu, Lebanon Hanover and David J of Bauhaus (band).

In December 2024 they released Knife Shook Your Hand. Gorilla vs. Bear attempted to document the "mysterious" group and included them on their SiriusXM radio show and songs of 2024 playlist.

In December 2025, R. Missing released a full-length album called Like the Sound of Injured Love. It was selected for the KEXP Staff, Volunteers, and Interns Top Albums of 2025.

In February 2026, R. Missing was played on NTS Radio. In May 2026, the duo released an album titled Turning Off Lights Is My Destiny under the Terminal Echo label.

== Discography ==
=== Albums ===
- Knife Shook Your Hand (2024)
- Like the Sound of Injured Love (2025)
- Turning Off Lights Is My Destiny (2026)

=== EPs ===
- Unsummering (2017)
- Placeholder for the Night (2020)
- Placelessness and Saturnining (2022)
