= Fear of Men =

British band

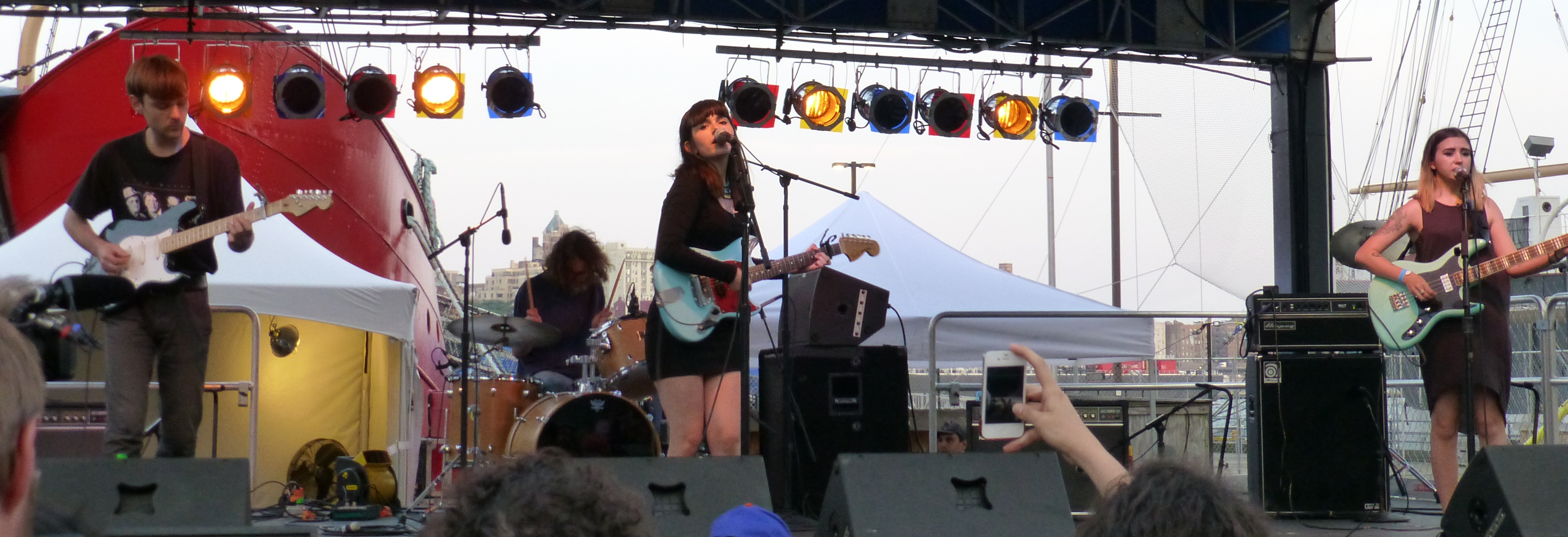

Background information
- Origin: Brighton, England
- Genres: Dream pop, Indie pop
- Years active: 2011–present
- Label: Kanine Records
- Members: Jess Weiss; Daniel Falvey; Michael Miles
- Past members: Lin Agnholt; Alex Fynn O'Neill; Becky Wilkie; Robyn Edwards
- Website: www.fearofmen.co.uk

Fear of Men is a Brighton-based band that formed in early 2011 and consists of Jess Weiss (vocals/guitar), Daniel Falvey (guitars/keyboards) and Michael Miles (drums). On 12 February 2013 the band released a reverse chronological compilation of their early singles through Kanine Records called Early Fragments. The band released their debut album Loom in April 2014 through Kanine Records. A limited edition Record Store Day Vinyl was released on 19 April 2014. In 2016 they released their second album Fall Forever.

== History ==
Fear of Men was formed in early 2011 by Jessica Weiss and Daniel Falvey. For her art degree, Weiss had been creating soundtracks for her short films and she met Falvey at one of the exhibitions for her films. Falvey, a guitarist and a fellow art student, liked her recordings and they started working together. Weiss became the lead vocalist and lyricist, while Lin Agnholt and Anthony joined on bass and drums respectively.

In March 2011, they released a four-track cassette entitled the "Hannah Schygulla Demos" on the Sex is Disgusting label and began to perform live locally. In August the band released the single "Ritual Confession" on the Italian Beach Babes label. It was followed in December of that year by the "Alice Munro Demos" . Lin was replaced by Alex Fynn O'Neill on bass, with Michael Miles (ex Laish) drums. This created the core of Weiss, Falvey and Miles as a trio that recorded together while bass was added to the live-setting. In June 2012 they release the single "Green Sea" on the Sexbeat label. It was followed by the 7" "Mosaic" October on Too Pure.

In February 2013, Kanine Records released a compilation of previous recordings as Early Fragments. It included the previous three singles and one previously unreleased track "Sheer". The album was described as "moving backwards from their most recent dreamy haze to their first art school experiments" by Consequence of Sound. The band also performed at SXSW, Festival Nrmal and the Indietracks festivals, with Alex replaced by Robyn Edwards on bass.

They worked on their debut LP Loom, which was released in May 2014. In a review on Pitchfork described it as "wistful dream pop" while it received an aggregated score of 83 on Metacritic. They toured North America and Europe supporting The Pains of Being Pure At Heart.

After the release of Loom, Weiss began composing new songs while experimenting with electronic sounds. The new material was played live during a short tour supporting Lower Dens in October 2015. This experience changed some of the material as the band "wanted to write an album that would make the stage shake, and we had to work out how we could sound stronger and get our ideas across in a more concise way". By the end of December 2015 the recording had been completed.

== Style ==
In relation to recording the second album, Falvey commented that "We got a lot more interested in manipulating sounds and building songs with computers, but we had to learn how to combine that with our live performance".

== Discography ==
=== Albums ===
- Loom - (2014)
- Fall Forever - (2016)

=== Singles ===
- "Ritual Confession" - Italian Beach Babes, 2011
- "Mosaic" - Too Pure, 2012
- "Green Sea" - Sexbeat, 2012
- "Luna" - Art Is Hard Records, 2014
- "Island" - Kanine Records, 2016
- "Into Strangeness" - Apertura, 2020

=== Compilations ===
- Early Fragments (2013)
