= Rachael Dadd =

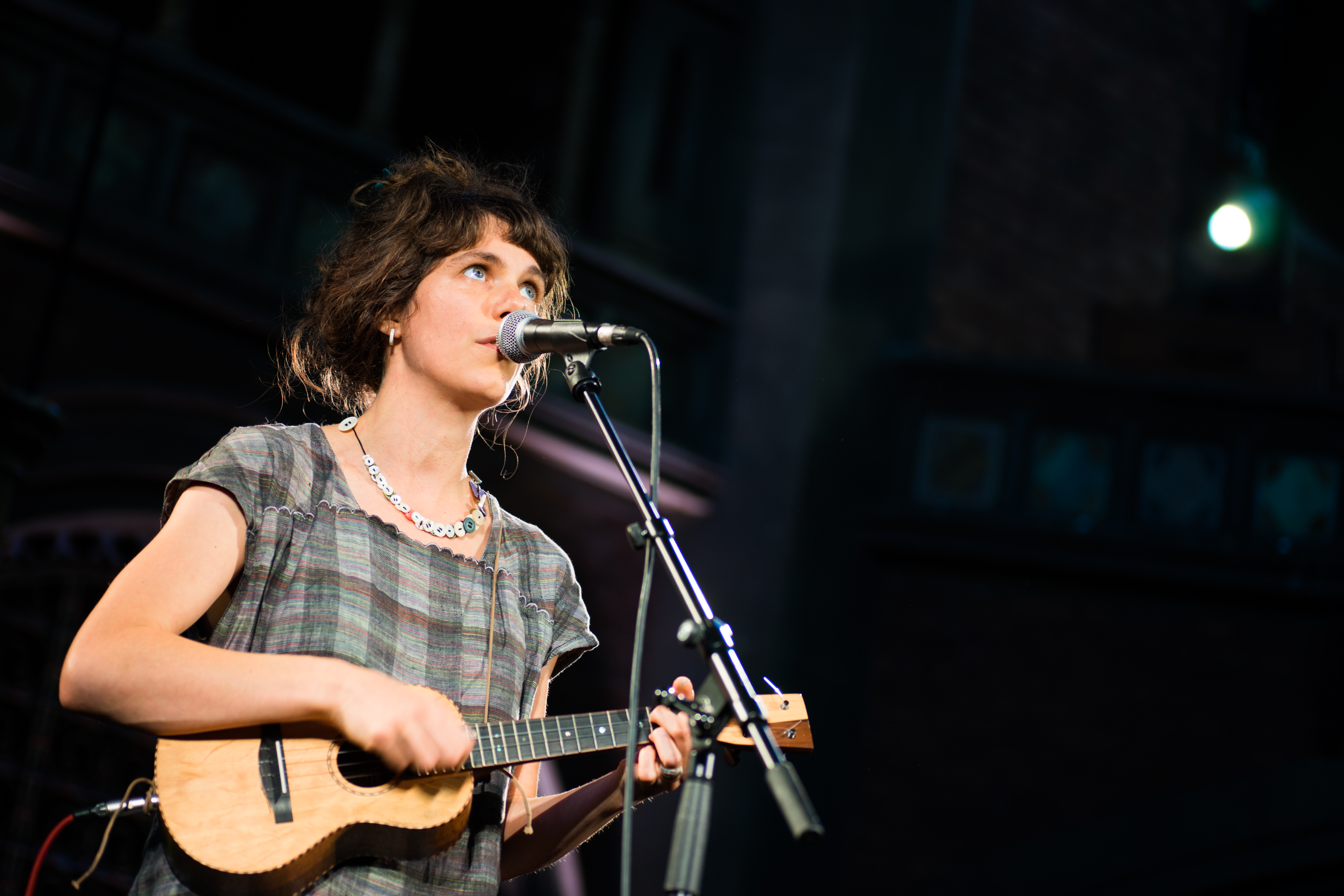

Background information
- Genres: Folk
- Occupation: Musician
- Years active: 2004-Present
- Labels: Memphis Industries

Rachael Dadd is an English folk and lo-fi musician based in Bristol, England. She is currently signed to French independent label Talitres.

Dadd has played at a variety of UK music festivals including Glastonbury, End of the Road, Green Man and Truck. She has also toured with Alessi's Ark, Francois and the Atlas Mountains, This Is The Kit and Rozi Plain.

== Music career ==
Dadd has played alongside a wide range of notable UK bands and artists including Laura Marling, Sons of Noel and Adrian, and Curly Hair. In February 2009 and again in July 2009, she toured the UK with Alessi's Ark. In recent years, she has played at Glastonbury Festival every year.

She regularly collaborates with This Is the Kit frontwoman Kate Stables, with whom she performed in the band Whalebone Polly. Additionally she performs alongside Wig Smith as The Hand and with Rozi Plain. She also performs with her husband, Japanese musician ad performance artist ICHI. Multi-instrumentalist Emma Gatrill often performs as a member of Dadd's band. The two announced an eight date tour of Japan for April 2018.

Dadd has received ongoing support from BBC Bristol and has also been played on Gideon Coe's show on BBC 6 Music.

Her 2014 album We Resonate was released through French independent record label Talitres.

Dadd provided backing vocals on Jinnwoo's 2016 release, Strangers Bring Me No Light.

== Discography ==
- Summer/Autumn Recordings (2004)
- Songs from the Crypt (2005)
- The World Outside is in a Cupboard (2007)
- After The Ant Fight (2008)
- Moth In The Motor (piano mini-album10") (2010)
- Elephee EP (2010)
- Bite the Mountain (2011)
- We Resonate (2014)
- Connected to the Rock/Archipelago (2018)
- FLUX (2019)
- Live from The Planetarium in Ehime, Japan (2020)
- Live from the Ramsgate Music Hall (2020)
- Kaleidoscope (2022)

== As artist ==
Dadd graduated from art school with first class honours. She is still a practising and exhibiting artist, making her own limited edition record sleeves and collaborating with her sister, Betsy Dadd, who is an animator and an RCA graduate.
