= Soul Proprietor =

EP by Alessi's Ark
- Released: 5 April 2010
- Genre: Folk, pop
- Label: Bella Union

Alessi's Ark chronology
Live Session (2009)	Soul Proprietor (2010)	Time Travel (2011)

Soul Proprietor is an EP by British singer-songwriter Alessi Laurent-Marke. It is her first on new record label Bella Union and marks her move from major label Virgin to an independent. It coincides with her most high-profile tour as special guest to acclaimed British folk artist Laura Marling at her UK shows in April 2010. Prior to its release music website Drowned in Sound offered a free download of one song from the EP, "Shovelling", as a preview. Photographer Rebecca Miller took the cover shot at the How We Lived Then museum in Eastbourne.

== Track listing ==
All songs written by Alessi Laurent-Marke

1. "The Robot"
2. "Shovelling"
3. "Dancing Feet"
4. "The Bird Song"
