= Ralfe Band =

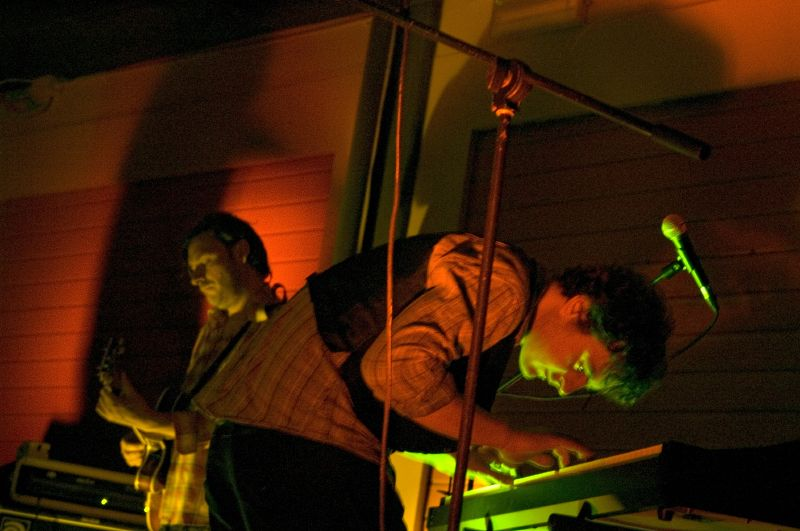
- Ralfe Band in 2007

Background information
- Origin: Oxford, England
- Labels: Highline Records, Loose Music, Talitres, Skint Records, Ghost Ship Records
- Website: www.ralfeband.com

Ralfe Band is the work of English songwriter Oly Ralfe.

The debut album Swords was released in UK in 2005 by Skint Records and elsewhere in Europe in 2007 by Talitres, with Mojo awarding a 4-star review, calling it "a whiskey-soured folk trip from east to west.. .Ralfe's moon-eyed beauty is simply the work of one vivid imagination". The second album Attic Thieves was released in 2008 by Loose and Talitres Records, and their third, Son Be Wise was released by Highline Records in 2013. The Quietus remarked about Attic Thieves, "Like Swords before it, their sophomore offering gives us more delightfully lo-fi sketches, pretty in a slightly wonky, slightly wrong way, like Rosanna Arquette in Crash."

Following this Ralfe Band created the soundtrack for the feature film, Bunny and the Bull. The soundtrack album was released in 2010. The album was well received and scored an 8/10 NME review, "The 22 tracks here recall the deft melancholy of the Amelie soundtrack... The kind of regally drunk spirit last heard on David Dundas' equally fine Withnail & I soundtrack. Score!"

The band have toured across Europe and have performed on main stages at the Glastonbury Festival, Reading and Leeds, CMJ New York, SWSW Austin as well as at festivals in Ireland, Italy and Turkey.

The band also appeared in The Mighty Boosh television series in the episode "The Legend of Old Gregg" where they played musicians in a pub.

Oly Ralfe is a visual artist and filmmaker. He created the imagery for Ralfe Band’s records and also the animated video ‘Women Of Japan’ which won Best Music Video at SXSW. Another award followed for Oly Ralfe’s film ‘The Ballad of AJ Weberman’, a feature documentary about the notorious Bob Dylan obsessive and pioneer of ‘garbology’. The film won the Raindance Award at the British Independent Film Awards and was screened on BBC 4 on Dylan’s 70th birthday. Ralfe also collaborated with Julian Barratt and Noel Fielding, contributing songs and cameos to The Mighty Boosh TV shows and poems for the Boosh book. In 2010, Ralfe directed the film The Mighty Boosh On Tour - Journey of the Childmen.

== Discography ==
=== Studio albums ===
- Swords (October 2005)
- Attic Thieves (October 2008)
- Son Be Wise (May 2013)
- Achilles Was a Hound Dog (June 2023)

=== Soundtracks ===
- Bunny and the Bull - Original Soundtrack (January 2010)

=== Singles and EPs ===
- Albatross Waltz (2005) 7", download
- Fifteen Hundred Years (2005) 7", download
- Women of Japan (2006) CD, 7", download
- Attics / Stumble (2008) 7", download
- Come On Go Wild (2013), 7" (purple vinyl), digital
- Barricades (2013), digital
- Cold Chicago Morning / Oh My Father Field Music remix (2014), download. Limited edition Cold Chicago Morning linocut for Record Store Day 2014, handmade and hand-printed by Oly Ralfe, with download code for both tracks, limited to 250 copies, signed and numbered.
- Sweating It Out (2019), digital
