= Laish (band) =

English alternative folk band

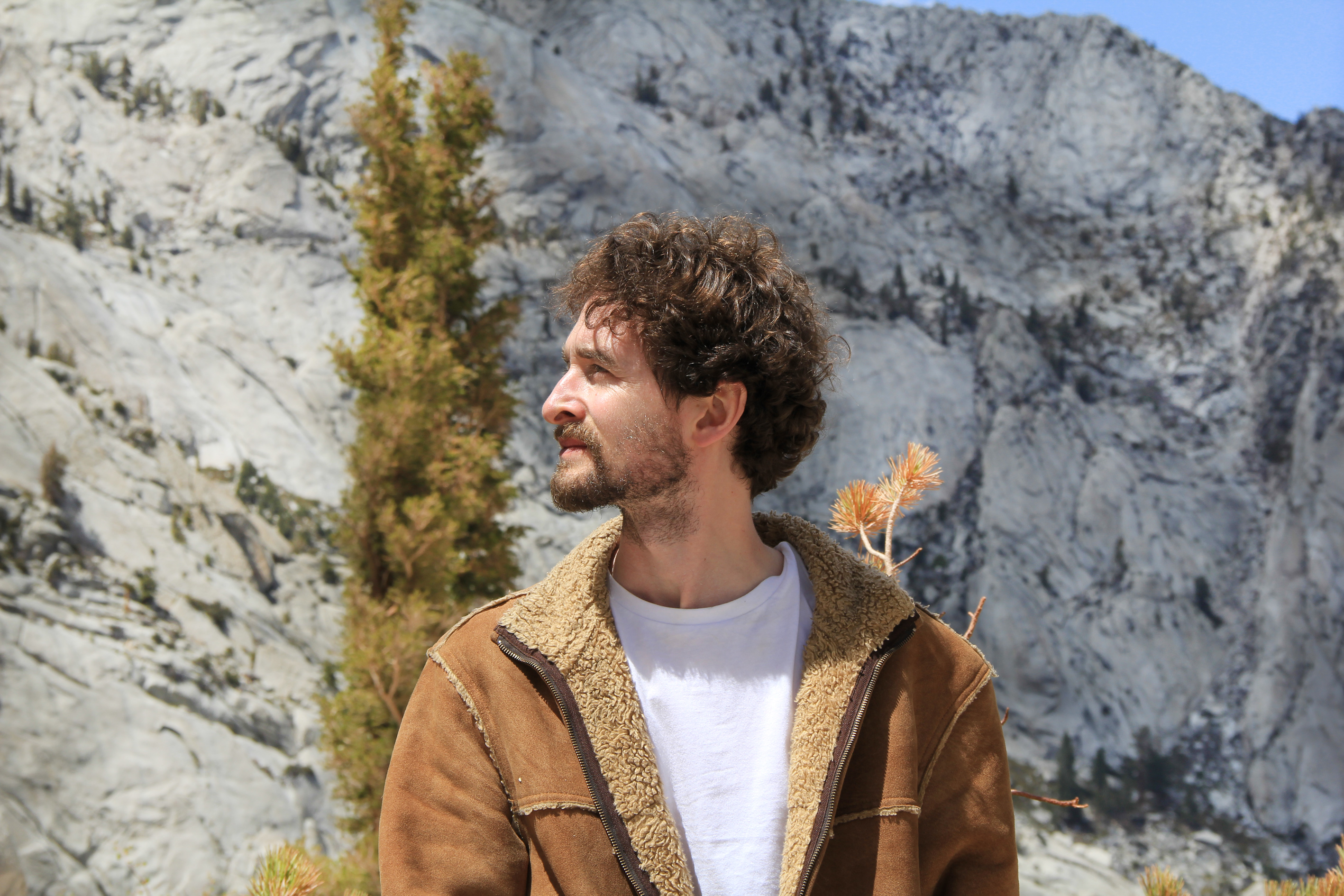
- Danny Green of Laish

Background information
- Origin: Brighton, London
- Genres: Folk rock, indie rock, alternative rock
- Labels: Talitres, Willkommen Records, Folkwit
- Members: Danny Green, Tom Chadd, Felix Weldon, Matt Canty, Mike Siddell
- Past members: Jools Owen, Rob Pemberton, Riccardo Castellani, Ollie Tunmer, Emma Gatrill, Martha Rose, Dan Harding, Cathy Cardin, Jen Rouse, Ben Gregory, Mike Miles, Jo Burke, Jessica Weiss, Talitha Gamaroff, Sara Mae Tuson, Jane Dodson.
- Website: laishmusic.com

Laish (/laɪʃ/) is a British folk rock band led by songwriter, guitarist and singer Danny Green.

== History ==
The band was formed in Brighton in 2008 and became part of the Willkommen Collective, the Brighton alternative folk scene which included the bands Sons of Noel and Adrian and The Leisure Society. Green was also a member of Sons of Noel and Adrian during 2008-2014.

The band's self-titled debut album was recorded at Green's home and released on Willkommen Records in December 2010. It received favourable reviews from Mojo Magazine, The Blue Walrus and Ondarock.

Laish have appeared at UK festivals including No Direction Home and End of the Road.

Their second album, Obituaries, was recorded at Green's home and was released via Folkwit Records. It received positive reviews from A Musical Priority, For Folk's Sake, Louder than War, Ondarock and Folkgeek. Songs from this album were played on BBC 6 Music Radio.

Their third album, Pendulum Swing, was released on Talitres Records on 4 November 2016. It was recorded at Watchtower Studios, Rayner's Lane, London with Dave Gerard and the first album to be recorded in a professional studio. Tracks from the album were played by BBC DJs Steve Lamacq, Bethan Elfyn, Chris Hawkins and Tom Robinson. The album received positive reviews from Americana UK, Brightons Finest, Telerama, Music Won't Save You.

The fourth Laish album, Time Elastic was released on Talitres on 16 March 2018. It was recorded at Clockwork Owl Studios, Brighton, produced by Tim Bidwell. Tracks from the album were played by BBC DJs Steve Lamacq, Chris Hawkins and Gideon Coe. The album received positive reviews from Line of Best Fit, Folk Radio, Telerama, Ondarock.

The band has performed in various line-ups including the members Emma Gatrill (accordion, clarinet, vocals), Martha Rose (violin, vocals), Dan Harding (drums), Patrick Lawrence (bass), Cathy Cardin (vocals), Ben Gregory (bass guitar), Mike Miles (drums), Jo Burke (violin, vocals), Matt Canty (bass), Tom Chadd (keyboards), Felix Weldon (Drums), Jools Owen (drums), Rob Pemberton (drums) and Jessica Weiss (vocals). Green also performs solo under the name Laish.

In 2019, Danny Green started a new band called DG Solaris. The songs were co-written with his wife, Leana. The album was produced by Green and Iggy B at Bella Union Studio, London. They released their debut album on 19 June 2020, to positive reviews from Rolling Stone, GodIsInTheTV, and Folk Radio UK, and radio play from BBC 6 Music and BBC Bristol.

There are video performances from Sofar Sounds recorded in Brighton, London and Oxford.

== Discography ==
=== Albums ===
- Laish – Willkommen (2010)
- Obituaries – Folkwit (2013)
- Pendulum Swing – Talitres (2016)
- Time Elastic – Talitres (2018)
