= Rozi Plain =

British musician

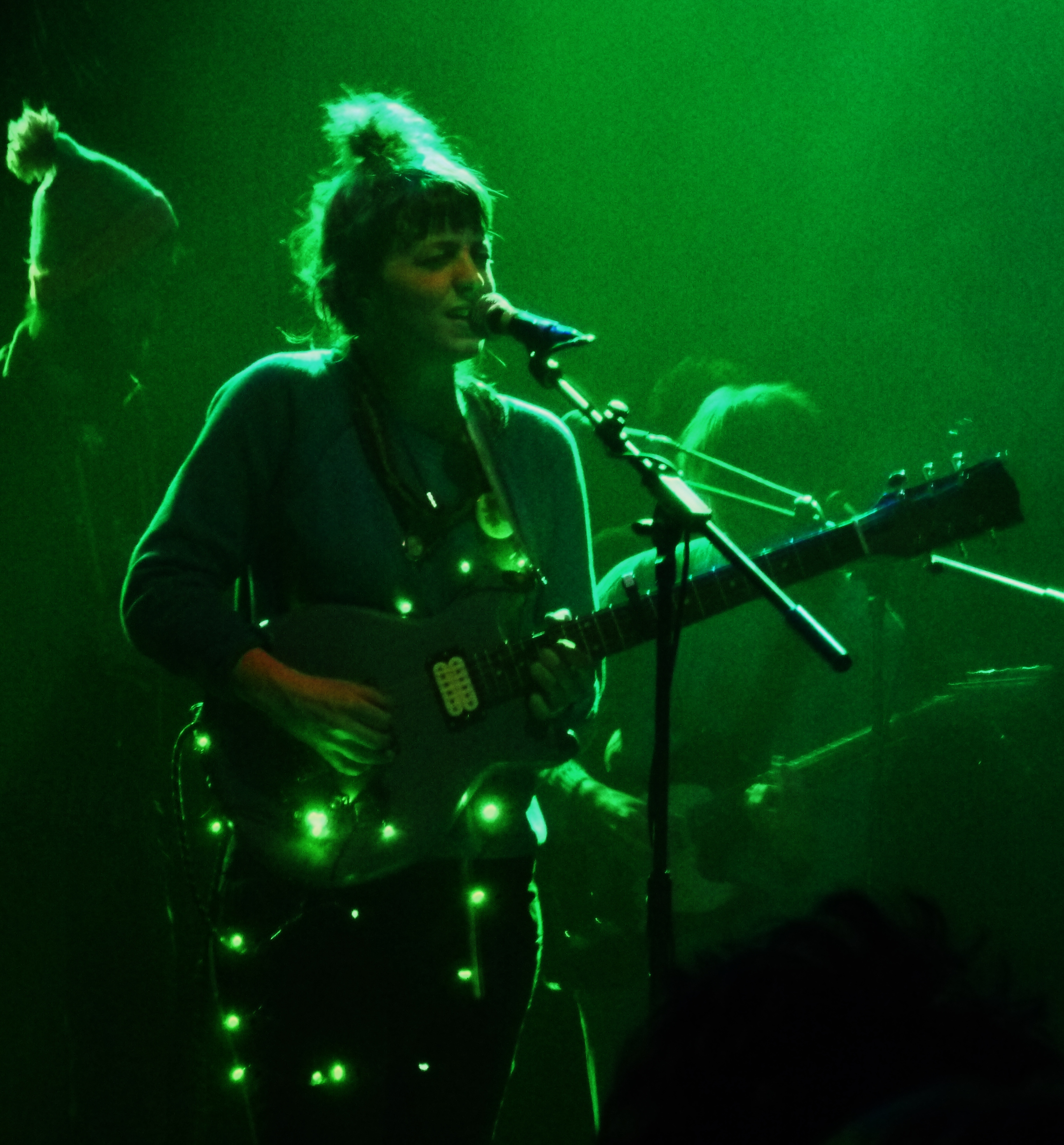
- Rozi Plain in 2012

Background information
- Birth name: Rosalind Leyden
- Origin: Winchester, England
- Genres: Folk, folk rock, alternative rock
- Labels: NeedNoWater; Lost Map Records; Talitres; Fence Records
- Website: roziplain.co.uk

Rozi Plain is a London-based musician originally from Winchester, England.

== Biography ==
Rozi Plain was born Rosalind Leyden in Winchester, England, in 1986. In 2006 she moved to Bristol to study art, and she participated in the Cleaner Records group there. She recorded two records published by King Creosote’s Fence Records, Inside Over Here (2008) and Joined Sometimes Unjoined (2012). In 2012 she moved to London.

In November 2012 she recorded a live session for Lauren Laverne's BBC Radio 6 Music show.

In 2015 Plain released a new album, Friend, followed in 2016 by a companion album of remixes, unreleased tracks and radio sessions, Friend Of A Friend. In 2019 she released What a Boost and in 2020 What a Remix.

She is a member of This Is the Kit and regularly contributes to the music of her friends, including Rachael Dadd, François & the Atlas Mountains, and Bamboo, with whom she has performed live on a number of occasions in 2016.

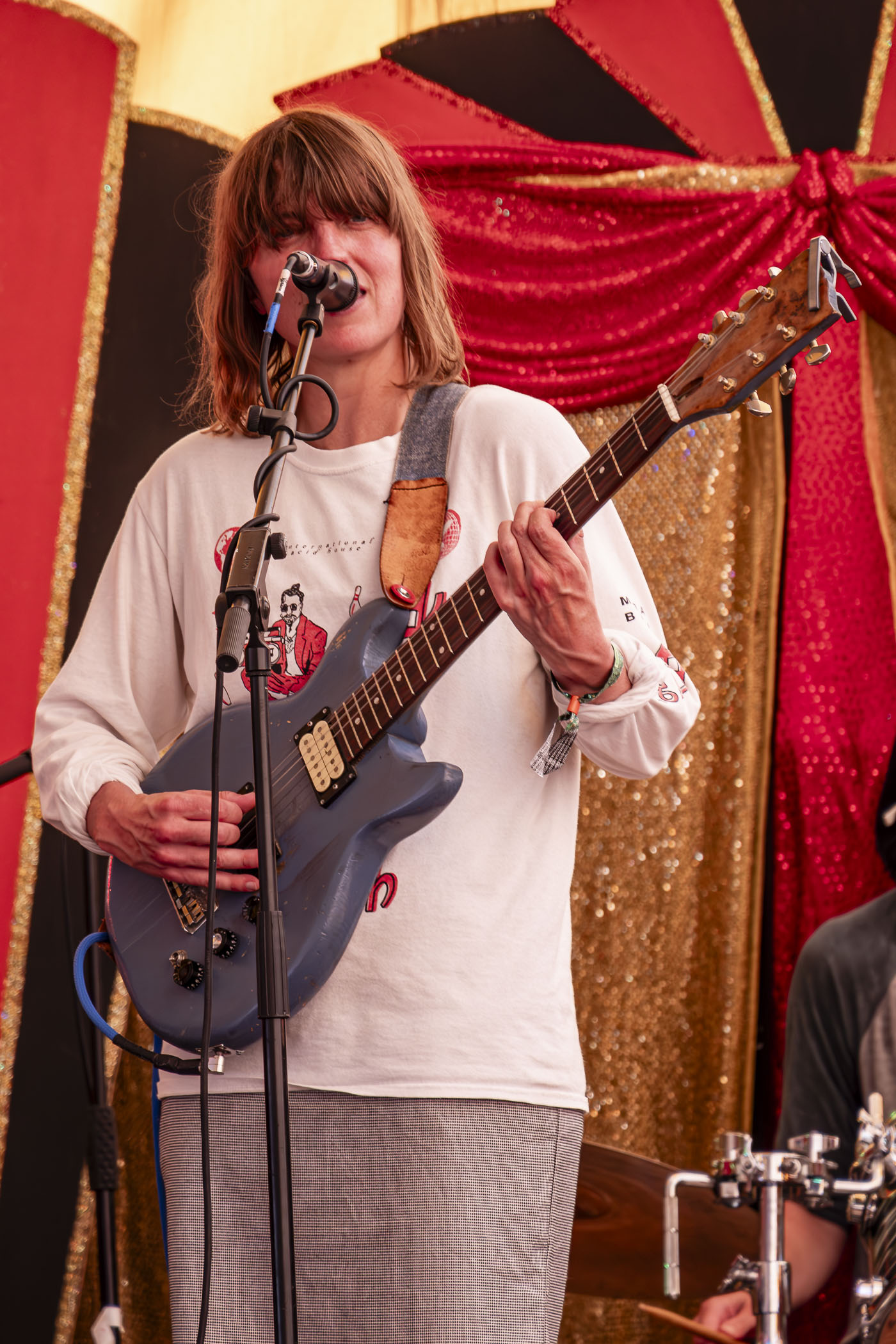
Rozi Plain performing at Glastonbury Festival in 2023

Plain has toured with the likes of Devendra Banhart, KT Tunstall and Paramore, as well as performing at Green Man Festival and End of the Road Festival.

== Discography ==
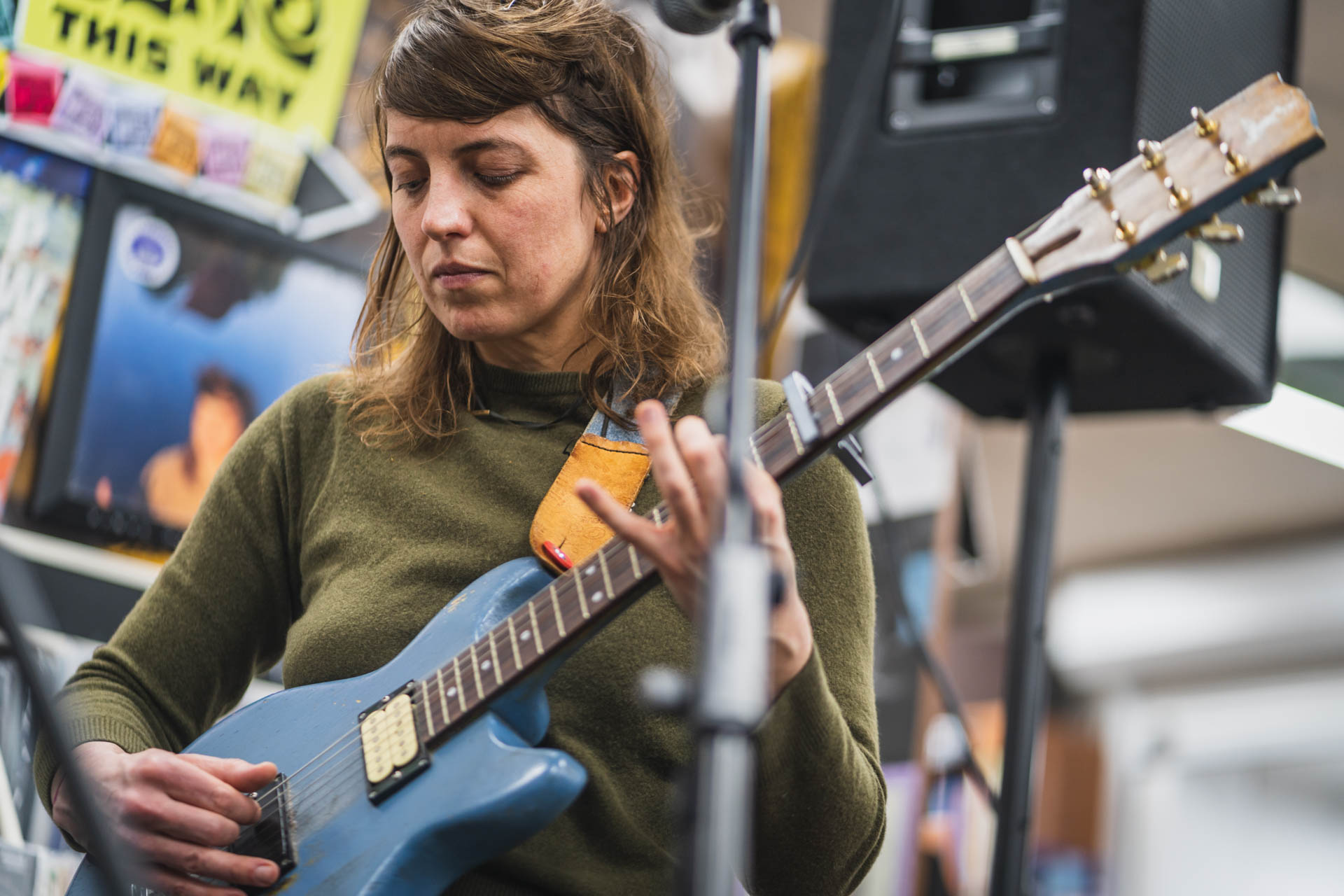
Rozi Plain at David's Music in 2023

- Inside Over Here - Fence Records (2008)
- Joined Sometimes Unjoined - Fence Records / Talitres (2012)
- Friend - Lost Map Records (2015)
- Friend of a Friend - Lost Map Records (2016)
- What a Boost - Memphis Industries (2019)
- What a Remix (2020)
- Prize (2023)
