= Bess Atwell =

- Born: Bess Harriet Hildick-Smith; 24 September 1994 (age 32)
- Genres: Indie folk; folk pop
- Instruments: Vocals; guitar
- Years active: 2016–present
- Label: Real Kind Records
- Website: www.bessatwell.com

Bess Harriet Hildick-Smith (born 24 September 1994), known professionally as Bess Atwell, is an English indie folk musician.

== Early life ==
Atwell was born in South London and grew up in Cambridgeshire and Sussex. She attended Brighton College, where she was a member of Seldon House. She began her studies at Falmouth University, but withdrew and moved to London for her career.

== Career ==
Atwell released her debut full-length album, Hold Your Mind, when she was 19 years old. Atwell released her first EP three years later, titled Big Blue. Atwell released her second full-length album in 2021 titled Already, Always. In 2024, Atwell released her third full-length album, titled Light Sleeper. The album was produced by Aaron Dessner, who had reached out to Atwell inquiring about producing her next record. The album received positive reviews.

== Artistry ==
Having begun to learn guitar via Taylor Swift songs, Atwell attended a Johnny Flynn concert with a friend, which she considers the moment "I really became influenced by music, in a way that shaped me as my own artist". Through Flynn, she discovered London's early 2010s nu-folk scene. As a teenager, she listened to the likes of Fleet Foxes, Bon Iver, Dry the River and Joni Mitchell, as well as Beach House, The National and Sharon Van Etten.

In a 2019 interview, Atwell cited an admiration for women singers such as Julia Jacklin, Stella Donnelly, Phoebe Bridgers and Soccer Mommy. Other artists Atwell has named include The Beach Boys, Gillian Welch, Lana Del Rey and Maggie Rogers.

== Discography ==
=== Studio albums ===
Title	Details
Hold Your Mind	Released: July 8, 2016; Label: Bullnose Hoop Records
Already, Always	Released: September 24, 2021; Label: Real Kind Records
Light Sleeper	Released: May 24, 2024; Label: Real Kind Records

=== Remix albums ===
Title	Details
Already, Rearranged	Released: September 16, 2022; Label: Real Kind Records

=== Extended plays ===
Title	Details
Big Blue	Released: May 24, 2019; Label: Mother's Milk Records
More Than Science	Released: August 30, 2024; Label: Real Kind Records

=== Singles ===
Title	Year	Album
"Cobbled Streets"	2016	Hold Your Mind
"Swimming Pool"	2018	Big Blue
"Grace"	2018	Big Blue
"Cherry Baby"	2019	Big Blue
"Co-op"	2021	Already, Always
"Time Comes in Roses"	2021	Already, Always
"All You Can Do"	2021	Already, Always
"Nobody"	2021	Already, Always
"Red Light Heaven"	2021	Already, Always
"Sylvester"	2023	Light Sleeper
"The Weeping"	2023	Light Sleeper
"Release Myself"	2024	Light Sleeper
"Fan Favourite"	2024	Light Sleeper
"Something Now"	2024	Light Sleeper
"Where I Left Us"	2024	More Than Science
