= Jack the Ripper (band) =

- Genres: Alternative rock; art rock
- Years active: 1995–2008
- Labels: Wagram Music; Village Vert
- Website: jack.ripper.free.fr

Jack the Ripper was a French alternative rock band active between 1995 and 2008. The name is inspired by the song of the same name of Nick Cave and the Bad Seeds.

== Band members ==
- Arnaud Mazurel: lead vocals.
- Alexandre Irissou: Piano, keyboards and Melodica.
- Hervé Mazurel: guitars.
- Dominique Martin: electric guitar and piano.
- Thierry Mazurel: bass.
- Fabrice Fenaux: drums
- Adrien Rodrigue: violin.
- Aka de Kebnekaize: trumpet.

== Discography ==
- The Book of Lies (2000, self-released)
- I'm Coming (2003, Le Village Vert)
- Ladies First (2005, Le Village Vert and Wagram Music)
