= Talitres =

French independent record label

- Founded: 2000
- Founder: Sean Bouchard, Xavier Simon
- Distributors: Differ-Ant, Shellshock, Rough Trade, Munich V2 Benelux, Audioglobe, Believe Digital
- Genre: Indie, Indie Pop, Indie Folk, Folk, Indie Rock, Slowcore
- Country of origin: France
- Location: Bordeaux
- Official website: talitres.com

Talitres, formerly known as Talitres Records, is a French independent record label based in Bordeaux, founded in 2000 and specializing in indie pop and folk music. It began as a way to release music from indie rock bands that were not distributed in France and Europe, and has expanded to include various artists from all around the world. The label has released notable records by The National, Motorama, Destroyer, François & the Atlas Mountains, Emily Jane White, and many others.

Talitres' first release was Elk City's debut album in March 2001 and has gone on to release between 5 and 8 albums each year since then.

== History ==
Talitres was founded in 2000 by Sean Bouchard and his friend Xavier Simon (who left shortly after to start his own record label Drunk Dog). Inspired by the likes of Matador Records, Secretly Canadian or Bella Union, Bouchard, a former agronomist, wanted to start a label that championed indie albums and artists that were virtually unknown to the general public in France and Europe and that were not released in these territories.

The label's first release was Elk City album Status, licensed from Parasol Records for release in Europe. It was a reasonable success, gathering praise by specialist press and generalist media alike. Many of the following albums on Talitres' discography were released under the same licensing model that allowed to put out albums much faster while reducing costs, an ideal solution for these risky early days. However, the label has gradually departed from this model, preferring instead to sign production contracts when possible. The notable releases came with The Walkmen debut album in 2002, The National Sad Songs For Dirty Lovers album in 2003 and Flotation Toy Warning Bluffer’s Guide To The Flight Deck in 2004, which gave the label its first international exposure and opened the gates for a wider repertoire of artists like The Wedding Present or The Organ, attracted by its growing notoriety and the developing touring opportunities that resulted from it.

In 2006, the shutdown of Talitres’ historical distributor Chronowax weakened the label and made it vulnerable. Understanding the need to diversify his income sources to survive, Bouchard rapidly began to handle the touring and booking of the artists himself. At the same time, he focused on the music publishing and licensing aspects in order to collect rights and royalties generated by public broadcasts and radio airplay. He also went on to develop and supervise the placement of songs from the catalogue in movies, advertising, documentaries and the whole TV network. Famous music placement include Ewert And The Two Dragons' song “In The End There's Only Love” in a McDonald's advertising campaign centered on the 2012 Summer Olympics, Le Loup's “Morning Song” for a SFR commercial in 2014 and a 2016 sync of Motorama's song “Wind In Her Hair” in a cosmetics commercial by Garnier.

In 2008, signed folk songwriter Emily Jane White who then released her album Dark Undercoat, which is still the highest grossing sale of the label to this day. White has released 5 albums on Talitres and is considered one of the primary artists of the label’s catalogue.

In March 2012, while visiting the Tallinn Music Week festival, Sean Bouchard stumbled upon the Russian post-punk band Motorama which was playing in a Design and Architecture gallery. He signed them shortly after and released their second album, “Calendar”, in November 2012. Good reviews and extensive touring in various countries allowed the band to make an impact much beyond French boundaries and helped the label to reach a larger audience. Thanks to this success, Talitres signed a contract with American record distributor MVD and allowed the label to develop itself abroad.

Talitres has continued to sign various artists and currently has a roster of 19 active bands and has released near 100 albums.

== Artists ==
=== Current Artists ===
- Rachael Dadd
- Eko & Vinda Folio
- Emily Jane White
- Feldup
- Flotation Toy Warning
- Garciaphone
- Idaho
- L'Altra
- Laish
- Maxwell Farrington (brother of Kate Farrington of Bloody Roo) & Le SuperHomard
- Micah P. Hinson
- Motorama
- R. Missing
- Rivulets
- Stranded Horse
- That Summer
- The Apartments
- The Callstore
- The Sleeping Years
- Thousand
- Tropical Popsicle
- Raoul Vignal
- Will Samson
- Will Stratton
- Утро

=== Full Roster ===
- Be My Weapon
- Brando
- Calla
- Clogs
- Dakota Suite
- Destroyer
- Early Day Miners
- Elk City
- Ewert and the Two Dragons
- Forest Fire
- François & the Atlas Mountains
- I Like Trains
- Kim Novak
- Le Loup
- Maison Neuve
- Piano Magic
- Ralfe Band
- Redjetson
- Rozi Plain
- Rubik
- Scary Mansion
- Stars Like Fleas
- Swell
- Taxi Taxi
- Tex La Homa
- The Birdwatcher
- The Organ
- The National
- The Walkmen
- The Wedding Present
- Tunng
- Verone

== See also ==
- List of record labels
