= Frànçois & the Atlas Mountains =

Pop group

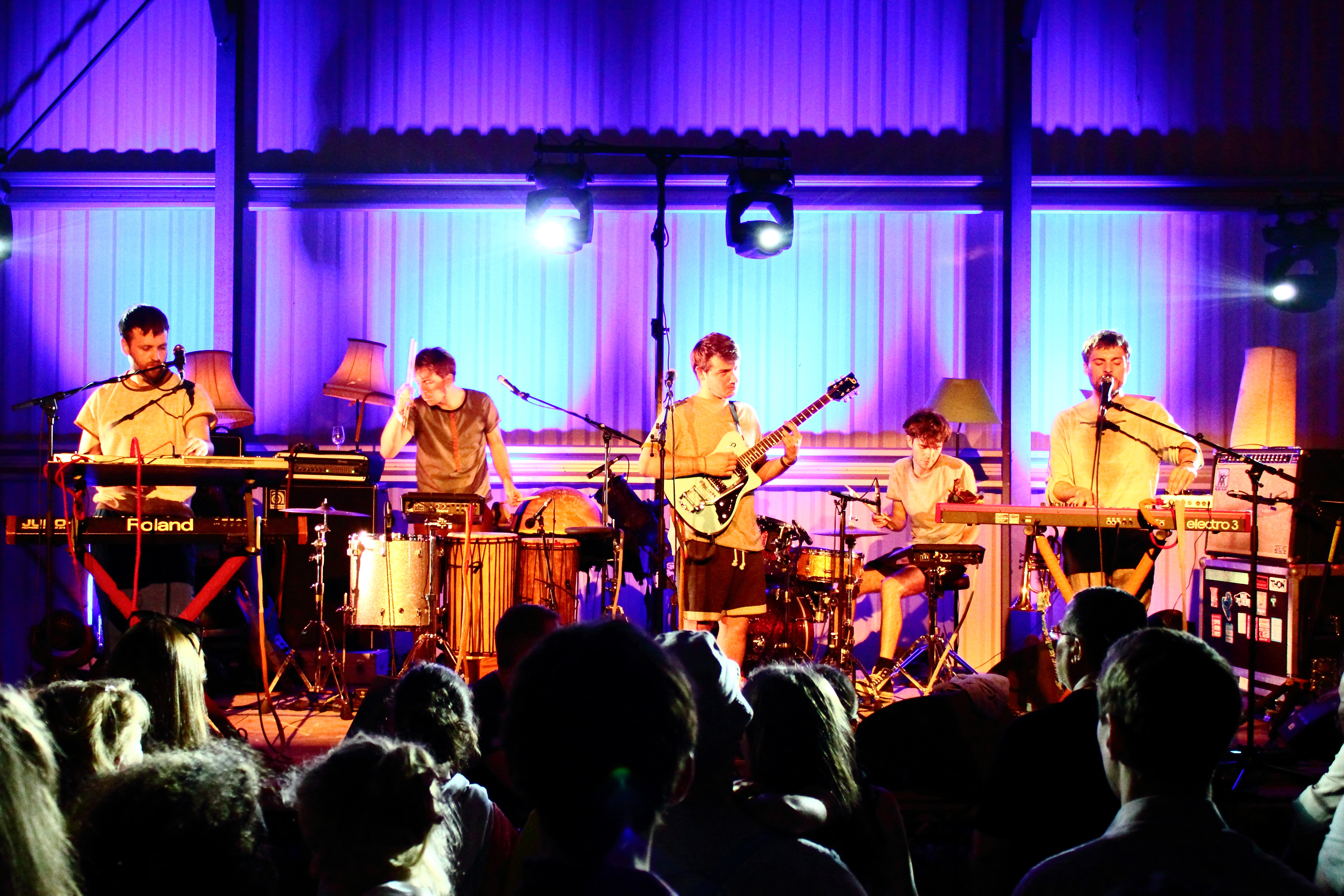
- Frànçois & the Atlas Mountains performing in 2014

Background information
- Origin: Bristol, England
- Genres: Indie pop, indie folk
- Years active: 2005–present
- Labels: Fence, Domino, Talitres
- Website: francoisandtheatlasmountains.com

Frànçois & the Atlas Mountains are a French-British pop group combining indie pop and folk pop.

== History ==
The band is led by French musician François Marry, who has also been a touring member of Camera Obscura. Other members also play in Petit Fantôme, Jaune!, Archipel and Babe. After growing up in Saintes, and studying at La Rochelle, Marry relocated to Bristol in 2003. He lived in the city for six years.

The band's first album was the mostly live The People to Forget, released in 2006 on Bristol's micro label Stitch-Stitch.

The band's second album, Plaine Inondable, was released in 2009 on Fence Records in the UK and on Talitres in France to critical acclaim, receiving a four star review from The Scotsman.

The band's third album, E Volo Love, was released in 2012 on Domino recordings, and was also positively received, with The Skinny writer Chris Buckle giving it four stars out of five and describing it as "unabashedly romantic...a study in understatement delivered with finesse", and Simon Price in The Independent describing it as "gentle indie-pop jangle with echoes of Afropop". The album received a 7/10 rating from the NME.

Marry has also released several lo-fi tapes and records.

== Musical style ==
Frànçois & the Atlas Mountains: "Il faut sortir de sa bulle"", L'Express, 22 March 2017 Marry's vocals have been described as "appealingly weedy", with a comparison made to Peter Perrett.

== Discography ==
=== Albums ===
- The People To Forget (2006), Stitch-Stitch
- Plaine Inondable (2009), Fence/Talitres
- E Volo Love (2012), Domino
- Piano Ombre (2014), Domino
- Solide Mirage (2017), Domino
- Fleurs du Mal (as Frànçois Atlas) (2018), Seline
- Banane Bleue (2021), Domino
- Âge Fleuve (2025), InFiné

=== EPs ===
- Brother (2007), Lejos Discos
- Her River Raves Recollections (2009), Stitch-Stitch
- "L'Homme Tranquille" (2015), Domino

=== Singles ===
- "Piscine" (2011), Domino
- "Les Plus Beaux" (2012), Domino
- "Gold Mountain" (2012), Domino – split single with Slow Club, released for Record Store Day
- "Edge of Town" (2012), Domino

=== Frànçois solo/other releases ===
==== Albums ====
- Frànçois et Luc – Quatre Pistes (2003), CD-R, split with Luc
- Les Anciennes Falaises (2004), Stitch-Stitch (CD-R)
- Sleeping states/Frànçois (2006), Undereducated – split cassette
- The Autoroute tapes (2004), Stitch-Stitch – cassette, limited to 20 copies
- The Nympheas tapes (2015), Iwillplaythissongonceagain – cassette, limited to 7 copies
- Oblique Imàge (2017), Another Record – cassette, limited to 150 copies

=== EPs ===
- Forests Songs (2006), Stitch-Stitch – split with Ray Rumours

==== Singles ====
- "Swimmers, Drifters" (2008), Too Pure Singles Club – split with Ray Rumours
