= Notes from the Treehouse =

Studio album by Alessi's Ark
- Released: 4 May 2009 (UK), 18 September 2012 (US)
- Genre: Folk, pop
- Label: Virgin
- Producer: Mike Mogis

Alessi's Ark chronology
Friend Ships EP (2009)	Notes from the Treehouse (2009)	Live Session (2009)

Professional ratings
Review scores
Source	Rating
BBC	(favorable)
Daily Mirror	4/5 stars
Drowned in Sound	7/10 stars
The Observer	3/5 stars

Notes from the Treehouse is the debut studio album by the British singer-songwriter Alessi Laurent-Marke, otherwise known as Alessi's Ark, released in 2009. It was produced by Mike Mogis of Bright Eyes and recorded at his studio in Omaha, Nebraska. Rough Trade also exclusively sold the album with a limited edition CD that included four acoustic tracks of songs not on the album, including a cover of Lynyrd Skynyrd's "Simple Man" and came in a sleeve with artwork by Laurent-Marke. This limited edition CD was recorded by Ben Lovett of Mumford & Sons.

The track "Memory Box" was premiered in an episode of the FOX television series Dollhouse.

The album was released in the US for the first time on 18 September 2012. The release was preceded by a competition on Alessi's Ark's website and Facebook page to design a new cover for the US version of the album, which was won by Evalie Wagner.

== Track listing ==
All songs by Alessi Laurent-Marke unless otherwise noted.

1. "Magic Weather" – 2:40
2. "The Horse" – 2:14
3. "Over The Hill" – 3:27
4. "Ribbon Lakes" – 2:43
5. "Constellations" – 5:06
6. "The Asteroids Collide" – 4:08
7. "Woman" – 2:54
8. "Memory Box" – 3:29
9. "Hummingbird" – 4:53
10. "The Dog" – 2:27
11. "Glendora" – 6:03
12. "Cotton And The Thread" – 3:01

=== iTunes Bonus Tracks ===
1. "For One Year" – 2:42
2. "King Bee" – 1:42

=== Rough Trade Bonus CD ===
1. "Witch" – 2:18
2. "Pinewoods" – 4:35
3. "Money" – 1:40
4. "Simple Man" – 3:29 (Ronnie Van Zant, Gary Rossington)

== Credits ==
- Alessi Laurent-Marke – Vocals, Guitar, Autoharp
- Mike Mogis – Guitar, Pedal Steel, bass, sequencing
- Nate Walcott – Arrangements, Organ, Vibes, Harpsichord
- Shane Aspegren – Drums
- Jake Bellows – Vocals
- Maria Taylor – Vocals
- Ian Aeillo – Assistant engineer, Electric Guitar, bass
