= List of UK Independent Album Breakers Chart number ones of the 2010s =

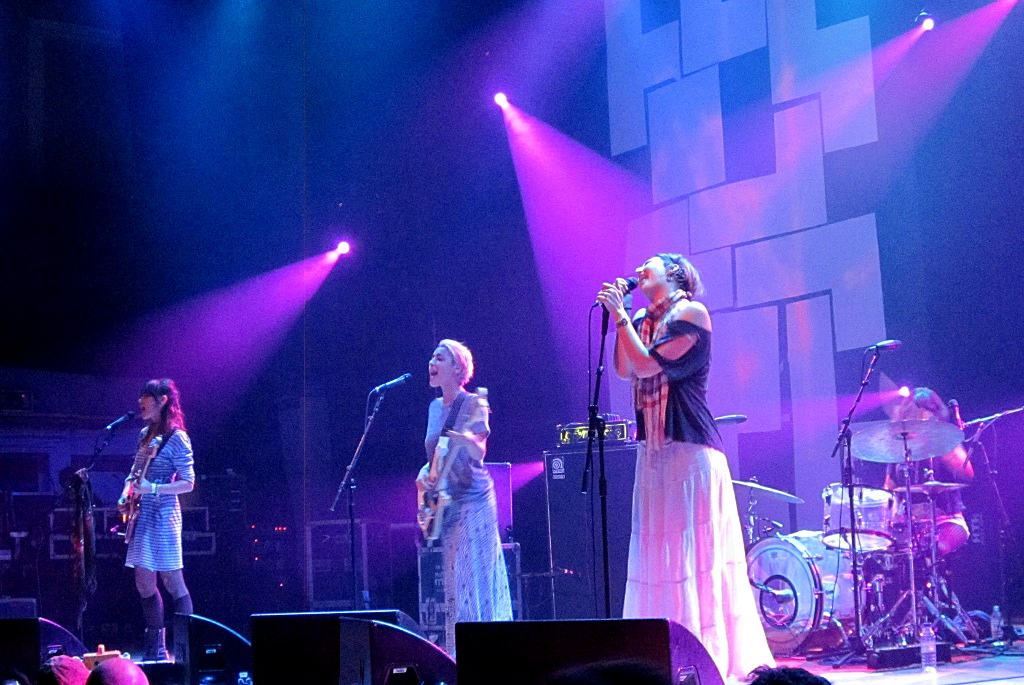
Warpaint spent four weeks at number one with their debut album The Fool.

This is the list of the number-one albums of the UK Indie Breakers Chart during the 2010s.

== Number-one albums ==
No.	Artist (Note: The artist, album, date of reaching number one and number of weeks at number one are those given by the Official Charts Company.)	Album	Record label (Note: The record labels are those given by the Official Charts Company.)	Reached number one	Weeks at number one
2010
13	Animal Collective	Merriweather Post Pavilion	Domino	9 January 2010	1
re	The xx	xx	Young Turks	16 January 2010	1
14	The Imagined Village	Empire and Love	Emmerson Cornflake	23 January 2010	1
re	The xx	xx	Young Turks	30 January 2010	1
15	Charlotte Gainsbourg	IRM	Because	6 February 2010	1
16	Beach House	Teen Dream	Bella Union	13 February 2010	1
17	Davy Knowles & Back Door Slam	Coming Up for Air	Blix Street	20 February 2010	1
18	Field Music	Field Music (Measure)	Memphis Industries	27 February 2010	1
19	Ali Farka Touré & Toumani Diabaté	Ali and Toumani	World Circuit	6 March 2010	1
20	Frightened Rabbit	The Winter of Mixed Drinks	FatCat	13 March 2010	2
21	Drive-By Truckers	The Big To-Do	PIAS	27 March 2010	1
22	General Fiasco	Buildings	Infectious	3 April 2010	1
23	London Community Gospel Choir	Glorious	Anthemic	4 April 2010	1
24	She & Him	Volume Two	Double Six	11 April 2010	1
25	Cancer Bats	Bears, Mayors, Scraps & Bones	Hassle	18 April 2010	1
26	John Grant	Queen of Denmark	Bella Union	25 April 2010	1
27	65daysofstatic	We Were Exploding Anyway	Hassle	2 May 2010	1
28	Flying Lotus	Cosmogramma	Warp	9 May 2010	2
29	Jackson Browne/David Lindley	Love Is Strange: En Vivo Con Tino	Inside	23 May 2010	1
30	Villagers	Becoming a Jackal	Domino	30 May 2010	1
31	All Time Low	Straight to DVD	Hopeless	6 June 2010	1
32	Rox	Memoirs	Rough Trade	13 June 2010	1
33	Simon Lynge	The Future	LO-MAX	20 June 2010	1
34	Harper Simon	Harper Simon	PIAS	27 June 2010	1
35	Parkway Drive	Deep Blue	Epitaph	4 July 2010	1
36	Rodrigo y Gabriela	Rodrigo y Gabriela	Ruby Works	11 July 2010	1
37	Young Guns	All Our Kings Are Dead	Live Forever	18 July 2010	2
re	Villagers	Becoming a Jackal	Domino	1 August 2010	1
38	Buckcherry	All Night Long	Eleven Seven	8 August 2010	1
39	Skream	Outside the Box	Tempa	15 August 2010	1
40	Original London cast	Legally Blonde – The Musical	First Night	22 August 2010	1
41	The Union	The Union	Payola	29 August 2010	1
42	Philip Selway	Familial	Bella Union	5 September 2010	1
re	Villagers	Becoming a Jackal	Domino	12 September 2010	1
43	The Jolly Boys featuring Albert Minott	Great Expectation	Wall of Sound	19 September 2010	2
44	The Duke & The King	Long Live The Duke & The King	Silva Oak	3 October 2010	1
45	Murray Gold	Doctor Who: Original Television Soundtrack – Series 4: The Specials	Silva Screen	10 October 2010	1
46	Danny Byrd	Rave Digger	Hospital	17 October 2010	1
47	Caro Emerald	Deleted Scenes from the Cutting Room Floor	Dramatico	24 October 2010	1
48	Warpaint	The Fool	Rough Trade	24 October 2010	2
49	Murray Gold	Doctor Who: Original Television Soundtrack – Series 5	Silva Screen	14 November 2010	1
50	A Day to Remember	What Separates Me from You	Victory	21 November 2010	3
51	Father Christmas	Father Christmas Sings	Chegwin Patrick	12 December 2010	1
52	Seven Summers	Seven Summers	Seven Summers	19 December 2010	1
re	Beach House	Teen Dream	Bella Union	26 December 2010	2
2011
re	Warpaint	The Fool	Rough Trade	9 January 2011	1
53	Ed Sheeran	No. 5 Collaborations Project	Sheeran Lock	16 January 2011	1
54	Social Distortion	Hard Times and Nursery Rhymes	Epitaph	23 January 2011	1
55	The Phoenix Foundation	Buffalo	Memphis Industries	30 January 2011	1
56	Little Comets	In Search of Elusive Little Comets	Dirty Hit	6 February 2011	1
57	The Boxer Rebellion	The Cold Still	Absentee	13 February 2011	1
58	Gruff Rhys	Hotel Shampoo	Turnstile	20 February 2011	1
59	The Low Anthem	Smart Flesh	Bella Union	27 February 2011	1
60	Ron Sexsmith	Long Player Late Bloomer	Cooking Vinyl	6 March 2011	3
61	Yellowcard	When You're Through Thinking, Say Yes	Hopeless	27 March 2011	1
62	Amon Amarth	Surtur Rising	Metal Blade	3 April 2011	1
63	Asking Alexandria	Reckless & Relentless	Sumerian	10 April 2011	2
64	Low	C'mon	Sub Pop	24 April 2011	1
65	We Are the Ocean	Go Now and Live	Hassle	1 May 2011	1
66	The Leisure Society	Into The Murky Water	Full Time Hobby	8 May 2011	1
67	Sixx:A.M.	This Is Gonna Hurt	Eleven Seven	15 May 2011	1
re	Warpaint	The Fool	Rough Trade	22 May 2011	1
68	Pete and the Pirates	One Thousand Pictures	Stolen	29 May 2011	1
69	Kitty Daisy & Lewis	Smoking in Heaven	Sunday Best	5 June 2011	1
70	City and Colour	Little Hell	Dine Alone	12 June 2011	1
71	Emmy the Great	Virtue	Close Harbour	19 June 2011	1
72	Rival Sons	Pressure & Time	Earache	26 June 2011	1
73	SBTRKT	SBTRKT	Young Turks	3 July 2011	1
74	London Philharmonic Orchestra & David Parry	The 50 Greatest Pieces of Classical Music	X5	10 July 2011	1
75	Washed Out	Within and Without	Weird World	17 July 2011	1
76	King Creosote & Jon Hopkins	Diamond Mine	Double Six	24 July 2011	1
77	Vintage Trouble	The Bomb Shelter Sessions	Vintage Trouble	31 July 2011	2
78	John Hiatt	Dirty Jeans and Mudslide Hymns	New West	14 August 2011	1
79	Jacqui Dankworth	It Happens Quietly	Specific Jazz	21 August 2011	1
80	Stephen Malkmus and the Jicks	Mirror Traffic	Domino	28 August 2011	1
81	Beirut	The Rip Tide	Pompeii	4 September 2011	1
82	The Horrible Crowes	Elsie	SideOneDummy	11 September 2011	1
83	Worship Central	Spirit Break Out	Kingsway	18 September 2011	1
84	June Tabor & Oysterband	Ragged Kingdom	Topic	25 September 2011	1
85	Half Man Half Biscuit	90 Bisodol (Crimond)	Probe Plus	2 October 2011	1
86	The Civil Wars	Barton Hollow	Sensibility	9 October 2011	2
87	M83	Hurry Up, We're Dreaming	Naïve	23 October 2011	2
88	She & Him	A Very She & Him Christmas	Double Six	6 November 2011	1
89	David Lynch	Crazy Clown Time	Sunday Best	13 November 2011	1
re	The Civil Wars	Barton Hollow	Sensibility	20 November 2011	2
90	Smith & Burrows	Funny Looking Angels	B-Unique	4 December 2011	2
91	Scala & Kolacny Brothers	Scala & Kolacny Brothers	Wall of Sound	18 December 2011	3
2012
re	SBTRKT	SBTRKT	Young Turks	8 January 2012	2
92	Howler	America Give Up	Rough Trade	22 January 2012	1
93	Rodrigo y Gabriela & C.U.B.A.	Area 52	Ruby Works	29 January 2012	1
94	Gretchen Peters	Hello Cruel World	Proper	5 February 2012	1
95	The Twilight Sad	No One Can Ever Know	Fat Cat	12 February 2012	1
96	Field Music	Plumb	Memphis Industries	19 February 2012	2
97	High Contrast	The Agony & the Ecstasy	Hospital	4 March 2012	1
98	Andrew Bird	Break It Yourself	Bella Union	11 March 2012	1
99	Grimes	Visions	4AD	18 March 2012	1
100	Jamie Hartman	3	Flat Cap	25 March 2012	1
101	Rocket Juice & the Moon	Rocket Juice & the Moon	Honest Jon's	1 April 2012	1
102	2012 cast recording	Sweeney Todd	First Night	8 April 2012	1
103	Hoodie Allen	All American	Hoodie Allen	15 April 2012	1
104	Cancer Bats	Dead Set on Living	Hassle	22 April 2012	1
105	Walter Trout	Blues for the Modern Daze	Provogue	29 April 2012	1
re	Grimes	Visions	4AD	6 May 2012	2
106	Best Coast	The Only Place	Wichita	20 May 2012	1
107	Heather Peace	Fairytales	Kaleidoscope	27 May 2012	1
108	Public Service Broadcasting	The War Room (EP)	Test Card	3 June 2012	1
109	The Walkmen	Heaven	Bella Union	10 June 2012	1
110	The Tallest Man on Earth	There's No Leaving Now	Dead Oceans	17 June 2012	1
111	Glen Hansard	Rhythm and Repose	ANTI-	24 June 2012	1
112	Metric	Synthetica	MMI	1 July 2012	1
113	Hillsong Live	Cornerstone	Hillsong	8 July 2012	1
114	Dirty Projectors	Swing Lo Magellan	Domino	15 July 2012	1
115	Tremonti	All I Was	FRET12	22 July 2012	1
116	Purity Ring	Shrines	4AD	29 July 2012	1
117	General Fiasco	Unfaithfully Yours	Dirty Hit	5 August 2012	1
118	Eugene McGuinness	The Invitation to the Voyage	Domino	12 August 2012	1
119	Karine Polwart	Traces	Hegri	19 August 2012	1
120	Bill Fay	Life is People	Dead Oceans	26 August 2012	1
121	Katatonia	Dead End Kings	Peaceville	2 September 2012	1
122	The Ukuleles	Ukuleles	DMG TV	9 September 2012	1
123	Calexico	Algiers	City Slang	16 September 2012	1
124	Joanne Shaw Taylor	Almost Always Never	Ruf	23 September 2012	1
125	As I Lay Dying	Awakened	Metal Blade	30 September 2012	1
126	Bob Mould	Silver Age	Edsel	7 October 2012	1
127	Sylosis	Monolith	Nuclear Blast	14 October 2012	1
128	Godspeed You! Black Emperor	'Allelujah! Don't Bend! Ascend!	Constellation	21 October 2012	2
129	Parkway Drive	Atlas	Epitaph	4 November 2012	1
130	Poliça	Give You the Ghost	Memphis Industries	11 November 2012	1
131	Motionless in White	Infamous	Fearless	18 November 2012	1
132	Christmas Hits Collective	Worlds Greatest Xmas Hits 2012	Lushgroove	25 November 2012	6
2013
133	Andy Burrows	Company	PIAS	6 January 2013	1
134	Jack Savoretti	Before the Storm	Fullfill	13 January 2013	1
135	Yo La Tengo	Fade	Matador	20 January 2013	1
136	Matthew E. White	Big Inner	Domino	27 January 2013	1
137	Local Natives	Hummingbird	Infectious	3 February 2013	1
138	Ron Sexsmith	Forever Endeavour	Cooking Vinyl	10 February 2013	1
139	Macklemore & Ryan Lewis	The Heist	Macklemore	17 February 2013	2
140	Caitlin Rose	The Stand-In	Names	3 March 2013	1
re	Macklemore & Ryan Lewis	The Heist	Macklemore	10 March 2013	1
141	Worship Central	Let It Be Known	Integrity	17 March 2013	1
142	Low	The Invisible Way	Sub Pop	24 March 2013	1
143	Bonobo	The North Borders	Ninja Tune	31 March 2013	1
re	Macklemore & Ryan Lewis	The Heist	Macklemore	7 April 2013	1
144	Kurt Vile	Wakin on a Pretty Daze	Matador	14 April 2013	1
re	Macklemore & Ryan Lewis	The Heist	Macklemore	21 April 2013	1
re	Kurt Vile	Wakin on a Pretty Daze	Matador	28 April 2013	1
145	Neon Neon	Praxis Makes Perfect	Lex	5 May 2013	1
146	Valerie June	Pushin' Against a Stone	Sunday Best	12 May 2013	1
147	She & Him	Volume 3	Double Six	19 May 2013	1
148	The Dillinger Escape Plan	One of Us Is the Killer	Party Smasher	26 May 2013	1
149	Mount Kimbie	Cold Spring Fault Less Youth	Warp	2 June 2013	1
150	City and Colour	The Hurry and the Harm	Dine Alone	9 June 2013	1
151	Jagwar Ma	Howlin'	Marathon	16 June 2013	1
152	Falling in Reverse	Fashionably Late	Epitaph	23 June 2013	1
153	Fat Freddy's Drop	Blackbird	The Drop	30 June 2013	1
154	Hillsong Live	Glorious Ruins	Hillsong	7 July 2013	1
155	Letlive.	The Blackest Beautiful	Epitaph	14 July 2013	1
156	Edward Sharpe and the Magnetic Zeros	Up from Below	Rough Trade	21 July 2013	2
157	Martin Simpson	Vagrant Stanzas	Topic	4 August 2013	1
158	Moderat	II	MonkeyTown	11 August 2013	1
re	Edward Sharpe and the Magnetic Zeros	Up from Below	Rough Trade	18 August 2013	1
159	Drenge	Drenge	Infectious	25 August 2013	1
160	Foy Vance	Joy of Nothing	Glassnote	1 September 2013	1
161	Volcano Choir	Repave	Jagjaguwar	8 September 2013	1
162	Factory Floor	Factory Floor	DFA	15 September 2013	1
163	Bill Callahan	Dream River	Drag City	22 September 2013	1
164	Anathema	Universal	Kscope	29 September 2013	1
165	Johnny Flynn	Country Mile	Transgressive	6 October 2013	1
166	Full English	The Full English	Topic	13 October 2013	1
167	Jonathan Wilson	Fanfare	Bella Union	20 October 2013	1
168	Hot Since 82	Little Black Book	Moda Black	27 October 2013	1
169	White Denim	Corsicana Lemonade	Downtown	3 November 2013	1
170	Etherwood	Etherwood	Hospital	10 November 2013	1
171	Wooden Shjips	Back To Land	Thrill Jockey	17 November 2013	1
172	Soul Survivor & Momentum	The Flood	Integrity	24 November 2013	1
173	Pierce the Veil	Collide with the Sky	Fearless	1 December 2013	1
re	Christmas Hits Collective	Worlds Greatest Xmas Hits 2012	Lushgroove	8 December 2013	2
174	We the Kings	Somewhere Somehow	We the Kings	22 December 2013	1
re	Christmas Hits Collective	Worlds Greatest Xmas Hits 2012	Lushgroove	29 December 2013	1
2014
re	We the Kings	Somewhere Somehow	We the Kings	5 January 2014	1
175	Stephen Malkmus and the Jicks	Wig Out at Jagbags	Domino	12 January 2014	1
176	DVS	London Boy American Dreaming	DVS	19 January 2014	1
177	Damien Jurado	Brothers and Sisters of the Eternal Son	Secretly Canadian	26 January 2014	1
178	Above & Beyond	Acoustic	Anjunabeats	2 February 2014	1
179	Behemoth	The Satanist	Nuclear Blast	9 February 2014	1
180	Sun Kil Moon	Benji	Calde Verde	16 February 2014	1
181	Oysterband	Diamonds on the Water	Navigator	23 February 2014	1
re	Full English	The Full English	Topic	2 March 2014	1
182	Real Estate	Atlas	Domino	9 March 2014	1
183	Withered Hand	New Gods	Fortuna Pop!	16 March 2014	1
184	Freddie Gibbs and Madlib	Pinata	Madlib Invazion	23 March 2014	1
185	Future Islands	Singles	4AD	30 March 2014	2
186	Delain	The Human Contradiction	Napalm	13 April 2014	1
187	Amazing Snakeheads	Amphetamine Ballads	Domino	20 April 2014	1
188	Edguy	Space Police - Defenders of the Crown	Nuclear Blast	27 April 2014	1
189	Devil You Know	The Beauty of Destruction	Nuclear Blast	4 May 2014	1
190	Eno & Hyde	Someday World	Warp	11 May 2014	1
191	Killer Be Killed	Killer Be Killed	Nuclear Blast	18 May 2014	1
192	Cara Dillon	A Thousand Hearts	Charcoal	25 May 2014	1
193	Möngöl Hörde	Möngöl Hörde	Xtra Mile	1 June 2014	1
194	Moulettes	Constellations	Navigator	8 June 2014	1
195	Janet Devlin	Running with Scissors	Insomnia	15 June 2014	1
196	The Antlers	Familiars	Transgressive	22 June 2014	1
197	Ab-Soul	These Days...	Top Dawg	29 June 2014	1
198	Hillsong Worship	No Other Name	Hillsong	6 July 2014	2
199	Suicide Silence	You Can't Stop Me	Nuclear Blast	20 July 2014	1
200	Ward Thomas	From Where We Stand	WTW Music	27 July 2014	1
201	Blues Pills	Blue Pills	Nuclear Blast	3 August 2014	1
202	Alestorm	Sunset on the Golden Age	Napalm	10 August 2014	1
203	G Frsh	Alfie	Frsh	17 August 2014	1
204	Benjamin Booker	Benjamin Booker	Rough Trade	24 August 2014	1
205	The Wytches	Annabel Dream Reader	Heavenly	31 August 2014	1
206	HammerFall	(r)Evolution	Nuclear Blast	7 September 2014	1
207	Karen O	Crush Songs	Cult	14 September 2014	1
208	Motionless In White	Reincarnate	Fearless	21 September 2014	1
209	Joanne Shaw Taylor	The Dirty Truth	Axehouse	28 September 2014	1
re	Future Islands	Singles	4AD	5 October 2014	2
210	Exodus	Blood In, Blood Out	Nuclear Blast	19 October 2014	1
211	Half Man Half Biscuit	Urge for Offal	Probe Plus	26 October 2014	1
212	Blade Brown	Bags and Boxes 3	Blade Brown	2 November 2014	1
213	Xcerts	There Is Only You	Raygun	9 November 2014	1
214	hookworms	The Hum	Weird World	16 November 2014	1
215	Tony Wright	Thoughts N All	Woodcut	23 November 2014	1
re	Future Islands	Singles	4AD	30 November 2014	7
2015
216	Panda Bear	Panda Bear Meets the Grim Reaper	Domino	18 January 2015	1
217	Viet Cong	Viet Cong	Jagjaguwar	25 January 2015	1
218	Kitty, Daisy & Lewis	The Third	Sunday Best	1 February 2015	1
219	John Carpenter	Lost Themes	Sacred Bones	8 February 2015	1
220	London Cast Recordings	Memphis the Musical	First Night	15 February 2015	1
221	Carl Barât and The Jackals	Let It Reign	Cooking Vinyl	22 February 2015	1
222	Falling In Reverse	Just Like You	Epitaph	1 March 2015	1
223	Ghostpoet	Shedding Skin	Play It Again Sam	8 March 2015	1
224	Skints	FM	East Star	15 March 2015	1
225	Tobias Jesso Jr.	Goon	True Panther	22 March 2015	1
226	Lonelady	Hinterland	Warp	29 March 2015	1
227	8:58	8:58	ACP	5 April 2015	1
228	Nadine Shah	Fast Food	Apollo	12 April 2015	1
229	The Leisure Society	The Fine Art of Hanging On	Full Time Hobby	19 April 2015	1
230	Tom DeLonge	To the Stars... Demos, Odds and Ends	To the Stars	26 April 2015	1
231	MG	MG	Mute	3 May 2015	1
232	My Morning Jacket	The Waterfall	ATO	10 May 2015	1
233	Cathal Smyth	A Comfortable Man	The Phoenix Rising	17 May 2015	1
234	The Story So Far	The Story So Far	Pure Noise	24 May 2015	1
235	Unknown Mortal Orchestra	Multi-Love	Jagjaguwar	31 May 2015	1
236	Sun Kil Moon	Universal Themes	Rough Trade	7 June 2015	1
237	LaFontaines	Class	889	14 June 2015	1
238	Hudson Mohawke	Lantern	Warp	21 June 2015	1
239	Andreya Triana	Giants	Counter	28 June 2015	1
re	Future Islands	Singles	4AD	3 July 2015	2
240	Fourtet	Morning/Evening	Text	17 July 2015	2
re	Andreya Triana	Giants	Counter	31 July 2015	1
241	Michael Head	The Magical World of the Strands	Megaphone	7 August 2015	1
242	J Spades	GRT	MMMP	14 August 2015	1
243	United Pursuit	Simple Gospel	United Pursuit	21 August 2015	1
244	The Bohicas	The Making Of	Domino	28 August 2015	1
245	Yo La Tengo	Stuff Like That There	Matador	4 September 2015	1
246	Etherwood	Blue Leaves	Hospital	11 September 2015	1
247	Jay Rock	90059	Top Dawg	18 September 2015	1
248	Dave Rawlings Machine	Nashville Obsolete	Acony	25 September 2015	1
249	Sexwitch	Sexwitch	Echo	2 October 2015	1
250	The Winery Dogs	Hot Streak	earMUSIC	9 October 2015	1
251	Mayday Parade	Black Lines	Fearless	16 October 2015	1
252	Deerhunter	Fading Frontier	4AD	23 October 2015	1
253	Walter Trout	Battle Scars	Provogue	30 October 2015	1
254	El Vy	Return To the Moon	4AD	6 November 2015	1
255	Floating Points	Elaenia	Pluto	13 November 2015	1
256	Skrapz	The End of the Beginning	Skrapz	20 November 2015	1
257	C Duncan	Architect	Fat Cat	27 November 2015	1
258	PVRIS	White Noise	Rise	4 December 2015	1
259	Sikth	Opacities	Peaceville	11 December 2015	1
260	Kamasi Washington	The Epic	Brainfeeder	18 December 2015	1
261	Baroness	Purple	Abraxan Hymns	25 December 2015	1
2016
re	PVRIS	White Noise	Rise	1 January 2016	2
262	Hinds	Leave Me Alone	Lucky Number	15 January 2016	1
263	Show of Hands	The Long way Home	Hands on Music	22 January 2016	1
264	Fat White Family	Songs for Our Mothers	Without Consent	29 January 2016	1
265	Avantasia	Ghostlights	Nuclear Blast	5 February 2016	1
266	DIIV	Is the Is Are	Captured Tracks	12 February 2016	1
267	Mikey Bromley	This One's for You	Geoma	19 February 2016	1
268	Cavern of Anti-Matter	Void beats/Invocation Trex	Duophonic	26 February 2016	1
269	SVIIB	School of Seven Bells	Full Time Hobby	4 March 2016	1
270	Unloved	Guilty Of Love	Unloved	11 March 2016	1
271	CJ Wildheart	Robot	Devilspit	18 March 2016	1
272	Richmond Fontaine	You Can't Go Back If There's Nothing to	Decor	25 March 2016	1
273	Bob Mould	Patch the Sky	Merge	2 April 2016	1
274	Moderat	III	Monkeytown	9 April 2016	1
275	Teleman	Brilliant Sanity	Moshi	16 April 2016	1
276	John Carpenter	Lost Themes II	Sacred Bones	23 April 2016	1
re	PVRIS	White Noise	Rise	30 April 2016	1
277	The Jayhawks	Paging Mr. Proust	Sham	7 May 2016	1
278	The Rides	Pierced Arrow	Provogue	14 May 2016	1
279	Hatebreed	The Concrete Confessional	Nuclear Blast	21 May 2016	1
280	Katatonia	The Fall of Hearts	Peaceville	28 May 2016	1
281	Thrice	To Be Everywhere Is to Be Nowhere	Vagrant	4 June 2016	1
282	Minor Victories	Minor Victories	Play It Again Sam	11 June 2016	1
283	Letlive	If I'm the Devil	Epitaph	18 June 2016	1
284	Walter Trout	Alive In Amsterdam	Provogue	25 June 2016	1
285	The Felice Brothers	Life in the Dark	Yep Roc	2 July 2016	1
286	Beyond The Wizard's Sleeve	The Soft Bounce	Phantasy	9 July 2016	1
287	BadBadNotGood	IV	Innovative Leisure	16 July 2016	1
288	Bright Light Bright Light	Choreography	Self Raising	23 July 2016	1
289	Lou Rhodes	Theyesandeye	Nude	30 July 2016	1
290	Chris Robinson Brotherhood	Anyway You Love We Know How You Feel	Mega Force	6 August 2016	1
291	Tarja	The Shadow Self	earMUSIC	13 August 2016	1
292	Kyle Dixon & Michael Stein	Stranger Things Vol. 1 OST	Lakeshore	20 August 2016	1
293	Slow Club	One Day All of This Won't Matter Anymore	Moshi Moshi	27 August 2016	1
294	Delain	Moonbathers	Napalm	3 September 2016	1
295	Shaun Escoffery	Evergreen	Dome	10 September 2016	1
296	67	Let's Lurk	6ix 7even	17 September 2016	1
297	Keaton Henson	Kindly Now	Play It Again Sam	24 September 2016	1
298	Every Time I Die	Low Teens	Epitaph	1 October 2016	1
299	Epica	The Holographic Principle	Nuclear Blast	8 October 2016	1
300	Goat	Requiem	Rocket	15 October 2016	1
301	Dillinger Escape Plan	Dissociation	Party Smasher	22 October 2016	1
302	King King	Live	Manhaton	29 October 2016	1
303	Frank Iero & the Patience	Parachutes	Hassle	5 November 2016	1
304	Honeyblood	Babies Never Die	Fat Cat	12 November 2016	1
305	In Flames	Battles	Nuclear Blast	19 November 2016	1
306	Cara Dillon	Upon a Winter's Night	Charcoal	26 November 2016	1
307	P Money	Live and Direct	Rinse Recordings	3 December 2016	1
re	Kyle Dixon & Michael Stein	Stranger Things Vol. 1 OST	Lakeshore	10 December 2016	2
re	Cara Dillon	Upon a Winter's Night	Charcoal	24 December 2016	1
re	BadBadNotGood	IV	Innovative Leisure	31 December 2016	1
2017
308	Caravan Palace	Robot	MVKA	7 January 2017	1
309	Dropkick Murphys	11 Short Stories of Pain & Glory	Born & Bred	14 January 2017	1
310	Cavern of Anti-Matter	Blood Drums	Duophonic	21 January 2017	1
311	Courtney Marie Andrews	Honest Life	Loose	28 January 2017	1
312	Kreator	Gods of Violence	Nuclear Blast	3 February 2017	1
313	Eliza Carthy and Wayward Band	Big Machine	Topic	10 February 2017	1
314	Blackfield	Blackfield V	Kscope	17 February 2017	1
315	Dutch Uncles	Big Ballon	Memphis Industries	24 February 2017	1
316	Los Campesinos!	Sick Scenes	Wichita	3 March 2017	1
317	Blanck Mass	World Eater	Sacred Bones	10 March 2017	1
318	Hurray for the Riff Raff	The Navigator	ATO	17 March 2017	1
319	Spoon	Hot Thoughts	Matator	24 March 2017	1
320	The Moonlandingz	Interplanetary Class Classics	Transgressive	31 March 2017	1
321	Chris Catalyst	Life is Often Brilliant	Wrath	7 April 2017	1
322	Blaenavon	That's Your Lot	Transgressive	14 April 2017	1
323	Fionn Regan	The Meetings of the Waters	Abbey	21 April 2017	1
324	Black Angels	Death Song	Partisan	28 April 2017	1
325	Ayreon	The Source	Music Theories	5 May 2017	1
326	Perfume Genius	No Shape	Matador	12 May 2017	1
327	Justin Currie	This Is My Kingdom Now	Endless Shipwreck	19 May 2017	1
328	Jane Weaver	Modern Kosmology	Fire	26 May 2017	1
329	Alestorm	No Grave But the Sea	Napalm	2 June 2017	1
330	Sikth	The Future in Whose Eyes?	Peaceville	9 June 2017	1
331	Original Broadway Cast	Anastasia	Broadway	16 June 2017	1
332	Can	The Singles	Mute/Spoon	23 June 2017	1
333	King Gizzard & the Lizard Wizard	Murder of the Universe	Heavenly	6 July 2017	1
334	Peter Perrett	How the West was Won	Domino	13 July 2017	1
335	This Is the Kit	Moonshine Freeze	Rough Trade	20 July 2017	1
336	Out in the Storm	Waxahatchee	Merge	27 July 2017	1
337	Kenny Wayne Shepherd	Lay It On Down	Provogue	3 August 2017	1
338	Earl	Tongue Tied	BMG	10 August 2017	1
339	Lal & Mike Waterson	Bright Phoebus	Domino	17 August 2017	1
340	David Rawlings	Poor Davids Almanack	Acony	24 August 2017	1
341	Charlie Sloth	The Plug	Grimey Limey	31 August 2017	1
342	Nadine Shah	Holiday Destination	1965	7 September 2017	1
343	Walter Trout	We're All in this Together	Provogue	14 September 2017	1
344	Threshold	Legends of the Shires	Nuclear Blast	21 September 2017	1
345	Arcane Roots	Melancholia Hymns	Easy Life	28 September 2017	1
346	The Bronx	V	5B	5 October 2017	1
347	Kamasi Washington	Harmony of Difference	Young Turks	12 October 2017	1
348	Kelela	Take Me Apart	Warp	19 October 2017	1
349	Cara Dillon	Wanderer	Charcoal	26 October 2017	1
350	Michael Head & The Red Elastic Band	Adios Senor Pussycat	Violette	2 November 2017	1
351	Baxter Dury	Prince of Tears	Pias Le Label	9 November 2017	1
352	Converge	The Dusk n Us	Epitaph	16 November 2017	1
353	Cannibal Corpse	Red Before Black	Metal Blade	23 November 2017	1
354	Charlotte Gainsbourg	Rest	Because Music	30 November 2017	2
355	Alien Stadium	Livin' In Elizabethan Times	Domino	14 December 2017	1
356	Idles	Brutalism	Balley	21 December 2017	1
357	2017 London Cast	4nd Street	First Night	28 December 2017	1
2018
358	Gerry Cinnamon	Erratic Cinematic	LR	4 January 2018	1
re	Baxter Dury	Prince of Tears	Pias Le Label	11 January 2018	2
359	Corrosion of Conformity	No Cross No Crown	Nuclear Blast	25 January 2018	1
360	Tune-Yards	I Can Feel You Creep Into My Private Life	4AD	1 February 2018	1
361	Phil Campbell & Bastard Sons	The Age of Absurdity	Nuclear Blast	8 February 2018	1
362	Ty Segall	Freedom's Goblin	Drag City	15 February 2018	1
363	Beth Nielsen Chapman	Heart's of Glass	BNG	22 February 2018	1
364	Car Seat Headrest	Twin Fantasy (Face to Face)	Matador	1 March 2018	1
365	Fever Ray	Plunge	Rabid	8 March 2018	1
366	Jonathan Wilson	Rare Birds	Bella Union	15 March 2018	1
367	Turbowolf	The Free Life	Spinefarm Records	22 March 2018	1
368	Yo La Tengo	There's a Riot Going On	Matador	29 March 2018	1
369	Courtney Marie Andrews	May Your Kindness Remain	Loose Music	5 April 2018	1
370	Carrie Hope Fletcher	When the Curtain Falls	2300	12 April 2018	1
370	Unknown Mortal Orchestra	Sex & Food	Jagjaguwar	19 April 2018	1
371	John Prine	The Tree of Forgiveness	Oh Boy	26 April 2018	1
372	Tesseract	Sonder	Kscope	3 May 2018	1
373	Original West End Cast	Everybody's Talking About Jamie	Margaret New Limited	10 May 2018	1
374	Dimmu Borgir	Eonian	Nuclear Blast	17 May 2018	1
375	Bad Wolves	Disobey	Eleven Seven	24 May 2018	1
376	Stephen Malkmus and the Jicks	Sparkle Hard	Domino	31 May 2018	1
377	Kamaal Williams	The Return	Warp	7 June 2018	1
378	Neko-Case	Hell-On	Anti	14 June 2018	1
379	Boy Azooga	1 2 Kung Fu	Heavenly	21 June 2018	1
380	Rolling Blackouts Coastal	Hope Downs	Sub Pop	28 June 2018	1
381	Margaret Keys	The Gift of Music	Tadlow Music	5 July 2018	1
382	The Interrupters	Fight the Good Fight	Hellcat	12 July 2018	1
383	Bodega	Endless Scroll	What's Your Rupture	19 July 2018	1
384	Deafheaven	Ordinary Corrupt Human Love	Anti	26 July 2018	1
385	Powerwolf	The Sacrament of Sin	Napalm/Handels	2 August 2018	1
386	Spitfires	Year Zero	Hatch	9 August 2018	1
re	Gerry Cinnamon	Erratic Cinematic	LR	16 August 2018	1
387	Magpie Salute	High Water I	Provogue	23 August 2018	1
388	Oh Sees	Smote Reverser	Castle Face	30 August 2018	1
389	The Lemon Twigs	Go to School	4AD	6 September 2018	1
390	Clare Bowen	Clare Bowen	BMG	13 September 2018	1
391	Boston Manor	Welcome to the Neighbourhood	Pure Noise	20 September 2018	1
392	Fatherson	Sum of All Your Parts	Easy Life	27 September 2018	1
393	Blinders	Columbia	Modern Sky	4 October 2018	1
394	Pigs Pigs Pigs Pigs	King of Cowards	Rocket	11 October 2018	1
395	Behemoth	I Loved You at Your Darkest	Nuclear Blast	18 October 2018	1
396	John Hiatt	The Eclipse Sessions	New West	25 October 2018	1
397	Karine Polwart	Laws of Motion	Hudson	1 November 2018	1
398	John Carpenter	Halloween OST	Sacred Bones	8 November 2018	1
399	Dead Can Dance	Dionysus	PIAS	15 November 2018	1
400	J Mascis	Elastic Days	Sub Pop	22 November 2018	1
401	Anderson Paak	Oxnard	Aftermath/12 Tone	29 November 2018	1
re	Gerry Cinnamon	Erratic Cinematic	LR	6 December 2018	1
402	House and Garage Orchestra	Garage Classics	New State	13 December 2018	1
403	Ashton Lane	The In-Between	Oc	20 December 2018	1
404	King's College Choir,David Willcocks,Philip Ledger	100 Years of Nine Lessons & Carols	King's College, Cambridge	27 December 2018	2
2019
re	Rolling Blackouts Coastal	Hope Downs	Sub Pop	10 January 2019	1
405	She Drew the Gun	Revolution of Mind	Skeleton Key	17 January 2019	1
406	The Delines	The Imperial	Decor	24 January 2019	1
407	Deerhunter	Why Hasn't Everything Already Disappeared?	4AD	31 January 2019	1
408	Blood Red Shoes	Get Tragic	Jazz Life	7 February 2019	1
409	Ex Re	Ex Re	4AD	14 February 2019	1
410	Bob Mould	Sunshine Rock	Merge	21 February 2019	1
411	Pye Corner Audio	Hollow Earth	Ghost Box	28 February 2019	1
412	Julia Jacklin	Crushing	Transgressive	7 March 2019	1
413	In Flames	I, the Mask	Nuclear Blast	14 March 2019	1
414	Snapped Ankles	Stunning Luxury	Leaf	21 March 2019	1
415	Francis Rossi & Hannah Rickard	We Talk Too Much	earMUSIC	28 March 2019	1
416	These New Puritans	Inside the Rose	Infectious	4 April 2019	1
417	Simple Creatures	Strange Love	BMG	11 April 2019	1
418	PUP	Morbid Stuff	Rise	18 April 2019	1
419	Tom Speight	Collide	Tom Speight	25 April 2019	1
420	Grand Magus	Wolf God	Nuclear Blast	2 May 2019	1
421	Ezra Collective	You Can't Steal My Joy	Enter the Jungle	9 May 2019	1
422	Guy Chambers	Go Gentle Into the Night	BMG	16 May 2019	1
423	The Skints	Swimming Lessons	Mr Bongo	23 May 2019	1
424	Skipinnish	Steer by the Stars	Skipinnish	30 May 2019	1
425	Stray Cats	40	Mascot	6 June 2019	1
426	Pip Blom	Boat	Heavenly	13 June 2019	1
427	Peter Perrett	Human World	Domino	20 June 2019	1
428	Baroness	Gold & Grey	Abraxan Hymns	27 June 2019	1
429	Black Midi	Schlagenheim	Rough Trade	4 July 2019	1
430	Jeff Williams	RWBY Vol. 6 Ost	Rooster Teeth	11 July 2019	1
431	Jesca Hoop	Stonechild	Memphis Industries	18 July 2019	1
432	Purple Mountains	Purple Mountains	Drag City	25 July 2019	1
433	Ramin Djawadi	Game of Thrones: Season 8 (soundtrack)	WaterTower Music	1 August 2019	1
434	Thy Art Is Murder	Human Target	Nuclear Blast	8 August 2019	1
435	Ty Segall	First Taste	Drag City	15 August 2019	1
436	P. P. Arnold	The New Adventures of	earMUSIC	22 August 2019	1
437	Blanck Mass	Animated Violence Mild	Sacred Bones	29 August 2019	1
438	The Night Café	0151	The Night Café	5 September 2019	1
439	Caravan Palace	Chronologic	MVKA	12 September 2019	1
440	Lindsey Stirling	Artemis	BMG	19 September 2019	1
441	Kris Barras Band	Light It Up	Provogue	26 September 2019	1
442	Samantha Fish	Kill of be Kind	Rounder	3 October 2019	1
443	Show of Hands	Battlefield Dance Floor	Proper	10 October 2019	1
444	Flying Colors	Third Degree	Music Theories	17 October 2019	1
445	Richard Dawson	2020	Weird World	24 October 2019	1
446	Magpie Salute	High Water II	Provogue	31 October 2019	1
447	Phil Campbell	Old Lions Still Roar	Nuclear Blast	7 November 2019	1
448	Peppa Pig	My First Album	Eone Music	14 November 2019	2
449	Ronnie Wood and His Wild Five	Mad Lad - A Live Tribute to Chuck Berry	BMG	28 November 2019	1
re	Peppa Pig	My First Album	Eone Music	5 December 2019	6

=== By artist ===
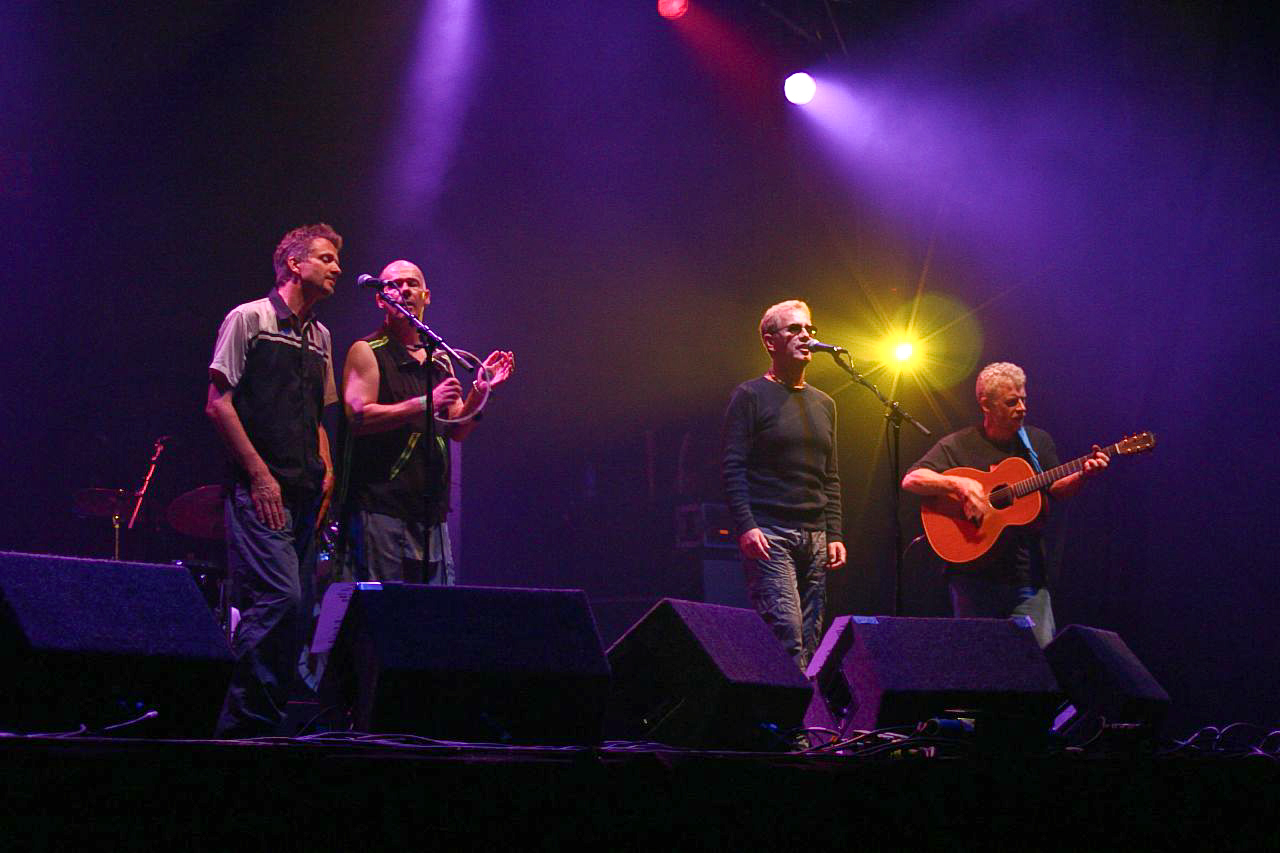
Folk-rock group Oysterband topped the chart in collaboration with June Tabor in 2011.

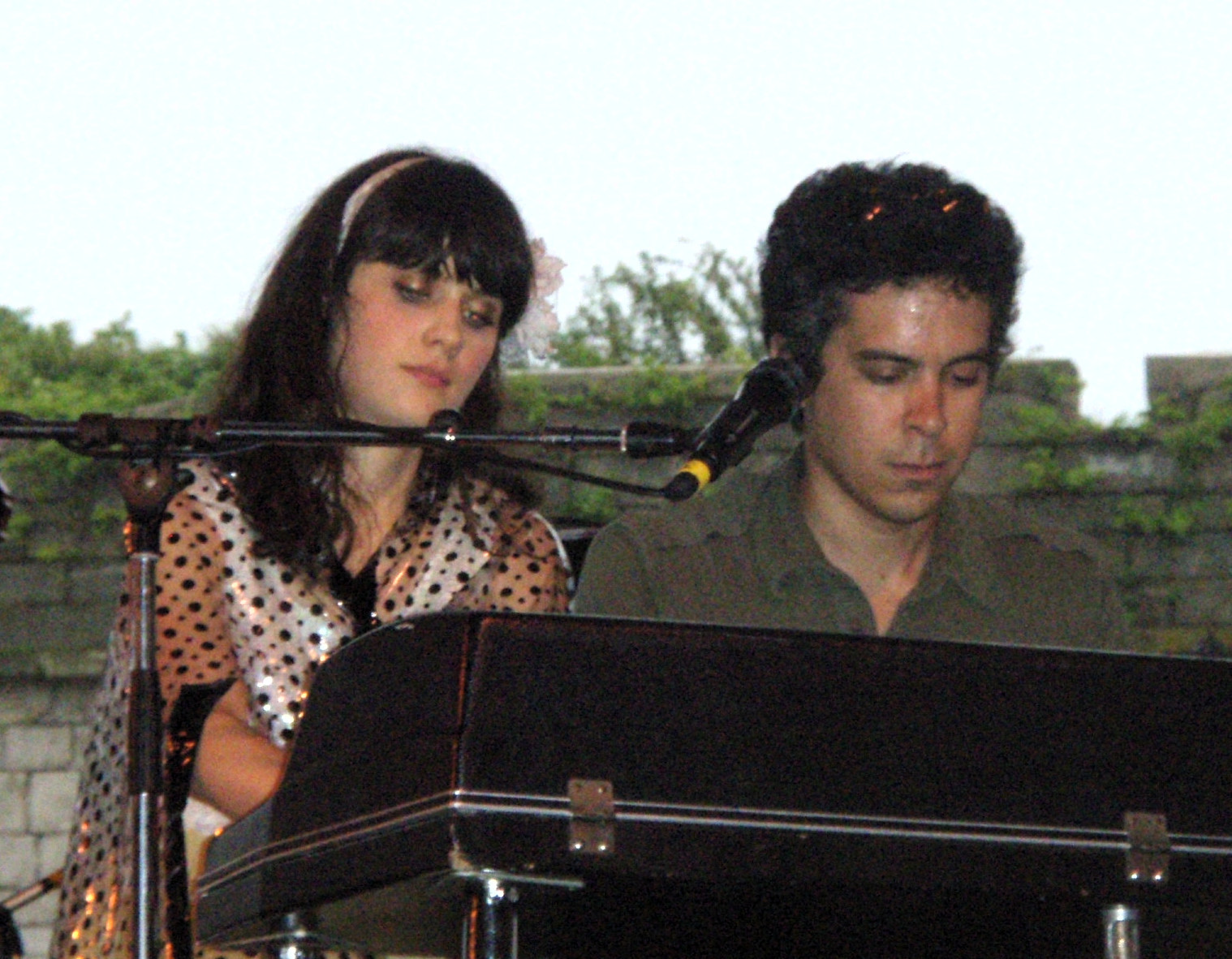
She & Him, comprising Zooey Deschanel and M. Ward, reached number one in both 2010 and 2011.

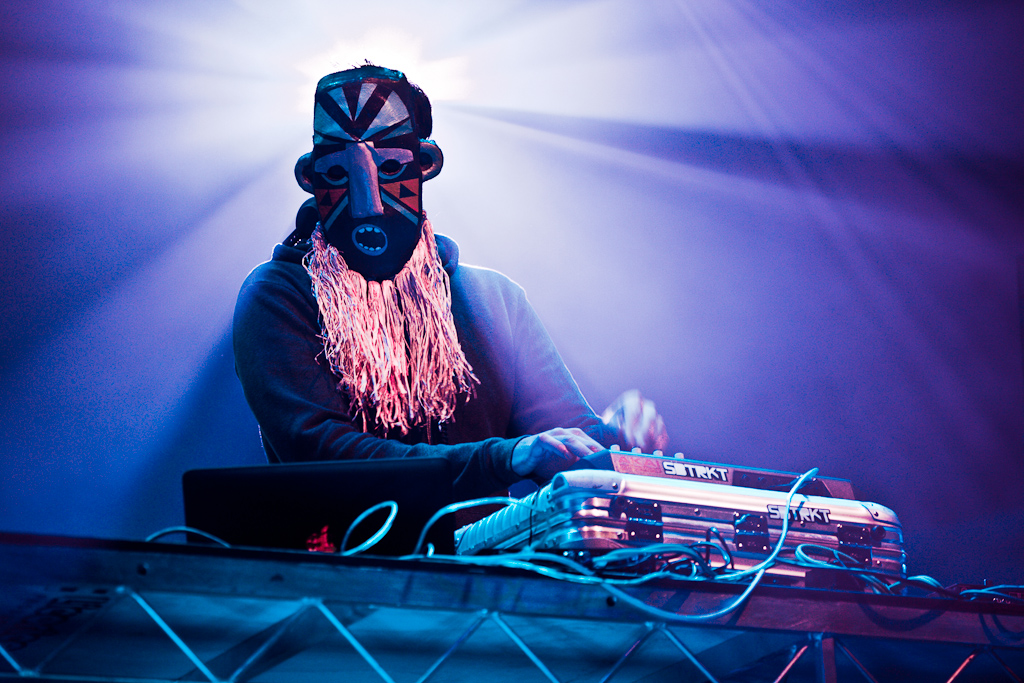
SBTRKT reached the top of the chart with his eponymously titled album.

Twenty five artists have spent three or more weeks at the top of the chart during the 2010s. The totals below include only credited performances.

Artist	Number-one albums	Weeks at number one
Future Islands	1	13
Christmas Hits Collective	1	9
Peppa Pig	1	8
Ryan Lewis	1	5
Macklemore	1	5
Walter Trout	4	4
PVRIS	1	4
Cara Dillon	3	4
Ron Sexsmith	2	4
The Civil Wars	1	4
Hillsong Worship	3	4
Warpaint	1	4
A Day to Remember	1	3
Edward Sharpe and the Magnetic Zeros	1	3
Grimes	1	3
SBTRKT	1	3
She & Him	3	3
Villagers	1	3
Charlotte Gainsborg	2	3
Gerry Cinnamon	1	3
Michael Stein	1	3
Kyle Dixon	1	3
Baxter Dury	1	3
The xx	1	3
Beach House	1	3

=== By record label ===
Thirty seven record labels have spent four or more weeks at the top of the chart during the 2010s.

Record label	Number-one albums	Weeks at number one
4AD	9	23
Nuclear Blast	23	23
Domino Records	15	17
Rough Trade	8	13
Bella Union	8	10
Lushgroove	1	9
Epitaph	9	9
Eone	1	8
Memphis Industries	7	8
Matador	7	8
Warp	7	8
Provogue	9	9
Young Turks	3	7
BMG	6	6
Sub Pop	4	5
Cooking Vinyl	3	5
Wall of Sound	2	5
Macklemore	1	5
Double Six Records	4	4
Hassle Records	5	5
Napalm	5	5
Topic	4	5
Rise	2	5
Sacred Bones	5	5
Transgressive	5	5
Sensibility	1	4
Hillsong	3	4
Hospital	4	4
Fearless	4	4
Peaceville	4	4
Charcoal	3	4
Jagjaguwar	4	4
PIAS	4	4
Infectious	4	4
Heavenly	4	4
Drag City	4	4
earMUSIC	4	4

== See also ==
- Lists of UK Independent Albums Chart number ones
