= Unfaithfully Yours =

Unfaithfully Yours may refer to:

- Unfaithfully Yours (1948 film), starring Rex Harrison and Linda Darnell
- Unfaithfully Yours (1984 film), starring Dudley Moore and Nastassja Kinski
- Unfaithfully Yours (album), a 2012 album by General Fiasco
