= Life Is Elsewhere (album) =

Life is Elsewhere

Studio album by Little Comets
- Released: 15 October 2012
- Genre: Indie rock; experimental pop
- Length: 43:09
- Label: Dirty Hit

Little Comets chronology
In Search of Elusive Little Comets (2011)	Life is Elsewhere (2012)	Hope Is Just a State of Mind (2015)

Singles from Life is Elsewhere
- 1. "Worry" Released: 12 December 2011; 2. "Jennifer" Released: 28 May 2012; 3. "A Little Opus" Released: 8 October 2012

Life is Elsewhere is the second studio album by Newcastle band Little Comets. The album was released on 15 October 2012. It includes the singles "Worry", "Jennifer" and "A Little Opus".

== Track listing ==
No.	Title	Length
1.	"A Little Opus"	3:47
2.	"Tense / Empty"	3:40
3.	"Jennifer"	2:42
4.	"Bayonne"	3:18
5.	"Waiting in the Shadows in the Dead of Night"	3:20
6.	"Violence Out Tonight"	4:47
7.	"The Western Boy"	3:42
8.	"Worry"	3:03
9.	"Semaphores on the Lawn"	3:12
10.	"W – O – E"	3:06
11.	"Woman Woman"	4:02
12.	"In Blue Music We Trust"	4:30

== Personnel ==
- Robert Coles – Lead Vocals & Guitar
- Michael Coles – Lead Guitar
- Matthew 'the cat' Hall – Bass
- Greenie – Drums
- George Daniel – Drums on track 3
