= Hope Is Just a State of Mind =

Studio album by Little Comets
- Released: 16 February 2015
- Genre: Indie rock
- Length: 41:05
- Label: The Smallest Label
- Producer: Michael Coles

Little Comets chronology
Life Is Elsewhere (2012)	Hope Is Just a State of Mind (2015)	Worhead (2017)

Singles from Hope Is Just a State of Mind

Hope Is Just a State of Mind is the third studio album by Newcastle band Little Comets. The album was released via The Smallest Label on 16 February 2015. It includes the singles "Little Italy", "Salt" and "Don't Fool Yourself".

== Track listing ==
No.	Title	Length
1.	"My Boy William"	4:07
2.	"B & B"	3:09
3.	"The Gift of Sound"	3:39
4.	"Formula"	3:12
5.	"Little Italy"	2:50
6.	"The Daily Grind"	3:26
7.	"Salt"	3:40
8.	"Effetism"	3:16
9.	"Wherewithal"	3:44
10.	"Fundamental Little Things"	3:30
11.	"Don't Fool Yourself"	3:10
12.	"The Blur, the Line & the Thickest of Onions"	3:22
Total length:		41:05

== Personnel ==
- Robert Coles - Lead Vocals & Guitar
- Michael Coles - Lead Guitar
- Matthew 'the cat' Hall - Bass

== Charts ==
Chart (2015)	Peak position
UK Albums Chart	31
