= Endless Rooms =

Studio album by Rolling Blackouts Coastal Fever
- Released: 6 May 2022
- Recorded: December 2020–February 2021
- Studio: The Basin
- Genres: Indie rock; jangle pop; college rock
- Length: 45:32
- Label: Sub Pop
- Producer: Matt Duffy

Rolling Blackouts Coastal Fever chronology
Sideways to New Italy (2020)	Endless Rooms (2022)

Singles from Endless Rooms
- 1. "The Way It Shatters" Released: 2 February 2022; 2. "Tidal River" Released: 2 March 2022; 3. "My Echo" Released: 5 April 2022; 4. "Dive Deep" Released: 4 May 2022

Endless Rooms is the third studio album by Australian indie rock band Rolling Blackouts Coastal Fever. It was released on 6 May 2022 under Sub Pop.

== Background and recording ==
Much of the album was initially written while the band was in quarantine during the COVID-19 pandemic in Australia and its associated lockdowns, which served as base for writing the record. Writing also occurred during the release of the 2020 album, Sideways to New Italy, which was released during the height of the pandemic. In an interview with Stereogum, lead singer Tom Russo said that "despite being so close to each other, we couldn't see each other or get together and practice. As a result, the songs on Endless Rooms are ones that follow a more logical structure, because they haven't had their limbs ripped off them and stuck back on other songs."

The band did songwriting throughout much of Summer 2020, and in December 2020, the band was able to begin recording the album, where they recorded it on a ranch about two hours north of Melbourne owned by extended family of brothers and bandmembers, Tom and Joe Russo, dubbed "The Basin". Recording wrapped up in early 2021, and was produced by Matt Duffy.

== Music and composition ==
In many critic reviews, the album has been described as a continuation of the band's jangle pop and indie rock sound, with some publications further describing it as college rock. Lee Hammond, writing for Narc Magazine described the album as "jangly slacker pop". Hannah Mylrea, writing for NME called the album a continuation of "the band's trademark jangly indie rock".

== Release and promotion ==
=== Singles ===
There were four singles that were released, each about one month apart, ahead of the album. The third track on the album, "The Way It Shatters", released on 2 February 2022 was the lead single off the album. "Tidal River", released exactly a month later, was the second single released, and the second track on the album. The third single, "My Echo" was released on 5 April 2022, while the final single before the album's release, "Dive Deep", was released on the eve of the album's release.

=== Music videos ===
The lead single, "The Way It Shatters" had its music video premier on the band's YouTube channel the day of the single release, 2 February 2022. The video features a man in a suit walking up from the beach to celebrate his birthday party, but is unenthusiastically observing and taking in the festivities around the party before retreating back to the ocean. The video was directed and edited by Nick Mckk and Mike Ridley, with Loni Thomson providing art direction. Actors Cecil Coleman, Shane O'Keefe, Lauren Heron, and Kgomotso Sekhu made appearances in the music video.

The single "Dive Deep" did not have a corresponding music video, but a video visualiser was released in conjunction with the single. It shows video of twilight over the horizon, with visualisations of the band members walking. The video was directed by Jamieson Moore.

== Critical reception ==
Professional ratings
Aggregate scores
Source	Rating
Metacritic	78/100
Review scores
Source	Rating
AllMusic	4/5 stars
Dork	3/5 stars
DIY	4/5 stars
Exclaim!	7/10
Loud and Quiet	6/10
Mojo	4/5 stars
NME	4/5 stars
Pitchfork	7.3/10
Uncut	4/5 stars
Under the Radar	7.5/10 stars

Endless Rooms was met with widespread acclaim from contemporary music critics. At Metacritic, which assigns a weighted average, Endless Rooms has a rating of 82 out of 100 to reviews from mainstream publications, based on eight critic reviews.

== Track listing ==
All tracks are written by Fran Keaney, Tom Russo, Joe White, Joe Russo, and Marcel Tussie.

No.	Title	Length
1.	"Pearl Like You"	1:03
2.	"Tidal River"	4:26
3.	"The Way It Shatters"	4:22
4.	"Caught Low"	3:54
5.	"My Echo"	3:35
6.	"Dive Deep"	5:13
7.	"Open Up Your Window"	2:07
8.	"Blue Eye Lake"	4:42
9.	"Saw You at the Eastern Beach"	3:52
10.	"Vanishing Dots"	3:41
11.	"Endless Rooms"	3:49
12.	"Bounce Off the Bottom"	4:43
Total length:		45:32

== Personnel ==
Credits are adapted from the album's liner notes.

Rolling Blackouts Coastal Fever

- Marcel Tussie – drums
- Fran Keaney – guitar, vocals, synthesiser
- Joe White – guitar, vocals, keyboards, percussion
- Tom Russo – guitar, vocals, keyboards
- Joe Russo – bass, synthesiser, drum machine

Additional musicians

- Stella Donelly – backing vocals (2, 4–6, 12)
- Hannah Welch – backing vocals (12)

Technical

- Rolling Blackouts Coastal Fever – production, sleeve design
- Matt Chow – production
- Scott Horscroft – mixing
- Nao Anzai – mastering
- Nick McKinlay – photography
- Joe Russo – sleeve design

== Charts ==
Chart performance for Endless Rooms
Chart (2022)	Peak position
Belgian Albums (Ultratop Flanders)	187
Scottish Albums (Official Charts)	11
UK Album Downloads (Official Charts)	39
UK Independent Albums (Official Charts)	6
