= Ever So Shy =

Single by General Fiasco

from the album Buildings
- Released: 14 March 2010
- Genre: Alternative
- Label: Infectious Records
- Producer(s): Neal Calderwood

General Fiasco singles chronology
"Ever So Shy" (2010)	"I'm Not Made of Eyes" (2010)

Ever So Shy is the second General Fiasco single to be released through Infectious Records, from the debut album, Buildings. It was released as an EP on 14 March as a digital download through iTunes, and was then also released as a single on 15 March. It reached no.77 on the UK Charts, it is General Fiasco's best-selling single to date.

It was featured in the end credits of Episode 5, Home Alone, from The Inbetweeners Series 3. The song also appeared during an episode of the TV show Jersey Shore, with emphasis on the lyrics, "let's get wasted, it's all we ever do".

== Music video ==
The video for the song was directed by Adam Neustadter and was shot in New York. The video was first released on YouTube for free streaming on 8 February 2010 and was later released on the EP.

== Track listing ==
All tracks are written by General Fiasco

No.	Title	Length
1.	"Ever So Shy"	3:27
2.	"Ever So Shy (Extended Mix)"	6:25

EP only tracks
No.	Title	Length
3.	"Ever So Shy (Rockdaworld mix)"	6:00
4.	"Ever So Shy (Music Video)"	3:26
