= Worhead =

Studio album by Little Comets
- Released: 10 March 2017
- Genre: Indie rock
- Length: 32:38
- Label: The Smallest Label
- Producer: Michael Coles

Little Comets chronology
Hope Is Just a State of Mind (2015)	Worhead (2017)	-

Singles from Worhead
- 1. "Common Things" Released: 25 January 2017; 2. "The Man Who Wrote Thriller" Released: 3 March 2017; 3. "Hunting" Released: 6 March 2017

Worhead is the fourth studio album by Newcastle band Little Comets. The album was released via The Smallest Label on 10 March 2017. It includes the singles "Common Things", "The Man Who Wrote Thriller" and "Hunting".

== Track listing ==
No.	Title	Length
1.	"Worhead"	2:29
2.	"The Man Who Wrote Thriller"	3:36
3.	"Common Things"	3:02
4.	"À Bientôt"	3:17
5.	"The Seven Ages of Men"	2:37
6.	"The Redeemer"	3:22
7.	"The Great Outdoors"	3:13
8.	"Louise"	2:09
9.	"Break Bread"	2:42
10.	"Hunting"	2:17
11.	"Same Lover"	3:49
Total length:		32:38

== Personnel ==
- Robert Coles - Lead Vocals & Guitar
- Michael Coles - Lead Guitar
- Matthew 'the cat' Hall - Bass

== Charts ==
Chart (2017)	Peak position
UK Albums Chart	83
