= General Fiasco =

Irish indie rock group

- Origin: Bellaghy, Northern Ireland
- Years active: 2007–2013; 2017–present
- Labels: Infectious Records (2009–2011); Liberation Music (2009–2011); Dirty Hit (2011–2013)
- Members: Andrew Hayes; Stephen Leacock; Enda Strathern; Owen Strathern
- Past members: Stuart Bell; Shane Davey
- Website: generalfiasco.co.uk

General Fiasco are an indie rock group from Bellaghy, Northern Ireland. Since their formation in 2006, they have toured with Little Comets, Fighting With Wire, The Wombats, One Night Only, The Pigeon Detectives, The Enemy, Jet and Kids in Glass Houses. They released their debut album Buildings on 22 March 2010 on Infectious Records and released their second album Unfaithfully Yours on 30 July 2012 on Dirty Hit.

== History ==
=== Touring and recording (2007–2010) ===
In 2007, Owen Strathern and Stephen Leacock had been playing with The Tides and had already released an album to much critical acclaim. Leacock and Strathern hadn't enjoyed the music being played in the band and so the pair decided to form General Fiasco as an outlet for the pop rock they had desired to write. Owen's brother was brought in to play guitar alongside Leacock, with Shane Davey on the drums. Davey later moved to America and Leacock filled in as a temporary drummer but was not replaced since. The band had straight away begun gigging and also toured as main support to Fighting With Wire. Despite only being together for a few months, the band were named no.6 in Across the Line's top 10 local acts of 2007. In between touring and gigs the band were constantly recording demos and also releasing studio EPs. A demo in the summer of 2008 landed them a spot on the BBC Introducing Stage at that year's Reading & Leeds festival. Their first single, "Rebel Get By," was released in November 2008 and their second single, "Something Sometime," became Zane Lowe's "Hottest Record in the World". In 2009 the band signed to Infectious Records. NME included them as one of "the ten hopes for the near future." Since then they have been part of the BBC Introducing line-up at the Electric Proms in October 2008. The band started to receive plays from Zane Lowe, Steve Lamacq, Colin Murray, Huw Stephens, John Kennedy, Rigsy on Across The Line, Jenny Huston and Sara Cox and was playlisted at Xfm. They were later invited to perform an acoustic set at Jo Whiley's prestigious Little Noise Sessions in 2008.

=== Buildings and new member (2010–2012) ===
Their debut album Buildings was released on 22 March 2010 to mixed reviews. The band played at SXSW in Texas. They were nominated for Best British Newcomer at the Kerrang awards. They played at T in the Park, Glastonbury, Reading & Leeds festivals, the Pinkpop and London Calling, and also supported Snow Patrol on their Homecoming Ward Park date on 5 June 2010. The band were nominated for a Kerrang Award for best British newcomer but lost to Rise to Remain. The band embarked on a tour of the UK and Ireland in October 2010, becoming a foursome with the addition of a new guitarist.

On 6 September it was announced that the band had departed from previous record label Infectious Records and signed to indie record label Dirty Hit. It was around this time that the band won "Best Song" for "The Age You Start Losing Friends" at the first-ever Northern Ireland Music Awards that took place at Ulster Hall, Belfast on 2 November 2011. The band released new EP Waves on 14 November 2011, having just completed a tour of Britain and Ireland to promote it the previous month. The Don't You Ever EP followed on 4 March 2012, after a short tour taking in Manchester, London and Brighton.

=== Unfaithfully Yours and split (2012–2013) ===
The band completed work on their second album, Unfaithfully Yours, on 22 March 2012 which had been exactly 2 years since the release of Buildings and announced it would be released on 30 July 2012, and a tour to coincide. They showcased some of the songs featured on the new album during their October 2011 and February 2012 tours and at several appearances at SXSW in March 2012, including the Northern Ireland showcase on Thursday 15 March 2012 and the Music from Ireland showcase as B.D. Riley's on Friday 16 March 2012.

On Wednesday 6 June 2012 General Fiasco headlined a free concert to celebrate the Olympic torch relay's stop that day in Belfast, after having passed through Northern Ireland and Dublin. On 20 June 2012 the band released the video for "Bad Habits", their next single due out the same day as new album Unfaithfully Yours (30 July 2012).

On 24 January 2013, General Fiasco cancelled their UK tour and announced they were to take an indefinite hiatus. They released a statement on their Facebook page "We are very sorry to announce that we must cancel the upcoming Jan/Feb tour. We have decided to put the band on hold while we take some time out after more than 6 years and hundreds of live shows."

During the hiatus, the band played a few gigs with Duke Special. They also played a small gig in Belfast.

== Discography ==
=== Albums ===
List of albums, with selected chart positions and certifications
Title	Album details	Peak chart positions		Certifications
Title	Album details	NZL	UK	Certifications
Buildings	Released: 22 March 2010; Label: Infectious Records; Formats: CD, digital download	37	77	
Unfaithfully Yours	Released: 30 July 2012; Label: Dirty Hit; Formats: CD, digital download	—	—	
"—" denotes a title that did not chart, or was not released in that territory.

=== Singles ===
List of singles, with selected chart positions, showing year released and album name
Title	Year	Peak chart positions			Album
Title	Year	UK	UK Indie	NZ	Album
"Rebel Get By"	2008	—	—	—	Buildings
"Something Sometime"	2009	—	2	—	Buildings
"We Are the Foolish"	2009	176	—	39	Buildings
"Ever So Shy"	2010	87	5	14	Buildings
"I'm Not Made of Eyes"	2010	—	—	—	Buildings
"The Age That You Start Losing Friends"	2011	—	—	—	Unfaithfully Yours
"Waves"	2011	—	—	—	Unfaithfully Yours
"Don't You Ever"	2012	—	—	—	Unfaithfully Yours
"Bad Habits"	2012	—	—	—	Unfaithfully Yours
"—" denotes a title that did not chart, or was not released in that territory.

=== EPs ===
- iTunes Live: London Festival '09
- Ever So Shy
- Waves
- Don't You Ever

== Awards and nominations ==
Awards and nominations for General Fiasco
Year	Nominee / work	Award	Result
2010	General Fiasco	Kerrang! Award for Best British Newcomer	Nominated
2011	The Age That You Start Losing Friends	NIMA for Best Song	Won

== Members ==
- Owen Strathern – bass and lead vocals
- Enda Strathern – guitar and backing vocals
- Andrew Hayes – guitar and backing vocals
- Stephen "Leaky" Leacock – drums and percussion

Former

- Shane Davey – drums and percussion
- Stuart Bell – guitar, keyboards and percussion
