= Sideways to New Italy =

Studio album by Rolling Blackouts Coastal Fever
- Released: 5 June 2020
- Genres: Indie rock, jangle pop, surf rock
- Length: 39:43
- Label: Sub Pop

Rolling Blackouts Coastal Fever chronology
Hope Downs (2018)	Sideways to New Italy (2020)	Endless Rooms (2022)

Singles from Sideways to New Italy
- 1. "Cars in Space" Released: 12 February 2020; 2. "She's There" Released: 31 March 2020; 3. "Falling Thunder" Released: 5 May 2020; 4. "Cameo" Released: 3 June 2020

Sideways to New Italy is the second album by the Australian indie rock band Rolling Blackouts Coastal Fever. It was released on 5 June 2020 under Sub Pop.

== Critical reception ==
Professional ratings
Aggregate scores
Source	Rating
AnyDecentMusic?	7.7/10
Metacritic	80/100
Review scores
Source	Rating
AllMusic	4/5 stars
Beats Per Minute	81%
Clash	7/10
Exclaim!	7/10
Loud and Quiet	7/10
NME	4/5 stars
Paste	8.6/10
Pitchfork	6.6/10
Rolling Stone	4/5 stars
Tom Hull	B+

Sideways to New Italy was met with universal acclaim through critics' reviews. At Metacritic, which assigns a weighted average rating out of 100 to reviews from mainstream publications, this release received an average score of 80, based on 17 reviews.

=== Accolades ===
Accolades for Sideways to New Italy
Publication	Accolade	Rank	Ref.
The Music	The Music's Top 10 Albums of 2020	8	
Rough Trade	Rough Trade's Albums of The Year 2020	8	
Double J	Double J's 50 Best Albums of 2020	10	
Under the Radar	Under the Radar's Top 100 Albums of 2020	34	
Stereogum	Stereogum's 50 Best Albums of 2020 – Mid-Year	16	

== Track listing ==
Sideways to New Italy track listing
No.	Title	Length
1.	"The Second of the First"	3:40
2.	"Falling Thunder"	4:05
3.	"She's There"	3:44
4.	"Beautiful Steven"	3:48
5.	"The Only One"	3:46
6.	"Cars in Space"	4:58
7.	"Cameo"	4:07
8.	"Not Tonight"	4:00
9.	"Sunglasses at the Wedding"	3:32
10.	"The Cool Change"	4:03
Total length:		39:42

== Charts ==
Chart performance for Sideways to New Italy
Chart (2020)	Peak position
Australian Albums (ARIA)	4
Belgian Albums (Ultratop Flanders)	64
Dutch Albums (Album Top 100)	66
Irish Albums (IRMA)	77
Scottish Albums (Official Charts)	8
UK Albums (Official Charts)	45
UK Independent Albums (Official Charts)	1
