= Rolling Blackouts Coastal Fever =

Australian indie rock band

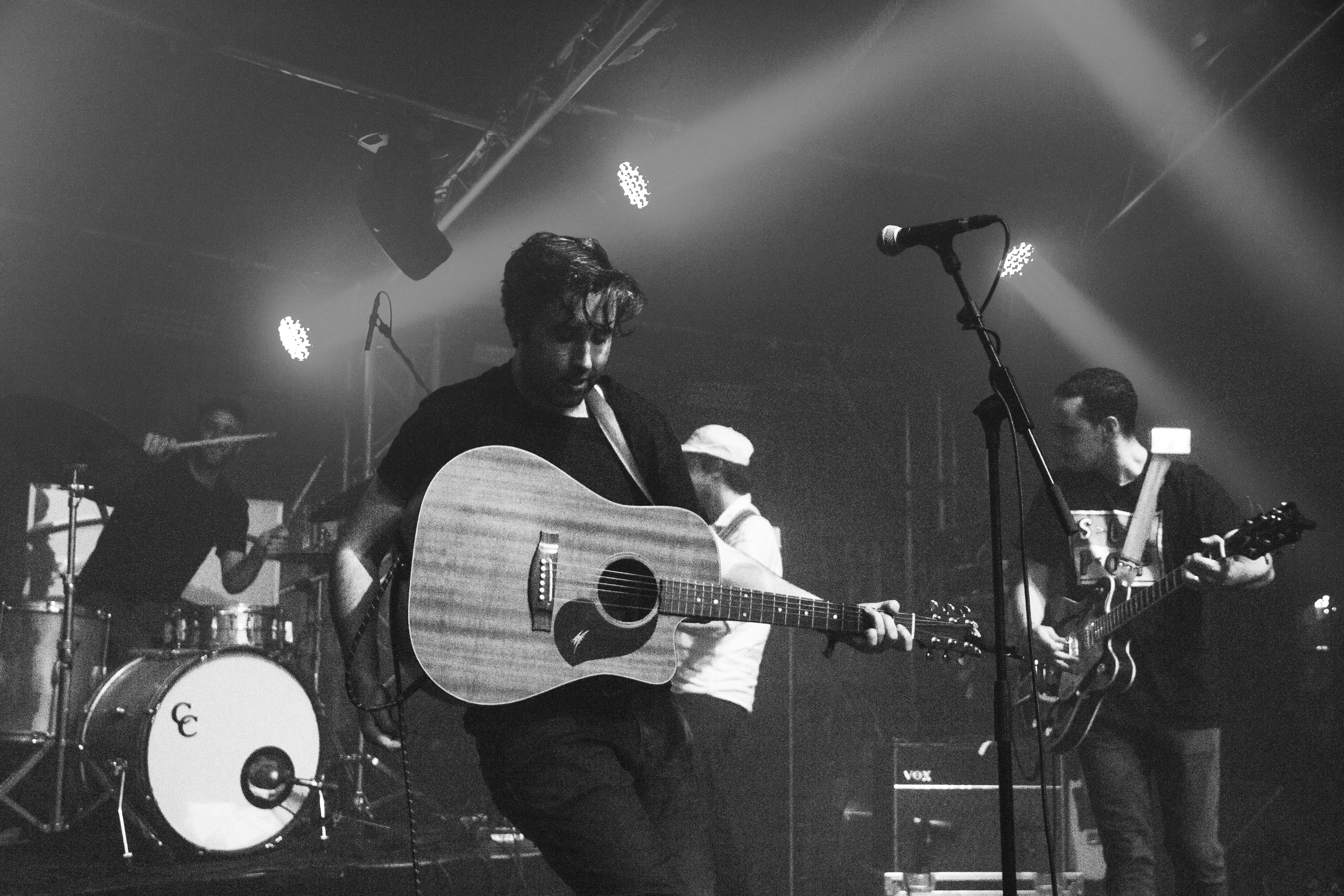
- Rolling Blackouts Coastal Fever in 2018

Background information
- Also known as: Rolling Blackouts C.F.
- Origin: Melbourne, Australia
- Genres: Indie rock; jangle pop; post-punk revival; surf rock
- Years active: 2013–present
- Labels: Ivy League, Sub Pop
- Members: Fran Keaney; Tom Russo; Joe White; Joe Russo; Marcel Tussie
- Website: www.rollingblackoutsband.com

Rolling Blackouts Coastal Fever, also sometimes known as Rolling Blackouts C.F., is an Australian indie rock band, formed in Melbourne in 2013. The band consists of three lead vocalists and guitarists — Fran Keaney, Tom Russo, and Joe White — alongside bassist Joe Russo and drummer Marcel Tussie.

Rising to prominence following the release of their second EP, The French Press, in 2017, the band has released three studio albums: Hope Downs (2018), Sideways to New Italy (2020) and Endless Rooms (2022).

== History ==
Rolling Blackouts Coastal Fever was formed in Melbourne, Australia, in 2013 by three guitarists; cousins Fran Keaney and Joe White, along with their longtime friend and musical partner Tom Russo. Soon after, the band recruited Tom Russo's brother Joe Russo on bass guitar, as well as Fran Keaney's housemate Marcel Tussie on drums. Their debut EP, Talk Tight, was released in 2016 on Ivy League Records. It was followed by their second EP, The French Press, which was mixed by Doug Boehm and released in 2017 on Sub Pop. They performed at the St Jerome's Laneway Festival on 29 January 2018, and their debut full-length album, Hope Downs, was released on 15 June 2018 on Sub Pop. Their second album, Sideways to New Italy, was released in 2020, again on Sub Pop. Sideways' was met with critical acclaim, and was named as one of the top albums of 2020 by several music publications including Under the Radar, Rough Trade, and Double J.

The group followed up their 2020 effort in 2022 with their third studio album, Endless Rooms, which was written during the COVID-19 pandemic in Australia while the band was in quarantine. During the process, the band described how quarantine made the songwriting process difficult. In 2022 interview with Stereogum, lead singer Tom Russo said that "despite being so close to each other, we couldn't see each other or get together and practice. As a result, the songs on Endless Rooms are ones that follow a more logical structure, because they haven't had their limbs ripped off them and stuck back on other songs." Despite these challenges, the band did songwriting throughout much of Summer 2020, and in December 2020, the band was able to begin recording the album, where they recorded it on a ranch about two hours north of Melbourne owned by extended family of brothers and bandmembers, dubbed "The Basin". Endless Rooms was met with positive critical reviews.

After touring for much of 2022 and 2023, the band was rather inactive throughout 2024 and 2025. In 2026, the band released their first song in four years, "Sunburned In London". With the release, the band teased a potential fourth studio album.

== Reception ==
Robert Christgau gave Talk Tight an A grade, writing that "If you like the [guitar] effect—and why not, it's beautiful—you'll gravitate to it on sound alone. But what I'm loving at least as much is lyrics that suit the bright white male culture the sound implies." He also compared the band's sound to that of the Go-Betweens, a comparison that has also been made by critics like Stephen Deusner. The band has also been aligned with Melbourne's dolewave scene.

According to Metacritic, The French Press has a score of 81 out of 100, based on 4 reviews, indicating that it has received "universal acclaim" from critics. One favorable review of the EP was written by Pitchfork Media's Stuart Berman, who gave it an 8.1/10 rating, writing that The French Press "shines just as bright as their last EP [Talk Tight], but the songs cast darker shadows." In a more mixed review, Landon MacDonald of PopMatters gave the EP a 5 out of 10 rating, writing that "Ultimately, this record is for indie rock fans alone and can't stretch past the borders of the genre." Hope Downs has an 84/100 on Metacritic.

== Members ==
- Fran Keaney – vocals, acoustic guitar (2013–present)
- Tom Russo – vocals, guitar (2013–present)
- Joe White – vocals, lead guitar, keyboards, harmonica (2013–present)
- Marcel Tussie - drums, percussion (2013–present)
- Joe Russo – bass guitar (2013–present)

== Discography ==
=== Studio albums ===
List of studio albums, with selected chart positions
Title	Album details	Peak chart positions							
Title	Album details	AUS	BEL (FL)	IRE	NLD	SCO	UK	UK Ind.	US Heat
Hope Downs	Released: 15 June 2018; Label: Ivy League, Sub Pop	24	198	—	79	20	45	5	3
Sideways to New Italy	Released: 5 June 2020; Label: Ivy League, Sub Pop	4	64	77	66	8	45	1	—
Endless Rooms	Released: 6 May 2022; Label: Ivy League, Sub Pop	— (Note: "Endless Rooms" did not enter the ARIA Top 100 Albums Chart, but peaked at number 18 on the ARIA Top 20 Vinyl Albums Chart.)	187	—	—	11	— (Note: "Endless Rooms" did not enter the UK Albums Chart, but peaked at number 39 on the UK Album Downloads Chart Top 100.)	6	—
"—" denotes a recording that did not chart or was not released in that territory.

=== EPs ===
Title	EP details	Peak chart positions		
Title	EP details	AUS Hit.	UK Rec.	UK Ind.
Talk Tight	Released: 25 November 2016; Label: Ivy League	18	14	—
The French Press	Released: 10 March 2017; Label: Ivy League, Sub Pop	—	31	33
Live At KEXP	Released: 13 November 2018; Label: Sub Pop	—	13	—
"—" denotes a recording that did not chart or was not released in that territory.

=== Charted or certified singles ===
List of charted or certified singles, with selected details
Title	Year	Chart positions			Certification	Album
Title	Year	ICE	MEX Air.	UK Sales	Certification	Album
"Julie's Place"	2016	—	39	—		The French Press
"French Press"	2017	—	—	—	ARIA: Gold	The French Press
"Talking Straight"	2018	—	48	—		Hope Downs
"In The Capital"	2019	—	—	4		Non-album single
"She's There"	2020	40	—	—		Sideways to New Italy
"—" denotes a recording that did not chart or was not released in that territory.

== Awards and nominations ==
=== AIR Awards ===
The Australian Independent Record Awards (commonly known informally as AIR Awards) is an annual awards night to recognise, promote and celebrate the success of Australia's Independent Music sector.

Year	Nominee / work	Award	Result
2019	Hope Downs	Best Independent Album	Nominated

=== Australian Music Prize ===
The Australian Music Prize (the AMP) is an annual award of $30,000 given to an Australian band or solo artist in recognition of the merit of an album released during the year of award.

Year	Nominee / work	Award	Result
2018	Hope Downs	Australian Music Prize	Nominated

=== J Award ===
The J Awards are an annual series of Australian music awards that were established by the Australian Broadcasting Corporation's youth-focused radio station Triple J.

Year	Nominee / work	Award	Result
2018	themselves	Double J Artist of the Year	Nominated
2020	themselves	Double J Artist of the Year	Nominated

=== Music Victoria Awards ===
The Music Victoria Awards, are an annual awards night celebrating Victorian music. They commenced in 2005.

Year	Nominee / work	Award	Result	Ref.
2018	Hope Downs	Best Album	Nominated	
2018	Rolling Blackouts Coastal Fever	Best Band	Nominated	
2020	Sideways to New Italy	Best Album	Nominated	
2020	themselves	Best Band	Nominated	
2022	Rolling Blackouts Coastal Fever	Best Rock/Punk Work	Nominated	

=== National Live Music Awards ===
The National Live Music Awards (NLMAs) are a broad recognition of Australia's diverse live industry, celebrating the success of the Australian live scene.

Year	Nominee / work	Award	Result
2020	Joe Russo (Rolling Blackouts Coastal Fever)	Live Bassist of the Year	Nominated
