= Wanderer (Cara Dillon album) =

Studio album by Cara Dillon
- Released: 13 October 2017
- Recorded: 2017
- Studio: Random Sound and Cooper Hall Somerset, UK
- Genre: Folk, Celtic, Irish traditional
- Length: 43:45
- Label: Charcoal Records
- Producer: Sam Lakeman

Cara Dillon chronology
Upon a Winter's Night (2016)	Wanderer (2017)

Singles from Wanderer
- 1. "Blackwater Side" Released: 22 September 2017; 2. "Dubhdara" Released: 6 October 2017

Professional ratings
Review scores
Source	Rating
The Guardian	4/5 stars

Wanderer is the seventh studio album by Irish folk singer Cara Dillon. It was released on 13 October 2017 on Charcoal Records.

== Background ==
Dillon announced the album on her website and social media on 13 September 2017 by revealing the title and artwork. In an interview with the Belfast Live, she explained that she had not planned to release an album in 2017, but a period of spontaneous recording in the summer resulted in an album taking shape.

The album was recorded at Random Sound and Cooper Hall, Somerset, and predominantly features piano and acoustic guitar accompaniment by Sam Lakeman, with guest musical contributions by Justin Adams, Kris Drever, Niall Murphy, Ben Nicholls and John Smith.

The album features seven traditional ballads, two original songs and a cover version of Shaun Davey’s "Dubhdarra". Both of the album's original songs explore the theme of emigration – historically, and in the present day – as do many of the traditional songs included.

Speaking about the inspiration for the album in a statement released by Folk Radio UK, Dillon discussed the album's main themes of departure and longing for home, saying:

Having lived outside of Ireland for most of my adult life, I continue to identify with these songs of departure and longing for home on a very personal level. Several of the songs refer to places close to where I grew up, making them particularly emotional to sing. It feels like a gift to be able to share these stories as they continue to move and inspire a new generation of people.

In a Belfast Telegraph interview, Dillon said that she views it as a very different album to her previous releases, saying:

It's very stripped back and simple and I think it sounds a bit more mature than everything else I've ever recorded - almost like we've grown up.

== Release and critical reception ==
The album entered the Independent Album Breakers Chart at No.1, and entered the UK Official Album Chart at No. 89.

It was well received by critics upon release. The Guardian's Neil Spencer described the album with the headline "gorgeous homesick blues" and awarded the album four stars. Folking.com called the album Dillon's "most reflective and most musically introspective album to date" and The Irish Echo noted a difference in tone between the album and its predecessors, saying it had "a subdued, simpler sound – one that also allows for a wider emotional range in her vocals."

== Track listing ==
Wanderer
No.	Title	Writer(s)	Length
1.	"The Tern and the Swallow"	Trad. Arr.; Cara Dillon; Sam Lakeman	4:00
2.	"Blackwater Side"	Trad. Arr.; Dillon; Lakeman	4:10
3.	"The Leaving Song"	Dillon; Lakeman	3:22
4.	"The Banks of the Foyle"	Trad. Arr.; Dillon; Lakeman	5:40
5.	"Both Sides the Tweed"	Traditional; Dick Gaughan	3:49
6.	"Sailor Boy"	Trad. Arr.; Dillon; Lakeman	3:46
7.	"The Faughan Side"	Trad. Arr.; Dillon; Lakeman	5:12
8.	"The Banks of the Bann"	Trad. Arr.; Dillon; Lakeman	3:31
9.	"Lakeside Swans"	Dillon; Lakeman	4:56
10.	"Dubhdara"	Shaun Davey	5:21
Total length:			43:45

== Personnel ==
Musicians

- Justin Adams – electric guitar
- Cara Dillon – vocals
- Sam Lakeman – producer, piano, acoustic guitar, organ
- Niall Murphy – fiddle
- Ben Nicholls – bass, double bass
- John Smith – acoustic guitar, backing vocals

Production

- Matt Austin – photography
- Mike 'Spike' Drake – mixing
- Sam Lakeman – recording, production, mixing
- Tim Young – mastering
- Florian Zumfelde – art design and layout
