= Roxanne Tataei =

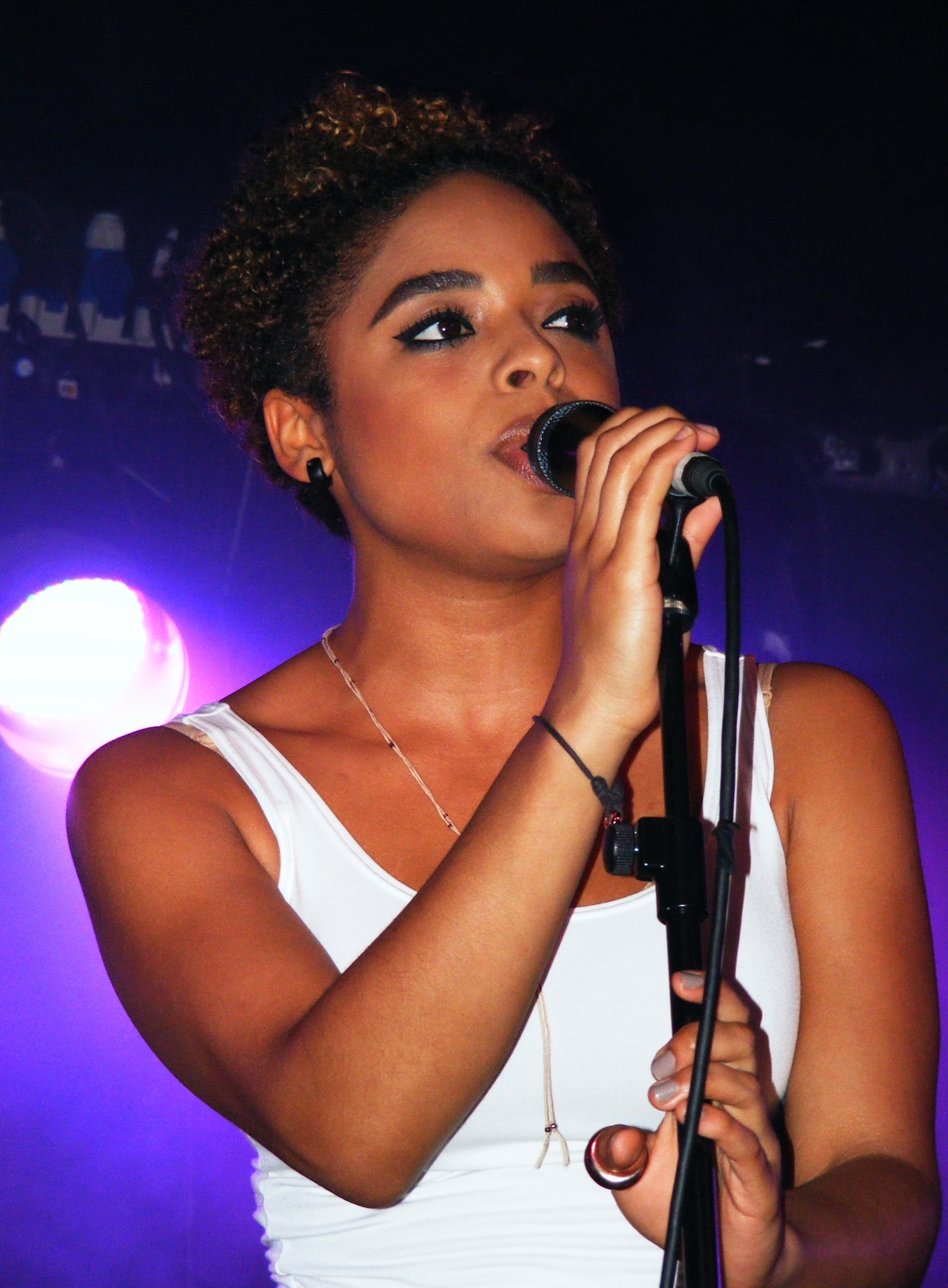
- Rox at the Dot to Dot Festival, Manchester, 2010.

Background information
- Also known as: Rox
- Born: Roxanne Tataei; March 23, 1988 (age 38); Norbury, London, England
- Genres: Soul; R&B; reggae
- Occupations: Singer-songwriter; guitarist
- Instruments: Vocals; guitar; keyboards
- Years active: 2007–present
- Labels: TATA; Rough Trade
- Website: www.roxannetataei.com

Roxanne Tataei, also known by the stage name Rox, is an English singer-songwriter from South London.

== Early life ==
Born and raised in Norbury, London, England Roxanne Tataei's heritage is half-Jamaican (mother) and half-Iranian (father). She cites living with her grandparents and being a regular churchgoer as her introduction to singing.

By age 10, Tataei was a part of the National Youth Music Theatre and traveled across Britain, appearing in various productions with them. By her 14th birthday, she had her first guitar and was experimenting with several musical genres. She rehearsed her music at Scream Studios in Croydon.

Tataei's musical influences include Lauryn Hill, Joni Mitchell, Sade, Mary J. Blige and Alanis Morissette.

== Music career ==
After forming her first band in 2007, Tataei attracted interest from various labels before signing with Rough Trade in November 2008. Since signing, she has appeared on tours with the likes of Mark Ronson and Daniel Merriweather and on such television shows as Later... with Jools Holland (Series 35).

Tataei's debut single, "No Going Back", was released on seven-inch vinyl on 15 December 2009. She told Steve Lamacq on his Radio 2 show that the song is about "leaving a relationship and not wanting to go back to that situation."

Tataei's next single, "My Baby Left Me", was released on 15 March 2010 and made the BBC Radio 2 A-List and has received other critical success. She entered the Dutch Top 40 on 17 April 2010 at Number 35, moving to a new peak of 27 a week later.

Tataei released her debut album, Memoirs, on 7 June 2010, which features the previously released singles and 10 other tracks. The album was partially recorded in New Jersey in April 2009 with "Commissioner" Gordon Williams, but mainly in London with Jay-Z and Lupe Fiasco producer Al Shux.

Her third single, "I Don't Believe", was released simultaneously as her album. Tataei posted the music video on her official Twitter on 4 May 2010. It was also used in an advertising campaign by Rimmel.

Her fourth single, "Rocksteady", was also included as soundtrack EA Sports game, 2010 FIFA World Cup South Africa.

Tataei's single 'My Baby Left Me' has been used in the 2013 movie Girl Most Likely as background music for the 'sex scene' between Kristen Wiig and Darren Criss.

== Reviews ==
Roxanne Tataei was tipped for success in 2010, being selected as HMV's "Next Big Thing" and in February played a headlining performance at London's Jazz Café on the "Next Big Thing Night".

Tataei was featured as The Guardian's "New Band of the Day" on 23 November 2009. She also made the longlist of the BBC's Sound of 2010. As well as MTV UK's "10 for 10" list.

Mike Driver, writing for the BBC about her debut album, was effusive about the singer but complained about the inconsistency of the album overall, saying that it "showcases a young singer bursting with potential" but that "like many a debut, Memoirs doesn't know quite where to settle style-wise, veering from excellence to excruciation. Heart Ran Dry retains the acoustic element of the preceding Forever Always Wishing. Still, it is a more sketchy X Factor audition than a track worthy of making any album's final cut.".

== Discography ==
=== As Rox ===
Studio albums

Year	Album details	Peak chart positions			
Year	Album details	UK	NL	FRA	ITA
2010	Memoirs: Released: 7 June 2010; Formats: CD, download	97	37	76	11

Singles

Year	Single	Peak chart positions				Album
Year	Single	UK	NL	GER	ITA	Album
2009	"No Going Back"	—	—	—	—	Memoirs
2010	"My Baby Left Me"	91	12	35	11	Memoirs
2010	"I Don't Believe"	—	—	—	— (Note: "I Don't Believe" reached number four on EarOne's Italian airplay chart.)	Memoirs
2010	"Rocksteady"	—	—	—	—	Memoirs

=== As Roxanne Tataei ===
Studio albums

Year	Album details	Peak chart positions			
Year	Album details	UK	NL	FRA	ITA
2018	Full Moon in Aries: Released: 24 September 2018; Formats: CD, download	—	—	—	—

EPs

Year	Album details	Peak chart positions			
Year	Album details	UK	NL	FRA	ITA
2015	Grey Area: Released: 27 November 2015; Formats: Download	—	—	—	—

Singles

Year	Single	Peak chart positions				Album
Year	Single	UK	NL	GER	ITA	Album
2015	"My Weakness"	—	—	—	—	Grey Area
2018	"Crimson Eyes"	—	—	—	—	Full Moon in Aries
