= United Pursuit =

American contemporary worship music band

- Also known as: United Pursuit Band
- Origin: Knoxville, Tennessee
- Genres: Worship, folk rock, indie folk, indie rock
- Years active: 2006–present
- Members: Will Reagan; Brock Human; Nathan Fray; Brandon Hampton; Andrea Marie Reagan; Michael Ketterer; Jake LeBoeuf; John Romero; Yoosung Lee
- Website: unitedpursuit.com

United Pursuit (also known as United Pursuit Band) is an American contemporary worship music band founded in 2006 from Knoxville, Tennessee. They have released three live albums, EP in 2008, Radiance in 2009, and Simple Gospel in 2015. The 2015 album was their breakthrough release upon the Billboard charts. According to their website, you could say they're 'a band, collective, or whatever, but the point is we're friends who love worshipping our Creator together. Family feels like a better word'.

== Background ==
The band has its origins in a 2006 house purchase in the 5th Avenue section of downtown Knoxville, Tennessee, where they hoped to attract believers and people for Jesus Christ. They started with the indie folk rock worship music back in 2008. Their members are Michael Ketterer, Will Reagan, Brock Human, Nathan Fray, Jake LeBoeuf, Brandon Hampton, Andrea Marie Reagan, John Romero, and Yoosung Lee.

== Music history ==
The band started music recording in 2008, with their first live album, EP, that was released on May 31, 2008, from United Pursuit Records. Their subsequent live album, Radiance, was released on March 31, 2009, by United Pursuit Records. They released, Simple Gospel, on August 14, 2015, with United Pursuit Records. This album would be the breakthrough released upon the Billboard magazine charts, where it peaked at No. 85 on The Billboard 200, No. 2 on Christian Albums, and No. 6 on Independent Albums. This album was No. 13. on the Worship Leader's Top 20 Albums of 2015 list.

== Members ==
Current members

- Will Reagan – vocals, acoustic guitar, keys
- Brock Human – vocals, acoustic guitar
- Brandon Hampton – vocals, electric guitar
- Andrea Marie Reagan – vocals, piano
- Michael Ketterer – vocals
- Jake LeBoeuf – vocals
- John Romero – bass
- Yoosung Lee – cello
- Nathan Fray – drums

== Discography ==
=== Studio albums ===
List of albums, with selected chart positions
Title	Album details	Peak chart positions
Title	Album details	UK C&G
Garden	Released: June 22, 2018; Label: United Pursuit Records; Formats: CD, digital download, streaming	6
What Could We Become?	Released: August 25, 2023; Label: United Pursuit Records; Formats: Digital download, streaming	—

=== Live albums ===
List of albums, with selected chart positions
Title	Album details	Peak chart positions					
Title	Album details	UK	US	UK C&G	UK Indie	US Christ.	US Indie
EP	Released: May 31, 2008; Label: United Pursuit Records; Formats: Digital download, streaming	—	—	—	—	—	—
Radiance	Released: March 31, 2009; Label: United Pursuit Records; Formats: CD, digital download, streaming	—	—	—	—	—	—
Simple Gospel	Released: August 14, 2015; Label: United Pursuit Records; Formats: CD, digital download, streaming	83	85	1	13	2	6
Simple Gospel B-Sides	Released: December 23, 2016; Label: United Pursuit Records; Formats: Digital download, streaming	—	—	—	—	—	—
Garden (Live)	Released: November 30, 2018; Label: United Pursuit Records; Formats: CD, digital download, streaming	—	—	—	—	—	—
Live at Red Rocks, Vol. 1	Released: April 5, 2019; Label: Watershed; Formats: Digital download, streaming	—	—	—	—	—	—

=== EPs ===
List of EPs, with selected chart positions
Title	EP details	Peak chart positions
Title	EP details	UK C&G
Found	Released: 2011; Label: United Pursuit Records; Formats: CD, digital download, streaming	—
Looking for a Savior	Released: August 26, 2016; Label: United Pursuit Records; Formats: CD, digital download, streaming	8

=== United Pursuit & Will Reagan ===
List of releases with select chart positions
Title	EP details	Peak chart positions
Title	EP details	US Christ.
In the Night Season	Released: August 6, 2009; Label: United Pursuit Records; Formats: Digital download, streaming	—
Live at the Banks House	Released: November 11, 2010; Label: United Pursuit Records; Formats: CD, digital download, streaming	32
Endless Years	Released: December 4, 2012; Label: United Pursuit Records; Formats: CD, digital download, streaming	15
Tell All My Friends	Released: January 17, 2017; Label: United Pursuit Records; Formats: CD, digital download, streaming	—
Live in Baltimore	Released: March 2, 2018; Label: United Pursuit Records; Formats: Digital download, streaming	—

=== Solo projects ===
Andrea Marie

- Here Begin (December 10, 2011)
- Low (March 1, 2016)
- Fractures of a Person (October 11, 2024)

Brock Human

- Color Of Red (November 8, 2011)

Michael Ketterer

- Love/War/Solar System (July 26, 2011)
- The Wild Inside (February 11, 2014)
- 40. (August 15, 2017)

Will Reagan

- Vacancy (August 2, 2019)
- I Love It When You Smile (June 27, 2025)
