= That's Your Lot =

Studio album by Blaenavon
- Released: 7 April 2017
- Recorded: 2016
- Genre: Indie rock; folk rock
- Length: 57:38
- Label: Atlantic; Canvasback

Blaenavon chronology
Prague '99 (2017)	That's Your Lot (2017)	Everything That Makes You Happy (2019)

Singles from That's Your Lot

Professional ratings
Aggregate scores
Source	Rating
Metacritic	80/100
Review scores
Source	Rating
DIY	5/5 stars
Line of Best Fit	4/5 stars
NME	3/5 stars
Q	4/5 stars

That's Your Lot is the debut studio album by English rock band, Blaenavon. The album was released through Atlantic Records on 7 April 2017.

== Track listing ==
No.	Title	Length
1.	"Take Care"	4:49
2.	"Let's Pray"	3:35
3.	"Orthodox Man"	3:50
4.	"My Bark Is Your Bite"	3:36
5.	"Lonely Side"	3:50
6.	"Let Me See What Happens Next"	2:17
7.	"Alice Come Home"	6:28
8.	"Ode To Joe"	6:11
9.	"I Will Be The World"	4:31
10.	"Prague '99"	5:39
11.	"Swans"	7:56
12.	"That's Your Lot"	4:56
Total length:		57:38

== Charts ==
Chart (2017)	Peak position
UK Albums (OCC)	54
