= Hope Downs =

Studio album by Rolling Blackouts Coastal Fever

Studio album by Rolling Blackouts Coastal Fever
- Released: June 15, 2018
- Genres: Indie rock, jangle rock
- Length: 35:17
- Label: Sub Pop

Rolling Blackouts Coastal Fever chronology
The French Press (2017)	Hope Downs (2018)	Sideways to New Italy (2020)

Hope Downs is the debut studio album by the Australian indie rock band Rolling Blackouts Coastal Fever. It was released on 15 June 2018, through Sub Pop, which peaked at No. 24 on the ARIA Albums Chart. The title refers to the Hope Downs mine, which, according to the band, "refers to the feeling of standing at the edge of the void of the big unknown, and finding something to hold on to". The songs in the album generally have a theme of being alone. Critic Andy Cush says the album presents serene environments, calling it a "brief vacation".

== Reception ==
Professional ratings
Aggregate scores
Source	Rating
AnyDecentMusic?	7.8/10
Metacritic	84/100
Review scores
Source	Rating
AllMusic	4.5/5 stars
The A.V. Club	A−
The Independent	3/5 stars
The Irish Times	4/5 stars
Mojo	4/5 stars
Pitchfork	8.1/10
Q	4/5 stars
Rolling Stone	4/5 stars
Uncut	9/10
Vice	B+

Hope Downs received universal acclaim in reviews from critics. Juan Edgardo Rodriguez of No Ripcord and Simon Vozick-Levinson of Rolling Stone praised the high quality of all of the songs. Critic Adam Turner-Heffer of Under the Radar wrote "perhaps the only disappointment here is that their sound doesn't feel particularly expanded upon in the long-player format". Despite this, Turner-Heffer considers Hope Downs an impressive debut album.

== Track list ==
No.	Title	Length
1.	"An Air Conditioned Man"	4:51
2.	"Talking Straight"	3:44
3.	"Mainland"	4:14
4.	"Time in Common"	2:04
5.	"Sister's Jeans"	3:16
6.	"Bellarine"	2:54
7.	"Cappuccino City"	2:54
8.	"Exclusive Grave"	3:46
9.	"How Long?"	3:06
10.	"The Hammer"	4:28

== Accolades ==
Publication	Country	Accolade	Year	Rank
Paste	US	The 50 Best Albums of 2018	2018	8
NME	UK	NME’s Albums of the Year 2018	2018	18
