= A Comfortable Man =

Studio album by Cathal Smyth
- Released: 7 October 2014 (limited LP release); 11 May 2015
- Studios: Iguana Studio, London; Sarm Studios, London; The Premises Studios, London; Cathal's studio
- Genre: Pop
- Length: 46:10
- Label: Phoenix Rising Recording Co.
- Producers: Charlie Andrew; Kirsty Mangan; Paul Powell; Felix Quine

Singles from A Comfortable Man
- 1. "You're Not Alone" Released: 9 March 2015; 2. "Do You Believe in Love?" Released: 11 May 2015; 3. "Are the Children Happy?" Released: 5 May 2015

A Comfortable Man is the debut studio album by British singer-songwriter and multi-instrumentalist Cathal Smyth. It was produced by Charlie Andrew and Kirsty Mangan. The album was first made available in 2014 as a vinyl LP, limited to 1,000 copies and sold during Smyth's three night performance at Wilton's Music Hall. It was given a full release by the Phoenix Rising Recording Co. in 2015, reaching No. 68 on the UK Albums Chart and No. 10 on the Independent Albums Chart.

Many tracks on A Comfortable Man were written following the breakdown of Smyth's 28-year marriage in 2005. After completing the recording of the album, Smyth departed Madness to embark on his solo career. Speaking of the album to the BBC in 2015, Smyth said: "The cycle of songs started with "Are the Children Happy?" and "Love Song No. 7". It was a very emotional time, it was a very cathartic act writing those songs. I decided I wanted to sit on them for some time to let the dust settle. When you're in Madness and you're writing, it keeps you occupied. It's [was] a very personal project on the sidelines. And I always think timing is essential and when it feels right."

A music video for "You're Not Alone" was released in September 2014. The song was released as a download single in March 2015, followed by "Do You Believe in Love?" and "Are the Children Happy?".

== Critical reception ==
Professional ratings
Review scores
Source	Rating
The Irish Times	3/5 stars
Mojo	4/5 stars
The Times	positive
Uncut	8/10 stars

Upon release, the album was met with acclaim from critics and audiences alike. Tony Clayton-Lea of The Irish Times stated: "A Comfortable Man is a cathartic exercise. Smyth has taken the opportunity to lay bare his thoughts about personal matters across a sequence of gently wrought, beautifully orchestrated balladic pop songs with rather morose titles." The Times picked A Comfortable Man as their album of the week and commented: "Smyth's simple, honest lyrics and straightforward delivery mean that songs such as "Are the Children Happy?" make a real emotional connection with the listener, while his gift for a pop melody allows for light relief on the upbeat numbers."

Mojo wrote: "...the musical document of his journey is appropriately desolate but altogether rather moving. Essentially it's Smyth playing Victorian parlour piano accompanied by mournful strings and celestial backing vocals." Uncut commented: "The LP springs to life when Smyth ignores the ponderous ballads and hits the pop jugular. "Do You Believe in Love?" and "She's Got the Light" are joyous naif: "Love Song No. 7" tugs effectively at the heart strings, while "Are the Children Happy?" is the most gut wrenchingly poignant divorce song you'll ever hear."

== Track listing ==
All tracks are written by Cathal Smyth.

No.	Title	Length
1.	"You're Not Alone"	4:44
2.	"Shabat She Comes"	3:55
3.	"A Comfortable Man"	3:24
4.	"Goodbye Planet Earth"	4:49
5.	"Do You Believe in Love?"	3:41
6.	"Love Song No. 7"	4:03
7.	"She's Got the Light"	3:27
8.	"A Requiem for Common Sense"	5:25
9.	"Are the Children Happy?"	3:10
10.	"Love Song No. 9"	3:47
11.	"All My Lovin'"	3:07
12.	"The Wren's Burial"	2:31

== Charts ==
Chart (2015)	Peak position
UK Independent Albums Breakers Chart	1
UK Independent Albums Chart	10
UK Albums Chart	68

== Personnel ==
Adapted from the album liner notes.

Musicians

- Cathal Smyth – vocals, backing vocals, piano (1, 8, 9, 12), whistling (4)
- Charlie Andrew – drums (2, 4, 5, 7), percussion (2–5, 7, 10, 11), bass (2), synthesizer (4), backing vocals (4, 6), arrangements
- Kirsty Mangan – violin (1–6, 8, 10–12), piano (3, 4, 6, 7, 10), backing vocals (2, 4, 5, 7, 8), viola (3, 6, 12), dilruba (3), Hammond organ (7), Rhodes (10), arrangements
- Tim Adam-Smith – guitar (2–5, 7, 10, 11), piano (5)
- Adrian Acolatse – double bass (2, 5–8, 10, 11)
- Paul Powell – bass (8, 12)
- Sarah Bateson – ukulele (2, 4, 6, 7, 11), backing vocals (2)
- Robert Cherry – accordion (5, 7, 11)
- Rachael Lander – cello (3, 6, 12)
- Jo Archard – violin (1)
- Benedict Taylor – viola (1)
- Rhian Porter – cello (1)
- Madeleine Kate Hylland – additional vocals (1, 8)
- The Noctis Chamber Choir – choir (1, 3, 6, 8, 11)
- Jordan Florence Hess – children backing vocals (8)
- Sophie Rose Davidson – children backing vocals (8)
- Lily Charlotte Davidson – children backing vocals (8)
- Joe Duddell – choir (1, 3, 6, 8, 11) and strings arrangements (1)

Production

- Charlie Andrew – production (2–7, 9–11), additional production (8, 12), recording (2–7, 10, 11), strings recording (8)
- Kirsty Mangan – production (2–7, 9–11), additional production (8, 12)
- Paul Powell – production (1), main vocal production and recording (from original demo) (11)
- Felix Quine – production (8, 12), recording (8, 12)
- Alan Winstanley – recording (1), mixing (1–12)
- Cameron Gower Poole – engineer (1)
- Tom Campbell – assistant engineer (1)
- Jason Howes – recording (9)
- Simon Halfon – sleeve design
- Raquel Martinez Royo – cover and colour photography
- Simon Pantling – black and white photography
