= In Search of Elusive Little Comets =

Studio album by Little Comets
- Released: 31 January 2011
- Genre: Indie rock
- Length: 34:43
- Label: Dirty Hit
- Producer: Michael Coles

Little Comets chronology
In Search of Elusive Little Comets (2011)	Life is Elsewhere (2012)

Singles from In Search of Elusive Little Comets
- 1. "One Night in October" Released: 9 February 2009; 2. "Adultery" Released: 26 October 2009; 3. "Isles" Released: 17 October 2010; 4. "Joanna" Released: 17 January 2011

In Search of Elusive Little Comets is the debut studio album by Newcastle band Little Comets. The album was released on 31 January 2011, both digitally and physically. It included four singles: "Adultery", "One Night in October", "Isles" and "Joanna". The record received mixed reviews and peaked at number 54 in the UK Albums Chart.

== Musical style ==
The album opens with many "strong kicking choruses...ridden with a funky, feel-good, indie disco pound and tight guitar riffs". It "continues to emphasize Little Comets' variety and eclecticism". In sum, it is "an album containing fun, danceable, eclectic eccentricity, a slick, fresh indie vibe and a concluding powerful ballad".

== Track listing ==
No.	Title	Length
1.	"Adultery"	3:01
2.	"One Night in October"	3:23
3.	"Joanna"	3:09
4.	"Her Black Eyes"	4:00
5.	"Isles"	2:44
6.	"Darling Alistair"	2:50
7.	"Tricolour"	2:32
8.	"Lost Time"	3:18
9.	"Dancing Song"	2:30
10.	"Mathilda"	3:06
11.	"Intelligent Animals"	4:10

iTunes Bonus Tracks
No.	Title	Length
12.	"Friday Don't Need It"	2:59

== Singles ==
Year	Title	Chart Positions		Album
Year	Title	UK	UK IND	Album
2009	"One Night In October"	–	3	In Search of Elusive Little Comets
2009	"Adultery"	–	–	In Search of Elusive Little Comets
2010	"Friday Don't Need It"	–	–	In Search of Elusive Little Comets
2010	"Isles"	–	31	In Search of Elusive Little Comets
2011	"Joanna"	–	–	In Search of Elusive Little Comets

== Charts ==
Chart	Position
UK	54

== Personnel ==
- Robert Coles - Lead Vocals & Guitar
- Michael Coles - Lead Guitar
- Matthew 'the cat' Hall - Bass
- Mark Harle - Drums
