= Memoirs (Rox album) =

Studio album by Rox
- Released: June 7, 2010
- Recorded: 2009–2010
- Genre: Soul; reggae
- Label: Rough Trade
- Producer: Al Shux; Simone Lombardi; Sun G; TMS

Rox chronology
Memoirs (2010)	Grey Area (2015)

Singles from Memoirs
- 1. "No Going Back" Released: 2009; 2. "My Baby Left Me" Released: 2010; 3. "I Don't Believe" Released: 2010; 4. "Rocksteady" Released: 2010

Memoirs is the debut album by British singer Rox.

== Track listing ==
Memoirs track listing
No.	Title	Writer(s)	Producer(s)	Length
1.	"No Going Back"	Roxanne Tataei; Samuel Dixon	Al Shux	4:15
2.	"Do as I Say"	Tataei; Kevin McPherson	Al Shux	3:47
3.	"Page Unfolds"	Tataei; Alexander Shuckburgh	Al Shux	3:36
4.	"I Don't Believe"	Tataei; Tom Barnes; Ben Kohn; Pete Kelleher; Gavin Jones	Al Shux; TMS	2:36
5.	"My Baby Left Me"	Tataei; Adam Midgley	Al Shux	3:33
6.	"Forever Always Wishing"	Tataei; Midgley	Al Shux	3:13
7.	"Heart Ran Dry"	Tataei; Sean McGhee	Sun G; Al Shux	4:28
8.	"Breakfast in Bed"	Tataei; Matt Prime	Al Shux	3:28
9.	"Precious Moments"	Tataei; Gordon Williams; Timothy Shider; Donavan Jackson; Christopher Meredith; Astor Campbell	Sun G; Al Shux	4:49
10.	"Rocksteady"	Tataei; Anna Wayland; Williams	Simone Lombardi	3:29
11.	"Oh My"	Tataei; Midgley	Sun G; Al Shux	4:39
12.	"Sad Eyes" "Gallais" (hidden track)	Tataei; Darren Lewis; Tunde Babalola; Tataei	Sun G; Al Shux	8:43

iTunes bonus track
No.	Title	Length
13.	"3rd Degree"	3:18

== Charts ==
Chart (2010)	Peak position
United Kingdom	97
Netherlands	37
France	76
Italy	11
