= Blaenavon (band) =

English indie rock band

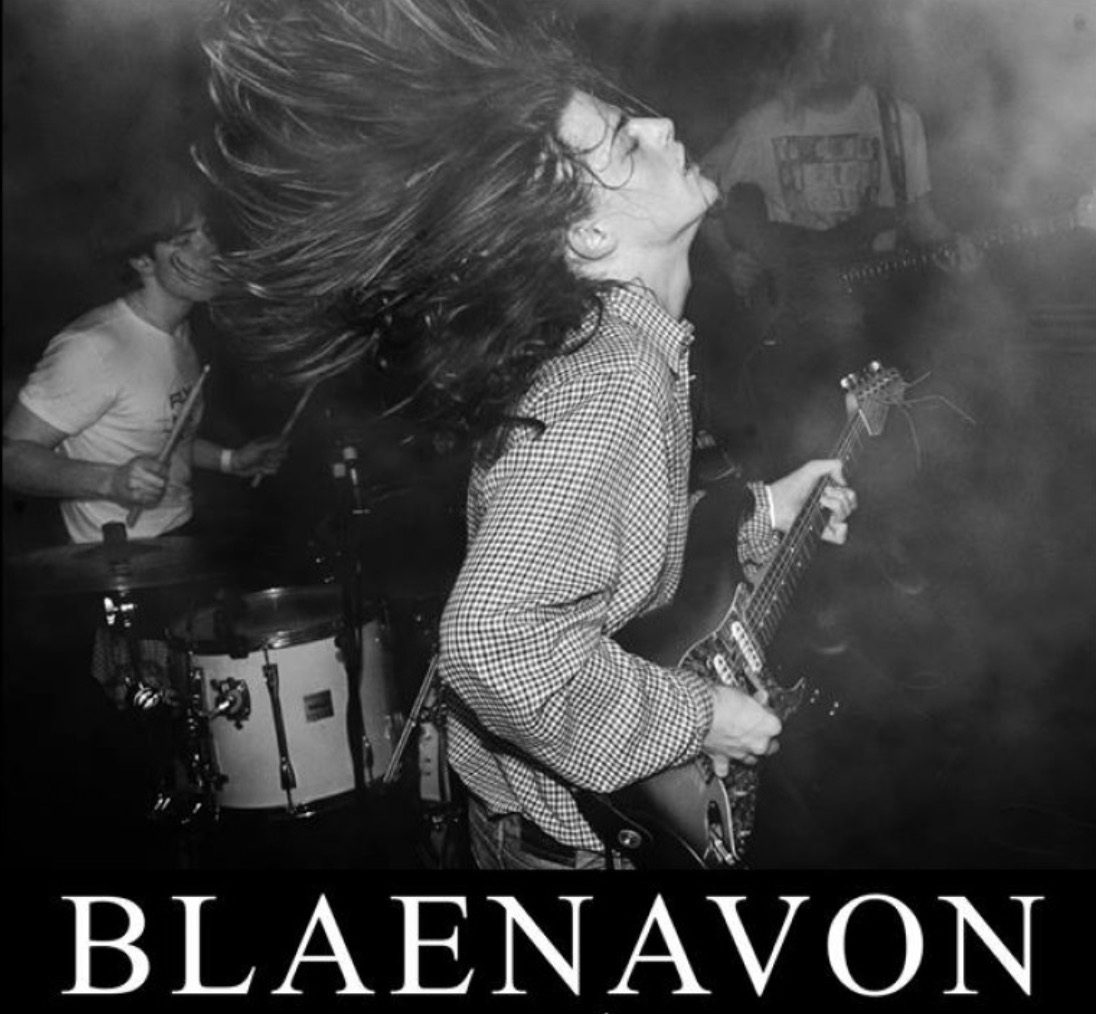
- Blaenavon Live

Background information
- Origin: Hampshire, England
- Genres: Indie rock, indie pop
- Years active: 2013–2022
- Label: Transgressive
- Past members: Ben Gregory; Frank Wright; Harris McMillan; Scott Roach
- Website: blaenavon.com

Blaenavon was an English indie rock band based out of Hampshire. The band was composed of Ben Gregory (vocals, guitars), Frank Wright (bass), Scott Roach (guitars) and Harris McMillan (drums). The band formed in 2013, and released their first album, That's Your Lot in 2017. The album reached number 54 on the UK Albums Chart.

== History ==
The band came together when they were 14 years old and attending their local secondary school. The band grew from being a simple pastime as the boys won their final year talent contest in 2013 - performing a cover of Muse's "Knights of Cydonia". They played their first London gig at the Camden Assembly and signed a recording deal with Transgressive Records. They released their debut EP, 'Koso' in 2013 and produced their second EP, 'Miss World' by the end of 2015.

The band released their debut album through Transgressive in 2017. The album was made up of 12 tracks and received generally positive reviews. They worked with producer Jim Abbiss (Arctic Monkeys, Adele, Bombay Bicycle Club) to record the album. New member Scott Roach featured on the band's latest headline tour and was featured on the band's second album.

On 25 October 2019, the band released their second and final album Everything That Makes You Happy. In November 2022, frontman Ben Gregory announced that the band had disbanded. He is now pursuing a solo career whilst bassist Frank Wright and drummer Harris McMillan are playing in a folk-pop band Organ Morgan.

The band's official Twitter account is still active under the same handle, run by Gregory himself.

== Discography ==
=== Studio albums ===
List of studio albums, with selected chart positions and certifications
Title	Album details	Peak chart positions
Title	Album details	UK
That's Your Lot	Released: 7 April 2017; Label: Atlantic • Canvasback; Formats: CD, LP, digital download	54
Everything That Makes You Happy	Released: 25 October 2019; Label: Transgressive Records; Formats: CD, LP, digital download	

=== Extended plays ===
List of extended plays
Title	EP details
Koso	Released: 4 September 2013; Label: Transgressive, Paradyse; Formats: CD, LP, digital download
Miss World	Released: 30 October 2015; Label: Transgressive, Paradyse; Format: Streaming
Prague '99	Released: 15 August 2017; Label: Transgressive; Format: Digital download, streaming
