= Simple Gospel =

Live album by United Pursuit
- Released: August 14, 2015
- Genre: Worship, folk rock, indie folk, indie rock
- Length: 61:34
- Label: United Pursuit
- Producer: Garrett Sale, United Pursuit

United Pursuit chronology
Radiance (2009)	Simple Gospel (2015)

Simple Gospel is the second live album from United Pursuit. The group released the album on August 14, 2015. They worked with Garrett Sale, in the production of this album. The album was recorded over two nights in an old warehouse with the band set up in the round in the middle surrounded by the crowd.

== Critical reception ==
Professional ratings
Review scores
Source	Rating
Cross Rhythms	7/10 squares
Worship Leader	5/5 stars

Awarding the album five stars from Worship Leader, Jay Akins states, "With Simple Gospel, United Pursuit invites us to worship with their family and the larger family of God." Timothy Monger, reviewing the album at AllMusic, writes, "United Pursuit Band offer a passionate, folk-inspired take on modern worship music." Giving the album a seven out of ten for Cross Rhythms, says, "'Simple Gospel' is aptly named - it successfully invites you strip away all the distractions and complications in life and focus on the simple, wonderful truth of Jesus' love." Alex Sanfilippo wrote on The Good Christian how he 'fell in love with it' and that 'the spirit of worship behind it is very strong'.

== Awards and accolades ==
The album was ranked No. 13 on Worship Leader's Top 20 Albums of 2015 list.

== Track listing ==
No.	Title	Length
1.	"Head to the Heart"	5:20
2.	"Your Love Changes Everything"	5:07
3.	"Simple Gospel"	6:00
4.	"Met by Love"	5:29
5.	"You're All Around Me (Spontaneous)"	2:12
6.	"Let It Happen"	8:10
7.	"Seasons Change"	5:37
8.	"Since Your Love"	8:02
9.	"Never Going Back"	9:03
10.	"Hidden"	6:34
Total length:		61:34

== Chart performance ==
Chart (2015)	Peak position
US Billboard 200	85
US Christian Albums (Billboard)	2
US Independent Albums (Billboard)	6
