= Unfaithfully Yours (album) =

Studio album by General Fiasco
- Released: 30 July 2012
- Recorded: 2011–2012 at Start Together Studios, Belfast.
- Genre: Alternative rock, indie.
- Label: Dirty Hit
- Producer: Rocky O'Reilly (exp. tracks 3, 6 & 7 – produced by Robert and Michael Coles)

General Fiasco chronology
Don't You Ever EP (2012)	Unfaithfully Yours (2012)

Singles from Unfaithfully Yours
- 1. "The Age That You Start Losing Friends" Released: 18 August 2011; 2. "Waves" Released: 3 November 2011; 3. "Don't You Ever" Released: 17 January 2012; 4. "Bad Habits" Released: 20 June 2012; 5. "Gold Chains" Released: 15 October 2012

Unfaithfully Yours is the last studio album by Northern Irish indie rock band General Fiasco. Recorded at Start Together Studios in Belfast, Northern Ireland with producer Rocky O'Reilly, the album was released on 30 July 2012, on independent label Dirty Hit. It was the first album to feature guitar/keyboard player Stuart Bell and the first to be released through Dirty Hit Records.

The band recorded throughout 2011 and 2012. Prior to the release of the album, two EP's were released. Waves EP was released on 13 November 2011 and the Don't You Ever EP was released on 4 March 2012. Both EP's were only available on download. The band completed three UK tours in 2011 and 2012 and also appeared at SXSW festival in Texas. The band also took part in the concerts supporting the Olympic Torch Relay organised by Coca-Cola at various events in both Northern Ireland and Scotland where they played many songs from the album.

== Background and recording ==
After the release of first album, Buildings, the band took a brief break from gigs and recording after a tour in October 2010. The band claimed to have written nearly 60 songs during the break. On 24 March 2011, the band made a TV appearance on Other Voices to perform an acoustic version of new song "Hollows". Throughout the coming months, the band performed a few gigs and also spent a lot of time in the studio. On 6 September, it was announced that the band had departed from previous record label Infectious Records and signed to Dirty Hit and in October 2011 it was announced that an EP consisting of new material, Waves, was to be released. The band embarked on a 7-date tour of the UK. The band posted various photos on their Instagram account of them in the studio working on the album. In March, the Don't You Ever EP was released and the band toured 5-dates of the UK.

On 22 March 2012, the band announced via Twitter that the album had been completed. The first track on the album, "Gold Chains", was played on BBC Radio 1 on the last BBC introducing NI on 28 May 2012. The album was due to be released on 30 June 2012 with two album launches in the Mandela Hall (16+) and the Stiff Kitten (18+), however all dates were pushed back a month.

== Album title ==
In an interview with Alternative Ulster, the band told the story behind the album name. "We got an endorsement from an amplifier company who looked after us for years, but their amps kept breaking. So we joked about how we were going to write them a letter saying, ‘Dear such-and-such, thanks for all the great service and the amplifiers but we’re going to use this other brand now. Unfaithfully yours, General Fiasco’. As soon as we said it, it seemed to sum up everything that was going on with the band at the time."

== Reception ==
Professional ratings
Review scores
Source	Rating
RTÉ	4/5 stars
Alternative Ulster	8/10 stars

The album received mainly positive reviews from critics. BBC claimed, although a better attempt than their debut, "(Unfaithfully Yours is) another solid rather than brilliant General Fiasco album: one for glorious summer sing-alongs, with a finger poised over the skip button."

In the Daily Mirror, Radio DJ Rigsy claimed that the album was his second favourite of the year, losing out to Two Door Cinema Club's Beacon.

Due to the band's lack of touring and festival appearances, album promotion was extremely limited and was further put to a halt when the band cancelled a tour and announced they were to go on an indefinite hiatus in January 2013.

== Track listing ==
All tracks are written by General Fiasco.

No.	Title	Length
1.	"Gold Chains"	2:46
2.	"Closer"	3:10
3.	"Waves"	2:45
4.	"Brother Is"	4:27
5.	"Bad Habits"	3:22
6.	"Hollows"	3:01
7.	"The Age That You Start Losing Friends"	2:41
8.	"Sleep"	3:57
9.	"This Is Living"	3:24
10.	"Don't You Ever"	3:07
11.	"Temper Temper"	3:02
12.	"The Bottom"	4:31
13.	"Maybe I Might (iTunes bonus track)"	3:45
Total length:		41.58

== Personnel ==
- Owen Strathern – vocals, bass
- Enda Strathern – guitar, backing vocals, piano
- Stuart Bell – guitar, keyboard, lap steel guitar, programming.
- Stephen Leacock – drums, percussion
- Robert Coles – Viola on "Hollows"
