= John Smith (folk musician) =

English folk guitarist and singer

- Origin: Essex, England
- Genres: Folk; indie folk
- Occupation: Singer-songwriter
- Instruments: Guitar; vocals
- Label: BARP Ltd (UK)
- Website: johnsmithjohnsmith.com

John Smith is an English folk guitarist and singer from Devon.

He has toured Britain, Europe and America extensively, both solo and with artists such as Iron and Wine, James Yorkston, John Martyn, David Gray, Jools Holland, Gil Scott-Heron and Lisa Hannigan (whose records he also plays on). Smith remained unsigned to any record label for several years, but released several self-funded albums. Recent releases have been distributed by Thirty Tigers.

After the death of John Martyn, he appeared on a tribute album to Martyn alongside Bombay Bicycle Club, Paolo Nutini, Snow Patrol, Phil Collins and Beth Orton.

His unique guitar style has influenced many artists including James Newton Chadwick and Ben Howard. In particular Smith uses a variety of open tunings and percussive techniques (especially on the song "Winter").

== Discography (Albums) ==
- The Fox and the Monk (2006)
- Live At The Roundhouse (2007)
- Map or Direction (2009)
- Eavesdropping (2011)
- Great Lakes (2013)
- Headlong (2017) 15 UK Indie
- Hummingbird (2018) 30 UK Indie
- Live In Chester (2020) (Commoner/Thirty Tigers)
- The Fray (2021) (Commoner Records) 40 UK Indie
- The Fray: Variations (2022) - 6-track album
- The Living Kind (2024) (Commoner/Thirty Tigers) 10 UK indie
