= Little Comets =

English indie rock band

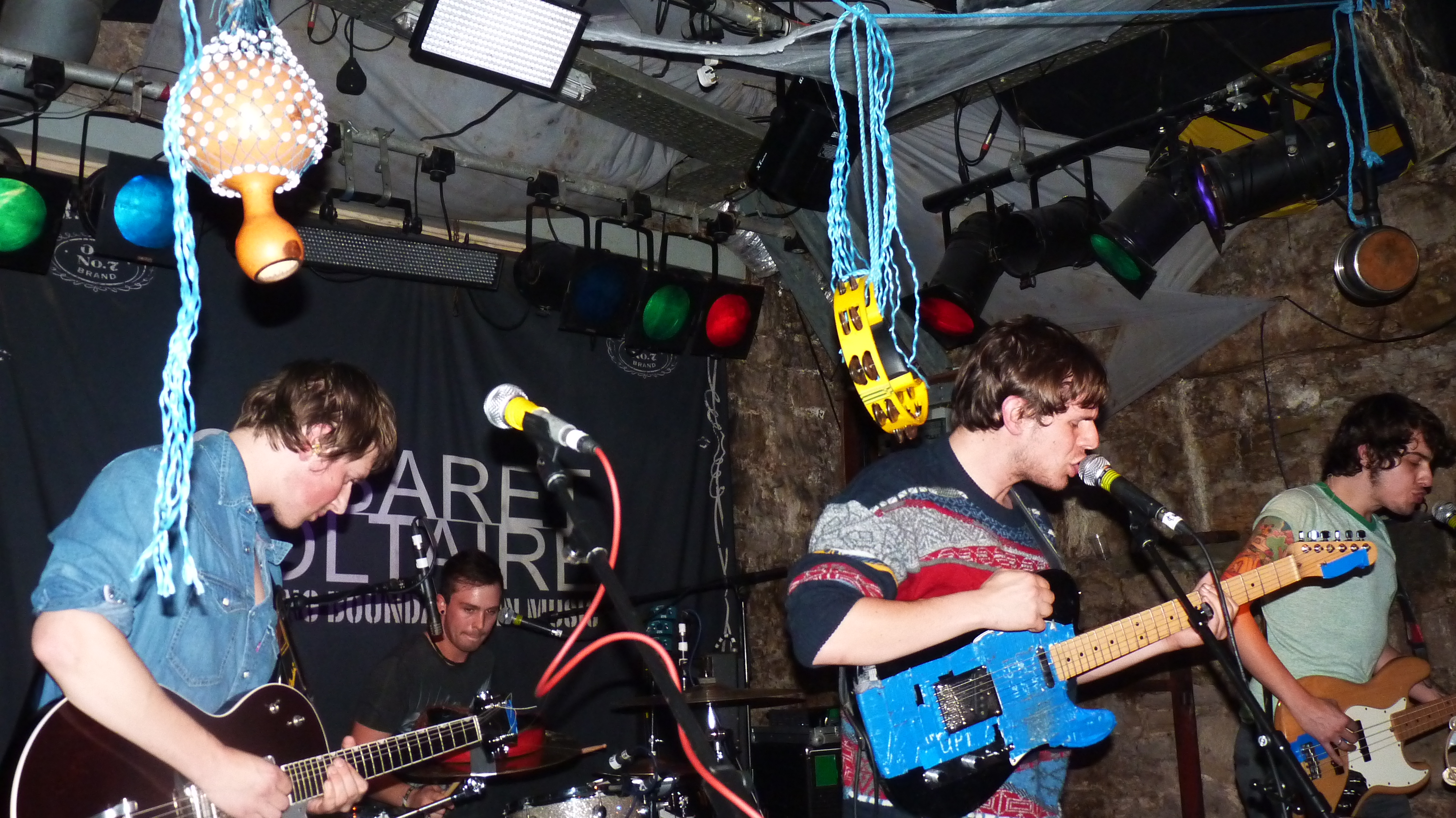

Background information
- Origin: Tyne and Wear, England
- Genres: Indie
- Years active: 2008–present
- Labels: Dualtone Records; Columbia Records; Lucky Number Music; Dirty Hit; The Smallest Label
- Members: Robert Coles; Michael Coles; Matthew Hall; Matt Saxon; Nathan Greene
- Past members: Mark Harle; David Green

Little Comets are an English indie rock trio from Jarrow and Washington, Tyne and Wear. Known for their lyrical references to everyday life and melodic guitar-driven sound, the band first gained attention in 2009 after signing with Columbia Records. Following their departure from the label in 2010, they signed with independent label Dirty Hit, who released their debut album, In Search of Elusive Little Comets, on 31 January 2011. Their second album, Life Is Elsewhere, was also released through Dirty Hit on 15 October 2012. The band released their third album, Hope Is Just a State of Mind (2015), and fourth album, Worhead (2017), under their own label, The Smallest Label.

== Career ==
On 9 February 2009, the band released their debut single, "One Night in October", through Lucky Number Records on vinyl and digital download. The single debuted at number three on the UK Independent Chart and received support from BBC Radio 1 DJs Huw Stephens, Zane Lowe and Sara Cox, who all played the track on their respective shows.

Having signed with Columbia Records in 2009, the band release their second single, "Adultery", on 26 October 2009. They promoted the release by touring in support of acts such as Hockey, The Twang and The Noisettes. Columbia terminated the contract in 2010. The band stated that Columbia initially refused to return their debut album before eventually dropping them, claiming the material "didn’t sound enough like Ke$ha".

The band’s debut album, In Search of Elusive Little Comets, was released on 31 January 2011 through Dirty Hit. It was preceded by the release of the track "Joanna" on 17 January. The album was produced by lead guitarist Michael Coles and mixed by Rich Costey, and went on to chart at number 54 on the UK Albums Chart.

In May 2011, drummer Mark Harle left the band to pursue other opportunities. Several shows scheduled for that month were postponed to October.

The track "Dancing Song" was used in a Radox television advert during the summer of 2012.

The band’s second album, Life Is Elsewhere, was released through Dirty Hit on 15 October 2012 and peaked at number 70 on the UK Albums Chart. Produced by lead guitarist Michael Coles and mixed by Daniel Rejmer, the album featured three singles: "Worry", "Jennifer" and "A Little Opus". Drumming duties were split across the album, with new drummer, David "Greenie" Green performing on most tracks, former drummer Mark Harle appearing on "Tense / Empty" and "Worry", and George Daniel of The 1975 contributing to "Bayonne" and "Waiting in the Shadows in the Dead of Night".

The band’s third album, Hope Is Just a State of Mind, was released on 16 February 2015 through their own label, The Smallest Label. It peaked at number 31 on the UK Albums Chart.

The band’s fourth album, Worhead, was released on 10 March 2017 through The Smallest Label. It peaked at number 83 on the UK Albums Chart.

== Discography ==
=== Studio albums ===
Year	Album	UK Albums Chart position
2011	In Search of Elusive Little Comets: Released 31 January 2011; Label: Dirty Hit	54
2012	Life is Elsewhere: Released 15 October 2012; Label: Dirty Hit	70
2015	Hope Is Just a State of Mind: Released 16 February 2015; Label: The Smallest Label	31
2017	Worhead: Released: 10 March 2017; Label: The Smallest Label	83

=== EPs ===
Year	Album	UK Albums Chart position
2011	Worry EP: Released 12 December 2011	—
2012	Jennifer and Other Short Stories: Released 28 May 2012	—
2014	The Gentle EP: Released 23 February 2014	—
2014	Salt EP: Released 16 June 2014	—
2014	The Sanguine EP: Released 3 November 2014	—
2020	Baywatch EP: Released 12 November 2020	—
2025	CEMETERIES: Released 16 June 2025	—

=== Singles ===
Year	Title	Chart positions		Album
Year	Title	UK	UK IND	Album
2009	"One Night in October"	—	3	In Search of Elusive Little Comets
2009	"Adultery"	—	—	In Search of Elusive Little Comets
2009	"Friday Don't Need It"	—	—	In Search of Elusive Little Comets
2010	"Isles"	—	31	In Search of Elusive Little Comets
2011	"Joanna"	—	—	In Search of Elusive Little Comets
2011	"Worry"	—	28	Worry EP
2012	"Jennifer"	—	34	Jennifer and Other Short Stories EP
2012	"A Little Opus"	—	—	Life Is Elsewhere
2013	"Violence Out Tonight"	—	—	Life Is Elsewhere
2017	"Common Things"	—	—	Worhead
2017	"The Man Who Wrote Thriller"	—	—	Worhead
2017	"Hunting"	—	—	Worhead
2018	"M62"	—	—	TBA
2018	"The Punk Is in the Detail"	—	—	TBA
2019	"The Sneeze"	—	—	Baywatch EP
2019	"Alive at All"	—	—	TBA
2019	"American Tuna"	—	—	Baywatch EP
2019	"3 Minute Faltz"	—	—	Baywatch EP
2020	"Baywatch"	—	—	Baywatch EP
2021	"Total Abject Paranoia"	—	—	Baywatch EP

== Members ==
Current members

- Michael Coles – lead guitar, backing vocals (2008–present)
- Robert Coles – lead vocals, guitar, piano (2008–present)
- Matt Hall – bass guitar, backing vocals (2008–present)

Touring musicians

- Matt Saxon – keyboards, guitar, backing vocals, samples (2015–present)
- Nathan Greene – drums (2015–present)

Former members

- Mark Harle – drums (2008–2011)
- David "Greenie" Green – drums (2011–2015)
