= Buildings (album) =

Studio album by General Fiasco
- Released: 22 March 2010
- Recorded: 2008–2010 at Manor Park Studio, Belfast.
- Genre: Alternative rock, indie
- Label: Infectious Records
- Producer: Neal Calderwood

General Fiasco chronology
Buildings (2010)	Waves EP (2011)

Singles from Buildings
- 1. "Rebel Get By" Released: 2008; 2. "Something Sometime" Released: 2009; 3. "We Are The Foolish" Released: 2009; 4. "Ever So Shy" Released: 15 March 2010; 5. "I'm Not Made Of Eyes" Released: 23 May 2010

Buildings is the debut album by Northern Ireland trio General Fiasco, and which was released on 22 March 2010. The band launched the album at the Mandela Hall in Belfast on the night of 21 March. The album appeared briefly at number 77 in the UK Albums Chart.

== Background and Recording ==
Between 2009 and 2010, the band were constantly recording, and by mid-2009, they planned to release their debut album independently but the independent release was scrapped after being signed to Infectious Records in 2009, many songs that were re-recorded, the first of which was "We Are The Foolish" and was released as the band's first single's through Infectious Records. There were over 20 songs recorded for the album but only 12 made the cut. Omitted tracks included: "Sell Yourself," "Maybe I'm A Little Bit Strange," "I Like It When You're Naked," "Get Me," "Little Doors," "A Wise Decision," and "Desert Hearts."
The first official single to promote the album was "Ever So Shy". The single was a success which earned the band daytime airplay on stations such as BBC Radio 1 and regularly being featured on MTV.
Owen Strathern said in an interview "(the album) reflects the frustration felt watching friends succumb to alcohol and doing nothing to better their lives. It's all quite upbeat, poppy and rocky but the contents are all pretty bleak," says General Fiasco's Owen Strathern, "It was being aware of everybody wrecking themselves and not realising it. I'm sure everyone has something they really want to strive for, something they really want to achieve and it's the frustration of not being fit to achieve it yourself and watching people not even try."
The album was launched at a sell-out gig at the Mandela Hall in Belfast on the night of 21 March 2010 and was released in HMV the following day.

== Promotion ==
The band appeared on numerous TV stations to perform in the weeks leading up to and during the album release, songs that were mainly performed were "We Are The Foolish," "Ever So Shy" and "Sinking Ships." The band's music was regularly featured in TV shows such as Jersey Shore and The Inbetweeners.

== Critical response ==
Professional ratings
Review scores
Source	Rating
NME	3/10 stars
Rock Sound	7/10 stars
RTÉ	4/5 stars
Ultimate Guitar	9/10 stars

The album received mixed reactions. BBC however gave a negative review claiming that it was perfunctory. The Belfast compared them to the Northern Ireland trio Ash, who were also signed to Infectious Records. Owen Strathern said in an interview with Matthew McCreary of the newspaper, "We don't want to be Ash.... It's a coincidence that we are trio from Northern Ireland and a even bigger coincidence that we were signed to the same record label. But I think we have our own thing going on, enough not to have to worry about being in someone's shadow."

== Track listing ==
All tracks are written by General Fiasco.

No.	Title	Length
1.	"We Are The Foolish"	3:35
2.	"Ever So Shy"	3:24
3.	"Please Take Your Time"	3:13
4.	"Buildings"	6:08
5.	"I'm Not Made of Eyes"	3:21
6.	"Sinking Ships"	3:06
7.	"Rebel Get By"	3:20
8.	"Talk to my Friends"	3:23
9.	"Dancing With Girls"	3:04
10.	"First Impressions"	3:54
11.	"Start at the Top (iTunes bonus track)"	3:00
12.	"Something Sometime (iTunes bonus track)"	3:47

== Charts ==
Chart (2010)	Peak position
UK Albums (OCC)	77

== Personnel ==
- Owen Strathern – Lead vocals and bass guitar
- Enda Strathern – Guitar and backing vocals
- Stephen Leacock – Drums
- Danny Keane – Cello on "Sinking Ships" and "Buildings"
- Oli Langford – Violin & viola on "Sinking Ships" and "Buildings"
