= Contemporary folk music =

Genre of popular music centered around Anglophonic folk revivals

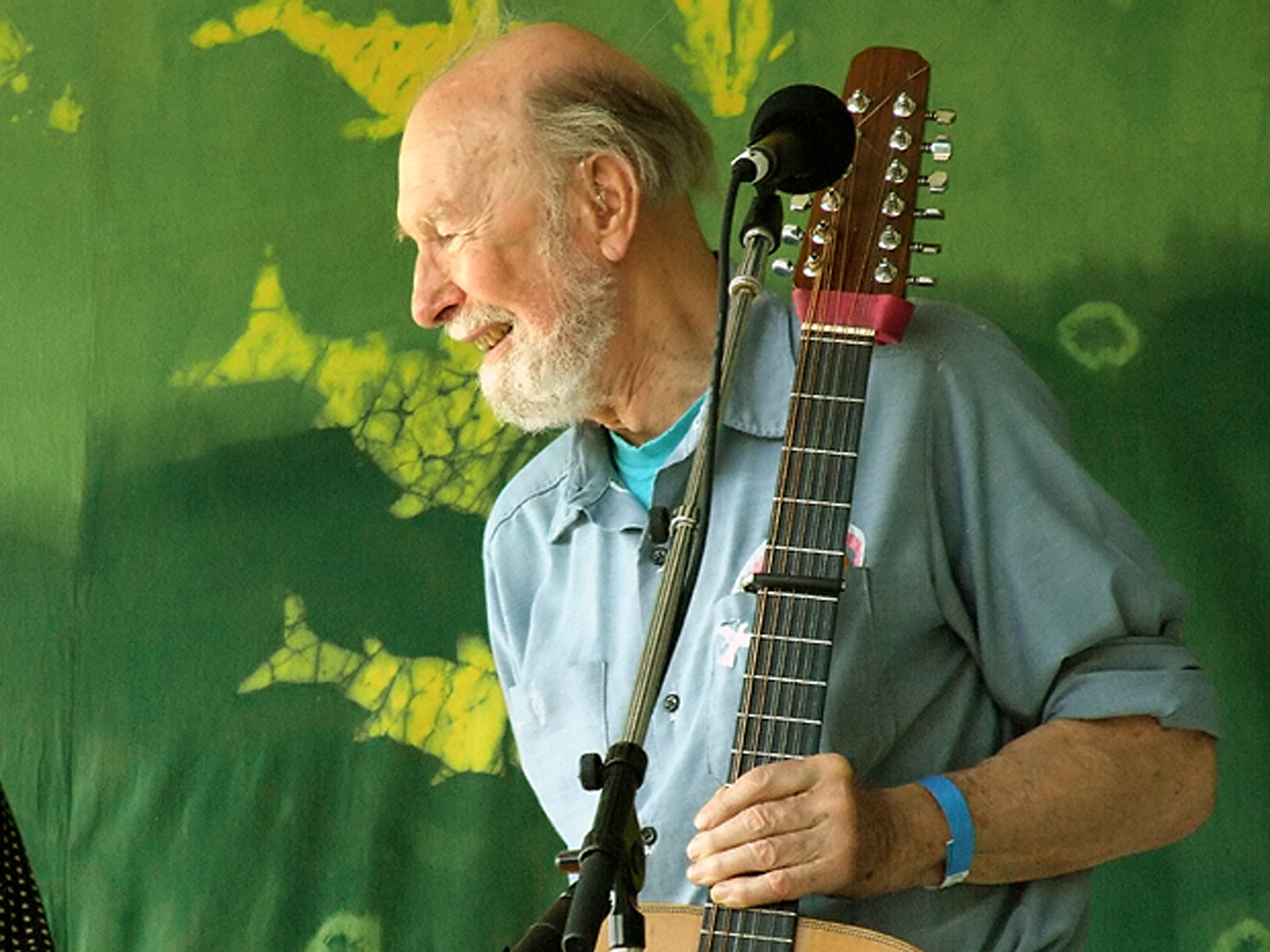
- Pete Seeger at the Clearwater Festival in 2007
- Other names: Folk music, folk revival music
- Stylistic origins: Folk music (American, English, Appalachian, Celtic); Roots revival; old-time music
- Cultural origins: Early 20th century
- Typical instruments: See folk instruments
- Derivative forms: Skiffle; country folk; pop

Subgenres
- Progressive folk; American primitive guitar; nerd-folk; filk

Fusion genres
- Anti-folk; folk baroque; folk metal; folk punk; folk rock; folk-pop; folktronica; indie folk; jazz folk; neofolk; psychedelic folk

Other topics
- List of folk music traditions; bluegrass; country; blues; folk blues

Contemporary folk music refers to a wide variety of genres that emerged in the mid-20th century and afterwards which were associated with traditional folk music. Starting in the mid-20th century, a new form of popular folk music evolved from traditional folk music. This process and period is called the (second) folk revival and reached a zenith in the 1960s. The most common name for this new form of music is also "folk music", but is often called "contemporary folk music" or "folk revival music" to make the distinction. The transition was somewhat centered in the United States and is also called the American folk music revival. Fusion genres such as folk rock and others also evolved within this phenomenon. While contemporary folk music is a genre generally distinct from traditional folk music, it often shares the same English name, performers and venues as traditional folk music; even individual songs may be a blend of the two.

While the Romantic nationalism of the first folk revival had its greatest influence on art music, the "second folk revival" of the later 20th century brought a new genre of popular music with artists marketed through concerts, recordings and broadcasting. One of the earliest figures in this revival was Woody Guthrie, who sang traditional songs in the 1930s and 1940s as well as composing his own. Other major performers who emerged from the 1940s to the early 1960s included Pete Seeger, The Kingston Trio, Bob Dylan, Joan Baez, Peter, Paul and Mary, Phil Ochs and Tom Paxton. In the UK, the folk revival fostered a generation of musicians such as Fairport Convention, Richard Thompson, Donovan, Martin Carthy, and Pentangle, who achieved initial prominence in the 1960s. The folk revival spawned Canada's first folk wave of internationally successful artists such as Neil Young, Gordon Lightfoot, Leonard Cohen, Joni Mitchell, and Buffy Sainte-Marie.

The mid-1960s through the early 1970s was associated with large musical, political, lifestyle, and counterculture changes. Folk music underwent a related rapid evolution, expansion and diversification at that same time resulting gaining popularity among masses. Major changes occurred through the evolution of established performers such as Bob Dylan, Joan Baez, Judy Collins, and Peter, Paul and Mary, and also through the creation of new fusion genres with rock and pop. During this period, the term "protest music" was often used to characterize folk music with topical political themes. The Canadian performers Gordon Lightfoot, Leonard Cohen, Bruce Cockburn, and Joni Mitchell represented such fusions and enjoyed great popularity in the U.S. Starting in the 1970s folk music was fueled by new singer-songwriters such as Joni Mitchell, Neil Young, and Harry Chapin.

Other subgenres of folk include anti folk, folk punk, indie folk, folktronica, freak folk, and Americana and fusion genres such as folk metal, progressive folk, psychedelic folk, neofolk, and turbo-folk.

== Definitions ==
Definitions of "contemporary folk music" are generally vague and variable. Here, it is taken to mean all music that is called folk that is not traditional folk music, but rather, a set of genres that began with and then evolved from the folk revival of the mid-20th century. According to musician and singer-songwriter Hugh Blumenfeld, for the American folk scene, "it's not just about the music. The definitions are political, social, and economic as well as aesthetic. But if it can't be defined, we can at least describe what people who consider themselves folk music fans generally listen to." Though he considers folk music to be difficult to define, Blumenfeld lists some observed consistencies:

- In general, it is Anglo-American, embracing acoustic and/or tradition-based music from the United Kingdom and United States.
- Musically, it is mainly Western European in its origins; linguistically, it is predominantly English-based. Other musical modes and languages, rightly or wrongly, tend to get separated out and grouped under "World Music", even if they are considered traditional within their respective cultures.
- The few exceptions to this model are derived mainly from prevailing political/historical conditions in the Anglo-American world and the demographics of folk fans: Celtic music, blues, some Central and South American music, Native American music, and Klezmer.

== Folk revival of the mid-20th century in the English-speaking countries ==
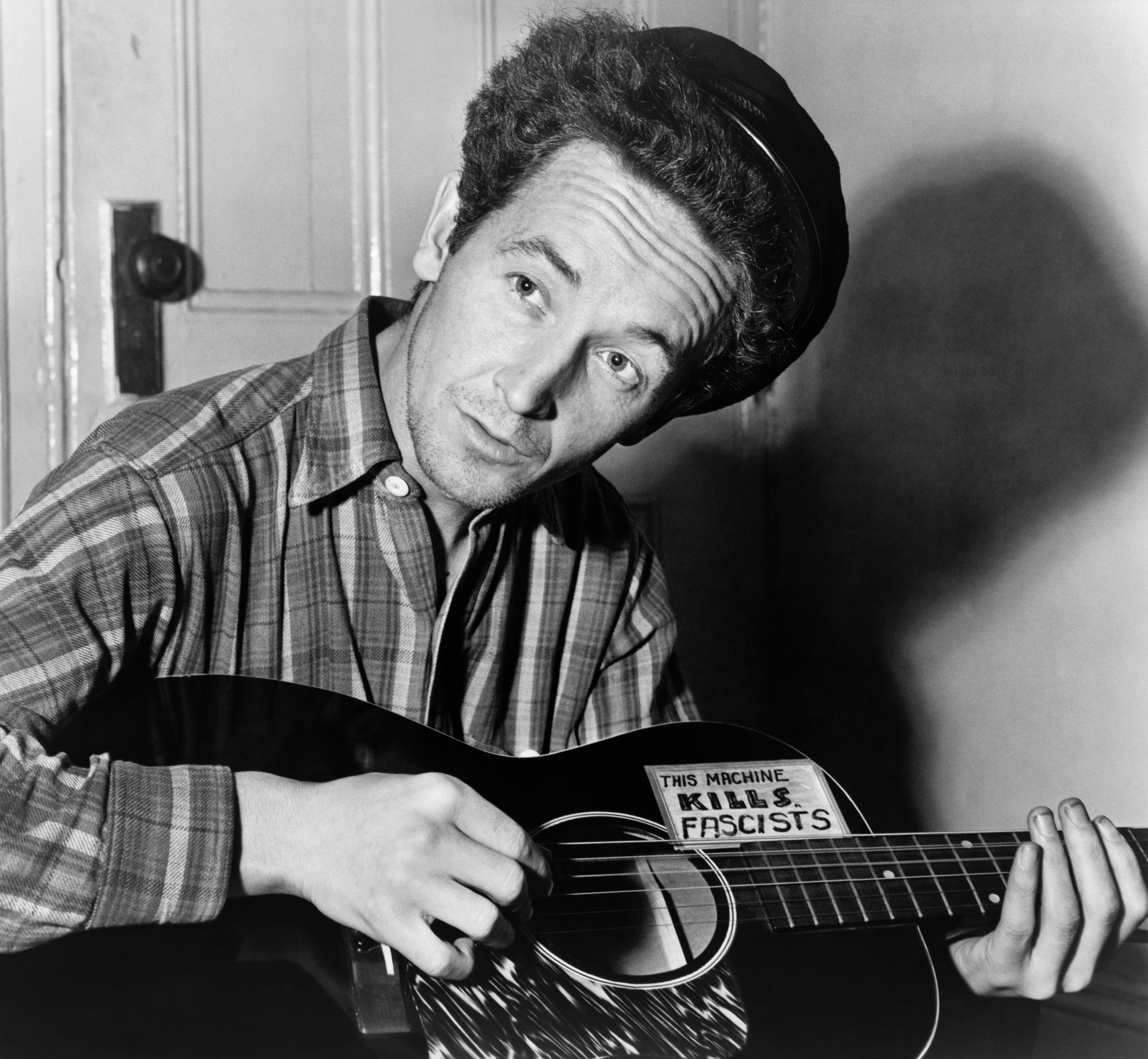
Woody Guthrie

Beginning in the post World War II era, folk revivals occurred in Europe, Canada, and the United States, and developed through the 1960s, with the subject matter of this music influenced by the political and social climates of the day. According to The North American Folk Music Revival, "the folk music revival began... as a North Eastern American urban phenomenon, and spread from city to city throughout the entire continent and beyond, to Western Europe", with "enthusiasts" generally being middle-class university students. While instrumentation of folk music varies across countries and regions, music of the North American folk revival tended to use "acoustic guitar, harmonica, banjo, mandolin, autoharp, violin, and accordion".

While the Romantic nationalism of the folk revival had its greatest influence on art-music, the "second folk revival" of the later 20th century brought a new genre of popular music with artists marketed through concerts, recordings and broadcasting. This is the genre that remains as "contemporary folk music" even when traditional music is considered to be a separate genre. One of the earliest figures in this revival was Woody Guthrie, who sang traditional songs in the 1930s and 1940s as well as composing his own. Among Guthrie's friends and followers as a collector, performer, and composer was Pete Seeger.

Notable figures of the American folk revival include Elizabeth Cotten and Odetta. Cotten, a guitar and banjo player who developed the "Cotten style" of guitar fingerpicking, released her first album, Freight Train and Other North Carolina Folk Songs and Tune, in 1958 with the help of Mike Seeger, which also illuminates the use of guitars tuned to open keys, another common element found in folk music. Odetta, who is known for blending her operatic vocal background with blues and folk songs, was notably active in the Civil Rights Movement, which is reflected in her music. Both Cotten and Odetta performed at the first Newport Folk Festival.

In the 1930s, Jimmie Rodgers, in the 1940s Burl Ives, in the early 1950s Seeger's group the Weavers and Harry Belafonte, and in the late 1950s the Kingston Trio as well as other professional, commercial groups became popular. Some who defined commercialization as the beginning of this phase consider the commercial hit Tom Dooley by the Kingston Trio in 1958 as marking the beginning of this era. In 1963–1964, the ABC television network aired the Hootenanny television series devoted to this brand of folk music and also published the associated magazine ABC-TV Hootenanny. Starting in 1950, the Sing Out!, Broadside, and The Little Sandy Review magazines helped spread both traditional and composed songs, as did folk-revival-oriented record companies.

In the United Kingdom, the folk revival fostered young artists like the Watersons, Martin Carthy and Roy Bailey and a generation of singer-songwriters such as Bert Jansch, Ralph McTell, Donovan and Roy Harper; all seven achieved initial prominence in the 1960s. Bob Dylan, Paul Simon and Tom Paxton visited Britain for some time in the early 1960s, the first two especially making later use of the traditional English material they heard.

In 1950, prominent American folklorist and collector of traditional songs Alan Lomax came to Britain and met A. L. 'Bert' Lloyd and Ewan MacColl, a meeting credited as inaugurating the second British folk revival. In London, the colleagues opened the Ballads and Blues Club, eventually renamed the Singers' Club, possibly the first folk club in the UK; it closed in 1991. As the 1950s progressed into the 1960s, the folk revival movement gathered momentum in both Britain and America.

In much of rural Canada, traditional and country-folk music were the predominant styles of music until the 1950s, ahead even of the globally popular jazz and swing. Traditional folk took this predominance into early Canadian television with many country-themed shows on its early airwaves. All Around the Circle (1964–1975) showcased the traditional Irish- and English-derived music of Newfoundland, for example. But by far the most important of these was Don Messer's Jubilee (1957–1973), which helped to bridge the gap between rural country-folk and the folk revival that was emerging from urban coffee shops and folk clubs. The show helped to launch the careers of country-folk singers Stompin' Tom Connors and Catherine McKinnon.

The folk revival spawned Canada's first folk wave of internationally successful artists such as Gordon Lightfoot, Leonard Cohen, Ian & Sylvia, Neil Young, Joni Mitchell, and Buffy Sainte-Marie. At the same time, Quebec folk singer-songwriters like Gilles Vigneault and groups such as La Bottine Souriante were doing the same in the French-speaking world. English-speaking Canadian folk artists tended to move to the United States to pursue larger audiences until the introduction of so-called "Canadian content" rules for radio and television in the 1970s. At the same time, Canadian folk music became more formalized and commercialized with the rise of specialized folk festivals (beginning with the Miramichi Folksong Festival in 1958), increased radio airplay on rock, pop, and easy listening radio stations, the introduction of the Juno Award for Folk Artist of the Year in 1971, and even an academic journal the Canadian Folk Music Journal in 1973. The mid- and late 1960s saw fusion forms of folk (such as folk rock) achieve prominence never before seen by folk music, but the early 1960s were perhaps the zenith of non-fusion folk music prominence in the music scene.

During the Great Depression, folk music reflected social realities of poverty and disempowerment of common people through vernacularized lyrics expressing the harsh realities of hard times and poverty. Often newly composed songs in traditional style by writers like Guthrie also featured a humorous and satirical tone. Most of the audience for folk music in those years were part of the working class, and many of these songs expressed resistance to the social order and an anger towards the government.

=== The mid-1960s through the early 1970s ===
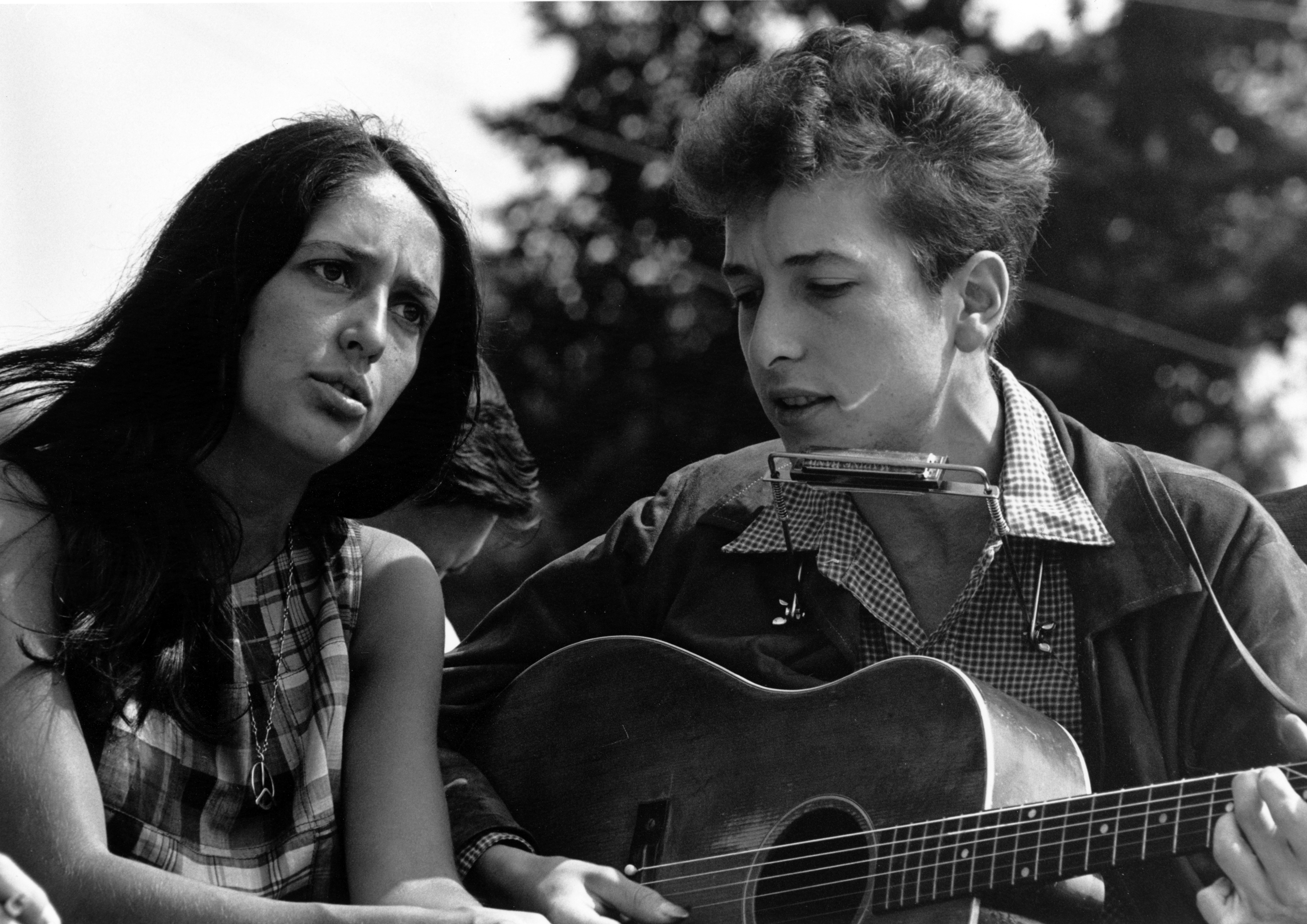
Joan Baez and Bob Dylan during the civil rights "March on Washington for Jobs and Freedom", August 28, 1963.

The large musical, political, lifestyle, and counterculture changes most associated with "the 60s" occurred during the second half of the decade and the first year or two of the 1970s. Folk music underwent a related rapid evolution, expansion and diversification at that same time. Major changes occurred through the evolution of established performers such as Bob Dylan, Joan Baez, Judy Collins, the Seekers and Peter Paul and Mary, and also through the creation of new fusion genres with rock and pop. Much of this evolution began in the early 1960s and emerged into prominence in the mid and late 1960s. One performance "crucible" for this evolution was Greenwich Village New York. Dylan's use of electric instruments helped inaugurate the genres of folk rock and country rock, particularly by his album John Wesley Harding.

These changes represented a further departure from traditional folk music. The Byrds with hits such as Seeger's "Turn! Turn! Turn!" were emblematic of a new term folk rock. Barry McGuire left the New Christy Minstrels and recorded "Eve of Destruction" in 1965. Other performers such as Simon & Garfunkel and the Mamas & the Papas created new, hard-to-classify music that was folk-inflected and often included in discussions of folk rock.

During this period, the term "protest music" was often used to characterize folk music with topical political themes. The convergence of the civil rights movement and folk music on the college campus led to the popularity of artists like Bob Dylan and his brand of protest music. As Folk singers and songwriters such as Phil Ochs, Buffy Sainte-Marie, Arlo Guthrie and Tom Paxton followed in Woody Guthrie's footsteps, writing "protest music" and topical songs and expressing support for various causes including the American Civil Rights Movement and anti-war causes associated with the Vietnam War. Songs like Dylan's "Blowin' in the Wind" became an anthem for the civil rights movement, and he sang ballads about many other current issues of the time, such as "Hard Rain's Gonna Fall" about the Cuban missile crisis. Dylan is quoted having said "there's other things in this world besides love and sex that're important, too." A number of performers who had begun their careers singing largely traditional material, as typified by Joan Baez and Judy Collins, began to write their own material.

The Canadian performers Gordon Lightfoot, Leonard Cohen, Bruce Cockburn and Joni Mitchell represented such fusions and enjoyed great popularity in the U.S.; all four were eventually invested with the Order of Canada. Many of the acid rock bands of San Francisco began by playing acoustic folk and blues. The Smothers Brothers television shows featured many folk performers, including the formerly blacklisted Pete Seeger.

Bonnie Koloc is a Chicago-based American folk music singer-songwriter who made her recording debut in 1971. In 1968 Melanie, released her first album in 1968 with several popular songs with a folk/pop blend.

The mid to late Sixties saw the development of British folk rock, with a focus on indigenous (European, and, emblematically, English) songs. A key British folk rock moment was the release of Fairport Convention's album Liege and Lief. Guitarist Richard Thompson declared that the music of the band demanded a corresponding "English Electric" style, while bassist Ashley Hutchings formed Steeleye Span to pursue a more traditional repertoire performed in the folk rock style. Following his own departure from the group, Thompson and his wife Linda released six albums as a duo which integrated folk rock and art rock. Fairport Convention, Pentangle, Alan Stivell and Mr. Fox's work included electrification of traditional musical forms.

== Mid-1970s through present day ==
Starting in the 1970s, folk music was fueled by new singer-songwriters such as Steve Goodman, John Prine, Emmylou Harris, Joni Mitchell, John Denver, Harry Chapin, and many more. In the British Isles, the Pogues in the early 1980s and Ireland's the Corrs in the 1990s brought traditional tunes back into the album charts. The Corrs were active from 1990 to 2006 and performed Celtic and pop music, and created a blend of the two. Carrie Newcomer emerged with Stone Soup in 1984 and has been performing individually since 1991. Brandi Carlile, Patty Griffin, and Rising Appalachia are popular folk artists c. 2019.

In the 1980s, the Washington Squares played "throwback" folk music. Suzanne Vega performed folk and protest folk-oriented music. The Knitters promulgated cowpunk or folk punk, which eventually evolved into alt country. More recently the same spirit has been embraced and expanded on by artists such as Miranda Stone and Steve Earle.

In the second half of the 1990s, once more, folk music made an impact on the mainstream music via a younger generation of artists such as Eliza Carthy, Kate Rusby and Spiers and Boden. Canada's biggest-selling folk group of the 1990s and 2000s was the Celtic, rock-tinged Great Big Sea from Newfoundland, who have had four albums certified platinum in Canada.

Folk metal bands such as Korpiklaani, Skyclad, Waylander, Ensiferum, Ithilien and Finntroll meld elements from a wide variety of traditions, including in many cases instruments such as fiddles, tin whistles, accordions and bagpipes. Folk metal often favours pagan-inspired themes.

Viking metal is defined in its folk stance, incorporating folk interludes into albums (e.g., Bergtatt and Kveldssanger, the first two albums by once-folk metal, now-experimental band Ulver). Mumford & Sons a folk rock and indie folk band was formed in 2007 and achieved prominence in 2010. Shenandoah Run formed in 2011 to bring contemporary American folk music of the 1960s to modern listeners.

=== Specialty subgenres ===
Filk music can be considered folk music stylistically and culturally (though the 'community' it arose from, science fiction fandom, is an unusual and thoroughly modern one). Neofolk began in the 1980s, fusing traditional European folk music with post-industrial music, historical topics, philosophical commentary, traditional songs and paganism. The genre is largely European but it also influences other regions. Pagan Folk music is prominent in Germany, the United Kingdom, Scandinavian countries and Slavic countries with singers like David Smith (aka Damh the Bard) and Bands like Danheim, Faun, Omnia, Wardruna and Arkona. Most bands join the folk genre with other musical genres like metal or electronica.

Anti folk began in New York City in the 1980s. Folk punk, known in its early days as rogue folk, is a fusion of folk music and punk rock. It was pioneered by the London-based Irish band the Pogues in the 1980s. Industrial folk music is a characterization of folk music normally referred to under other genres, and covers music of or about industrial environments and topics, including related protest music.

Other subgenres include indie folk, progressive folk, folktronica, freak folk and Americana and fusion genres such as folk metal, psychedelic folk, and neofolk (of which dark folk and pagan folk are categorized).

=== Electronic folk music ===
Music mixing elements of folk and electronic music, or "folktronica", (or "ethnic electronica") that features uses of acoustic instruments with variable influences and choice of sounds. The Ashgate Research Companion to Popular Musicology describes folktronica as "a catch-all [term] for all manner of artists who have combined mechanical dance beats with elements of acoustic rock or folk."

The 1991 album Every Man and Woman is a Star by Ultramarine is credited as a progenitor of the new music; it featured a pastoral sound and incorporated traditional instruments such as violin and harmonica with techno and house elements. According to The Sunday Times Culture's Encyclopedia of Modern Music, essential albums of the genre are Four Tet's Pause (2001), Tunng's Mother's Daughter and Other Songs (2005), and Caribou's The Milk of Human Kindness (2005).

More "worldbeat" influenced electronic folk acts include Bryn Jones with his project Muslimgauze (before his death in 1999), the artists of Asian underground movement (Cheb i Sabbah, Asian Dub Foundation, Joi, State of Bengal, Transglobal Underground, Natacha Atlas), Shpongle, Home Sweet Somewhere, Mavka, Ott, Zavoloka, Linda George, Banco de Gaia, AeTopus, Zingaia, Afro-Celt Sound System, Métisse, A Tribe Called Red, Go_A, and some early work by Yat-Kha (with Ivan Sokolovsky).

=== Country folk ===
Country folk
- Stylistic origins: Country; country gospel; Southern gospel; folk; progressive folk; bluegrass
- Cultural origins: Late 1960s
- Typical instruments: Guitar (acoustic, electric, pedal steel); harmonica; banjo; mandolin; fiddle; accordion; double bass; autoharp; piano

Other topics
- Country rock; folk rock; Americana (music); neotraditional country; alternative country; indie folk

Country folk as a genre label is a rather nebulous one, but one that has been employed often at least since the mid-1970s. For dedicated enthusiasts, the category largely includes the works of contemplative post-Dylan singer-songwriters, who were influenced by his and other late 1960s and 1970s artists' country rock sounds, but who, recording slightly later, preferred a gentler, more acoustic-dominant sound that allowed focus on the lyrics. The significant element that distinguishes "country folk" from the "folk" music on Dylan's contemporaries' recordings in the 1960s was the re-admission of country and bluegrass music instrumentation—mandolin, banjo, fiddle, and resophonic and electric steel guitars—into the mix; country rock's success with urban audiences had paved the way for this hybrid. For aficionados, viewing country folk as a subgenre of country is inaccurate, as it is not aimed at a country music audience, in the main.

Some of the definitive country folk artists from the early years include Harry McClintock, John Prine, Kate Wolf, and Nanci Griffith—all singer-songwriters with thoughtful lyrics whose arrangements are backed by the aforementioned instruments. By the 1980s, record labels such as Rounder and Sugar Hill specialized in recording country folk artists

The category does overlap with the post-country rock trajectories of other artists who moved away from the mainstream market as country rock's own fortunes waned at the close of the 1970s. Emmylou Harris moved into neo-traditionalist country, Chris Hillman into progressive bluegrass, brother harmony duo (with Herb Pedersen), and Bakersfield revival. By the start of the 1990s, these sounds, as well as others, would inspire musical amalgams categorized as alternative country music and americana, yet "country folk" continues to be used for the gentler sounds of singers such as Iris DeMent, Kate & Anna McGarrigle, and Gillian Welch.

Even during the 1970s, as the acoustic, early country music-inflected sounds of country folk were making it distinct from other styles of post-1960s singer-songwriter music, it had varying degrees of overlaps with the sounds of progressive country music (such as Kris Kristofferson, Townes Van Zandt, Guy Clark), outlaw country (Billy Joe Shaver, Waylon Jennings, Willie Nelson, Johnny Cash), progressive bluegrass (Tony Rice albums Cold on the Shoulder and Native American), and other country rock inflected recordings (Tom Rush's Tom Rush and Merrimack County and Gordon Lightfoot and Jimmy Buffett's 1970s catalog). None of these were specifically marketed or received as "country folk", however. Still, later low-key, acoustic-dominant country-inflected recordings by these and many other earlier artists have at times loosely, but not inaccurately, been defined as country folk by some sources.

More recently, the majority of artists whose music could be classified as country folk find their home in the americana genre, including Brandi Carlile, Jason Isbell, Parker Millsap, Patty Griffin, and Amanda Shires, with several artists being interchangeably described as both folk and americana artists, such as Sarah Jarosz who has received Grammy Awards in both genre categories.

== European contemporary folk music ==
In Europe, the term "folk" is used just for a special modern genre (the traditional folk is called folklore or national music).

The Czech folk music is influenced by Czech traditional music an songwriters, "tramping" music, as well as by English-language country and contemporary-folk music, spirituals and traditionals, bluegrass, chanson etc. In the second half of the 20th century, all the similar genres coexisted as a protest multigenre, in contrast to the official pop music, to the rock music etc. Since 1967, the "Porta" festival became the centre of this genre, originally defined as a festival of country & western & tramping music. Acoustic guitars were the most typical instrument for them all.

== Bibliography ==
- Donaldson, Rachel Clare (May 2011), Music for the People: the Folk Music Revival And American Identity, 1930–1970 (PDF) (Ph.D. Dissertation), Nashville, Tennessee: Vanderbilt University
- Gilliland, John (1969). "Blowin' in the Wind: Pop discovers folk music" (audio). Pop Chronicles. University of North Texas Libraries.
