= Comments of the Inner Chorus =

Studio album by Tunng
- Released: 22 May 2006
- Recorded: 2006
- Genre: Folk
- Length: 42:30
- Label: Full Time Hobby FTH019
- Producer: Mike Lindsay

Tunng chronology
Mother's Daughter and Other Songs (2005)	Comments of the Inner Chorus (2006)	Good Arrows (2007)

Professional ratings
Review scores
Source	Rating
AllMusic	4.5/5 stars
Pitchfork	7/10
Drowned in Sound	6/10
The Guardian	4/5 stars
The Skinny	2/5 stars

Comments of the Inner Chorus is English band Tunng's second album, released in late May 2006 on Full Time Hobby Recordings in the UK. The songs "Woodcat" and "Jenny Again" were both released as limited edition singles.

A common theme picked up on by reviewers after the album's release is that of the pastoral and organic. The use of surreal lyrics ("I'll look for a man to turn me into a hare" on the song "Woodcat", for example) led to comparisons to The Wicker Man and Brothers Grimm . The album, much like its 2005 predecessor Mother's Daughter and Other Songs, has noticeable electronica influences leading many to bracket the album, and by extension Tunng, into the folktronica movement.

A limited-edition version of the album was also released which contained two extra tracks: "Band Stand" and "Bodies".

== Track listing ==
1. "Hanged" (Mike Lindsay) – 2:01
2. "Woodcat" – (Lindsay, Sam Genders) – 3:51
3. "The Wind-Up Bird" – (Lindsay) – 4:16
4. "Red and Green" – (Genders) – 2:40
5. "Stories" – (Lindsay) – 2:47
6. "Jenny Again" – (Genders) – 3:22
7. "Man in the Box" – (Lindsay, Genders) – 4:56
8. "Jay Down" – (Lindsay, Genders, Ashley Bates, Phill Winter) – 3:38
9. "It's Because... We've Got Hair" – (Lindsay) – 3:03
10. "Sweet William" – (Genders) – 3:35
11. "Engine Room" – (Lindsay) – 8:16
12. "Band Stand" – 3:03
13. "Bodies" – 4:28

== Personnel ==
- Mike Lindsay – guitars, vocals
- Sam Genders – guitars, vocals
- Ashley Bates – Spanish guitar, bowed banjo, vocals
- Phill Winter – sampler, effects
- Becky Jacobs – vocals, melodica
- Martin Smith – beads, reeds, bells, shells, bones, stones
- Dave Lewis Lloyd – cello
- Sefa – harp
- Detta – flute

== Music videos ==
Music videos were made for "Woodcat", "Jenny Again" and "It's Because... We've Got Hair".
