= Christian Hardy =

British musician

- Birth name: Christian Hardy
- Born: 7 June 1979 (age 46)
- Origin: Burton upon Trent, East Staffordshire, England
- Genres: Indie
- Occupation: Musician
- Instrument: Piano
- Years active: 2005–present

Christian Hardy (born 7 June 1979) is a British singer, multi-instrumentalist and producer. He performs in The Leisure Society and Pop Crisis and is a member of Brighton's Willkommen Collective.

== The Leisure Society ==
Christian produced The Leisure Society's debut album The Sleeper (released 30 March 2009) with Nick Hemming, a friend from Burton Upon Trent. The album entered the iTunes folk chart at number one and received lavish critical praise, going on to be named iTunes Singer/Songwriter album of 2009 and a Rough Trade Album of the Year. The album was picked out by Brian Eno as his favourite record from a new band, prompting a meeting with Hardy and Hemming at his London studio.

The first single from the album, "The Last of the Melting Snow", was released on 15 December 2008, receiving an Ivor Novello nomination for 'Best Song Musically & Lyrically' plus extensive radio play on Zane Lowe's Radio 1 show. Marc Riley's BBC 6 Music show. Lauren Laverne's 6 Music show and Mark Radcliffe and Stuart Maconie's Radio 2 show, where they were voted 'Record of the Week' by listeners with a record 90% of the vote. The second single by The Leisure Society is called 'A Matter of Time' and was released on 16 March 2009. Like the first single, it was voted 'Record of the Week' on Radcliffe & Maconie's show. The Leisure Society signed to UK label 'Full Time Hobby' in July 2009 and re-released 'The Sleeper' with bonus EP 'A Product of the Ego Drain' on 5 October 2009. The third single 'Save It For Someone Who Cares' was also nominated for the Ivor Novello in the same category as the previous year.

The band covered children's classic "Inchworm" from Hans Christian Andersen for American Laundromat Records charity CD Sing Me To Sleep – Indie Lullabies, released worldwide on 18 May 2010.

Nick Hemming and Christian Hardy also play with childhood friend Tim West in The Climbers, whose debut album was released in May 2010.

The band's second album Into The Murky Water was produced by Christian and Nick Hemming, mixed by Christian, and was released on 20 May 2011. It received glowing critical praise and gave the band their first chart position.

The first single from the album, "This Phantom Life", was released with a video starring Green Wing's Mark Heap.

In June 2011, The Leisure Society were approached by Ray Davies to collaborate on his new songs, resulting in a performance as part of his Meltdown Festival.

== Other work ==
Hardy released new solo music in May 2017, working with Seb Hankins and Jon Cox under the name Pop Crisis. The video for debut single 'Tell Me I'm Wonderful' featured comedian Dom Joly.

Hardy produced the debut album by Kristin McClement, released in 2015 on Willkommen Records.

In November 2009, Willkommen Records announced that they would be releasing "The Good Ship" by The Climbers, which was produced by Hardy. BBC 6 Music DJs such as Marc Riley and Guy Garvey gave the record early radio play and positive feedback and it received a warm critical reception upon its release.

Hardy wrote, performed and produced the Christian Silva album Onward! which was released in April 2008 by UK label Something in Construction (home to The Silent League, Loney, Dear and Air France). Several tracks were mixed by Dave Bascombe (Funeral for a Friend, Depeche Mode, Bruce Springsteen). The album received glowing critical acclaim and was featured in the ABC TV drama series Brothers & Sisters. In 2008, Christian Silva performed with Amanda Palmer, The Silent League, White Rabbits, Peter, Bjorn & John and Maps.

== Discography ==
=== EPs and singles ===
- "Bring His Head" (Something in Construction, 2005 EP)
- "Break From The Past" (Something in Construction, 2006 Single)
- "The Last of the Melting Snow" (Willkommen Records, 2008 Single)
- "A Matter of Time" (Willkommen Records, 2009 Single)
- "Save It For Someone Who Cares" (Full Time Hobby, 2009 Single)
- "A Product of the Ego Drain" (Full Time Hobby, 2009 Bonus EP)
- "The Good Ship" (Willkommen Records, 2010 Single)

=== Albums ===
- Onward! (Something in Construction, 2008)
- The Sleeper (Willkommen Records, 2009)
- The Good Ship (Willkommen Records, 2010)
- Into The Murky Water (Full Time Hobby, 2011)
- Alone Aboard the Ark (Full Time Hobby, 2013)
- The Fine Art of Hanging On (Full Time Hobby, 2015)
