= Stanmer House =

Country house in Brighton and Hove, England

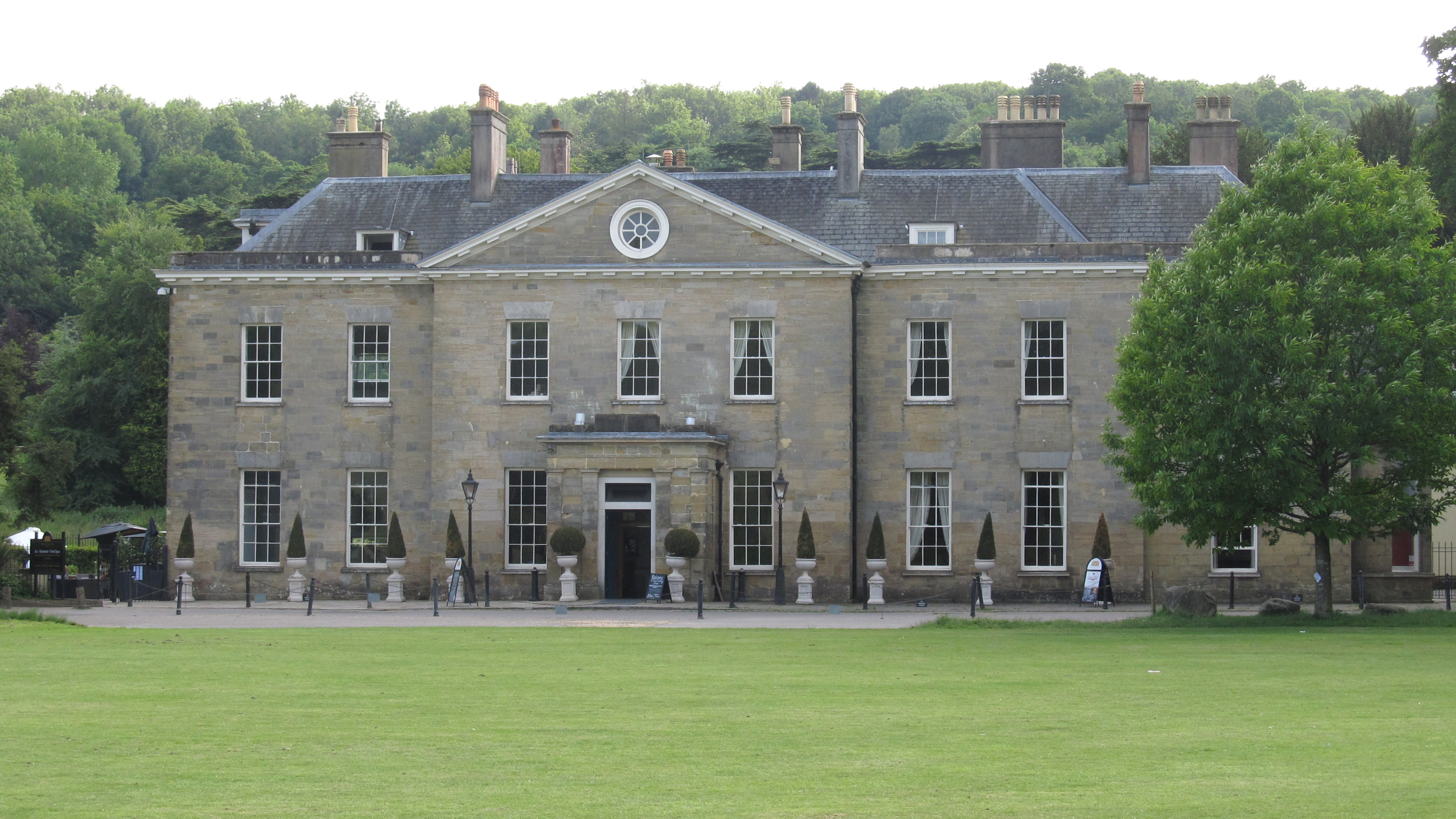
- The south front of Stanmer House in 2018

- Location within East Sussex

General information
- Type: Country house
- Architectural style: Palladian
- Location: Stanmer, East Sussex
- Coordinates: 50.8693°N 0.1021°W
- Year built: 1722

Technical details
- Floor count: 3

Design and construction
- Architect: Nicholas Dubois

Website
- stanmerhouse.uk

Listed Building – Grade I
- Official name: Stanmer House
- Designated: 2 November 1954
- Reference no.: 1380958

Stanmer House is a Grade I listed mansion set in Stanmer Park, close to the village of Stanmer and north-east of the city of Brighton and Hove, East Sussex, England. Constructed by the French architect Nicholas Dubois in 1722 in a Palladian style for the Pelham family, it incorporates the remains of an earlier house, and was again altered in 1860.

The house and park were bought by the local authority in 1947. The building was designated as Grade I listed in 1954; the former stables, built c. 1725 but much altered, are Grade II* listed.

Close to the University of Sussex campus, the house was used as a university administration building for some years in the 1960s while the campus was being built in the eastern portion of the park. After undergoing renovation, it reopened in June 2006 and for use as a restaurant and events venue.

In 2009, the Willkommen Collective started a music festival at Stanmer House. The first event featured performances from The Leisure Society, Robert Stillman, Peggy Sue and more in Stanmer House and grounds. The second festival took place on 12 September 2010 and was named Foxtrot. The lineup included Laura Marling, Anna Calvi, Francois & the Atlas Mountains and Sons of Noel and Adrian. The third annual festival took place in September 2011 and featured Hannah Peel, Sam Amidon, This Is The Kit and more.

Alexander Proud took over the lease of Stanmer House in 2016, renaming the House "Proud Stanmer House". In January 2020, Proud announced that Stanmer House would close to the public as the company entered liquidation, stating that a rent increase was to blame. However many customers had recently criticised the venue under his company's operation, stating that it was poorly run.

Shortly thereafter, Stanmer House was bought by local employer and property owner, KSD Support Services. It reopened in 2021, firstly as the House Cafe and eventually as Stanmer House in 2022.

Planning permission to convert the house into a hotel is in place, but KSD is uncertain if it will proceed with this plan.

Stanmer House is currently used as a dual-purpose building, with restaurant and cafe premises on the ground floor, and a number of local businesses occupying offices on the upper floors.
