= Knots (Sons of Noel and Adrian album) =

Studio album by Sons of Noel and Adrian
- Released: 21 May 2012
- Recorded: Brighton Electric
- Genre: Experimental music
- Length: 43:20
- Labels: Broken Sound Records (CD), Willkommen Collective (digital)
- Producer: Sons of Noel and Adrian

Sons of Noel and Adrian chronology
Sons of Noel and Adrian (2010)	Knots (2012)

Professional ratings
Review scores
Source	Rating
BBC Music	Favourable
The Line of Best Fit	Favourable
The 405	8/10 stars
For Folk's Sake	Favourable
Positive News	Favourable
Room Thirteen	12/13 stars

Knots is the second album by UK group Sons of Noel and Adrian. It was released in 2012 by Broken Sound. The album received favourable reviews, most of which noted marked departure from the debut as the band explored and combined a wider array of genres, especially the "influence of Chicago’s avant-garde rock and jazz scene and guitarists such as former Slint-man David Pajo in particular".

In the run-up to the album release the band released five cryptic 'teaser' videos featuring music from the album.

The first single, "Come Run Fun Stella Baby Mother of the World", received airplay on BBC 6Music from the likes of Gideon Coe and Lauren Laverne who made the track her "headphones moment".

== Track listing ==
1. "The Yard" – 4:12
2. "Come Run Fun Stella Baby Mother of the World" – 5:13
3. "Jellyfish Bloom" – 6:22
4. "Big Bad Bold" – 5:29
5. "Leaving Mary's Hand" – 3:00
6. "Cathy Come Home" – 4:24
7. "Black Side of the River" – 6:02
8. "Matthew" – 4:23
9. "Heroine" – 4:21
