= Aradhana =

Aradhana or Aaradhana is a Sanskrit word meaning an act of glorifying God or worship. It may refer to:

== Films ==
- Aradhana (1962 film), an Indian Telugu-language film directed by V. Madhusudhan Rao, starring Akkineni Nageswara Rao and Savitri
- Aradhana (1969 film), Indian Hindi-language romance film by Shakti Samanta, starring Rajesh Khanna and Sharmila Tagore
- Aradhana (1976 film), Indian Telugu-language film starring N. T. Rama Rao
- Aradhana (1977 film), Indian Malayalam-language by Madhu
- Aradhana (1981 film), a 1981 Sri Lankan film directed by Vijaya Dharma
- Aaradhane, a 1984 Indian Kannada-language film
- Aradhana (1987 film), Indian Telugu-language romance film by Bharathiraja, starring Chiranjeevi and Suhasini

== People with the given name ==
- Aradhana Misra (born 1974), Indian politician

== See also ==
- Aaradhna (born 1983), New Zealand R&B singer
- Aradhna, an Indian spiritual band from Cincinnati, USA
