= Cheek Mountain Thief (album) =

Studio album by Cheek Mountain Thief
- Released: August 13, 2012
- Genre: Indie folk, psychedelic folk, indie rock
- Label: Full Time Hobby

Professional ratings
Review scores
Source	Rating
Clash	7/10
DIY	6/10
The Guardian	3/5 stars
NME	4/10
The Observer	3/5 stars
Time Out London	3/5 stars

Cheek Mountain Thief is the first album by Cheek Mountain Thief, released on August 13, 2012.

== Track listing ==
1. "Cheek Mountain"
2. "Showdown"
3. "Spirit Flight"
4. "Strain"
5. "There's A Line"
6. "Attack"
7. "Nothing"
8. "Snook Pattern"
9. "Wake Him"
10. "Darkness"
