= ...And Then We Saw Land =

Studio album by Tunng
- Released: April 6, 2010
- Genre: Folktronica
- Length: 47:03
- Label: Thrill Jockey, Full Time Hobby
- Producer: Mike Lindsay

Tunng chronology
| Good Arrows (2007) | ...And Then We Saw Land (2010) | Turbines (2013) |

Professional ratings
Aggregate scores
| Source | Rating |
|---|---|
| Metacritic | 74/100 |
Review scores
| Source | Rating |
| Allmusic | 4/5 stars |

...And Then We Saw Land is the English band Tunng's fourth album, released in March 2010.

== Track listing ==
1. "Hustle" – 4:26
2. "It Breaks" – 3:27
3. "Don't Look Down or Back" – 4:56
4. "The Roadside" – 5:11
5. "October" – 3:47
6. "Sashimi" – 3:04
7. "With Whiskey" – 3:39
8. "By Dusk They Were in the City" – 5:13
9. "These Winds – 1:37
10. "Santiago" – 3:29
11. "Weekend Away" – 8:14
