= Sonic Sovereignty =

2023 non-fiction book

Sonic Sovereignty: Hip Hop, Indigeneity, and Shifting Popular Music Mainstreams
- Author: Liz Przybylski
- Publisher: New York University Press
- Publication date: July 2023
- ISBN: 9781479816910
- OCLC: 1391089827

Sonic Sovereignty: Hip Hop, Indigeneity, and Shifting Popular Music Mainstreams is a non-fiction book by Liz Przybylski about contemporary North American Indigenous music and musicians. It was published in 2023 by New York University Press.

== General references ==
- Bluev, Alex (2024). "Sonic Sovereignty: Hip Hop, Indigeneity, and Shifting Popular Music Mainstreams". MUSICultures. 51.
- Neu, Jessica (2025-12-04). "A Review of Sonic sovereignty: hip hop, indigeneity, and shifting popular music mainstreams: by Liz Przybylski, New York, NY, New York University Press, 2023, 328 pages, $32.00 USD (Paperback), 9781479816927". Critical Studies in Media Communication: 1–2. doi:10.1080/15295036.2025.2589232. ISSN 1529-5036.
- Sinnett, Ian (2024-07-29). "Liz Przybylski, Sonic Sovereignty: Hip Hop, Indigeneity, and Shifting Popular Music Mainstreams". International Journal of Communication. 18.
