= Turbines (album) =

Studio album by Tunng
- Released: 18 June 2013
- Genre: Folktronica
- Length: 39:01
- Label: Full Time Hobby
- Producer: Mike Lindsay

Tunng chronology
...And Then We Saw Land (2010)	Turbines (2013)	Songs You Make at Night (2018)

Professional ratings
Aggregate scores
Source	Rating
Metacritic	73/100
Review scores
Source	Rating
AllMusic	4/5 stars
This Is Fake DIY	7/10
DIY	3/5
The Guardian	4/5 stars

Turbines is the fifth studio album from English band Tunng. It was released in June 2013 under Full Time Hobby.

== Track listing ==
No.	Title	Length
1.	"Once"	4:38
2.	"Trip Trap"	3:53
3.	"By This"	4:36
4.	"The Village"	4:33
5.	"Bloodlines"	4:07
6.	"Follow Follow"	3:54
7.	"So Far From Here"	4:53
8.	"Embers"	3:39
9.	"Heavy Rock Warning"	4:48
