= Cheek Mountain Thief =

- Origin: Húsavík and Reykjavík, Iceland
- Genres: Indie rock, indie folk, psychedelic folk, folk rock
- Years active: 2011–present
- Labels: Full Time Hobby
- Members: Mike Lindsay

Cheek Mountain Thief is a project started in 2011 by Mike Lindsay, founding member of the UK twisted acid folk band Tunng. He lives in Iceland where he formed a band with musicians from Húsavík and Reykjavík.

Lindsay said that his love affair with Iceland began in 2006. It involved a girl, Harpa, and an unforgettable New Year's Eve party. In 2011, Lindsay returned to Iceland to rekindle that romance, and to record a new album under the name Cheek Mountain Thief, inspired by the landscape and the people of Iceland.

The band is signed on the London independent record label Full Time Hobby.

== Discography ==
Their first album under the name "The Cheek Mountain Thief" received good reviews as reported by sources.

- Cheek Mountain Thief · 2012
