= Alone Aboard the Ark =

Studio album by The Leisure Society
- Released: 16 April 2013
- Recorded: August–November 2012
- Studio: Konk Studios
- Genre: Rock; indie rock
- Length: 44:12
- Label: Full Time Hobby
- Producer: Dougal Lott; Nick Hemming; Christian Hardy

The Leisure Society chronology
| Into the Murky Water (2011) | Alone Aboard the Ark (2013) | The Fine Art of Hanging On (2015) |

Singles from Alone Aboard the Ark
- 1. "Fight for Everyone" Released: 22 March 2013; 2. "All I Have Seen" Released: 28 July 2013

Alone Aboard the Ark is the third studio album by English indie band The Leisure Society, released in April 2013 by record label Full Time Hobby. The album was recorded at Konk, the studio of The Kinks frontman Ray Davies.

Professional ratings
Aggregate scores
| Source | Rating |
|---|---|
| Metacritic | 66/100 |
Review scores
| Source | Rating |
| Allmusic | 4/5 stars |
| The Independent | 4/5 stars |
| MusicOMH | 4/5 stars |
| Line of Best Fit | 7.5/10 |
| This Is Fake DIY | 7/10 |
| Drowned in Sound | 6/10 |

== Track list ==
| No. | Title | Length |
|---|---|---|
| 1. | "Another Sunday Psalm" | 3:08 |
| 2. | "A Softer Voice Takes Longer Hearing" | 4:45 |
| 3. | "Fight For Everyone" | 3:48 |
| 4. | "Tearing the Arches Down" | 3:02 |
| 5. | "The Sober Scent of Paper" | 3:37 |
| 6. | "All I Have Seen" | 4:32 |
| 7. | "Everyone Understands" | 3:06 |
| 8. | "Life is a Cabriolet" | 2:26 |
| 9. | "One Man and His Fug" | 3:38 |
| 10. | "Forever Shall We Wait" | 3:16 |
| 11. | "We Go Together" | 6:28 |
| 12. | "The Last in a Long Line" | 2:26 |

== Personnel ==
- Nick Hemming – vocals, autoharp, banjo, bass, chromatic harmonica, dobro, acoustic guitar, classical guitar, electric guitar, handclapping, mellotron, mixing, percussion, upright piano, producer
- Christian Hardy – fender rhodes, electric guitar, handclapping, harmonium, mixing, omnichord, hammond organ, percussion, electric piano, upright piano, producer, synthesizer, vocals
- Darren Bonehill – bass
- Sebastian Hankins – drums, electronic drums, handclapping, percussion, vocals
- Mike Siddell – banjo, brass arrangement, glockenspiel, electric guitar, handclapping, mandolin, orchestral arrangements, string arrangements, violin, vocals
- Helen Whitaker – flute, alto flute, handclapping, orchestral arrangements, synthesizer, vocals
- Josephine Aniyama – background vocals
- Daniel Broncano – clarinet, bass clarinet
- Nick Etwell – trumpet
- Jamie Hutchinson – violin
- Tom Leaper – clarinet, alto saxophone, soprano saxophone, tenor saxophone
- Ben Thigg – cello
- Dave Williamson – trombone
- Dougal Lott – engineer, mixing, producer
- Jonas Persson – engineer
- Robin Schmidt – mastering
- Josh Green – assistant engineer
- Owen Davey – artwork, layout
