= Songs You Make at Night =

Studio album by Tunng
- Released: 24 August 2018
- Studio: Coronet Studios, London
- Genre: Folktronica
- Length: 42:22
- Label: Full Time Hobby
- Producer: Mike Lindsay

Tunng chronology
| Turbines (2013) | Songs You Make at Night (2018) | This Is Tunng...Magpie Bites and Other Cuts (2019) |

Professional ratings
Aggregate scores
| Source | Rating |
|---|---|
| Metacritic | 82/100 |
Review scores
| Source | Rating |
| AllMusic | 4/5 stars |
| Blurt | 4/5 stars |
| Exclaim! | 8/10 |
| MusicOMH | 4/5 stars |
| PopMatters | 9/10 |

Songs You Make at Night is the sixth studio album from English band Tunng. It was released on 24 August 2018 under Full Time Hobby.

== Critical reception ==
Songs You Make at Night was met with "universal acclaim" reviews from critics. At Metacritic, which assigns a weighted average rating out of 100 to reviews from mainstream publications, this release received an average score of 82 based on 10 reviews. Aggregator Album of the Year gave the release a 77 out of 100 based on a critical consensus of 11 reviews.

== Track listing ==
| No. | Title | Length |
|---|---|---|
| 1. | "Dream In" | 4:39 |
| 2. | "ABOP" | 4:33 |
| 3. | "Sleepwalking" | 3:45 |
| 4. | "Crow" | 3:45 |
| 5. | "Dark Heart" | 4:15 |
| 6. | "Battlefront" | 2:56 |
| 7. | "Flatland" | 3:31 |
| 8. | "Nobody Here" | 5:31 |
| 9. | "Evaporate" | 2:55 |
| 10. | "Like Water" | 4:35 |
| 11. | "Dream Out" | 1:57 |

"ABOP" contains a sample of Mary Millington

== Charts ==
| Chart (2018) | Peak position |
|---|---|
| Scottish Albums (OCC) | 69 |
