= Good Arrows =

Studio album by Tunng
- Released: 27 August 2007
- Recorded: 2006
- Genre: Folktronica
- Length: 42:54
- Label: Full Time Hobby FTH040; Thrill Jockey
- Producer: Mike Lindsay

Tunng chronology
Comments of the Inner Chorus (2006)	Good Arrows (2007)	...And Then We Saw Land (2010)

Professional ratings
Aggregate scores
Source	Rating
Metacritic	75/100 link
Review scores
Source	Rating
AllMusic	link
Drowned in Sound	link
The Guardian	link
NME	link
Pitchfork	(5.9/10) link
PopMatters	link
Stylus	B+ link

Good Arrows is the English band Tunng's third album, released in August 2007 on Full Time Hobby in the UK and Thrill Jockey in the U.S. and Canada.

A limited-edition version of the album was also released which contained two extra tracks: "Wood" and "Clump".

== Track listing ==
1. "Take" (Sam Genders, Tunng) – 3:24
2. "Bricks" (Genders, Tunng) – 4:19
3. "Hands" (Genders, Tunng) – 3:40
4. "Bullets" (Genders, Tunng) – 5:58
5. "Soup" (Mike Lindsay, Tunng) – 3:32
6. "Spoons" (Lindsay, Tunng) – 1:58
7. "King" (Ben Bickerton, Tunng) – 3:06
8. "Arms" (Genders, Tunng) – 5:16
9. "Secrets" (Genders, Lindsay, Tunng) – 3:31
10. "String" (Genders, Becky Jacobs, Tunng) – 2:44
11. "Cans" (Genders, Phil Winter, Tunng) – 5:26
12. "Wood" [extra track on limited CD] – 4:46
13. "Clump" [extra track on limited CD] – 4:31
