= Dana Gavanski =

Canadian singer-songwriter

Background information
- Born: Vancouver, British Columbia, Canada
- Genres: Indie folk, folk pop, art rock
- Occupation: Singer-songwriter
- Instrument: Guitar
- Years active: 2017–present
- Labels: Full Time Hobby, Ba Da Bing Records, Flemish Eye
- Members: James Howard; David B. Miller; Thomas Broda; Dimi Ntontis
- Website: https://www.danagavanski.co.uk/

Dana Gavanski is a Canadian singer-songwriter resident in the UK. Her first record was released in 2017; she is currently signed to Full Time Hobby.

== Biography ==
She was born in Vancouver, British Columbia, Canada, of Serbian descent.

== Career ==
Gavanski had considered following her father Ogden into the film industry. After developing her music for a year she released her first EP, Spring Demos, in 2017 via Fox Food Records.

In 2019 Gavanski released two singles, "One by One" and "Catch"; both were co-produced by Mike Lindsay of Tunng.

Gavanski recorded two sessions for BBC Radio 6 Music's Marc Riley show in 2019. In early 2020, Gavanski supported Damien Jurado on his European tour.

On 27 March 2020, Gavanski released her debut full-length album, Yesterday Is Gone. Exclaim! music magazine, which had declared Gavanski as one of "eight emerging Canadian artists you should hear," awarded the album 9/10. Music website Monkeybiz described the album as "a beautiful work of art". BBC Radio 6 Music made Yesterday Is Gone its album of the week.

The tour to promote Yesterday Is Gone was postponed, initially until later in 2020 and subsequently until 2021 due to the COVID-19 pandemic.

On 5 June 2020, Gavanski released a cover version of King Crimson's "I Talk to the Wind" with proceeds donated to charity. On 14 August 2020 she released Wind Songs, an EP composed of four cover versions and a traditional Macedonian folk song.

== Discography ==
=== Studio albums ===
- Yesterday Is Gone (2020, Full Time Hobby)
- When It Comes (2022, Full Time Hobby)
- Late Slap (2024, Full Time Hobby)

=== Singles ===
- "Catch" (2019, Full Time Hobby)
- "One by One" (2019, Full Time Hobby)
- "I Talk to the Wind" (2020, digital only)
- "How to Feel Uncomfortable" (2024, Full Time Hobby)

=== EPs ===
- Spring Demos (2017, Fox Food Records)
- Wind Songs (2020, Full Time Hobby)
- Bouncing Ball (2022, Full Time Hobby)
- Again Again (2025, Full Time Hobby)

=== Other ===
- Split 12" (2019, Song, by Toad)
