= The Climbers (band) =

British band

Background information
- Origin: Brighton and London, England
- Genres: Folk, pop, rock
- Spinoff of: The Leisure Society
- Members: Tim West; Nick Hemming; Christian Hardy many more

The Climbers is a British band, formed by Nick Hemming and Christian Hardy of The Leisure Society with their childhood friend, Tim West. West introduced Hemming and Hardy to one another and for a period the three lived together in South London.

Though formation of The Climbers predates The Leisure Society, their debut album The Good Ship was not released until May 2010. The album took over six years to make, and was recorded predominantly in hired cottages in Wales and Devon with additional sessions in South London, Brighton, Burton-On-Trent and Northumberland. It received mostly positive reviews, including 5/5 in The Sun, 8/10 in Clash and 8/10 on The 405. Their debut single, also titled "The Good Ship", received extensive support from radio DJs Bob Harris, Jon Richardson, Elbow's Guy Garvey and Marc Riley, who called it "Breathtaking, remarkable, really really amazing."

The band is a part of the Willkommen Collective, featuring members of The Leisure Society, Sons of Noel and Adrian, The Miserable Rich and many more. The album also features guest vocals from Sharon Lewis of Pooka, Dan Michaelson of Absentee and Dan Michaelson & The Coastguards. The band have also recorded with Alessi Laurent-Marke of Alessi's Ark.

The band is something of a studio 'supergroup' and rarely performs live due to the touring commitments of the members with various other bands. However, the band played as part of the Willkommen Orchestra at King's Place in London and the Unitarian Church in Brighton in February 2010, as well as recording a 6Music session for Marc Riley. In July 2010, the band travel to Latvia to play at the Positivus Festival.
