= Miranda Stone =

Canadian singer-songwriter

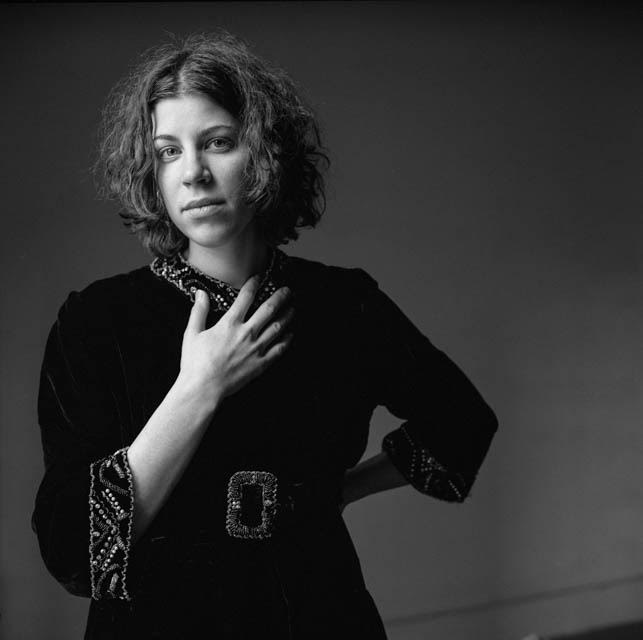
- Miranda Stone.

Background information
- Origin: Niagara-on-the-Lake, Ontario region
- Genres: Canadian folk, folk rock
- Instrument: Acoustic guitar
- Years active: 1997–present
- Label: Earthdress
- Website: www.mirandastone.com

Miranda Stone is a Canadian singer-songwriter originating from the Niagara-on-the-Lake, Ontario region and currently based in Toronto where she operates independent record label Earthdress Productions.

The title track of her album Seven Deadly Sins won the 2004 songwriting prize of the Ontario Council of Folk Festivals.

As of 2003 she had sold more than 10,000 copies of her first two discs.

Her paintings were among those on display at the Riverdale Art Walk, Toronto in June 2005.

During her career, she has toured in Canada, India and the United States. She is married to Chris Hale of Aradhna.

== Discography ==
- Brave (1997)
- 1,2, Trash a Few, 99, 100 (1999)
- 7 Deadly Sins (2002)
