= Aidan Knight =

Canadian singer-songwriter

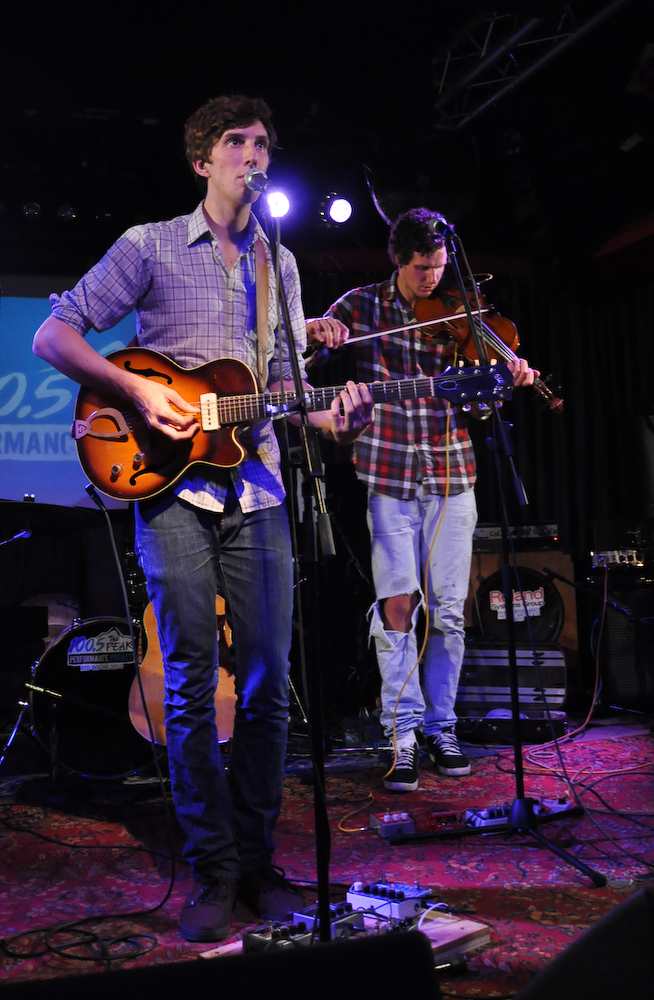

Background information
- Born: October 23, 1986 (age 40); Victoria, British Columbia, Canada
- Genres: Folk, experimental, indie rock
- Occupations: Singer, songwriter, producer, multi-instrumentalist
- Instruments: Guitar, bass, piano
- Years active: 2008–present
- Labels: Full Time Hobby, Adventure Boys Club
- Website: www.aidanknight.com

Aidan Knight (born October 23, 1986) is a Canadian singer-songwriter from Victoria, British Columbia. He has also performed and recorded with The Zolas, Hannah Georgas, Dan Mangan, Karkwa, Jeremy Fisher, and We Are the City. Knight has released four studio albums and toured internationally.

== Career ==
Knight grew up in Victoria, British Columbia where his parents owned a second hand store. Prior to forming his own musical project in 2008, Knight featured with several local bands and also recorded and performed with Hannah Georgas, The Zolas, Dan Mangan, Karkwa, Jeremy Fisher, We Are the City, and David Vertesi.

Knight helped establish the record label Adventure Boys Club, with founder Tyler Bancroft of the band Said the Whale. Its first release was Knight's debut album, Versicolour, on March 2, 2010. Previous digital EPs include Hi There and First Takes, a collection of demos and field recordings from 2007–2008. Versicolour was recorded in Langley at Buena Vista over the course of two years with producer Jonathan Anderson. In 2012, the album Small Reveal appeared.

Each Other, released on January 22, 2016, was created despite several obstacles including his bassist's health issues and his drummer leaving to finish school. In an interview with Transverso Media, Knight explained the struggles, saying, "I think it just mostly affected my sort of - how to put it eloquently - just my thoughts on how to keep going, you know, whatever the future was going to look like. And that seems really dramatic for me to say that now, but at the time it really felt like, 'Oh, maybe I just kind of hang up the towel here.' We had already spent the time and already spent the money on recording it so we would have needed a bunch more money to produce the songs and release the record and all, so maybe we cut out losses?"

On August 28, 2020, Aidan Knight released his self-titled fourth studio album on the indie label Full Time Hobby.

== Discography ==
=== Studio albums ===
- Versicolour (March 2, 2010)
- Small Reveal (October 23, 2012)
- Each Other (January 22, 2016)
- Aidan Knight (August 28, 2020)

=== EPs ===
- First Takes (August 12, 2008)
- Hi There (October 16, 2008)
- Friendly Fires (November 30, 2010)
