= Nick Hemming =

- Hemming performing with Shoreline at 2008's The Big Chill

Background information
- Born: Nicholas Hemming
- Origin: Burton upon Trent, East Staffordshire, England
- Genres: Indie
- Occupation: Musician
- Instrument: Guitar
- Years active: 1991–present

Nicholas Hemming is an English musician and guitarist. He was formerly of the early 1990s indie band She Talks to Angels, is a key musician in the Willkommen Collective, and is currently the lead singer for The Leisure Society. Hemming also plays banjo and mandolin with Sons of Noel and Adrian and with Shoreline.

Hemming wrote and performed music for the films A Room for Romeo Brass (1999), Dead Man's Shoes (2004), and "Tyrannosaur" (2011).

He penned The Leisure Society's debut single "The Last of the Melting Snow", receiving critical and public acclaim and extensive radio play on Zane Lowe's BBC Radio 1 show, Marc Riley's BBC Radio 6 Music show, Lauren Laverne's 6 Music show and Mark Radcliffe and Stuart Maconie's BBC Radio 2 show, where they were voted 'Record of the Week' by listeners, with a record 90% of the vote. The track has also been championed by Elbow frontman Guy Garvey, who named it his favourite song of 2008. The song was nominated for an Ivor Novello Award.

In 2010 Hemming was again nominated for an Ivor Novello Award – one of few people to receive consecutive nominations for Best Song Musically & Lyrically – for the Leisure Society's third single, "Save it For Someone Who Cares".

Hemming also plays with The Climbers, alongside The Leisure Society's Christian Hardy and their childhood friend Tim West, and co-wrote some songs on their debut album The Good Ship, released in May 2010.
