= DJ Derek =

English DJ (1941–2015)

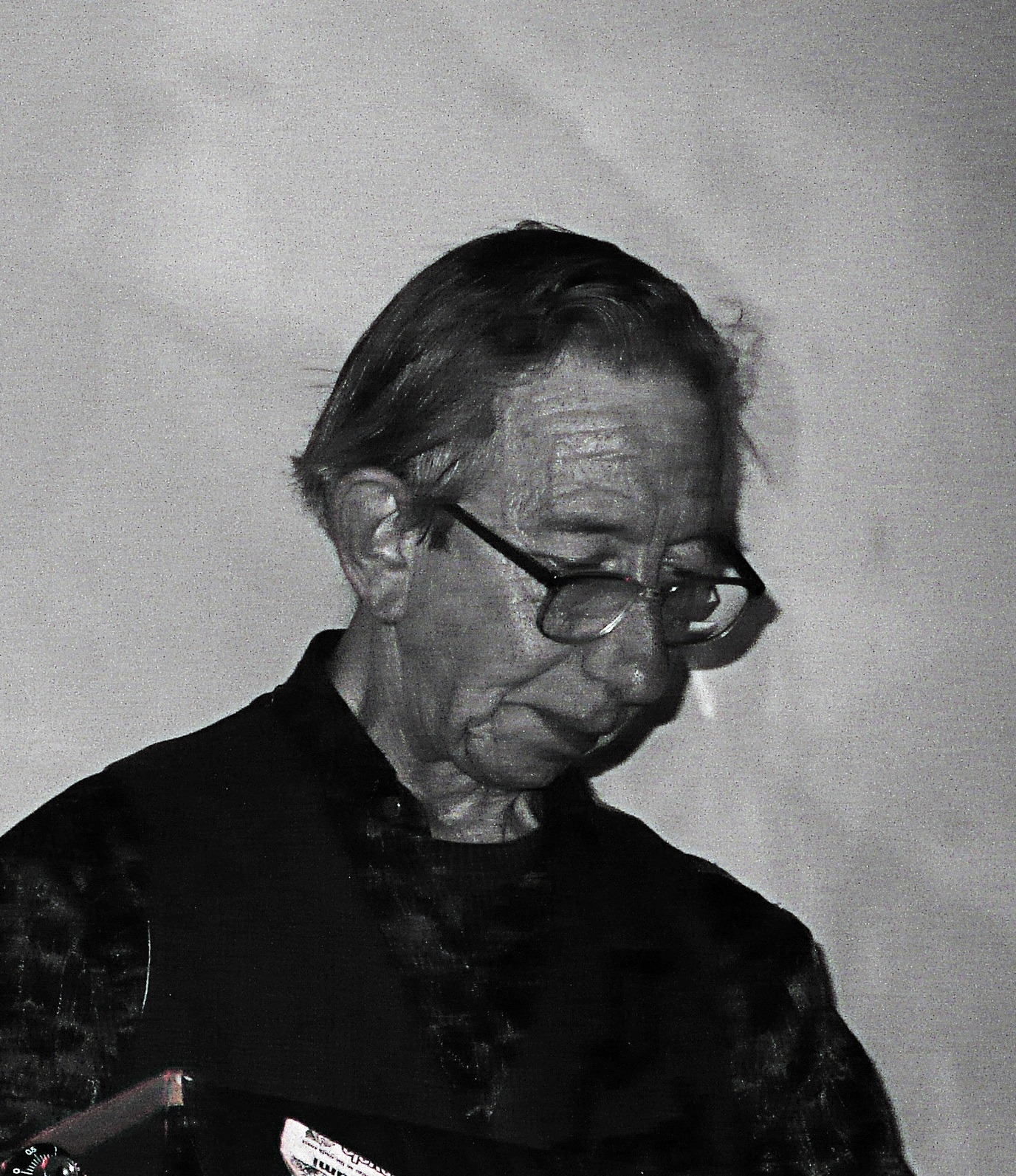
- DJ Derek in 2007

Background information
- Born: Derek Serpell-Morris; 18 December 1941; Bristol, England
- Died: c. July 2015 (aged 73)
- Genres: Rocksteady; reggae; ska; dancehall; soul
- Years active: 1977–2013

DJ Derek, born Derek Serpell-Morris (18 December 1941 – July 2015) was an English DJ based in Bristol. In a DJ career that spanned over 40 years, he was known for playing a blend of 60s rocksteady, reggae, ska, dancehall and soul. He was reported missing in July 2015 and his remains were found on 10 March 2016.

== Early life ==
He was born in Bristol, the second son of a carpenter, and raised close to St Andrew's Park, off Gloucester Road. Derek was a washboard player in a skiffle group in 1956 and later a drummer in a rock and roll band, after which he spent 10–18 years working in the accounts department of the confectionery firm J. S. Fry & Sons, later part of Cadbury.

== DJ career ==
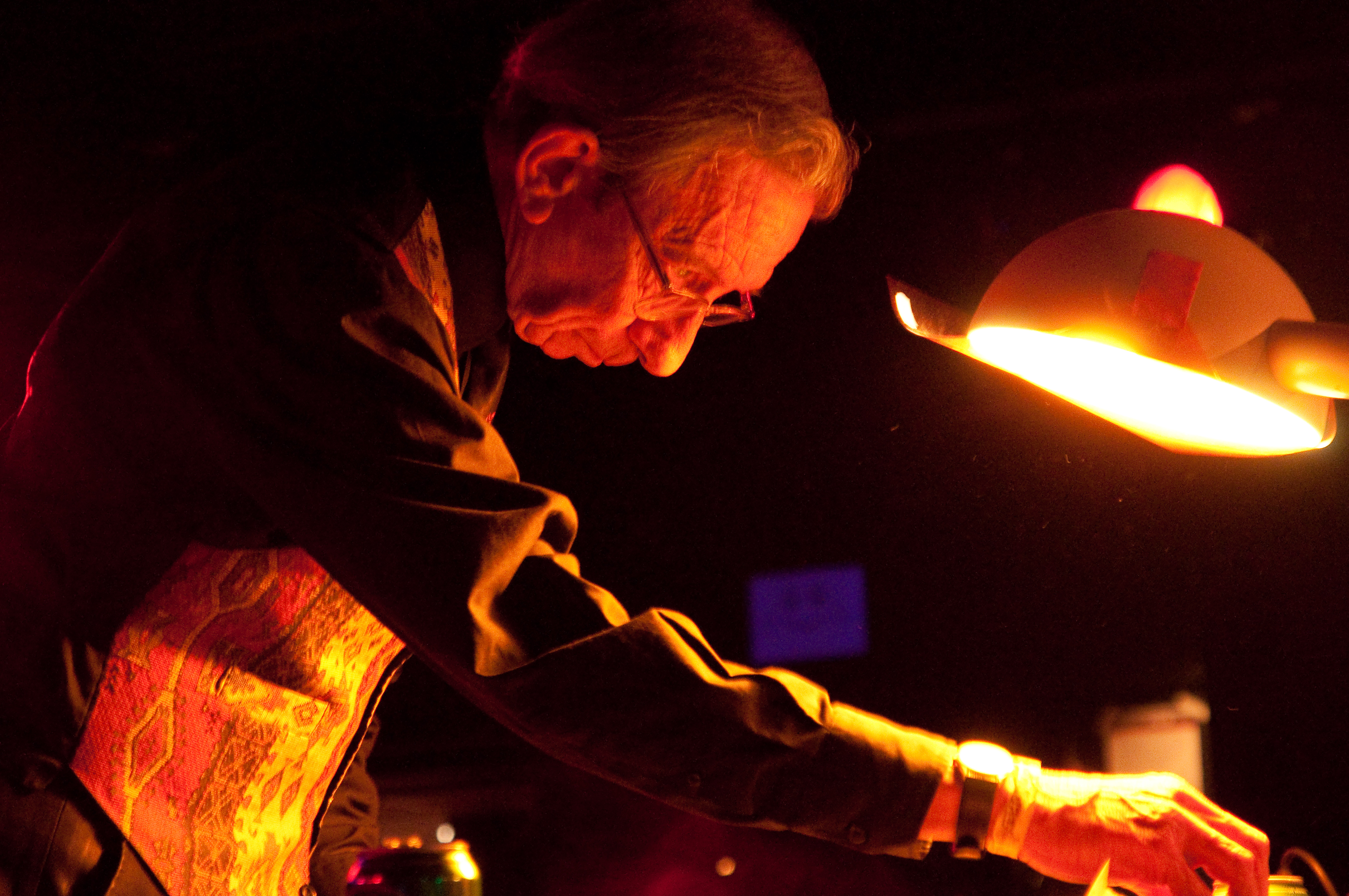
DJ Derek at into The Great Wide Open, September 2009

Following his second divorce and resignation from his accountancy job in 1977, Derek began his DJ career "by accident" in his mid-30s, as a reggae DJ at the Star and Garter pub in Montpelier an inner city area of Bristol. He moved to the adjacent St Pauls area in 1978. DJ Derek became a well known regular and respected feature in Bristol's music scene, referred to as a "legend" by many sources including the city's elected mayor George Ferguson. He was nicknamed "Britain's oldest DJ". In 2012 he received the Bristol Lord Mayor's medal for an "outstanding" contribution to music in the city. Speaking to BBC Radio 4, he said he finished most sets with the Bob Marley hit "One Love", saying "It's a perfect signing-off record for a reggae set—let's get together and feel all right. So next time, people, let's get together and feel all right." He MCed in Jamaican Patois while DJing.

Derek played DJ sets at many major music festivals, including Glastonbury and The Big Chill, and places like Las Palmas (Gran Canaria); as well as regular DJ sets in London and across the UK. In June 2006 he released a compilation of his favourite tracks titled DJ Derek Presents Sweet Memory Sounds, through Trojan Records. He appeared in Dizzee Rascal's video for "Dirtee Disco". In 2013 he played his final set before retiring at Notting Hill Arts Club in London on New Year's Eve, though he later played a one-off show in December 2014. He had a passion for travelling long distances by bus to visit newly opened Wetherspoon pubs .

== Disappearance ==
In July 2015, Derek's family announced that he had been missing for three weeks, appealing for information related to his whereabouts. Police confirmed that he had not used his bank account since the beginning of July, and could not have gone abroad as he had no passport. He was last seen leaving the Criterion pub in St Pauls shortly after midnight on 11 July; later that morning his bus pass was used on a bus to Thornbury, 12 miles (19 km) north of Bristol. Daddy G of Massive Attack, who described Derek as a "walking musical encyclopedia", played a club night in Bristol to raise funds for a search.

In December 2015, Derek's family said that a man matching his description had been seen fleeing a pub in Thornbury following an altercation; Avon and Somerset Police said that their investigations into his disappearance were continuing. Later in December, an image taken in London of a man resembling Derek was publicised. While his family noted an "uncanny" resemblance, Avon and Somerset Police later announced that they had located and spoken to the man photographed, and confirmed that he was not Derek. Derek's family began an application for presumed death in March 2016.

On 10 March 2016, human remains were found in undergrowth near The Mall, Cribbs Causeway, Bristol, and on 16 March, were confirmed to be those of DJ Derek. Shortly after his remains were discovered, Bristol police said they were not treating his death as suspicious.

== Tributes ==
During the 6 Music festival hosted by the BBC in Bristol in February 2016, Don Letts and Daddy G premiered a snippet of a documentary they had been working on before his disappearance. Letts said they planned to complete the film as a mark of respect, as they had halted further production until his whereabouts were revealed. In March 2016, Bristol pub The Farm in St Werburghs, one of Derek's regular haunts, revealed they were hosting an auction to raise funds for a mural near his home. On 1 April, contributions from Banksy, Fatboy Slim, Stanley Donwood and other local artists helped to raise over £5000 (US$6,905) towards the fund. Mayor George Ferguson revealed plans for a city tribute to him, with an official announcement to follow.

== See also ==
- List of solved missing person cases (2010s)
