= Eyes & No Eyes =

British band

- Genres: Folk rock
- Labels: Willkommen Collective
- Website: www.willkommenrecords.co.uk/artists/eyes-and-no-eyes

Eyes & No Eyes is a folk rock band from Brighton and Hove, England. Their self-titled debut album, released in 2014 by Willkommen Collective, was credited to band members Tristram Bawtree, Marcus Hamblett, Thomas Heather, and Becca Mears.

== Discography ==
=== Albums ===
- Eyes & No Eyes (Willkommen, 2014) – feat. Woodpecker Wooliams

=== Singles ===
- "If No One Else Saw It" (2013, Willkommen)
- "Autocrat" (2014, Willkommen)
- "Extinction" (2017)
