= Bussetti =

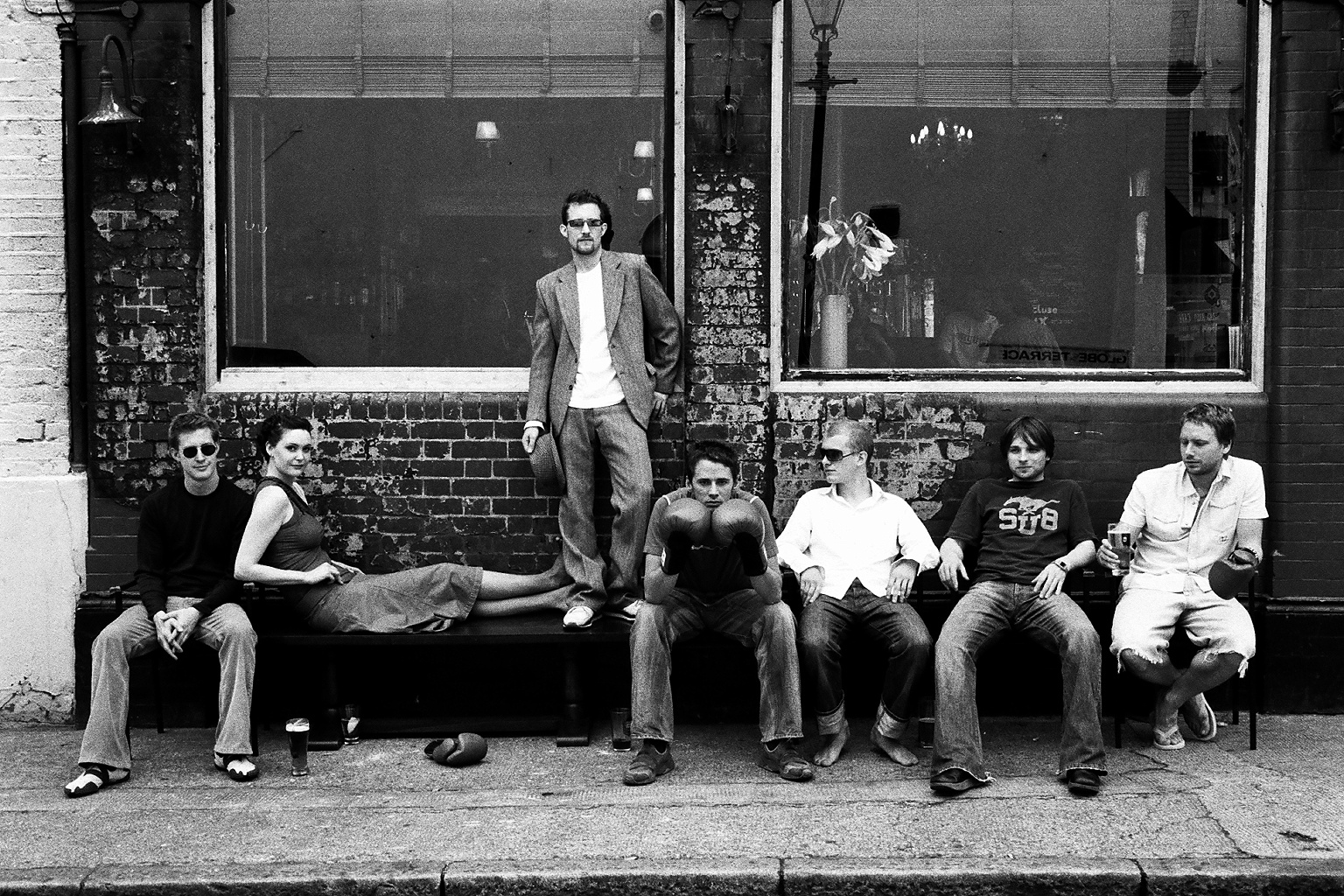
Bussetti in 2004

Bussetti was a London-based band who were active between 2001 and 2007. Their style was a mish-mash of genres, including hip-hop, funk, jazz, indie and pop.

During their career, as well as playing at venues all over the UK, they performed at several music festivals, including the 2003 and 2006 Big Chill festivals, and the 2004 Dour Festival in Belgium.

They released two 12" singles, Softly (2003) and The Itch/Debussetti (2004) and an album – Where Have You Been (2007).

Their work has been remixed by artists such as Four Tet and Xploding Plastix.

They split up in June 2007.

== History ==
Bussetti were formed in 2001 in London by a group of musicians who had all met at university. They named themselves after the former landlord of two of the band, who was subsequently murdered in 2002. Their early influences were Lamb, Red Snapper and The Cinematic Orchestra.

They had a varied line-up (see below), and performed regularly in London and around the UK.

== Discography ==
=== Softly ===
The band's début 12" single, Softly, featured a remix by Four Tet, plus instrumental and a capella versions. Produced by band members Dan Edge and Henry Scowcroft, it was recorded at the Premises studios in Hackney, London, in 2003, and released on the band's own (now-defunct) label, Realise Records.

- A1: Softly
- A2: Softly (instrumental)
- B1: Softly (Four Tet remix)
- B2: Softly (a capella)

=== The Itch/Debussetti ===
Their second single was a 'double-A' side, featuring tracks The Itch and Debussetti. It was also released on Realise Records.

- A1 The Itch
- A2 The Itch (radio edit)
- B1 Debussetti
- B2 Debussetti (radio edit)

=== The Story So Far ===
Prior to the release of Where Have You Been (see below), the band pulled together all their material to date and released it as a free CD, given out at gigs. The track listing was:

1. Spanish Jake
2. Nings
3. The Itch
4. Debussetti
5. Diskaplin (live)
6. Debussetti (Xploding Plastix remix)
7. The Itch (King Seven remix)
8. Debussetti (Deckshufflers remix)
9. Softly (Four Tet remix)
10. Jon Kennedy – Useless Wooden Toys (Bussetti remix)
11. Verbrilli Sound – Honey Czars (Bussetti remix)

=== Where Have You Been ===
In 2007, the band released a full-length CD album, Where Have You Been. Produced by the band, and mixed and mastered by Ben Spektor, it was recorded at various locations including The Premises in London, and featured guest appearances by double bassists Tim Pharaoh and Omri Chetrit, and session percussionist Preston Heyman.

The track listing was:

1. Singasong
2. Spanish Jake
3. Softly
4. The Itch
5. The Scratch
6. Words
7. Nings
8. Song with 3 Names
9. Not From Round Here
10. Debussetti

The album was released at Bussetti's farewell gig, at the Luminaire in London, on 9 June 2007. It can currently be streamed from SoundCloud.

=== Other material ===
Bussetti contributed mixes to Ninja Tune's Solid Steel radio show, and did remixes for Canadian Downtempo artist Verbrilli Sound and UK musician Jon Kennedy.

They placed a collection of remixes done for the band, together with unreleased live and instrumental tracks, on SoundCloud.

In December 2011, their single Debussetti was featured by Tom Robinson on BBC6 Music's Introducing show.

== Line-up ==
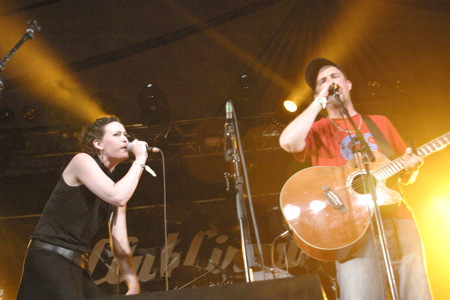
Charlie Miller and Jana Hermon front Bussetti at the 2004 Dour festival

The live band revolved around a core of five, supplemented by various others. The initial line-up was:

- Jana Hermon – vocals
- Charlie Miller – vocals, guitar, saxophone
- Jez Humble – synthesizer
- Daniel Edge – keyboards
- Oli Bird – drums
- Henry Scowcroft – bass
- Susannah Price – cello

Prior to the departure of Humble and Price, the band was joined by saxophonist Nick Atkins and scratch DJ Nick Flugge. In 2005, drummer Oli Bird moved to LA and was replaced by Dor Kelman. In later years, trombophonist Jamie Fagg, harp/clarinetist Kat Arney, synth player Rui Teimao, and VJ Mark van der Vord played with the band. For their final live appearance at London's Luminare in June 2007, their line-up was:

- Jana Hermon – vocals
- Charlie Miller – vocals, guitar, alto saxophone
- Daniel Edge – keyboards/harmonium
- Rui Teimao – synthesizer
- Dor Kelman – Drums
- Jamie Fagg – trombone
- Nick Atkins – soprano/tenor saxophone
- Kat Arney – Harp/bass clarinet
- Henry Scowcroft – bass/guitar
- Mark van der Vord – visuals
