= Mother's Daughter and Other Songs =

Studio album by Tunng
- Released: January 10, 2005
- Genre: Folktronica
- Length: 39:44
- Label: Static Caravan VAN88
- Producer: Mike Lindsay, Sam Genders

Tunng chronology
Mother's Daughter and Other Songs (2005)	Comments of the Inner Chorus (2006)

Professional ratings
Review scores
Source	Rating
AllMusic	3.5/5 stars
The Guardian	3/5 stars
Pitchfork Media	(6.5/10)

Mother's Daughter and Other Songs is the debut album by Tunng, released in 2005. The track "Tale from Black" featured at number 37 in the 2004 Festive Fifty.

== Track listing ==
1. "Mother's Daughter" – 3:24
2. "People Folk" – 4:09
3. "Out the Window with the Window" – 3:20
4. "Beautiful and Light" – 4:11
5. "Tale from Black" – 5:35
6. "Song of the Sea" – 3:54
7. "Kinky Vans" – 5:11
8. "Fair Doreen" – 1:43
9. "Code Breaker" – 3:09
10. "Surprise Me 44" – 5:08
