= Sons of Noel and Adrian =

Experimental band based in Brighton, England

- Origin: Brighton, England
- Genres: Alternative, folk, experimental
- Years active: 2008–present
- Labels: Broken Sound, Willkommen Records, OIB Records, Shelsmusic
- Members: Jacob Richardson, William Calderbank, Marcus Hamblett, Alistair Strachan, Cathy Cardin, Patrick Lawrence, Emma Gatrill, Jools Owen
- Past members: Rowan Coupland, Nick Hemming, Mike Siddell, Helen Whitaker, Jo White, Tom Cowan, Daniel Green, Tom Heather

Sons of Noel and Adrian are an experimental band based in Brighton, England. They are known for their live performances with up to thirteen musicians on stage, all of whom play with many other bands. They are one of the founding groups of the Willkommen Collective.

== History ==
The band's debut self-titled album was released worldwide in April 2010 (distributed by Shellshock), coinciding with a seven date tour of Germany and ten date tour of the UK. It features the likes of Nick Hemming from The Leisure Society on banjo and mandolin, Mike Siddell from Hope of the States and Lightspeed Champion on the violin and Will Calderbank from The Miserable Rich on the cello. Critics described the album as a more orchestral take on the American nu-folk movement, as "equal parts Shostakovich and Will Oldham".

The lead single 'The Wreck is Not a Boat' received airplay on BBC Radio 1 and BBC 6 Music from Rob Da Bank, Gideon Coe and more.

The band then toured the UK twice with friends Mumford & Sons and gigged extensively, performing with the likes of David Grubbs, Peggy Sue, Red Sparowes, Rothko, David Thomas Broughton and Alessi's Ark.

In 2009 the band played several high-profile London shows: the Royal Festival Hall with Laura Marling, the Barbican with Jaga Jazzist and Efterklang with the Britten Sinfonia, the Union Chapel with The Leisure Society and The Roundhouse, performing a live score for Antonin Artaud's La Coquille et le clergyman. Marcus Mumford of Mumford & Sons joined the band on stage for their performance of "Indigo", playing drums and singing. This performance can be seen on the live bonus DVD with the special edition of Laura Marling's second album, I Speak Because I Can.

The band went on to release the Rivers EP as a 7" on OIB Records and play many festivals including End of the Road Festival, The Big Chill and Green Man.

In April 2011 the band completed a twelve date tour of Europe and announced via Facebook that they had completed recording their second album, titled Knots. In March 2012, Broken Sound and Willkommen Records confirmed the album's title and announced a release date of 21 May 2012 supported by a short UK tour.

The band members are noted for being extremely collaborative. As well as almost every member of the band having a solo project, and all of them collaborating with other musicians from within the Willkommen Collective, in 2011 two members performed some shows with Damo Suzuki of krautrock band Can and two performed as the horn section for Broken Social Scene's tour of the UK. In 2012 four members of the band performed as part of Laura Marling's band on the Pyramid stage at Glastonbury festival and featured on her album Live at York Minster.

Their second album, Knots, was released in 2012. Critics noted a marked departure from the debut, exploring and combining a wider array of genres, especially the "influence of Chicago's avant-garde rock and jazz scene and guitarists such as former Slint-man David Pajo in particular".

The band's third album, Turquoise Purple Pink, was released on 25 November 2016. The album marked another change in style - after hearing the new material at Green Man Festival, Kathryn Bromwich of The Observer wrote, "In the front: two girls doing Cocteau Twins-like ethereal vocals and faultlessly choreographed dance moves, occasionally breaking off for a drum or clarinet solo. In the back: the band (three on guitar and bass, two drummers) blast out funky basslines, building crescendo and noise levels that would make My Bloody Valentine proud." The Quietus described the new material as "a defiantly electric brand of muscular jazz-rock that recalls the acceptable face of early seventies prog; Soft Machine, later Traffic and the 'Rock In Opposition' movement, somewhere between Henry Cow and Magma." Tom Robinson premiered the track, "I Love You So Much I Want To Stab You In The Eye", on his BBC Radio 6 Music show on 31 October 2016. The band did a five date tour of Germany then went on Tom Robinson's show to perform a four track live session on Saturday 4 March 2017. Stuart Maconie replayed one of the live tracks on his Freak Zone show on Sunday 9 April 2017.

== Discography ==
=== Studio albums ===
- Sons of Noel and Adrian (2008)
- Knots (2012)
- Turquoise Purple Pink (2016)

=== Other releases ===
- The Wreck Is Not A Boat (2009) – EP
- Rivers (2010) – 7"
- Your Tunnel That Connects My Arm to a God-Fearing Woman Who Lives in the Dark (2012) – compilation of rarities
