= The Sleeper (album) =

Studio album by The Leisure Society
- Released: 30 March 2009
- Genre: Folk-pop
- Length: 38:53
- Label: Willkommen

The Leisure Society chronology
The Sleeper (2009)	Into the Murky Water (2011)

The Sleeper is the first studio album by English indie folk band The Leisure Society.

Their self-produced debut album, The Sleeper was initially released on 30 March 2009 on Willkommen Records. It received lavish critical praise, being named a Rough Trade album of 2009.

The first single from the album, "The Last of the Melting Snow'", was released on 15 December 2008 and has received extensive radio play on Zane Lowe's Radio 1 show, Marc Riley's BBC 6 Music show Lauren Laverne's 6 Music show and Mark Radcliffe and Stuart Maconie's Radio 2 show, where they were voted 'Record of the Week' by listeners with a record 90% of the vote. Marc Riley also invited them to perform a live session for 6music on 15 December and Mark Radcliffe tipped the single as a candidate for a left field Christmas number one. Guy Garvey named the song his favourite of 2008 and has been a vocal supporter of The Leisure Society continually since then. "The Last of the Melting Snow" received a nomination in the Ivor Novello Awards 2009 for Best Song Musically/Lyrically, competing against Elbow and The Last Shadow Puppets. Hemming told The Times that he "spent New Year's Eve sitting on the floor with a bottle of vodka, writing 'The Last of the Melting Snow'" after breaking up with his girlfriend.

The second single from The Sleeper is entitled "A Matter of Time" and was released on 16 March. The band were invited to perform live sessions on both Radcliffe & Maconie (where the song was once again voted 'Record of The Week' by listeners) and Dermot O'Leary's Radio 2 shows.

After having signed to Full Time Hobby, the band re-released The Sleeper with a bonus EP containing 8 additional recordings, comprising unreleased demos, B-sides and new recordings, including a cover of "Cars" by Gary Numan and a new single version of "Save It For Someone Who Cares". A session for Dermot O'Leary was recorded on 14 September 2009.

== Track listing ==
No.	Title	Length
1.	"A Fighting Chance"	3:32
2.	"The Sleeper"	3:50
3.	"The Last of the Melting Snow"	3:33
4.	"A Short Weekend Begins with Longing"	3:17
5.	"We Were Wasted"	2:55
6.	"Save It for Someone Who Cares"	4:01
7.	"The Darkest Place I Know"	3:49
8.	"Are We Happy?"	2:54
9.	"Come to Your Senses"	2:31
10.	"A Matter of Time"	6:02
11.	"Love's Enormous Wings"	2:31
