= Into the Murky Water =

Studio album by The Leisure Society
- Released: 2 May 2011
- Genre: Folk-pop
- Label: Full Time Hobby

The Leisure Society chronology
The Sleeper (2009)	Into the Murky Water (2011)	Alone Aboard the Ark (2013)

Professional ratings
Aggregate scores
Source	Rating
Metacritic	65/100
Review scores
Source	Rating
AllMusic	3.5/5 stars
Drowned in Sound	8/10
The Guardian	3/5 stars
NME	3/5 stars

Into the Murky Water is the second full-length studio album from band The Leisure Society, released on 2 May 2011 by independent record label Full Time Hobby.

== Track listing ==
No.	Title	Length
1.	"Into the Murky Water"	3:32
2.	"Dust on the Dancefloor"	3:50
3.	"Our Hearts Burn Like Damp Matches"	3:33
4.	"You Could Keep Me Talking"	3:17
5.	"Although We All Are Lost"	2:55
6.	"This Phantom Life"	4:01
7.	"The Hungry Years"	3:49
8.	"I Shall Forever Remain an Amateur"	2:54
9.	"Better Written Off (Than Written Down)"	2:31
10.	"Just Like The Knife"	6:02
