= The Big Chill (music festival) =

Annual music festival in Herefordshire, UK

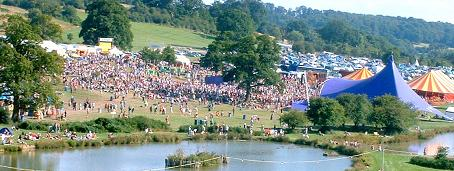
- Genre: Indie, Dance music, World music, Jazz, Reggae, Folk music, Dub music, Ambient, Chillout
- Dates: Early August
- Locations: Ledbury, Herefordshire, England
- Years active: 1994 – 2011
- Founders: Pete Lawrence and Katrina Larkin

The Big Chill was an annual festival of alternative, dance and chill-out music and comedy, held in the grounds of Eastnor Castle during early August. The 2011 line-up included The Chemical Brothers, Kanye West, Rodrigo Y Gabriela, Jessie J, Robert Plant, Calvin Harris, Neneh Cherry, Aloe Blacc, Chipmunk, Katy B & Example. The festival has not been staged since 2011.

== History ==
Founded in 1994 by Pete Lawrence and Katrina Larkin, The Big Chill began as a series of ambient parties at the Union Chapel in Islington, but developed into an outdoor festival in 1995, with an unlicensed event in the Black Mountains of Wales. In the early days the most prominent DJs were Matt Black of Coldcut, Tom Middleton of Global Communication and Mixmaster Morris, also known as the Irresistible Force.

In 1996 the event took place in Norfolk and in 1998 a new home for the event (now known as "The Enchanted Garden") was found at Larmer Tree Gardens in England where it was held for five years. During this time the festival slowly developed its hallmarks, such as high quality visuals, an excellent range of food stalls, highly unusual line-ups and a Body & Soul field with many healers, masseurs and alternative therapists. In 2001 a second summer festival was also held at Lulworth Castle in Dorset. In 2002 the festival moved to Eastnor Castle where it remained until 2011. In 2002 PK Events Limited was liquidated and 50% shares were sold to the Cantaloupe Group, a company that managed a bar chain. A new company, Chillfest Limited, was created, with Katrina Larkin and Pete Lawrence each owning 25% and retaining a controlling management role in the company. The Big Chill staged many events around the world, in locations such as Naxos (Greek islands), Austalasia, Japan, Goa (India) and all over Europe. In 2007, the Cantaloupe Group bought out Pete Lawrence, who left the company, and some of Katrina Larkin's shares, to become the majority shareholder. In 2009, the festival went into liquidation and the brand was bought by Festival Republic. Katrina Larkin moved on to work with Festival Republic as creative director. She handed over creative direction to Festival Republic in 2010.

Throughout its history, The Big Chill showcased a variety of different music, uptempo as well as ambient. Live acts and DJs like Norman Jay, Mr Scruff, Hexstatic, Mixmaster Morris, alucidnation, Laura B, DJ Derek, Leggo Beast and Gilles Peterson were regular performers, but the festival also provided a diverse range of music from folk and jazz to African and dub.

In addition to a widely varied musical line-up, a focus on art, films, poetry, circus, cabaret, comedy and gourmet food all played a key part in setting The Big Chill apart from the competition. The Big Chill saw contributions from and collaborations with many artists and arts bodies, including Johnny Easterby, I Am The Mighty Jungulator Spencer Tunick, Pete Fowler, Gavin Turk, Cedric Christie, Peter Blake, Rankin, Bob & Roberta Smith, Vivienne Westwood, Tate Britain, the British Film Institute, Institute of Contemporary Arts, Bompas & Parr, the Roundhouse, Apples & Snakes, Penguin Books, The World Famous, Film4, and the Art Car Boot Fair.

== Past line-ups ==
Over the years, The Big Chill's line-up has included the following performers and DJs:

1995 Big Chill Gala, Llanthony, Black Mountains, Wales: Nightmares On Wax (DJ set), Global Communication, The Gentle Experience (Gentle People vs Karminsky Experience), Spring Heel Jack, Mixmaster Morris, Matt Black, Another Fine Day.

1996 Big Chill Gala - Hingham, Norfolk: LTJ Bukem, Squarepusher, Mr Scruff, Talvin Singh, Pork Recordings, Zion Train, Autechre, Andrea Parker, Bedouin Ascent, Wishmountain, Earthtribe, Muslimgauze, Sounds From The Ground.

1998 Enchanted Garden, Larmer Tree, Wilts: Instrumental v Mao, Jimpster, Bedouin Ascent, Ian O'Brien, Dego (4 Hero), Rainer Trüby, Michael Reinboth, Robert Miles, London Elektricity, Joi.

1999 Enchanted Garden, Larmer Tree, Wilts: Fila Brazillia, Fridge, BJ Cole and Luke Vibert, Hexstatic, Hefner, Gilles Peterson, Plaid, A Man Called Adam, Roots Manuva, Jazzanova, Paino Circus, Harold Budd, Bollywood Brass Band.

2000 Enchanted Garden, Larmer Tree, Wilts: Amon Tobin, State Of Bengal, Blue States, DJ Food, Norman Jay, The Bays, Amba, Bent, Paper Recordings, Shur-i-Ken, Pork Recordings, Chris Coco

2001 Enchanted Garden, Larmer Tree, Wilts: Zero 7, The Cinematic Orchestra, Kinobe, Goldfrapp, Laura B, Terry Callier, Blu Mar Ten, Spacek, LTJ Bukem, DJ Derek, Richard Norris, Neotropic, Alucidnation, Sidestepper.

2001 Lulworth Castle, Dorset: Kruder & Dorfmeister, Future Sound of London, Phil Asher and Nathan Haines, Mixmaster Morris, Laura B, Landslide, Modaji, Howie B, Herbert, Crazy Penis, Pitch Black, Funky Lowlives.

2002 Enchanted Garden, Larmer Tree, Wilts: Lamb, Badmarsh and Shri, Peshay, Lambchop, Quantic, Lemon Jelly, To Rococo Rot, Pole, DJ Krush, Boomclick, Osymyso, Dominic Glynn (No Bones), Laura B.

2002 Eastnor Castle: Gotan Project, Röyksopp, Plaid, Fila Brazillia, Koop, Maurice Fulton, Gilles Peterson, Hint, Isan, Ulrich Schnauss, Andreas Vollenweider, Laura B, Bola, The Bees, Charles Webster, Jerry Dammers, Jedi Knights.

2003 Eastnor Castle: Nitin Sawhney, John Peel, Trüby Trio, Jaga Jazzist, Boozoo Bajou, Ralph Myerz and the Jack Herren Band, Laura B, Bussetti, François K, Jimi Tenor, Nightmares On Wax, A Guy Called Gerald, Murcof, Amy Winehouse, Dubtribe Sound System, The Wurzels, Dominic Glynn (Cybajaz).

2004 Eastnor Castle: Coldcut, Lemon Jelly, Laura B, Fragile State, Quantic Soul Orchestra, Mylo, Hot Chip, Phil Hartnoll, The Egg, Bonobo, Xpress 2, Adam Freeland, Memory Band, Oi Va Voi, Flipsyde, New Sector Movement, Biosphere, Four Tet, Bugz In The Attic, Bent, Sparky, Dominic Glynn.

2005 Eastnor Castle: The Bays, Mad Professor, Fat Freddy's Drop, The Earlies, Tinariwen, The Necks, Lunz, Robert Fripp, St. Etienne, Ukulele Orchestra of Great Britain, The Rebirth, Youngblood Brass Band, Emiliana Torrini, The Beat, Laura B, Róisín Murphy, The Swingle Singers, Alice Russell, Kate Rusby, Tunng, London Elektricity, Patife and Dynamite MC.

2006 Eastnor Castle: Laura B, Bussetti, José González, Aim, The Heritage Orchestra with Deodato, Amadou and Mariam, Arrested Development, The Proclaimers, Sebastian Tellier, Brian Eno, Lily Allen, Coldcut, Robert Owens, Biggabush, Nathan Fake, Jon Hopkins, Lambchop, Beauty Room, Bellowhead, Jamie Lidell, Vashti Bunyan, A Hawk and a Hacksaw, Lou Rhodes, Neil Cowley Trio, Shri, Bugz In The Attic, Sparks, E.S.T, Digitonal, The Egg, Scritti Politti.

2007 Eastnor Castle: Kruder & Dorfmeister, Mr Scruff, The Cinematic Orchestra, Seasick Steve, The Bad Plus, Richie Havens, The Blockheads, Mr Hudson and The Library, Mixmaster Morris, Faze Action, Laura B, Morgan Geist, Max Hattler, Isaac Hayes, Ojos De Brujo, Skatalites, Paul Hartnoll, Kevin Rowland, John Metcalfe, The Spatial AKA Orchestra, Roedelius, Shlomo, Crazy P, The Go! Team, Hexstatic, Tom Middleton.

2008 Eastnor Castle: Thievery Corporation, Trentmoller, Leonard Cohen, The Mighty Boosh, Bill Bailey, Irresistible Force, The Buzzcocks, Beth Orton, Roots Manuva, Ty, David Holmes, The Orb, Lee "Scratch" Perry, Russell Howard, Flying Lotus, Benga, Derrick Carter, Matthew Herbert Big Band, Laura B, DJ Krush, Hot 8 Brass Band, John Shuttleworth, Jilted John, Fink, Camille.

2009 Eastnor Castle: Basement Jaxx, Orbital, David Byrne, Lamb, Spiritualized, Pharoah Sanders, Amadou & Mariam, Max Romeo, Mulatu Astatke, Chris Cunningham, Josie Long, Tim Minchin, Dylan Moran, Noel Fielding, Russell Howard, Metro Area, Michael Lang, Friendly Fires, Mr Hudson, Chrome Hoof, Calexico, Ashley Beedle, The Field, James Yuill, Todd Terje, Bass Clef, Tomb Crew, Don Letts, Laura B, Bonobo, Justin Robertson, Hypnotic Brass Ensemble, To Rococo Rot, David Shrigley, Norman Jay, Gong, John Cooper Clarke, Mixmaster Morris, Congo Natty, Jazzie B, Keb Darge, Adrian Sherwood, Greg Wilson, DJ Derek, Sparky, Suns of Arqa, Dominic Glynn.

2010 Eastnor Castle: Massive Attack, M.I.A., Lily Allen, Thom Yorke, Roots Manuva, Gregory Isaacs, Explosions In The Sky, Plan B, Tinie Tempah, Bebel Gilberto, Kelis, Roy Ayers, Mike Patton's Mondo Cane, Kruder & Dorfmeister, Layo & Bushwacka!, Magnetic Man, Mr. Scruff, Craig Charles, Mystery Jets, Steve Mason, Chris Coco, Benji B, Liars, Caribou, Mount Kimbie, The Leisure Society, Rye Rye, Riva Starr, Bonobo, Villagers, Henrik Schwarz, Andy Weatherall, Hospital Records, Little Dragon, The Bug, Mad Professor, Joker, Appleblim, Theo Parrish, Greg Wilson, DJ Derek, Tom Middleton, Futureboogie, Alice Russell, The Heavy, Andreya Triana, Funki Porcini, Lol Hammond, Willkommen Collective, Dry The River, Beth Jeans Houghton, Sparky, Dominic Glynn, DāM FunK.

2011 Eastnor Castle: The Chemical Brothers, Kanye West, Rodrigo y Gabriella, Empire of The Sun, Jessie J, Robert Plant & The Band of Joy, Neneh Cherry, Metronomy, Warpaint, Wild Beasts, Bullitts, Femi Kuti & The Positive Force, Norman Jay, Ariel Pink's Haunted Graffiti, Crystal Fighters...

== Festival Site ==
The festival was situated in the grounds of Eastnor Castle near Ledbury in Herefordshire. The grounds are normally used as a reserve for deer. The organisers encouraged a "leave no trace" policy to dissuade people from littering the site. Camping was divided into Red, Blue, Green and Purple areas, as well as Family Camping, Quiet Camping and Accessible Camping.

== Sale to Festival Republic ==
In September 2009, Chillfest Limited - the company responsible for running the festival since 2003 - was placed into voluntary liquidation by its owners. The rights to the festival brand were purchased by Festival Republic. Vantis Plc - the company appointed as liquidators - released a statement blaming poor ticket sales for the 2009 festival as the reason for liquidation.

== Cancellation ==
In early January 2012, the managing director of Festival Republic, Melvin Benn, released a statement outlining that the 2012 festival would not be going ahead:

I looked long and hard late last year at moving the date so it didn't clash with the Olympics but the mix of the festival fans desire to keep the date, and an inability to find an alternative date that works, I plumped for maintaining the existing weekend. Sadly, the artist availability and confirmations we were achieving led me to conclude that I couldn't risk going ahead with the event this year.

— Melvin Benn,

Although there was speculation at the time that a smaller indoor event could see the festivals return in 2013, this was revealed not to be the case the following January when the organisers released a statement informing there were "no plans" for a return that year.

In August 2013 it was again announced that there were "no plans" for a 2014 festival, leading to doubt that the event would return again.

== World record ==
In 2009 Chris Boyle, the filmmaker for the independent film I Spit on Your Rave, collaborated with The Big Chill to break a Guinness World Record for most zombies captured on camera. 4,206 people showed up for the event, breaking the record for any previous gatherings recorded by Guinness. The unreleased film is currently being re-developed as a potential six-part TV series for E4.

== See also ==
- List of electronic music festivals
