= The Leisure Society =

English rock band

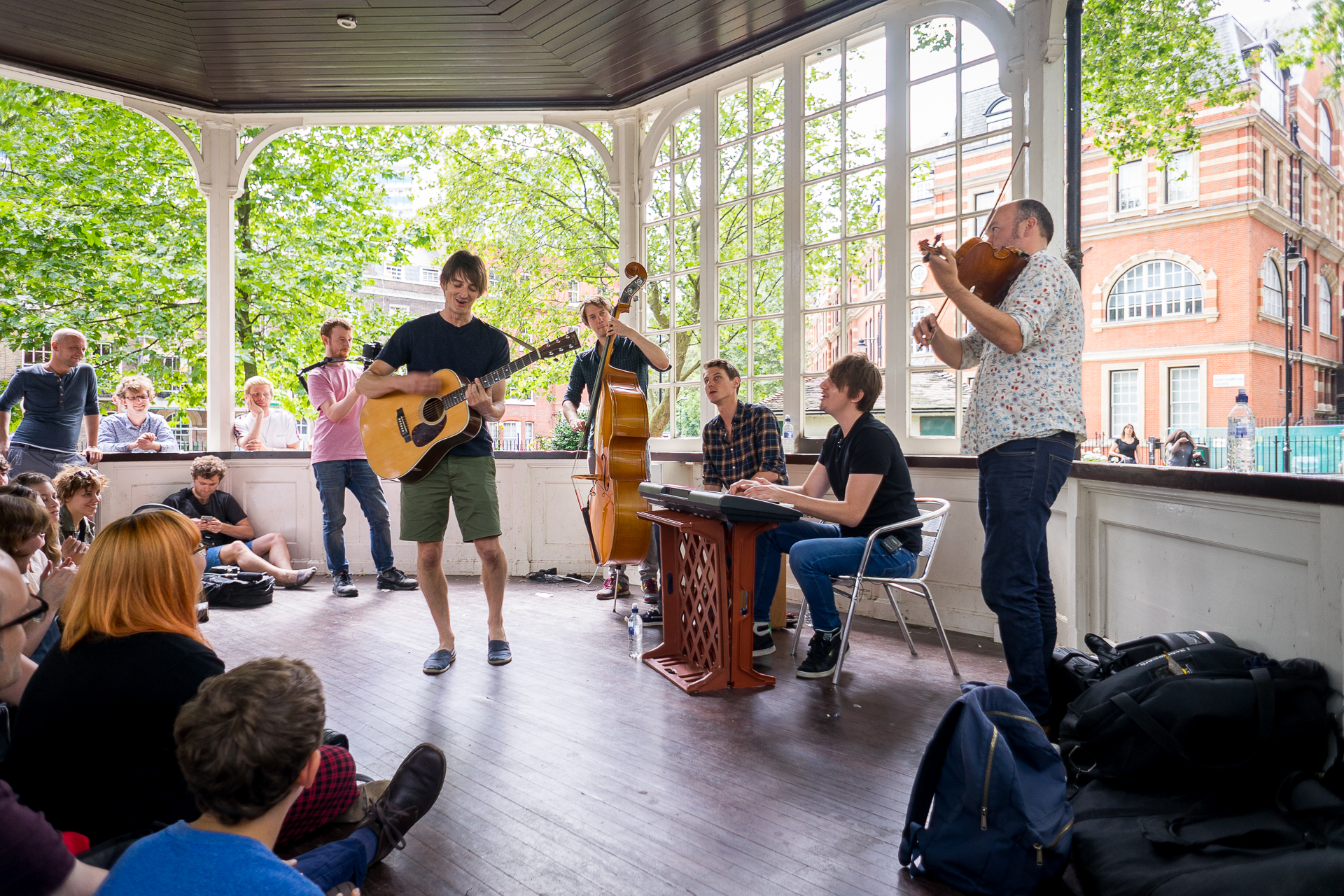

Background information
- Origin: Brighton and London, England
- Genres: Folk, pop, rock
- Years active: 2009–present
- Members: Nick Hemming; Christian Hardy; Mike Siddell; Helen Whitaker; Sebastian Hankins; Jon Cox
- Past members: William Calderbank; Darren Bonehill; Scott Barnum

The Leisure Society are an English rock band from Burton upon Trent formed by Nick Hemming and Christian Hardy of Burton upon Trent.

== History ==
Hemming was formerly of early 1990s indie band She Talks to Angels, which included actor Paddy Considine, and film director Shane Meadows. The band is not to be confused with the song of the same name by the Black Crowes. Hemming wrote and performed music for the films A Room for Romeo Brass and Dead Man's Shoes. He was also a member of The Telescopes.

In 2006 Hemming moved to London to work with multi-instrumentalist and producer Christian Hardy; the pair have subsequently built a live band drawn from members of Brighton's Willkommen Collective and further afield, notably Mike Siddell who previously played violin with Hope of the States and The Miserable Rich and currently performs with Lightspeed Champion and Troubles. Other members of the band played with The Miserable Rich and currently play with Sons of Noel and Adrian and more.

The Leisure Society have been recipients of critical acclaim, being dubbed the English answer to popular U.S acts such as Grizzly Bear, Department of Eagles and Fleet Foxes. Their debut single, The Last of the Melting Snow, was honoured with a 2009 Ivor Novello nomination for Best Song Musically & Lyrically.

In July 2009 the band signed with UK label Full Time Hobby, prompting the re-release of The Sleeper with a bonus EP entitled A Product of the Ego Drain. In September 2009, Brian Eno cited the band as "The only other thing I've been listening to lately with enthusiasm", calling it "Such a beautiful album". This prompted a meeting between Hemming, Hardy and Eno at Eno's London studio.

The third single from The Sleeper, "Save It For Someone Who Cares", was also nominated for the Ivor Novello in the same category as the previous year, making the band one of very few consecutive nominees.

The band covered children's song "Inchworm" from Hans Christian Andersen for American Laundromat Records charity CD Sing Me To Sleep – Indie Lullabies, released in May 2010.

Nick Hemming and Christian Hardy also play with childhood friend Tim West in The Climbers, whose debut album was released in May 2010.

The band's second album Into The Murky Water was released in May 2011 and received glowing critical praise and gave the band their first chart position.

The first single from the album, "This Phantom Life", was released with a video starring Green Wing's Mark Heap.

In June 2011, the band were approached by Ray Davies to collaborate on his new songs, resulting in a performance as part of his Meltdown festival.

In April 2013, the band's third studio album Alone Aboard the Ark was released, once again receiving a strong critical reaction from journalists and DJs.

In April 2015, the band's fourth studio album The Fine Art of Hanging On was released, receiving the strongest critical reaction since their debut.

In January 2019, the band announced that their fifth studio album, Arrivals & Departures would be released on 12 April 2019, via their own label, Ego Drain Records.

In June 2023 the band released a collaborative single with Brian Eno called 'Brave Are The Waves' on Willkommen Records.

== Touring ==
The Leisure Society's debut headline show at London's Bush Hall in January 2009 prompted a 5-star review from The Independent.

Over the summer of 2009, the band performed across the UK and Europe, including at The Big Chill, the Green Man Festival and the End of the Road Festival. The band finished 2009 with a tour of Europe and the UK, culminating in a sold-out performance at St Giles' Church, London, and a session for BBC Radio 2's Janice Long.

In January 2010, The Leisure Society toured The Netherlands, France, Spain, Italy, Switzerland, Germany and Ireland, going on to play various festivals over the summer, including Glastonbury, The Big Chill, Summer Sundae and Vintage at Goodwood.

The band performed a sell out UK and European tour through summer 2011 in support of Into The Murky Water, culminating in a performance at London's Barbican Centre backed by the 40-piece Heritage Orchestra.

In October 2011, the band were asked by Laura Marling to accompany her on her tour of UK cathedrals.

In August 2012, the band played at Greenbelt 2012.

== Discography ==
- The Sleeper (2009)
- A product of the Ego Drain (2009)
- Into The Murky Water (2011) (UK chart peak number 75)
- Alone Aboard the Ark (2013) (UK chart peak number 71)
- The Fine Art of Hanging On (2015)
- Arrivals & Departures (2019)
