= Willkommen Collective =

Music collective

The Willkommen Collective is a Brighton, England-based community of musicians, promoters and artists. The collective includes the bands Sons of Noel and Adrian, the Leisure Society, the Climbers, the Miserable Rich, and Shoreline. They also run a record label, Willkommen Records, and put on monthly gigs in Brighton, England. The bands share many members and often work collectively.

== History ==
In June, July and August 2009, the collective ran a series of shows dubbed the "Willkommen takeover..." series including an event at the Union Chapel, Islington, Stanmer House (an annual festival known as Foxtrot) and De La Warr Pavilion.

In February 2010, the Collective performed en masse as "The Willkommen Orchestra" at King's Place, London and Brighton Unitarian Church. The set included selections from the repertoire of the Miserable Rich, Shoreline, Sons of Noel and Adrian and the new 'studio supergroup' the Climbers. In the past, they have performed showcases at End Of The Road Festival, The Big Chill, Brighton Festival and The Great Escape Festival. In 2010, the Collective took five bands to Positivus festival in Latvia and seven bands to The Big Chill in the UK.

== Willkommen Records ==
The collective's associated record label has released music by The Leisure Society and Brian Eno, Damo Suzuki backed by members of The Comet Is Coming and Sons of Noel and Adrian, James Holden collaborating with Led Bib drummer Mark Holub and Marcus Hamblett, and David Thomas Broughton accompanied by Alabaster DePlume.

== Members of the Collective ==
The Collective is a sprawling group of individuals with no fixed membership, but these are some key members and some of the Willkommen Collective bands they have performed with, live and on record:

- Will Calderbank – cello and piano with the Miserable Rich, the Leisure Society, Sons of Noel and Adrian, Shoreline, and the Climbers. Calderbank also records under the name Atlas Crease.
- Catherine Cardin – vocals and percussion with Sons of Noel and Adrian, Laish and the Climbers
- Tom Cowan – guitar with Shoreline, and Sons of Noel and Adrian
- Emma Gatrill – clarinet, bass clarinet, harp, accordion and vocals with Sons of Noel and Adrian
- Daniel Green – drums and vocals with Sons of Noel and Adrian, guitar and vocals with Laish, has also played live with Shoreline and Curly Hair
- Marcus Hamblett – played various instruments live and/or on record with Sons of Noel and Adrian, and Eyes & No Eyes
- Nick Hemming – vocals, guitar, banjo, ukulele and mandolin with the Leisure Society, the Climbers, Shoreline, and Sons of Noel and Adrian
- Jacob Richardson – guitar and vocals with Sons of Noel and Adrian, Shoreline and the Climbers
- Mike Siddell – violin with the Miserable Rich, the Leisure Society, Sons of Noel and Adrian, Shoreline, and the Climbers
- Alistair Strachan – trumpet, cornet, flugelhorn and piano with Sons of Noel and Adrian, and Shoreline.
- Helen Whitaker – flute and vocals with the Leisure Society and Sons of Noel and Adrian
