= Aradhna =

- Origin: Cincinnati, Ohio, US
- Genre: World / Fusion
- Years active: 2000–present
- Label: Independent
- Members: Chris Hale; Peter Hicks; Travis McAfee
- Website: aradhnamusic.com

Aradhna is a band that fuses traditional Indian devotional music (bhajans) with Christ-centered themes, composed primarily in the Hindi language, in addition to Nepali, Bihari, Bhojpuri and Braj Bhasha languages. The band members include Chris Hale (lead vocals, sitar), Peter Hicks (acoustic guitar, sitar) and Travis McAfee (bass). Tabla Player Jim Fiest regularly plays with the band.

== History ==
Aradhna was created in 2000 when Chris Hale and Peter Hicks who had been touring India with their band Olio returned to the US to record Aradhna's debut album 'Deep Jale' (Light the Lamp). The name Aradhna is from Hindi, meaning 'Adoration'. The band-members were interested in creating an authentic sound for Indian Christ-centered worship which had so far relied heavily on Western hymns and contemporary worship. To make this possible the band turned to India's bhajan singers and the style of Indian devotion known as 'bhakti', expressing faith in 'Yeshu Khrist' (Jesus Christ).

Hale assumes primarily songwriting duties due to his fluency in Hindi. In addition to Hale's compositions, the band features songs composed by Peter John, an Indian musician from New Delhi whose Christ-centered bhajans caught Hale's attention. The band involves several Indian musicians in their performances and recordings as well.

In May 2016, Oxford University Press published "The Oxford Handbook of Music and World Christianities" which featured a chapter featuring Aradhna's music, entitled, "Are Western Christian Bhajans Reverse Missions Music?" by Christopher Dicran Hale.

== Musical style ==
Aradhna has evolved in its musical style primarily from the fusion music that Olio played and delving deeper into Northern Indian classical music (Hindustani music) that Hale was learning under the discipleship of Partho Chatterjee (sitar). Hicks, who played electric guitar, also was learning sarod under the discipleship of Calcutta's Partho Sarothy. Travis McAfee added electric bass to this duo in the recording of their debut album, bringing his more traditional western sensibilities and experience to the group. Five years after the formation of the band, Fiona Hicks (married to Peter) added Hindustani violin, having studied Northern Indian classical music under Kala Ramnath.

== Critical reception ==
Aradhna has performed in various venues in the United States, the United Kingdom, and India. These include university campuses and summer music festivals, as well as religious venues such as churches, Hindu and Buddhist temples, Sikh Gurdwaras, and yoga studios.

Reviews have compared Hicks's vocals to Peter Gabriel's. Aradhna has performed with talented guest artists like Jim Fiest on both recordings and tours.

== Discography ==
Title	Year
Deep Jalé	2000
Marga Darshan	2002
Satsang	2004
Amrit Vani	2007
Namaste Saté	2011
Sapna	2012
Live in Concert	2013
