= MUSICultures =

- Discipline: folk music, ethnomusicology
- Language: English, French

Publication details
- History: 1988–present
- Publisher: Canadian Society for Traditional Music (Canada)
- Frequency: Annual
- Open access: Yes

Standard abbreviations
- ISO 4: MUSICultures

Indexing
- ISSN: 1920-4213
- OCLC no.: 458291425

Links
- Journal homepage; Online access

MUSICultures is a peer-reviewed academic journal formerly published as Canadian Journal for Traditional Music/La Revue de musique folklorique canadienne (1996–2002) and Canadian Folk Music Journal (1973–1996). The journal includes scholarly articles pertaining to Canadian, global, and transnational music.
