= Tunng =

English folk music band

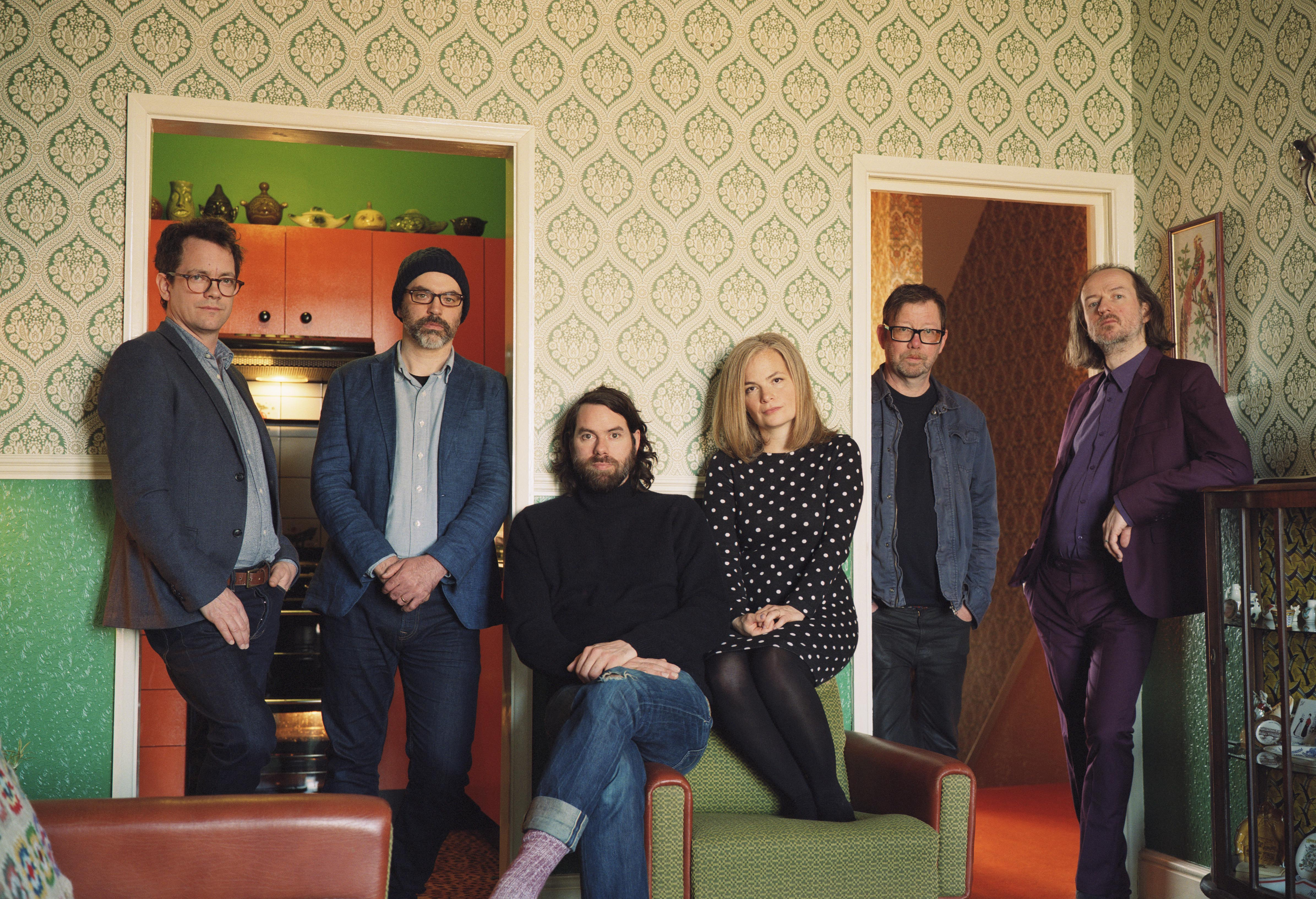
- Tunng in 2018

Background information
- Origin: London, England
- Genres: Folktronica; nu-folk; neofolk; folk house; electro-folk; electroacoustic; ambient; IDM; minimal; experimental; avant-garde
- Years active: 2003–present
- Labels: Full Time Hobby; Static Caravan Recordings; Thrill Jockey
- Members: Mike Lindsay; Sam Genders; Ashley Bates; Phil Winter; Becky Jacobs; Martin Smith
- Past members: Simon Glenister
- Website: tunng.co.uk

Tunng are an English folk music band. They are often associated with the folktronica genre, due to the electronic influences evident in some of their work. Tunng are often noted for their use of unconventional instruments, including seashells and percussive electronic samples.

== History ==
Sam Genders and Mike Lindsay, two of the founding members of Tunng, began their musical careers together after meeting at one of Genders's early London solo gigs.

Besides releasing five albums and numerous singles since 2004, Tunng have covered Bloc Party's song "The Pioneers." Both the original and cover were featured in the third season of The O.C. ("The Man of the Year", Episode 24). They also covered Tim Buckley's "No Man Can Find The War" for the 2006 tribute album Dream Brother: The Songs of Tim and Jeff Buckley.

They supported Doves on dates at the end of their 2005 tour. Member Becky Jacobs is the younger sister of electronic musician Max Tundra.

In 2007, the band were included on The Imagined Village album, with a retold version of "Death and the Maiden". In 2008, Tunng remixed the song "Hoko Onchi" on Dive Index's Collisions – The Mid/Air Remixes. Their song "Bullets" was played during the end credits of the Weeds season four episode, "Till We Meet Again", in September 2008.

"Jenny Again," from Comments of the Inner Chorus, was used as the soundtrack for the TV ad from the NSPCC to launch the NSPCC Child's Voice Appeal.

In March 2009, Tunng played together with a trio from the Tuareg desert blues band Tinariwen on a UK tour, and they also played together at Glastonbury in June 2009 and 2010. In May 2010, Tunng headlined at the Wood Festival in Oxfordshire, England. Tunng's appearance at Truck Festival in July 2011 was their only UK performance of the summer.

In August 2011, Tunng remixed Gnomes by Sea of Bees. On 5 December 2011, the band released This Is Tunng ... Live From The BBC, an album of Tunng tracks played in various BBC sessions with Huw Stephens, Lauren Laverne, Rob Da Bank, Marc Riley and Giles Peterson, amongst others.

Tunng released their fifth full-length album Turbines, on 18 June 2013. Tunng came back on 27 March 2018 with the single Flatland, closely followed on 15 May 2018 by the new single ABOP, announcing the release of the band's first album in five years. On 24 August 2018 the band released their sixth album Songs You Make At Night, which reunites founding members Sam Genders and Mike Lindsay and the rest of the Tunng original line-up for the first time since 2007’s Good Arrows.

== Members ==
Current members

- Mike Lindsay – lead vocals, guitar (2003–present)
- Ashley Bates – guitar, banjo, backing vocals (2004–present)
- Phil Winter – keyboards, percussion, sampler (2004–present)
- Becky Jacobs – keyboards, melodica, backing and lead vocals (2004–present)
- Martin Smith – percussion, drums (2004–present)
- Sam Genders – guitar, bass, backing and lead vocals (2003–2008, 2018–present)

Former members

- Simon Glenister – drums (2009–2018)

== Discography ==
=== Studio albums ===
- Mother's Daughter and Other Songs, 10 January 2005
- Comments of the Inner Chorus, 22 May 2006
- Good Arrows, 27 August 2007
- ...And Then We Saw Land, 1 March 2010
- Turbines, 18 June 2013
- Songs You Make at Night, 24 August 2018
- Dead Club, 6 November 2020
- Love You All Over Again, 25 January 2025

=== Compilation albums ===
- This Is Tunng... Live from the BBC, 5 December 2011
- This Is Tunng...Magpie Bites and Other Cuts, 28 June 2019

=== Singles ===
- "Tale from Black", June 2004
- "The Maypole Song", August 2004
- "People Folk" (Remixed by Dollboy), 9 May 2005
- "Magpie Bites", 21 November 2005 (7")
- "The Pioneers" (Bloc Party cover), 23 January 2006 (7"/CD)
- "Woodcat", 24 April 2006 (7")
- "Jenny Again", 4 September 2006 (7")
- "It's Because...We've Got Hair", 11 November 2006 (7")
- "Bricks", 13 August 2007 (7") No. 20 UK Indie
- "Bullets", 15 October 2007 (7"/CD)
- "Hustle", 22 February 2010 (7"/CD)
- "Sashimi", 17 May 2010 (7"/CD)
- "Don't Look Down or Back", 2 August 2010
- "Flatland", 27 March 2018
- "ABOP", 15 May 2018
- "Didn't Know Why", 8 October 2024
- "Deep Underneath", 5 November 2024
- "Everything Else", 2024
- "Snails", 2025
- "Sixes", 2025
- "Anoraks", 2025
