= Full Time Hobby =

British record label

- Founded: 2004
- Status: Active
- Country of origin: United Kingdom
- Location: London, England
- Official website: Full Time Hobby website

Full Time Hobby is an independent record label formed in London in January 2004. Since its inception it has released records by artists such as Dana Gavanski, Squirrel Flower, Timber Timbre, Tunng, Micah P. Hinson, Michael Nau, Katie Von Schleicher, White Denim, Pale Blue Eyes and GHOSTWOMAN.

== History ==
Full Time Hobby came into life in 2004, set up by Nigel Adams and Wez. They had met at Mushroom Records / Infectious Records and decided to start a label when it was clear that Mushroom was going to be sold to Warner Brothers. Inspired by labels like the original Jac Holzman era Elektra Records, Creation Records and Rough Trade Records they wanted to start a label that championed original and creative new music that they loved and did not see finding a home elsewhere.

The first release as Full Time Hobby was the EP Alive With Pleasure by Portland, Oregon based duo Viva Voce who went on to release another two albums and a compilation for the label. In 2005 the label made a pivotal signing with the band Tunng who they had known through their involvement with Full Time Hobby's Tim & Jeff Buckley inspired compilation Dream Brother. Tunng have so far released three albums for the label as well as spawning side projects The Accidental, formed by Tunng co-founder Sam Genders alongside Stephen Cracknall, Liam Bailey and Hannah Caughlin and the soon to be released side project of co-founder Mike Lindsay titled Cheek Mountain Thief. Sam Genders left Tunng in 2008 and has since gone on to form a new act, Diagrams, signed to Full Time Hobby in 2011.

In 2006, FTH started working with The Hold Steady through a connection with Vagrant Records. They went on to release the band's third album Boys and Girls in America, followed shortly by the re-release of the band's first two albums, Almost Killed Me and Separation Sunday, via a license an agreement with US label Frenchkiss Records.

2007 saw Full Time Hobby sign White Denim, a then unknown Texan trio, having been sent demos by the band's manager. They went on to work with the band on the debut album Workout Holiday released in 2008 prior to any US release and follow up album Fits a year later.

The Leisure Society signed with the label in 2009, and the label promptly re-issued their debut album The Sleeper, feted with two Ivor Novello Awards nominations. This was followed in 2011 by the release of their second album Into The Murky Water.

Album releases in 2012 included a new record from Diagrams, with their debut album Black Light. Danish band Pinkunoizu released their debut Free Time in March 2012 and Canadian indie-garage heads Hooded Fang with their album Tosta Mista.

2013 saw the label release an album of covers of the late singer/songwriter Tim Hardin. Entitled Reason to Believe, The Songs of Tim Hardin, it features covers from Full Time Hobby artists such as Diagrams and Pinkunoizu, and other covers from Mark Lanegan, Okkervil River and The Phoenix Foundation.

Further releases for 2013 saw a new album from The Leisure Society entitled 'Alone Aboard the Ark' on 1 April. Hooded Fang and Tunng also released albums in the same year.

In 2014 the label released "Hot Dreams" by Canadian act Timber Timbre. The Guardian awarded the album five stars, praising the "surprises and delights on this smoky, Lynchian retreat".

2015 saw the label release "Under Branch & Thorn & Tree" by Samantha Crain. The Observer gave the album four stars, praising "the richness of Crain's voice and the elegant simplicity of the musical arrangements". Other highlights included Dutch psych artist Jacco Gardner's "Hypnophobia", and Farao's "Till It's All Forgotten".

In 2016 the label released the final album from School of Seven Bells, "SVIIB", which Pitchfork gave a score of 8.1. Other releases included Aidan Knight's "Each Other" and The Magnetic North's "Prospect of Skelmersdale".

== Artists ==
Full Time Hobby's current roster of artists includes:

- Bananagun
- Canty
- Dana Gavanski
- GHOSTWOMAN
- Pale Blue Eyes
- Macie Stewart
- Squirrel Flower
- The Saxophones
- Tunng

Alumni:

- Aidan Knight
- The Accidental
- Autolux
- Braids
- Craig Finn
- Cheek Mountain Thief
- Diagrams
- Dralms
- Erland and the Carnival
- Farao
- Jacco Gardner
- Katie Von Schleicher
- Micah P. Hinson
- Fujiya & Miyagi
- The Hold Steady
- Hooded Fang
- Let's Wrestle
- The Magnetic North
- Malcolm Middleton
- Michael Nau
- Pinkunoizu
- Samantha Crain
- The Leisure Society
- School of Seven Bells
- Timber Timbre
- Throws
- Viva Voce
- White Denim
