= White Denim discography =

Band discography

- Studio albums: 14
- EPs: 4
- Live albums: 2
- Singles: 20
- Music videos: 8

The discography of American rock band White Denim consists of thirteen studio albums (including one collaborative), one live album, four extended plays, two splits, eighteen singles and eight music videos.

== Albums ==
=== Studio albums ===
List of studio albums, with selected chart positions
Title	Album details	Peak chart positions						
Title	Album details	US	US Heat	US Indie	US Rock	US Taste	BEL (FL)	UK
Workout Holiday	Released: June 23, 2008; Label: Full Time Hobby; Formats: CD, LP, digital download	—	—	—	—	—	—	—
Exposion	Released: October 19, 2008; Label: Transmission; Formats: CD, digital download	—	—	—	—	—	—	—
Fits	Released: June 22, 2009; Label: Full Time Hobby / Downtown; Formats: CD, LP, digital download	—	—	—	—	—	—	—
Last Day of Summer	Released: September 23, 2010; Label: Self-released; Formats: CD, LP, digital download	—	—	—	—	—	—	—
D	Released: May 24, 2011; Label: Downtown; Formats: CD, LP, digital download	—	16	—	—	—	—	—
Corsicana Lemonade	Released: October 29, 2013; Label: Downtown; Formats: CD, LP, digital download	147	4	26	42	24	183	—
Stiff	Released: March 25, 2016; Label: Downtown; Formats: CD, LP, digital download	—	4	18	26	9	—	20
Performance	Released: August 24, 2018; Label: City Slang; Formats: CD, LP, digital download	—	—	—	—	—	—	25
Side Effects	Released: March 29, 2019; Label: City Slang; Formats: CD, LP, digital download	—	—	—	—	—	—	—
World as a Waiting Room	Released: May 8, 2020; Label: Radio Milk; Formats: CD, LP, digital download	—	—	—	—	—	—	—
Crystal Bullets / King Tears	Released: July 30, 2021; Label: English Mallard; Formats: LP	—	—	—	—	—	—	—
Raze Regal & White Denim Inc. (with Raze Regal)	Released: November 24, 2023; Label: Bella Union; Formats: LP, digital download	—	—	—	—	—	—	—
12	Released: December 6, 2024; Label: Bella Union; Formats: LP, CD, digital download	—	—	—	—	—	—	65
13	Released: April 24, 2026; Label: Bella Union; Formats: LP, CD, digital download	—	—	—	—	—	—	—
Hypnotist	Scheduled: November 13, 2026; Formats: LP	—	—	—	—	—	—	—
"—" denotes a recording that did not chart or was not released in that territory.

=== Live albums ===
List of live albums
Title	Album details
Live at Third Man	Released: 2011; Label: Third Man; Formats: LP
In Person	Released: October 29, 2019; Label: Radio Milk Records; Formats: LP

=== Splits ===
List of split releases
Title	Album details	Additional artists
Daytrotter Presents No. 5	Released: January 2013; Label: Daytrotter; Formats: LP	Maps and Atlases

=== Extended plays ===
List of extended plays
Title	Album details
Let's Talk About It	Released: May 12, 2007; Label: Self-released; Formats: 7"
Workout Holiday	Released: 2007; Label: Self-released; Formats: 7"
RCRD LBL EP	Released: December 3, 2007; Label: RCRD LBL; Formats: Digital download
Takes Place in Your Work Space	Released: November 15, 2011; Label: Downtown; Formats: 12", digital download

== Singles ==
List of singles, showing year released and album name
Title	Year	Album
"All You Really Have to Do"	2008	Workout Holiday
"Shake Shake Shake"	2008	Workout Holiday
"Let's Talk About It"	2008	Workout Holiday
"I Start to Run"	2009	Fits
"Regina Holding Hands"	2009	Fits
"Is and Is and Is"	2011	D
"Drug"	2011	D
"Bess St."	2011	D
"Keys"	2012	D
"At Night In Dreams"	2013	Corsicana Lemonade
"Pretty Green"	2013	Corsicana Lemonade
"A Place to Start"	2014	Corsicana Lemonade
"Holda You (I'm Psycho)"	2016	Stiff
"Ha Ha Ha Ha (Yeah)"	2016	Stiff
"Had 2 Know (Personal)"	2016	Stiff
"No Nee Ta Slode Aln"	2017	Non-album single
"Magazin"	2018	Performance
"It Might Get Dark"	2018	Performance
"Fine Slime"	2018	Performance
"Crystal Bullets"	2021	Crystal Bullets / King Tears

== Music videos ==
List of music videos, showing year released and director
Title	Year	Director(s)
"Shake Shake Shake"	2008	Tom Haines
"I Start to Run"	2009	
"Drug	2011	
"Street Joy"	2011	
"Pretty Green"	2013	Michael Hammett, Aaron Weiss, and James Petralli
"At Night in Dreams"	2014	Brian K. Jones
"Holda You (I'm Psycho)"	2016	Kyle Gaughan
"Ha Ha Ha Ha (Yeah)"	2016	DREAMTIGER
