= This Land =

This Land may refer to:

- This Land (TV series), a Canadian TV series
- This Land (Bill Frisell album), 1994
- This Land (Gary Clark Jr. album), 2019
  - This Land (song), the title track of the Gary Clark Jr. album
- This Land (podcast), an American political podcast
- "This Land", an instrumental by Hans Zimmer on The Lion King: Original Motion Picture Soundtrack
- This Land, a magazine published by This Land Press
- This Land, a political animation by JibJab
- This Land: How Cowboys, Capitalism, and Corruption are Ruining the American West, a book by journalist Christopher Ketcham

== See also ==
- This Land Is Mine (disambiguation)
- "This Land Is Your Land", a 1944 American folk song by Woody Guthrie
