= Gary Clark Jr. Live =

2014 live album by Gary Clark Jr.

Live album by Gary Clark Jr.
- Released: September 23, 2014
- Recorded: 2013–2014
- Genre: Blues rock
- Length: 96:24
- Label: Warner Bros.
- Producer: Bharath "Cheex" Ramanth; Gary Clark Jr.

Gary Clark Jr. chronology
Blak and Blu (2012)	Gary Clark Jr. Live (2014)	The Story of Sonny Boy Slim (2015)

Gary Clark Jr. Live, or simply Live, is a live double album by American musician Gary Clark Jr., released by Warner Bros. Records on September 23, 2014. The tracks featured on the album were recorded over the course of an 18-month-long tour from 2013 to 2014.

Gary Clark Jr. Live was ranked No. 47 on Rolling Stone's list of the "50 Best Albums of 2014".

== Reception ==
Professional ratings
Review scores
Source	Rating
AllMusic	4/5 stars
Rolling Stone	4/5 stars

AllMusic's Steve Leggett called Gary Clark Jr. Live "a wonderful introduction to a fine young guitar player, songwriter, and singer", complimenting Clark's guitar playing as well as the sound quality. David Fricke of Rolling Stone praised the album as an improvement on Clark's 2012 studio effort Blak and Blu, writing that his extended solos in Gary Clark Jr. Live "show his clear, personal spin on the more recent precedents of Jimi Hendrix and Stevie Ray Vaughan". Michael Haskoor of Diffuser.fm also praised the album, calling it "simply great from front to back. [...] Gary Clark Jr. Live is not only an album, it's an experience."

Rolling Stone ranked Gary Clark Jr. Live No. 47 on their list of the "50 Best Albums of 2014". In 2016, Troy L. Smith of Cleveland.com included Gary Clark Jr. Live on his list of "35 amazing live albums from the past 25 years", writing that it "showcases [Clark's] uncanny ability to ride a solo to chill-inducing levels. It also highlights his underrated falsetto."

== Track listing ==
All tracks are written by Gary Clark Jr., except where noted.

Disc one
No.	Title	Writer(s)	Length
1.	"Catfish Blues"	Muddy Waters	8:00
2.	"Next Door Neighbor Blues"		4:06
3.	"Travis County"		3:42
4.	"When My Train Pulls In"		7:10
5.	"Don't Owe You a Thang"		6:12
6.	"Three O'Clock Blues"	B.B. King	6:23
7.	"Things Are Changin'"		6:09
8.	"Numb"		6:13
Total length:			47:55

Disc two
No.	Title	Writer(s)	Length
1.	"Ain't Messin' Round"		6:36
2.	"If Trouble Was Money"	Albert Collins	6:40
3.	"Third Stone from the Sun/If You Love Me Like You Say"	Jimi Hendrix/Little Johnny Taylor	10:27
4.	"Please Come Home"		6:33
5.	"Blak and Blu"	Gary Clark Jr., Gil Scott-Heron, Brian Jackson, Don Robey	4:03
6.	"Bright Lights"		8:26
7.	"When the Sun Goes Down"	Leroy Carr	5:44
Total length:			48:29

== Personnel ==
Adapted from the album's liner notes.

Gary Clark Jr. Band

- Gary Clark Jr. – vocals, lead guitar, harmonica
- King Zapata – guitars
- Johnny Bradley – bass guitar
- Johnny Radelat – drums

Production

- Bharath "Cheex" Ramanth – producer and recording
- Gary Clark Jr. – producer
- Rob Cavallo and Scooter Weintraub – co-producers
- Kris Krishna – associate producer
- Robert Collins – recording on "If You Love Me Like You Say" and "Please Come Home"
- Doug McKean – mixing
- Tom Rasulo – assistant engineer
- Lenny Waronker – A&R
- Brian Gardner – mastering
