= Pretty Green =

Pretty Green may refer to:

- The first track of the 1980 album Sound Affects by the Jam
- A clothing label originally fronted by Liam Gallagher, frontman of English rock band Oasis and previously Beady Eye, named after the song of the same name by the Jam. Now owned by Frasers Group.
- "Pretty Green Eyes", a song by the act Force & Styles
- A song from the album Corsicana Lemonade by White Denim.
