= Live at Third Man Records =

Live at Third Man Records may refer to:

- Live at Third Man Records (Blitzen Trapper album), 2016 album by Blitzen Trapper
- Live at Third Man Records (Billie Eilish album), 2020 album by Billie Eilish
- Live at Third Man Records West, 2009 EP by The Dead Weather
- Live at Third Man, 2011 EP by White Denim
- Live at Third Man Records, 2026 album by Geese
- Live at Third Man Records, 2010 album by the Dex Romweber Duo
- Live at Third Man Records, 2010 album by The Raconteurs
- Live at Third Man Records, 2010 album by Conan O'Brien
- Live at Third Man Records, 2010 album by Nobunny
- Live at Third Man Records, 2010 album by Jenny & Johnny
- Live at Third Man Records, 2010 album by JEFF the Brotherhood
- Live at Third Man Records, 2011 album by Reggie Watts
- Live at Third Man Records, 2011 album by the Cold War Kids
- Live at Third Man Records, 2011 album by Wanda Jackson
- Live at Third Man Records, 2011 album by the Drive-By Truckers
- Live at Third Man Records, 2011 album by White Denim

For more see Third Man Records#Discography
