= Takes Place in Your Work Space =

Takes Place In Your Work Space

EP by White Denim
- Released: 2011
- Genre: Rock

White Denim chronology
Live at Third Man (2011)	Takes Place In Your Work Space (2011)	Corsicana Lemonade (2013)

Takes Place In Your Work Space is White Denim's fifth EP released in 2011. It was given a rating of 7.1 by Pitchfork.

== Track listing ==
1. Cat City
2. No Real Reason
3. Handwriting
4. Company

== Personnel ==
- James Petralli: vocals, guitar
- Joshua Block: drums
- Steve Terebecki: vocals, bass
- Austin Jenkins: guitar
