= 12 (White Denim album) =

2024 album by White Denim

Studio album by White Denim
- Released: December 6, 2024
- Genre: Alternative rock; psychedelic rock
- Length: 38:55
- Label: Bella Union

White Denim chronology
| Raze Regal & White Denim Inc. (2023) | 12 (2024) | 13 (2026) |

12 is the twelfth studio album by American rock band White Denim. It was released on December 6, 2024, via Bella Union.

12 received positive acclaim upon its release, with a Metacritic score of 88/100 indicating "universal acclaim". Critical appraisals welcomed 12's lush, disciplined production, bandleader James Petralli's psychedelic pop songwriting sensibilities, and what the record revealed about the flexibility of the group's sound.

== Background ==
Following the release of Raze Regal & White Denim Inc. in November 2023, White Denim founder James Petralli began writing on a twelfth studio album under the White Denim moniker. During that time, Petralli maintained a Substack newsletter chronicling snippets of the writing process, distributing work in progress demos, and sharing musings on the realities of being a professional musician.

His newsletter dispatches (along with posts on the White Denim Instagram) also outlined Petralli's forays into other commercial and personal projects (including a remix of a song by Dutch indie rock band Personal Trainer and co-producing Waiting Game, the 2024 record by Connecticut jam band Eggy).

On September 4, 2024, White Denim announced 12 with the release of the single "Light On" and an accompanying music video, with the album slated for release on December 6 of the same year. Another single from 12, "Second Dimension," followed on October 9, with "Look Good" rounding out the pre-release singles on November 12.

=== Composition and songwriting ===
Petralli composed and recorded 12 with frequent White Denim members, touring musicians, and collaborators including Cat Clemons, Josh Block, Michael Hunter, and others.

In a Reddit AMA following the record's release, Petralli noted that influences for the lyrical content of the record range from his personal experiences ("attempting to deal with my childhood in order to be better for my children and colleagues") to the biblical ("That prodigal son shit bangs!").

== Critical reception ==
Professional ratings
Aggregate scores
| Source | Rating |
|---|---|
| Metacritic | 88/100 |
Review scores
| Source | Rating |
| AllMusic | 9/10 |
| Uncut | 9.5/10 |
| Clash | 80/100 |
| Glide | 70/100 |

12 was positively received upon its release. On Metacritic, which assigns a normalized score out of 100 to ratings from publications, the album received a mean score of 88 based on 8 reviews, indicating "universal acclaim".

== Track listing ==
All tracks are written by James Petralli and White Denim.

| No. | Title | Length |
|---|---|---|
| 1. | "Light On" | 2:59 |
| 2. | "Econolining" | 2:26 |
| 3. | "Flash Bare Ass" | 3:29 |
| 4. | "Cat City #2" | 0:45 |
| 5. | "Look Good" | 3:35 |
| 6. | "Second Dimension" | 3:57 |
| 7. | "I Still Exist" | 3:34 |
| 8. | "Your Future As God" | 3:16 |
| 9. | "Swinging Door" | 3:41 |
| 10. | "We Can Move Along" | 3:47 |
| 11. | "Hand Out Giving" | 4:28 |
| 12. | "Precious Child" | 2:56 |
| Total length: | | 38:55 |

== Personnel ==
=== Musicians ===
- James Petralli - composition, lyrics, arrangement, production, lead vocals, guitar
- Michael Hunter - composition (tracks 1, 2, 3, 4, 6, 7, 10, 12)
- Tameca Jones - vocals, composition (track 5)
- Jessie Payo - vocals, composition (track 5)
- Josh Block - composition (track 8)
- Finom - featured artist (track 9)
- Eric Slick - featured artist, composer (track 11)
- Jared Samuel - featured artist, composer, lyricist (track 11)
- Cat Clemons - composition (track 12)
