= Let's Talk About It (disambiguation) =

Let's Talk About It is a 2004 album by Carl Thomas.

Let's Talk About It may also refer to:

- "Let's Talk About It" (Seiko Matsuda song), a 1998 song by Seiko Matsuda
- Let's Talk About It EP, a 2007 EP by White Denim
- Let's Talk About It (book), a 2021 graphic novel by Erica Moen and Matthew Nolan
