= Workout Holiday =

EP by White Denim
- Released: 2007
- Recorded: 2007
- Genre: Indie rock
- Length: 21:44
- Label: Self-released

White Denim chronology
Let's Talk About It (2007)	Workout Holiday (2007)	Workout Holiday LP (2008)

Workout Holiday is the second release for Austin, Texas-based rock trio White Denim, consisting of nine self-recorded songs. Also known as the "Tour EP", Workout Holiday was sold exclusively on tour in 2007.

At the end of 2007, the band signed with online record company RCRD LBL and released a downloadable three-song EP entitled the RCRD LBL EP. The digital EP consists of re-recorded tracks from Workout Holiday, and each track was released over the first quarter of 2008. All three tracks are available at the RCRD LBL website.

== Track listing ==
=== Workout Holiday ===
1. "World As A Waiting Room" - 2:17
2. "Look That Way At It" - 1:56
3. "Sam #1.war" - 0:07
4. "Goldielocks" - 1:53
5. "All Truckers Roll" - 2:30
6. "Shake Shake Shake" - 2:39
7. "Paint Silver Gold" - 3:02
8. "IEIEI" - 3:32
9. "Let's Get Together" - 3:28

=== RCRD LBL EP ===
1. "World As A Waiting Room" - 2:17
2. "Paint Silver Gold" - 3:15
3. "Goldie Locks" - 2:02

=== Videos ===
- "Let's Get Together" - Video that was directed by Carlos LaRotta, shot by LaRotta's family, edited by Trey Cartwright, both of Birds-on-Fire Film
- "Ieiei" - Video was shot by White Denim, animation by Jason Archer, edited by Jason Archer and Carlos LaRotta, for Birds on Fire Film.

== Personnel ==
- James Petralli: Vocals, guitar
- Joshua Block: Drums
- Steve Terebecki: Vocals, bass
