= Shake Shake Shake =

Shake Shake Shake may refer to:

- "(Shake, Shake, Shake) Shake Your Booty", a song by KC and the Sunshine Band, 1976
- Shake! Shake! Shake!, an album by Bronze Radio Return, 2011
- "Shake Shake Shake", a song by Majid Jordan from Majid Jordan, 2016
- "Shake Shake Shake", a song by White Denim from Exposion, 2008

== See also ==
- "Shake Shake (All Ladies in the House)" a song by Pritam and Indee from Naksha, 2006 Indian film
