= JPEG Raw =

Studio album by Gary Clark Jr.
- Released: March 22, 2024
- Length: 54:02
- Label: Warner
- Producer: Gary Clark Jr.; Jacob Sciba

Gary Clark Jr. chronology
This Land (2019)	JPEG Raw (2024)

JPEG Raw is the fourth studio album by American blues rock musician Gary Clark Jr. It was released on March 22, 2024, through Warner Records and features guest appearances from Stevie Wonder, George Clinton, Valerie June, and Keyon Harrold.

== Background ==
The title JPEG Raw is an acronym for Jealousy, Pride, Envy, Greed, Rules, Alter Ego, Worlds. The album came out of a time period in which Clark Jr. would find himself alone in the studio during COVID-19 quarantining in March 2020, trying to set himself back to when he first started making music at the age of 12. In a press release, JPEG Raw was described as a showcase of Clark Jr.'s "ever-expanding creative palate" as well as his "eclectic musical universe". He explained that JPEG Raw is about "showing the real and not the edit" as he grew tired of not having "more genuine interaction" due to a "world of edits, filters and redos". The album finds him expanding on his palette of influences, including traditional African music, jazz, rock, R&B, hip-hop, and blues. The musician is set to tour the record from May to August 2024 through the United States.

== Track listing ==
JPEG Raw track listing
No.	Title	Writer(s)	Length
1.	"Maktub"	Gary Clark Jr.; Sama'an Ashrawi; Elijah Ford; Jacob Sciba	4:13
2.	"JPEG Raw"	Clark	4:26
3.	"Don't Start" (featuring Valerie June)	Clark; Sciba	3:03
4.	"This Is Who We Are" (featuring Naala)	Clark; Naala; Phranchyze; Sciba	5:31
5.	"To the End of the Earth"	Clark	1:08
6.	"Alone Together" (featuring Keyon Harrold)	Clark	4:30
7.	"What About the Children" (featuring Stevie Wonder)	Clark; Sciba; Stevie Wonder	4:39
8.	"Hearts in Retrograde"	Ford; JJ Johnson; Kevin McKeown; Zapata	3:54
9.	"Hyperwave"	Clark; Jon Deas; Ford; Johnson; Sciba; Zapata	4:33
10.	"Funk Witch U" (featuring George Clinton)	Clark; Deas; Ford; Johnson; Zapata	4:19
11.	"Triumph"	Clark	4:41
12.	"Habits"	Clark	9:05
Total length:			54:02

== Personnel ==
Musicians

- Gary Clark Jr. – lead vocals, lead guitar (all tracks); rhythm guitar (tracks 1–7, 9–12), background vocals (1, 2, 4, 6, 9–12), programming (2–4, 6, 9), drums (2, 6); finger snaps, fuzz guitar, Moog (2); drum programming (3, 6, 11); percussion, synthesizer (3, 11); Mellotron, string synthesizer, wind synthesizer (4); hand claps, wah wah guitar (7); bass synthesizer, electric piano, organ (11); acoustic guitar, hi-string guitar (12)
- Jon Deas – keyboards, Mellotron, programming, Vox organ (track 1); piano (2, 10, 11), vibraphone (2), Hammond B3 organ (3, 4, 7, 12), bass synthesizer (3, 7), synthesizer (4, 6, 8–10), wind synthesizer (4); flute, strings (6); bass keyboards (8); guitar, Rhodes (9), vocoder (10); Oberheim synthesizer, Wurlitzer (12)
- Elijah Ford – Minimoog, ondes Martenot (track 1); electric bass (8, 9, 11, 12), background vocals (8, 9, 11)
- JJ Johnson – percussion (1, 2, 7–10, 12), drums (1, 6–12), congas (12)
- Savannah Allee – background vocals (tracks 1, 4, 6–12), hand claps (7)
- Shanan Ashlee – background vocals (tracks 1, 4, 6–12), hand claps (7)
- Shawn Aleesha – background vocals (tracks 1, 4, 6–12), hand claps (7)
- King Zapata – rhythm guitar (tracks 1, 8–12)
- Alex Peterson – electric bass (tracks 2, 3, 7, 10), upright bass (2)
- Valerie June – lead vocals (track 3)
- Mike Elizondo – bass (tracks 4, 6), Juno synthesizer (4)
- Naala – lead vocals, background vocals (track 4)
- Keyon Harrold – trumpet (track 6)
- Stevie Wonder – lead vocals, clavinet, harmonica (track 7)
- Daniel "Cappy Dee" Herbst – additional vocals (track 9)
- George Clinton – ad-lib vocals, background vocals (track 10)
- Ella Clark – background vocals (track 11)
- Gia Clark – background vocals (track 11)
- Zion Clark – background vocals (track 11)
- Zander Holloway – background vocals (track 11)

Technical

- Gary Clark Jr. – production, engineering
- Jacob Sciba – production, mixing, engineering
- Mike Bozzi – mastering
- Mike Elizondo – additional production (tracks 1, 12)
- Cristian Perez – vocal engineering (track 7)
- Xavier Stephenson – vocal engineering (track 7)
- Justin Francis – additional engineering
- Noah Nunez – engineering assistance
- Kelsey Porter – engineering assistance (track 10)
- Lamar Mitchell – technician (track 7)

== Charts ==
Chart performance for JPEG Raw
Chart (2024)	Peak position
Croatian International Albums (HDU)	30
Hungarian Albums (MAHASZ)	22
Swiss Albums (Schweizer Hitparade)	62
UK Album Downloads (OCC)	64
