= The Story of Sonny Boy Slim =

2015 album by Gary Clark, Jr.

Studio album by Gary Clark, Jr.
- Released: September 11, 2015
- Genre: Blues; rock; soul; R&B
- Length: 53:42
- Label: Warner Bros.
- Producer: Gary Clark, Jr., Bharath "Cheex" Ramanath, & Jacob Sciba

Gary Clark, Jr. chronology
Gary Clark Jr. Live (2014)	The Story of Sonny Boy Slim (2015)	This Land (2019)

The Story of Sonny Boy Slim is the second studio album by American blues rock musician Gary Clark Jr., released on September 11, 2015, through Warner Bros. Records. The album features 13 originals tracks and showcases many of Clark's signature moves. Clark blends his usual styles of blues, rock and soul music, with occasional touches of hip hop and R&B, to create his signature sound.

The album's title was created by blending his two childhood nicknames. Sonny Boy was the nickname his mother gave him, Slim was given to him on the Austin Texas blues scene and referred to his tall and thin physical build.

It reached number one on the Billboard Top Blues Albums chart in October that year.

== Track listing ==
All tracks are written by Gary Clark Jr., except where noted.

No.	Title	Length
1.	"The Healing"	4:49
2.	"Grinder"	3:22
3.	"Star"	4:44
4.	"Our Love"	4:12
5.	"Church"	5:10
6.	"Hold On"	3:47
7.	"Cold Blooded"	3:43
8.	"Wings"	4:12
9.	"Byob"	1:00
10.	"Can't Sleep"	3:48
11.	"Stay"	3:45
12.	"Shake"	3:18
13.	"Down to Ride"	7:52

== Charts ==
=== Weekly charts ===
Chart (2015)	Peak position
Australian Albums (ARIA)	18
Austrian Albums (Ö3 Austria)	56
Belgian Albums (Ultratop Flanders)	34
Belgian Albums (Ultratop Wallonia)	39
Canadian Albums (Billboard)	12
Dutch Albums (Album Top 100)	10
French Albums (SNEP)	126
German Albums (Offizielle Top 100)	74
Irish Albums (IRMA)	85
New Zealand Albums (RMNZ)	13
Scottish Albums (OCC)	41
Swiss Albums (Schweizer Hitparade)	21
UK Albums (OCC)	40
US Billboard 200	8
US Top Blues Albums (Billboard)	1
US Top Rock Albums (Billboard)	4

=== Year-end charts ===
Chart (2015)	Position
US Top Blues Albums (Billboard)	1
US Top Rock Albums (Billboard)	74

Chart (2016)	Position
US Top Blues Albums (Billboard)	5

== Personnel ==
Adapted from the album's liner notes.

- Gary Clark, Jr. – all vocals, guitars, bass, drums, and keyboards, except where noted below (plus harmonica on track 5, snaps on 4, and claps on 12)
- Christopher Copeland – intro on "The Healing"
- Nicole Trunfio and Zion Rain Clark – intro on "Hold On"
- Johnny Bradley – bass (tracks 1, 7, and 12)
- Jason Frey – baritone sax (3), tenor sax (4, 6, 7, 9)
- Bharath "Cheex" Ramanath – synth (3), snaps (4), claps (12)
- Hard Proof Horns (4, 6, 7, 9)
  - Derek Phelps – trumpet
  - Jason Frey – tenor sax
  - Joe Woullard – baritone sax and flute
- Lewis Stephens – organ and piano (5, 7), organ (10)
- Johnny Radelat – drums on "Cold Blooded"
- J.J. Johnson – drums on "Can't Sleep"
- Jacob Sciba – bass on "Stay"
- King Zapata – guitar on "Stay"
- Jay Moeller – drums on "Shake"
- Shawn Clark and Savannah Clark – backing vocals (1, 3, 5)
- Tameca Jones – backing vocals on "Wings"
