= Gary Clark Jr. =

American blues musician (born 1984)

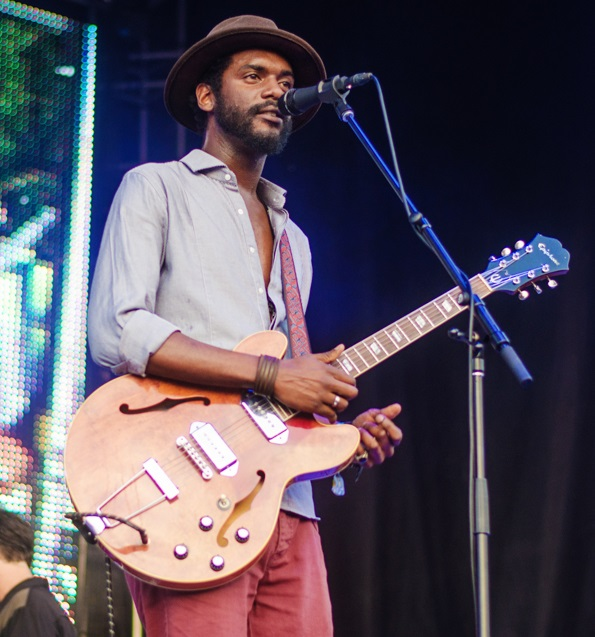
- Clark performing at the North Coast Music Festival 2013

Background information
- Born: Gary Lee Clark Jr. February 15, 1984 (age 42); Austin, Texas, U.S.
- Genres: Blues rock; hard rock; soul; R&B
- Occupations: Musician; singer; songwriter
- Instruments: Vocals; guitar
- Years active: 1996–present
- Labels: Hotwire Unlimited; Warner
- Website: garyclarkjr.com

Gary Lee Clark Jr. (born February 15, 1984) is an American guitarist and singer who fuses blues, rock and soul music with elements of hip hop. In 2011, Clark signed with Warner Bros. Records and released The Bright Lights EP. It was followed by the albums Blak and Blu (2012) and The Story of Sonny Boy Slim (2015). Throughout his career, Clark has been a prolific live performer, documented by Gary Clark Jr. Live (2014) and Gary Clark Jr Live/North America (2017).

In 2014, Clark was awarded a Grammy for Best Traditional R&B performance for the song "Please Come Home". In 2020, he won the Grammy Award for "Best Rock Song" and "Best Rock Performance" for the song "This Land" from that album. His most recent album, JPEG Raw, was released in 2024.

== Career ==
=== Early career ===
Born and raised in Austin, Texas, Clark got his first guitar as a Christmas present when he was 13, an Ibanez RX20. He taught himself to play guitar by checking out how-to-play-guitar books at the Covington Middle School library and by listening to Green Day, Nirvana, Jimmy Reed and Stevie Ray Vaughan. Clark played small gigs throughout his teens until he met promoter Clifford Antone, proprietor of the Austin music club Antone's. Antone's was the launch pad where Jimmie and Stevie Ray Vaughan redefined blues at the time. After meeting Clifford, Clark began to perform with other musicians, including Jimmie Vaughan. Vaughan and others in the Austin music community helped Clark in his musical career.

Clark sang on the 2010 bonus track cover of the Jackson 5's "I Want You Back" on Sheryl Crow's album 100 Miles from Memphis.

Rolling Stone declared Clark "Best Young Gun" in its April 2011, "Best of Rock" issue.

=== 2012–2014: Collaborations, Blak and Blu, and Gary Clark Jr. Live ===
In 2012, Clark recorded with Alicia Keys on two different songs. He co-wrote the song "Fire We Make" with Keys, Pop Wansel and Oak Felder for the album Girl on Fire.

On August 28, 2012, Keys revealed via Twitter that Clark's new album and major label debut called Blak and Blu would be released on October 22, 2012. Released by Warner Bros. Records, Blak and Blu peaked at number six on the Billboard 200 album chart, and number one on the Blues Albums chart.

In 2014, Clark's first live album, Gary Clark Jr. Live, was released. A double album recorded over the course of an 18-month-tour between 2013 and 2014, Gary Clark Jr. Live received generally positive reviews from critics.

Clark worked with the Foo Fighters on the track "What Did I Do? / God as My Witness" on their 2014 album Sonic Highways recorded at KLRU-TV Studio 6A in Austin.

=== 2015–2018: The Story of Sonny Boy Slim, Live North America 2016, and "Come Together" cover ===
Clark released his album The Story of Sonny Boy Slim on September 11, 2015.

Clark had a guest appearance on Tech N9ne's 2016 album The Storm, providing the chorus for the song "No Gun Control". Clark appeared on Childish Gambino's album "Awaken, My Love!", released that same year, performing the guitar solo on the track "The Night Me and Your Mama Met".

In 2017, Clark released his second live album, Live North America 2016.

Clark collaborated with ZZ Ward on "Ride" from the soundtrack to the 2017 Pixar film Cars 3.

Clark's cover version of the Beatles' 1969 song "Come Together", was released in early 2017. It became his first charting single, appearing on Billboard's Mainstream Rock chart, where it peaked at number 15. Clark's version of "Come Together" was featured in the 2017 Zack Snyder-directed superhero film Justice League.

In 2018, Clark featured on two songs on Bun B's album Return of the Trill, "Blood on the Dash" and "Gone Away" also featuring Leon Bridges.

Clark was featured on Tom Morello's album The Atlas Underground, providing vocals and guitar on the song "Where It's at Ain't What It Is".

=== 2019 and beyond: This Land and JPEG RAW ===
On January 10, 2019, Clark announced the March 1, 2019, release of his album This Land via Warner Bros. On the same day he released the title song from the album supported by a Savanah Leaf directed music video for the song. This Land was chosen as a 'Favorite Blues Album' by AllMusic. On March 22, 2024 Clark released JPEG RAW.

== Live appearances ==
Clark performed at the 50th Monterey Jazz Festival as part of the promotion for John Sayles' 2007 film Honeydripper. Clark performed at the 2010 Crossroads Guitar Festival. He joined Doyle Bramhall II and Sheryl Crow on stage for their performance with Eric Clapton, and also debuted several original songs.

In June 2011, Clark played at the annual Bonnaroo Music Festival in Manchester, Tennessee, at the Miller Lite On Tap Lounge. On June 10, 2012, Clark again played at Bonnaroo, and his performance was streamed live online via the Bonnaroo MusicFest Channel on YouTube.

In February 2012, Clark performed alongside blues musicians at the Red, White and Blues event at the White House. The event, aired on PBS, included B.B. King, Mick Jagger, Jeff Beck and Buddy Guy, among others. Clark played "Catfish Blues" and "In the Evening (When the Sun Goes Down)", as well as contributing to performances of "Let the Good Times Roll", "Beat Up Old Guitar", "Five Long Years" and "Sweet Home Chicago".

In June 2012, Clark guested with the Dave Matthews Band playing "Can't Stop" and "All Along the Watchtower" at dates in Virginia Beach and Indianapolis and on October 21 and 22, 2012, Clark appeared as the opening act at the Bridge School Benefit Concert, Bridge XXVI. On December 8, 2012, Clark appeared at the Rolling Stones' first US-gig of their 50th anniversary tour at the Barclay's Center in Brooklyn, to perform the Don Nix song "Going Down" with the band. On December 15, 2012, he joined them onstage again to play the same song, along with John Mayer, during the last date of the Stones' mini-tour at the Prudential Center.

On May 13, 2013, Clark opened for Eric Clapton & His Band at the LG Arena, Birmingham, England, and on June 12, 2013, Clark was the guest performer with the Rolling Stones at Boston's TD Garden. Clark joined the Stones in playing the Freddie King tune "Going Down". On June 30, 2013, he appeared on the Avalon stage at the Glastonbury Festival. His performance was declared 'the most electric performance of the festival, knocking the legendary appearance of the Rolling Stones (the previous night) well into second place' and on October 25, 2013, he appeared on long-running British music show Later... with Jools Holland.

On February 9, 2014, Clark performed the Beatles song "While My Guitar Gently Weeps", along with Dave Grohl and Joe Walsh for The Night That Changed America: A Grammy Salute to The Beatles. On February 16, 2014, Clark performed in the NBA All-Star Game Halftime Show with Trombone Shorty, Earth Wind and Fire, Doctor John, and Janelle Monáe. On May 29, 2014, Clark performed at Rock in Rio in Lisbon. Clark performed guitar, as a guest, on an episode of the PBS cable television show Austin City Limits, with the Foo Fighters, that aired on February 7, 2015. He and the Foo Fighters were accompanied by Jimmie Vaughan.

On May 24, 2015, Clark opened for the Rolling Stones at Petco Park in San Diego. On July 4, 2015, played as part of the lineup for the Foo Fighters 20th Anniversary show at RFK Stadium in Washington, D.C. On June 8, 2016, he performed alongside Jon Batiste and Stay Human as musical guest of The Late Show with Stephen Colbert and on June 26, 2016, he performed during West Holts Stage, Glastonbury Festival, and on July 8, 2016, performed on the Preferred One Stage at the Basilica Block Party in Minneapolis.

On January 10, 2019, Clark appeared on The Late Show with Stephen Colbert, on which he performed "This Land" and "Feed the Babies". The latter he performed along with Jon Batiste and Stay Human as a bonus track.

On February 16, 2019, Clark performed "Pearl Cadillac" and "This Land" on NBC's Saturday Night Live.

On February 28, 2019, Clark performed "This Land" on Comedy Central's The Daily Show with Trevor Noah.

On July 7, 2019, Clark opened for the Rolling Stones' concert at Gillette Stadium during their 2019 No Filter Tour. Clark provided guest vocals and guitar with the Stones during their performance of "Ride 'Em on Down".

Clark led the band (and Bruce Springsteen) at the John F. Kennedy Center for the Performing Arts during Jon Stewart's Mark Twain Prize for American Humor ceremony on April 24, 2022.

Clark is scheduled to kick off a 17-date U.S. tour in Reno, Nev. on Feb. 19, 2025, that will conclude in Highland, Calif. on April 25, 2025. He is also set to do three shows in Australia Feb. 14–17, 2025.

== Film and television appearances ==
- Clark starred in John Sayles' 2007 film Honeydripper.
- In 2010, Clark and his band played onscreen in an episode of the television series Friday Night Lights.
- Clark appears with his band performing "Travis County" and "When My Train Pulls In" in the 2014 Jon Favreau film Chef.
- Clark was featured in the 2015 Don Cheadle film Miles Ahead as part of Miles Davis' band.
- Clark was featured in the May 3, 2016 Episode of NCIS: New Orleans (S2 E22) as a Street Performer. Appears in two scenes performing and one scene being interviewed.
- Clark appears playing the songs "If Trouble Was Money" and "Bright Lights" live in a club during the episode "Straighten It Out" of the Netflix series Luke Cage.
- Clark portrays Arthur Crudup in the 2022 Baz Luhrmann film Elvis.
- Clark portrays T-Bone in the 2023 film Sweetwater.

== Awards and recognitions ==
Kirk Watson, the Mayor of Austin, proclaimed May 3, 2001, to be Gary Clark Jr. Day. Clark was seventeen years old at the time. Clark won the Austin Music Award for Best Blues and Electric Guitarist, on three different occasions.

Clark was Spin's breakout artist for the month of November 2011.

Rolling Stone magazine ranked Clark's Bright Lights EP (named for the title track, an homage to Jimmy Reed and his song of the same name), number 40 on its list of its top 50 albums of 2011.

While playing music festivals such as Coachella, JazzFest, Memphis Beale St., Hangout, High Sierra, Sasquatch, Mountain Jam, Wakarusa, Bonnaroo, Electric Forest, Hard Rock Calling, Newport Folk Festival, Orion Music Festival, Osheaga, Lollapalooza, and ACL Music Festival, Clark was awarded Spin Magazine's Golden Corndog award for performing in more major North American music festivals in 2012 than any other musician.

Clark swept the 31st annual Austin Music Awards for 2012–2013, collecting eight awards, he earned the following: Band of the Year, Musician of the Year, Song of the Year – "Ain't Messin Round" (from Blak and Blu), Album of the Year – Blak and Blu, Electric Guitarist of the Year, Songwriter of the Year, Blues/Soul/Funk Artist of the Year, Male Vocalist of the Year.

In 2014 and 2015, Clark won a Blues Music Award in the 'Contemporary Blues Male Artist of the Year' category.

As of 2020, Clark has been nominated for six Grammy Awards, and has won four of them.

=== Grammy Awards ===
Year	Nominee / work	Award	Result
2014	"Please Come Home"	Best Traditional R&B Performance	Won
2014	"Ain't Messin' 'Round"	Best Rock Song	Nominated
2020	This Land	Best Contemporary Blues Album	Won
2020	"This Land"	Best Rock Performance	Won
2020	"This Land"	Best Rock Song	Won
2020	"This Land"	Best Music Video	Nominated

== Instruments ==
Gary Clark Jr. mainly uses Epiphone Casino, both P-90 and Humbucker Gibson SG, and both Fender Stratocaster and Fender Telecaster electric guitars, as well as Epiphone Masterbilt and Gibson Hummingbird acoustic guitars. Clark has his own signature Blak & Blu Epiphone Casino which features Gibson USA made P-90 pickups.

Clark uses .011-.049 D'Addario Strings EXL 115.

Clark uses a Fender Vibro-King amp purchased from King Zapata (who currently tours with him and plays rhythm guitar) paired with a Fender Princeton. He is known for extensive use of fuzz pedals, with his most frequently used pedal being the Fulltone Octafuzz, and regular use of a wah pedal.

== Personal life ==
Clark married Australian model Nicole Trunfio in 2016. They have three children. In late 2016, Clark and Trunfio purchased a 50-acre horse ranch in Kyle, Texas. A series of racist questions from a neighbor about Clark's ownership of the ranch served as inspiration for the song "This Land."

=== Charity ===
Clark performed at Alicia Keys' Keep a Child Alive Black Ball benefit, in an effort to raise money for children with AIDS in Africa. The two performed the Beatles' "While My Guitar Gently Weeps" as a tribute to George Harrison.

== Discography ==
=== Studio albums ===
Title	Peak positions						
Title	US	AUS	FRA	GER	NLD	NZ	UK
Worry No More: Released: 2001; Label: Hotwire Unlimited	—	—	—	—	—	—	—
110: Released: 2004; Label: Hotwire Unlimited	—	—	—	—	—	—	—
Blak and Blu: Released: October 22, 2012; Label: Warner Bros.	6	34	93	37	6	6	44
The Story of Sonny Boy Slim: Released: September 11, 2015; Label: Warner Bros.	8	18	126	74	10	13	40
This Land: Released: February 22, 2019; Label: Warner Bros.	6	23	139	36	50	—	97
JPEG Raw: Released: March 22, 2024; Label: Warner	—	—	—	—	—	—	—

=== Live albums ===
Title	Peak positions					
Title	US	AUS	BEL	FRA	NLD	UK
Gary Clark Jr. Live: Released: September 23, 2014; Label: Warner Bros.	26	55	95	159	94	159
Live North America 2016: Released: March 17, 2017; Label: Warner Bros.	80	32	71	—	—	—

=== EPs ===
Title and details	Notes
Gary Clark Jr. EP: Type: EP; Released: 2010; Label: Hotwire Unlimited	1. Intro (1:37); 2. Bright Lights (5:12); 3. Don't Owe You a Thang (3:33); 4. Please Come Home (5:04); 5. The Life (4:38); 6. Things Are Changing (3:49); 7. Outro (4:49); 8. Breakdown (4:16)
The Bright Lights EP: Type: EP; Released: August 9, 2011; Label: Warner Bros.	1. Bright Lights (5:24); 2. Don't Owe You a Thang (3:35); 3. Things Are Changin' (Live) [Solo Acoustic] (4:31); 4. When My Train Pulls In (Live) [Solo Acoustic] (8:13)
The Bright Lights EP Australian Tour Edition: Type: EP; Released: 2012; Label: Warner Bros.	1. Bright Lights (5:24); 2. Don't Owe You a Thang (3:35); 3. Things Are Changin' (Live) [Solo Acoustic] (4:31); 4. When My Train Pulls In (Live) [Solo Acoustic] (8:13); 5. Third Stone from the Sun / If You Love Me Like You Say – (Live in Charlottesville, VA) (12:32); 6. Bright Lights (Live in London, UK) (10:55)

Others

- 2012 – Gary Clark Jr. Presents Hotwire Unlimited Raw Cuts Vol. 1 – Hotwire Unlimited/Warner Bros. – released April 30, 2012 [U.K. vinyl 45 rpm]
Side A: Third Stone from the Sun / If You Love Me Like You Say (Live in Charlottesville, VA) (12:32) / Side B: Bright Lights (Live in London, UK) (10:55)
- 2013 – Gary Clark Jr. Presents Hotwire Unlimited Raw Cuts Vol. 2 – Warner Bros. – released April 21, 2013 [U.K. vinyl Side A – 33 rpm, Side B – 45 rpm]
Side A: When My Train Pulls In (Live at The DO512 Lounge in Austin, TX) (16:22) / Side B: When My Train Pulls In (Album Version) (7:45)

=== Singles ===
Title	Year	Peak chart positions					Certifications	Album
Title	Year	US AAA	US Alt.	US Main. Rock	US Rock	FRA	Certifications	Album
"Bright Lights"	2012	29	—	—	—	—		Blak and Blu
"Ain't Messin' Around"	2012	10	—	—	—	—		Blak and Blu
"The Healing"	2015	18	—	—	—	—		The Story of Sonny Boy Slim
"Come Together"	2017	—	39	15	7	66		Justice League (soundtrack)
"This Land"	2019	34	—	—	42	—		This Land
"What About Us"	2019	—	—	25	—	—		This Land
"Wild" (with John Legend)	2020	—	—	—	—	—	RMNZ: Gold	Bigger Love
"—" denotes a recording that did not chart or was not released in that territory.

=== Guest appearances ===
- Booker T. Jones – "Austin City Blues" on Sound the Alarm (2013)
- The-Dream – "Too Early" on IV Play (2013)
- Talib Kweli – "Demonology" (featuring Big K.R.I.T.) on Gravitas (2013)
- Foo Fighters – "What Did I Do? / God As My Witness" on Sonic Highways (2014)
- Tech N9ne – "No Gun Control" (featuring Krizz Kaliko) on The Storm (2016)
- Childish Gambino – "The Night Me And Your Mama Met" on "Awaken, My Love!" (2016)
- ZZ Ward – "Ride" on Cars 3 soundtrack (2017)
- Trae Tha Truth – "I'm on 3.0" (featuring T.I., Dave East, Tee Grizzley, Royce Da 5'9, Curren$y, DRAM, Snoop Dogg, Fabolous, Rick Ross, Chamillionaire, G-Eazy, Styles P, E-40 & Mark Morrison) on The Truth, Pt. 3 (2017)
- Tom Morello – "What It's At Ain't What It Is" (featuring Nico Stadi) on The Atlas Underground (2018)
- Sir Sly – "Citizen" (2020)
- Slash – "Crossroads" on Orgy of the Damned (2024)

=== Mixtapes ===
- 2014 – Blak and Blu The Mixtape – presented by D-Nice – released April 30, 2014
