= This Land (song) =

2019 single by Gary Clark Jr.

Single by Gary Clark Jr.

from the album This Land
- Released: January 10, 2019
- Genre: Blues rock
- Length: 5:42
- Label: Warner Bros.
- Songwriters: Gary Clark Jr.; Woody Guthrie
- Producers: Gary Clark Jr.; Jacob Sciba

Gary Clark Jr. singles chronology
"Come Together" (2017)	"This Land" (2019)	"What About Us" (2019)

"This Land" is a song by American blues rock artist Gary Clark Jr., from his fourth studio album of the same name. The song was released on January 10, 2019, as the album's lead single, through Warner Bros. Records. An official music video was released the same day. "This Land" received positive reviews from music critics, and won both Best Rock Performance and Best Rock Song at the 62nd Annual Grammy Awards.

== Background and production ==
Clark Jr. recorded the track, as well as most of the This Land album, with a Gibson SG electric guitar plugged into a César Díaz amplifier and a Marshall speaker cabinet.

== Composition and lyrics ==
"This Land" is a blues rock song, rooted in a reggae-style vamp with blues guitar licks.

"This Land" was inspired by an incident in which Clark's neighbor repeatedly asked who lived on the singer's 50 acres (20 ha) property in Austin, Texas, and would not believe that Clark, a Black man, owned the home.

The lyrics make several references to other songs and aspects of American culture. One of the opening lines, "Fifty acres and Model A", reflect the promise of forty acres and a mule to be given to families of freed American slaves, while the title of the song is a direct reference to the famous Woody Guthrie folk song "This Land Is Your Land". Clark Jr., who previously chose to stay away from making overtly political music, used the works of Guthrie, Big Bill Broonzy, and Lead Belly as inspiration for "This Land".

== Critical reception ==
Music critics who reviewed This Land tended to emphasize the differences between the title track and the rest of the album. Writing for Pitchfork, Stephen Thomas Erlewine praised the way that Clark Jr. was able to "[channel] his anger over this casual racism into a dose of fury so controlled, its origin becomes obscured", but mentioned that the track "isn't necessarily a harbinger for the rest of" the album.

== Music video ==
An official music video for "This Land" was released the same day as the song. Directed by Savanah Leaf, the video was filmed on Clark Jr.'s Texas property and depicts a young boy surrounded by symbols of American racism, such as the Confederate battle flag.

== Accolades ==
"This Land" was nominated for three awards at the 62nd Annual Grammy Awards in 2019: Best Rock Performance, Best Rock Song, and Best Music Video. It won the former two, and lost the latter to "Old Town Road" by Lil Nas X and Billy Ray Cyrus.

Awards and nominations for "This Land"
Year	Organization	Award	Result	Ref.
2020	62nd Annual Grammy Awards	Best Rock Performance	Won	
2020	62nd Annual Grammy Awards	Best Rock Song	Won	
2020	62nd Annual Grammy Awards	Best Music Video	Nominated	

== Live performances ==
Clark Jr. first performed "This Land" live on January 10, 2019, with a performance on The Late Show with Stephen Colbert. He also debuted "Feed the Babies", another song from This Land, accompanied by Jon Batiste and the Stay Human house band. On February 16, 2019, Clark Jr. performed "This Land" and "Pearl Cadillac" when he starred as the weekly musical guest on Saturday Night Live. He next performed the song live at the 62nd Annual Grammy Awards, with The Roots serving as his backing band. Clark Jr. performed against a backdrop of an Antebellum-era mansion, with flames growing higher in the background.

== Personnel ==
Music

- Gary Clark Jr. – lead vocals, guitar, keyboards
- Mike Elizondo – bass guitar, synthesizer
- Brannen Temple – drums

Technical

- Gary Clark Jr. – producer, engineer, executive producer, programmer
- Jacob Sciba – producer, engineer, mixing engineer
- Joseph Holguin – engineer
- Gabe Burch – assistant engineer
- Scooter Weintraub – executive producer
- Howie Weinberg – mastering engineer

Credits adapted from Tidal.

== Charts ==
Weekly chart performance for "This Land"
Chart (2019)	Peak position
US Adult Alternative Airplay (Billboard)	34
US Hot Rock & Alternative Songs (Billboard)	42
