= Bulls of Prey =

Budapest rock band

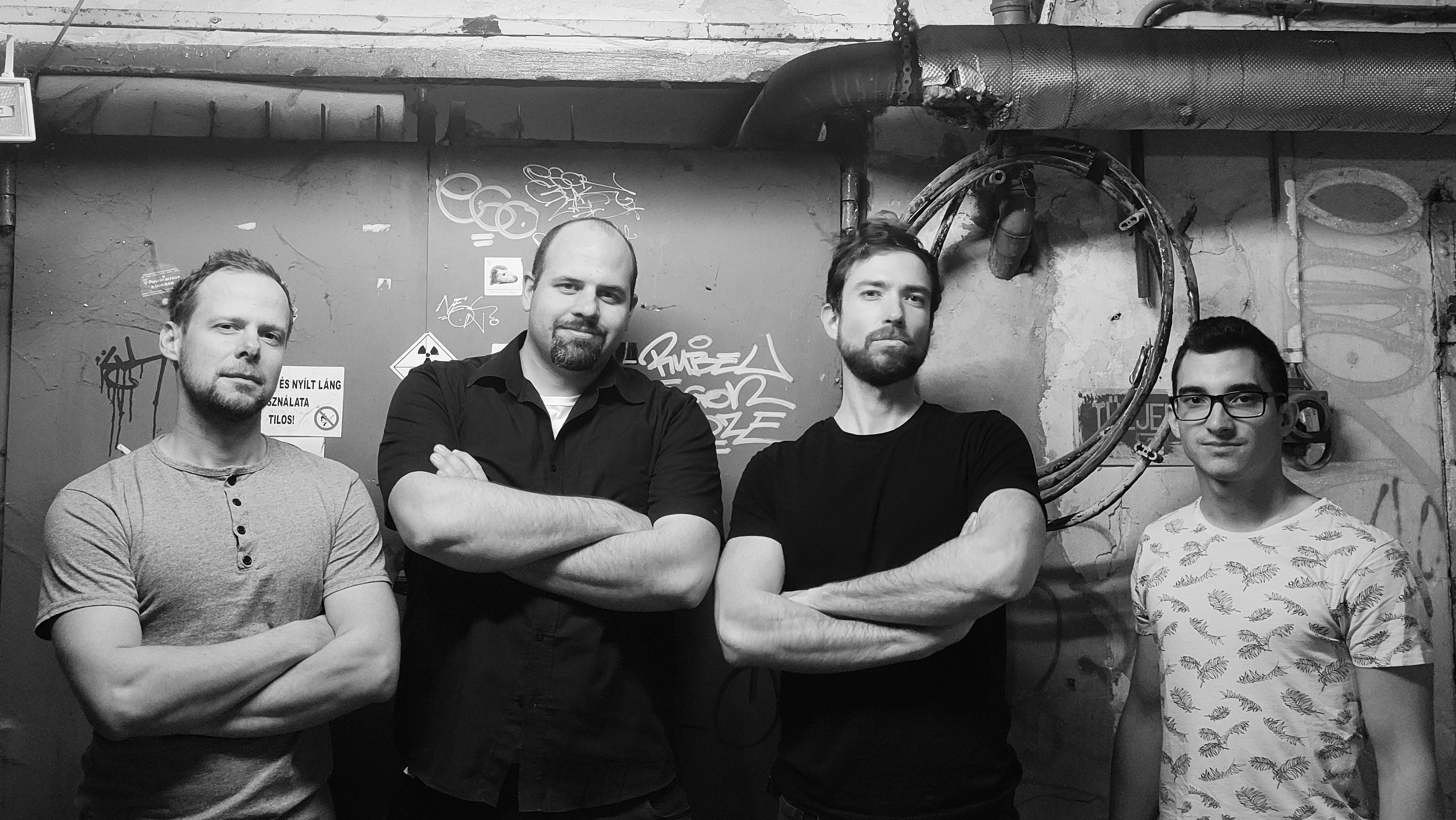
Bulls of Prey, 2021

Bulls of Prey is a Hungarian rock band, residing in Budapest. The group was formed by Bálint L. Tóth with the aim of bringing blues rock musicians together to create and perform heavy rock and roll / blues music. The four piece formation primarily plays their own compositions, which are inspired by the spirit and sound of the hard rock, blues rock and southern rock genres of the 1970s.

== History ==
Bulls of Prey was founded by Bálint L. Tóth (guitar, vocals) in 2017, who brought together experienced and skilled hobby musicians, who did not know each other before, but had the same passion and taste in music. The then-unnamed band initially played covers of material by Jimi Hendrix, Dire Straits, Deep Purple, Tina Turner, Led Zeppelin, and Joe Bonamassa, among others. After many months of existing without a proper band name, the musicians, who had become friends by then, began to invent an identity and brand to the four piece group. Bálint L. Tóth suggested using the title of the song "Birds of Prey" by Deep Purple as a band name. However, since there was already a band with that name, the musicians started changing the word 'bird' to another animal. At last, bassist Zoltán Zakar came up with the term 'Bulls of Prey'. Founding member Bálint L. Tóth completed his 12-year studies at the Vikár Sándor Music School of Nyíregyháza, majoring in clarinet performance. He created his first garage rock band at the age of 16, then from the age of 20 he played as a solo guitarist in various Budapest-based heavy metal, latin rock, jazz, and ska punk formations. From 2015 to 2018, besides Hungary, Tóth performed gigs in Austria, the Czech Republic, Germany, the Netherlands, Poland, and Slovakia, as the solo guitarist in the bands EgoLegio and Rainbow Puke. In mid 2021, the Royal Ballet Fehérvár performed Italian-Hungarian choreographer Elisa Insalata's contemporary dance piece titled "Láthatatlan (H)arc" (Invisible face/fight), whose music was composed by Bálint L. Tóth.

Born to Vojvodina, Serbia, Áron Tamás (drums) is the second permanent and youngest member of Bulls of Prey. Tamás completed his classical and popular music studies in Subotica, played drums and percussion in several Serbia-based and Budapest-based formations, including OffGround. Currently, besides Bulls of Prey, he is a session musician in various pop-rock formations. His playing is inspired by the rhythm section of the bands Slipknot, Metallica, and Iron Maiden. Zoltán Zakar (bass guitar) from Budapest is an alumnus of the Kőbányai Zenei Stúdió. He learnt from several figures of the Hungarian rock and roll musical scene, like Egon Póka, among others, whose style and sound had a special impact on Zakar's playing. Playing bass in the band (R)Evolution, Zakar performed gigs all over Hungary, made acquaintances and shared the stage with many well-known Hungarian and foreign musicians. In November 2022, Zoltán Zakar was elected as the best bass player of the 25th Paks Pop-Rock-Jazz Festival. Zsolt Berecz (guitar) from Tiszaújváros is the newest member of Bulls of Prey, who brought a new color and energy to the band at the beginning of 2019. Berecz, who used to travel for longer or shorter periods in various places around the world (India, Israel, and Turkey) with a team of acrobats jugglers, soon became the band's most experimental musician. His major influences are Joe Bonamassa, Steve Vai, and Stevie Ray Vaughan.

Bulls of Prey released their first single "Hard-assed Queen" in October 2019, which was followed by two other singles in late 2020 ("Kingdom of the End" and "Out of my Hands"). The band's first EP debuted in November 2021 with the title Believer. The release contains the title track, the opener "Golden Calf", the instrumental takes of their former recording "Out of my Hands" and the title track "Believer", as well as a live version of their cover of Sia's 2016 hit "Cheap Thrills".

Bulls of Prey often shares the stage with bands playing different kinds of music. In September 2021, for instance, they performed with the Pécs-based Hungarian hardcore metal band called Frust_HATE and the Georgian hardcore and groove metal group Deadsec. Bulls of Prey often plays shows with the Hungarian bands Allen Memories, Rainbow Puke, and Szevaszuram, with whom they became friends throughout the years.

In November 2022, by winning the best rock band and third best band awards at the 25th Paks Pop-Rock-Jazz Festival, Bulls of Prey was invited to perform at the 26th Antal Légrádi Rock Festival in Balatonboglár in March 2023.

In June 2023, Dorina Petneházi joined the band as the fifth member. The arrival of the singer reduced the average age of the band. The presence of Dorina Petneházi opened up new possibilities for Bulls of Prey in terms of backing vocals and harmonies.

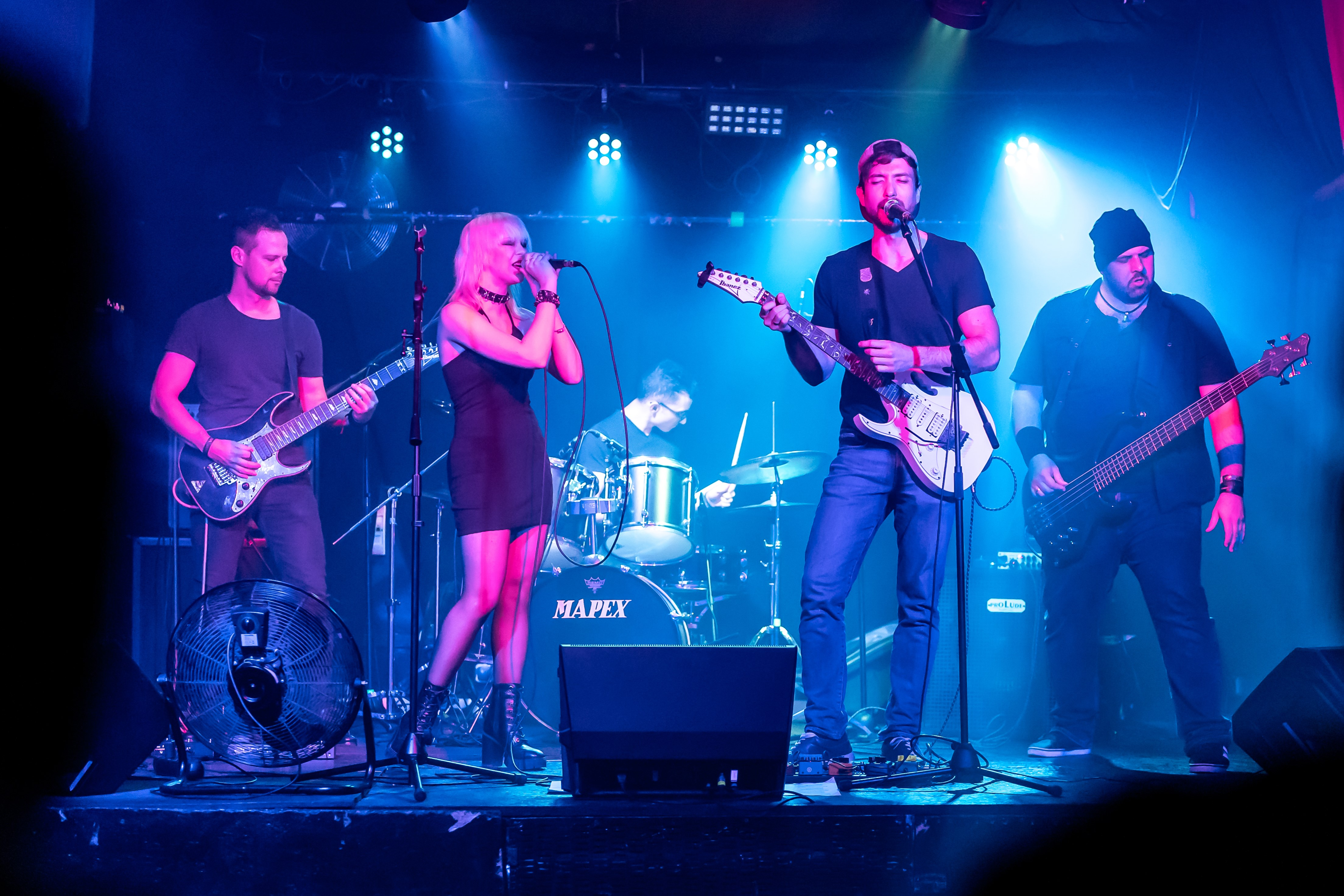
Live gig at S8 Underground, Budapest (2023)

After three singles, an EP, and a live album, the band released a new mini-album in October 2024. The EP titled Born Again features six brand new compositions (five new studio tracks and a live recording). As a novelty, two songs on the album were written and performed in Hungarian, for the first time in Bulls of Prey's history. In addition to the bluesy soulful title song, there is a southern rock tune, an RnB kind-of unconventional love song, a socially critical piece with a punk-rock feel to it, as well as a more traditional blues-rock track on the EP. The closing composition (the live recording) is also the swan song of the band's lead guitarist. Zsolt Berecz, has decided to suspend his membership in Bulls of Prey indefinitely to concentrate on pursuing his family and career goals. In November 2024, by winning the third best band award at the 27th Paks Pop-Rock-Jazz Festival, Bulls of Prey was once again invited to perform at the Antal Légrádi Rock Festival in Balatonboglár.

== Philosophy and sound ==
According to their self-definition, Bulls of Prey creates playful, energetic instrumental music, with vocal accompaniment. So, although the lyrics are endowed with vivid symbolism and have strong rhythmical role as well, they are of secondary importance from the point of view of the musical message. The English-language texts either interpret typical rock and roll feelings or transmit thought-provoking philosophical, ontological visions.

Asked about what music meant to him, guitarist Zsolt Berecz said "[m]aking music is a completely different dimension, where I can literally transform into sounds and melodies. I love experiencing this transition. In a band, the individual dissolves and melts into a brand new common musical compound. You complement each other's ideas and playing thus creating a common composition. This pulsating and lively process is one of the most addictive things in my opinion". To the same question Bálint L. Tóth replied: "Countless happiness hormones are released in the brain when you're creating. It's priceless to go through the phase called 'in statu nascendi' and to experience the way a new song finally acquires its final form through a change of state".

== Line-ups ==
=== Mark I (2018–2023) ===
- Zsolt BERECZ: Guitar
- Áron TAMÁS: Drums
- Bálint L. TÓTH: Guitar, Vocals
- Zoltán ZAKAR: Bass

=== Mark II (2023–2024) ===
- Zsolt BERECZ: Guitar
- Dorina PETNEHÁZI: Vocals
- Áron TAMÁS: Drums
- Bálint L. TÓTH: Guitar, Vocals
- Zoltán ZAKAR: Bass

=== Mark III (2024– ) ===
- Dorina PETNEHÁZI: Vocals
- Áron TAMÁS: Drums, percussion
- Bálint L. TÓTH: Guitar, Vocals
- Zoltán ZAKAR: Bass

== Discography ==
- "Hard-assed Queen" (Single), 2019
- "Kingdom Of The End" (Single), 2020
- "Out of my Hands" (Single), 2020
- "Believer" (EP), 2021
- "Live Takes" (Live album), 2022
- "Born Again" (EP), 2024

== Awards ==
- Third Best Band (XXVII. Pop-Rock-Jazz Festival of Paks)
- Special Award for Singers (XXVII. Pop-Rock-Jazz Festival of Paks)
- Third Best Band (XXV. Pop-Rock-Jazz Festival of Paks)
- Best Bass Player (XXV. Pop-Rock-Jazz Festival of Paks)
