= Blak and Blu =

2012 album by Gary Clark, Jr.

Studio album by Gary Clark Jr.
- Released: October 22, 2012
- Recorded: 2011–2012
- Genre: Blues rock; neo-soul; R&B; hard rock
- Length: 66:55
- Label: Warner Bros.
- Producer: Gary Clark Jr.; Mike Elizondo; Rob Cavallo; Tim Kelley

Gary Clark Jr. chronology
Blak and Blu (2012)	Gary Clark Jr. Live (2014)

Singles from Blak and Blu
- 1. "Ain't Messin 'Round" Released: September 18, 2012; 2. "Numb" Released: October 2, 2012

Blak and Blu is the major-label debut studio album by American musician Gary Clark Jr., released on October 22, 2012. The album touches on a wide variety of traditionally black music genres, including soul ("Please Come Home"), hip-hop/R&B ("The Life"), Chuck Berry-esque rock and roll ("Travis County"), and Clark's trademark, blues ("When My Train Pulls In", "Numb", "Next Door Neighbor Blues").

Blak and Blu netted Clark his first two Grammy Award nominations, one for Best Rock Song ("Ain't Messin Round") and the other for Best Traditional R&B Performance ("Please Come Home") which won. This marked the first time that an artist was nominated in both categories in the same year. It peaked at number six on the Billboard 200 album chart, and number one on the Blues Albums chart.

== Critical reception ==
Professional ratings
Review scores
Source	Rating
Allmusic	4/5 stars
Chicago Tribune	2.5/4 stars
Antiquiet	4.5/5 stars
Ventvox	2.5/5 stars
Rolling Stone	3.5/5 stars
Sputnikmusic	3.8 out of 5

Blak and Blu was awarded a three-and-a-half star rating by Rolling Stone and was listed at No. 27 on Rolling Stone's list of the top 50 albums of 2012, in which the author said "Clark's brain-frying guitar solos are more about noise nuance and phrasing than speed-trial note-spitting." The Chicago Tribune gave the album a 2.5 out of 4 review, stating that the album lacked cohesiveness and consistency due to the wide variety of genres featured.

In 2013, Blak and Blu was nominated for a Blues Music Award in the 'Contemporary Blues Album' category.

== Track listing ==
All songs written by Gary Clark Jr., except as noted.

No.	Title	Writer(s)	Length
1.	"Ain't Messin 'Round"		4:09
2.	"When My Train Pulls In"		7:45
3.	"Blak and Blu"	Gary Clark Jr., Gil Scott-Heron, Brian Jackson, Don Robey	4:06
4.	"Bright Lights"		5:24
5.	"Travis County"		3:38
6.	"The Life"		5:05
7.	"Glitter Ain't Gold (Jumpin' for Nothin')"	Gary Clark Jr., Doyle Bramhall II, Justin Stanley, Ali Tamposi, Mike Elizondo	4:18
8.	"Numb"		5:26
9.	"Please Come Home"		4:16
10.	"Things Are Changin'"		3:59
11.	"Third Stone from the Sun/If You Love Me Like You Say"	Jimi Hendrix, Little Johnny Taylor	9:37
12.	"You Saved Me"		6:11
13.	"Next Door Neighbor Blues"		3:01
Total length:			66:55

Deluxe version bonus tracks
No.	Title	Length
14.	"Breakdown"	4:11
15.	"Soul"	6:15

== Blak and Blu The Mixtape ==
Blak and Blu The Mixtape

Mixtape by Gary Clark Jr. presented by D-Nice
- Released: April 30, 2014
- Recorded: 2013–2014
- Genre: Hip hop, R&B, pop, indie pop
- Producer: D-Nice

On April 30, 2014, Gary Clark Jr. also released a mixtape of the songs under the title Blak and Blu The Mixtape presented by D-Nice.

=== Track list ===
No.	Title	Length
1.	"Blak and Blu" (feat. Big K.R.I.T.)	3:27
2.	"The Life (Gary Clark Jr EP Version)"	1:34
3.	"The Life (Robert Glasper Remix)"	1:57
4.	"Bright Lights" (feat. Talib Kweli)	3:37
5.	"Soul (Bonus Track from Blak and Blu)"	3:49
6.	"When My Train Pulls In (Big K.R.I.T. Remix)"	4:28
7.	"Things Are Changin (Bright Lights EP Version)"	3:25
8.	"Numb" (feat. Bilal)	2:37
9.	"Please Come Home" (feat. Alice Smith)	4:19

== Personnel ==
- Gary Clark Jr. – lead and backing vocals, lead and rhythm guitar, bass, drums, programming, trumpet, percussion, congas
- Eric Zapata – rhythm guitars
- Mike Elizondo – bass, fuzz guitar, keyboards, percussion, programming
- Zac Rae – Keyboards, hammond organ, wurlitzer, piano, vibraphone
- J.J. Johnson – drums, percussion
- Scott Nelson – bass
- Satnam Ramgotra – tabla, percussion
- Danny T. Levin – trumpet, trombone, flugelhorn
- David Moyer – tenor saxophone, baritone saxophone
- Stevie Black – strings
- Recording engineers: Adam Hawkins, Doug McKean
- Mixing: Adam Hawkins, Doug McKean
- Assistant engineers: Brent Arrowood, Chris Sporleder, Russ Waugh
- Mastering: Ted Jensen
- A&R: Lenny Waronker
- Creative design, direction and photography: Frank Maddocks

== Charts ==
Chart (2012–13)	Peak position
Australian Albums (ARIA)	34
Austrian Albums (Ö3 Austria)	38
Belgian Albums (Ultratop Flanders)	30
Belgian Albums (Ultratop Wallonia)	69
Finnish Albums (Suomen virallinen lista)	23
French Albums (SNEP)	93
New Zealand Albums (RMNZ)	6
Swiss Albums (Schweizer Hitparade)	52
