= Workout Holiday LP =

Workout Holiday

Studio album by White Denim
- Released: June 23, 2008 EU
- Recorded: 2007
- Genre: Garage rock; experimental rock; dub; indie rock
- Length: 37:28
- Label: Full Time Hobby
- Producer: White Denim

White Denim chronology
Workout Holiday & RCRD LBL EP (2007)	Workout Holiday (2008)	Exposion (2008)

Professional ratings
Aggregate scores
Source	Rating
Metacritic	76/100
Review scores
Source	Rating
NME	(8/10)
Uncut Magazine	4/5 stars

Workout Holiday LP is the debut album by rock band White Denim. After signing to the band's first record label, Full Time Hobby, in early 2008, White Denim first released the single "Let's Talk About It" on April 28 in Europe. The band followed the single with the release of its first full-length album entitled Workout Holiday to European listeners on June 23, 2008. The LP shares the same name as their nine-song Tour EP; however, it features newly re-recorded versions of songs from both the Workout Holiday EP as well as the Let's Talk About It EP.

== Track listing ==
1. "Let's Talk About It" - 3:53
2. "Shake Shake Shake" - 2:37
3. "Sitting" - 2:16
4. "I Can Tell" - 1:57
5. "Mess Your Hair Up" - 4:48
6. "Heart From Us All" - 3:10
7. "All You Really Have to Do" - 2:48
8. "Look That Way at It" - 3:25
9. "Darksided Computer Mouth" - 2:15
10. "WDA" - 3:03
11. "Don't Look That Way at It" - 4:03
12. "IEIEI" - 3:13

A 2 disc limited-edition version is also available, with the second disc containing 5 bonus tracks.

1. "Sitting" (Original Demo Version) - 3:41
2. "Transparency" - 2:29
3. "You Can't Say" - 2:43
4. "All Truckers Roll" - 2:39
5. "Migration Wind" - 4:36

=== Videos ===
- "Let's Talk About It" on YouTube Music video that was directed by Carlos LaRotta, shot and edited by Trey Cartwright, both of Birds-on-Fire Film
- "All You Really Have To Do" on YouTube Official video posted by Full Time Hobby Records
- "Shake Shake Shake" on YouTube Official video posted by Full Time Hobby Records
- "Look That Way At It" on YouTube - Collaboration with The Modern Plow Collective
- "IEIEI" - Video was shot by White Denim, animation by Jason Archer, edited by Jason Archer and Carlos LaRotta, for Birds on Fire Film.

== Personnel ==
- James Petralli: Vocals, guitar
- Joshua Block: Drums
- Steve Terebecki: Vocals, bass
