= D (White Denim album) =

Studio album by White Denim
- Released: 24 May 2011
- Recorded: 2011
- Studios: Lakeside Studio and at Mob House in Austin, Texas
- Genres: Indie rock; garage rock; progressive rock; psychedelic rock; Southern rock
- Length: 37:00
- Label: Downtown
- Producers: White Denim, Mike McCarthy

White Denim chronology
Last Day of Summer (2010)	D (2011)	Corsicana Lemonade (2013)

D is the fourth full-length studio album by the Texan band White Denim, released by Downtown Records on May 24, 2011, to wide critical acclaim.

== History ==
After their third studio album, Fits, White Denim made some changes: they expanded from a power trio to a four-piece, adding a second guitarist Austin Jenkins and came to use a more sophisticated studio. "First and foremost the gear we were using, it kind of brought out different performances. Before we were in a trailer, using a lot of lo-fi equipment to try to stretch it out, and with this one we played in a really nice studio and had access to things we hadn’t before, and we were kind of hearing everything much more clearly and it got different performances out of us," James Petralli said in an interview. This new approach, according to Allmusic, resulted in a work marked by "warmer, acoustic spirit and a more expansive, swirly psychedelic style".

Speaking of a newcomer, James Petralli credited Jenkins with having "brought a lightness and sense of humor back to the group". "I think for a short while we were running the risk of losing that, which is crazy because fun and laughter have always been such an essential part of our collaboration," the singer/guitarist added. He discarded any doubts concerning the 'studio experience' which might have had any detrimental effect upon a band's collective psyche: "I don't feel like any of the 'soul' was lost. The quality of the equipment and environment should have an impact on the music, and it certainly did on this record".

== Critical reception ==
Professional ratings
Aggregate scores
Source	Rating
Metacritic	79/100
Review scores
Source	Rating
AllMusic	4.5/5 stars
BBC Music	7.5/10 stars
Bowlegs Music	9/10 stars
Clash Magazine	8/10 stars
Drowned in Sound	6/10 stars
entertainment.ie	9/10 stars
The Guardian	4/5 stars
The Independent	5/5 stars
Mojo	4/5 stars
New Musical Express	7/10 stars
Popmatters	8/10 stars
Q	4/5 stars
Rolling Stone	4/5 stars
State	8.5/10 stars
Uncut	4/5 stars

Upon its release, D received critical acclaim from music critics. Aggregating website AnyDecentMusic? reports a score of 7.7 based on 22 professional reviews.

AllMusic calls this "laboriously constructed" album "a masterpiece". The new production value (and occasional flute solo or dreamy string arrangement) did "nothing to water down the band's muscular interplay," according to Jason Lymangrover. A reviewer calls bassist Steve Terebecki and drummer Josh Block "one of the most badass rhythm sections this side of Mitch Mitchell and Noel Redding", and praises guitarists Jenkins and James Petralli for playing off one another perfectly, "intertwining jazzy guitar noodling, prog scales, and rock riffs." "Everything is tightly structured, and melodies are of the highest importance, especially in the album's explosive single 'Drug,' which blends a raw groove and Southern Americana slack along with Summer of Love lyrics," the critic writes.

According to Rolling Stone, White Denim are "...like a jam band that refuses to be boring", mixing sublimely "psychedelia, hardblues, boogie, prog rock and fusion riffs like inspired kids weaned on 64GB iPods and 64-ounce Slurpees" in a way that "often recalls late-Sixties Grateful Dead, when their songs still had garage-rock drive but were exploding every which way." "The freakouts are mathematically calibrated, come with joyous hooks, and can coalesce into something conventionally heroic," notes Uncut magazine. The album has been described as "White Denim's most thrillingly off-kilter record to date" and "another joyous rampage through rock's dusty attic" by Mojo and Q critics, respectively.

Uncut placed the album at number 4 on its list of "Top 50 albums of 2011", while Mojo, NME, and Rolling Stone ranked it 6, 37, and 46, respectively. This album peaked #16 on the top heatseekers albums chart. The album was also included in the book 1001 Albums You Must Hear Before You Die.

== Track listing ==
All songs written and arranged by White Denim, except for "Burnished", written by White Denim and Lucas Anderson, and "Keys", written by White Denim with string arrangement by Jonathan Geer.

No.	Title	Length
1.	"It's Him!"	3:23
2.	"Burnished"	2:36
3.	"At the Farm"	3:59
4.	"Street Joy"	3:36
5.	"Anvil Everything"	4:00
6.	"River to Consider"	5:00
7.	"Drug"	3:04
8.	"Bess St."	3:40
9.	"Is and Is and Is"	3:45
10.	"Keys"	4:03
Total length:		37:00

== Personnel ==
- James Petralli – vocals, guitars
- Austin Jenkins – guitars
- Steven Terebecki – bass guitar
- Joshua Block – drums and percussion, mixing engineer (tracks 1, 2, 3, 6 and 8)
- Danny Reisch – engineer
- Mike McCarthy – producer, engineer (track 7), mixing engineer (tracks 4, 5, 7, 9 and 10)
- Jim Vollentine – assistant engineer
- Alex Coke – flute (track 6)
- Heather Anderson – viola (track 10)
- Amy Harris – viola (track 10)
- Elizabeth S. Lee – cello (track 10)
- Brian Hall – violin (track 10)
- Emily Lazar – mastering engineer
- Joe LaPorta – mastering engineer
- Michael Hammett – artwork designer, photography
- Bobby Weiss – photography
