= This Land (Gary Clark Jr. album) =

2019 album by Gary Clark Jr.

Studio album by Gary Clark Jr.
- Released: February 22, 2019
- Studio: Arlyn Studios
- Genres: Blues, rock, R&B, hard rock
- Length: 62:15
- Label: Warner Bros.

Gary Clark Jr. chronology
The Story of Sonny Boy Slim (2015)	This Land (2019)	JPEG Raw (2024)

Singles from This Land
- 1. "This Land" Released: January 10, 2019

Professional ratings
Aggregate scores
Source	Rating
Metacritic	81/100
Review scores
Source	Rating
Allmusic	4/5 stars
Austin Chronicle	3.5/5 stars
Exclaim!	9/10
Paste	7.5/10
Pitchfork	7.9/10
Rolling Stone	3.5/5 stars

This Land is the third studio album by American blues rock musician Gary Clark Jr., and was released on February 22, 2019, by Warner Bros. Records. It won the Grammy Award for Best Contemporary Blues Album in 2020, while the title track won Best Rock Song and Best Rock Performance.

== Background and production ==
Apart from "When I'm Gone," which was recorded on a Fender Stratocaster, Clark Jr. used a Gibson SG electric guitar to record This Land.

== Promotion ==
The album was announced with a video for the lead single "This Land" directed by Austin, Texas-based filmmaker Savanah Leaf. The song and video highlight racism in American society, with Leaf recreating aspects of Clark's childhood as described by the musician to the director, and Clark's response to the policies of President Donald Trump since he was elected in 2016. The track was inspired by "This Land Is Your Land" by Woody Guthrie, with Clark commenting in an interview with American Songwriter: "It’s one of the first songs we learn, and we sing it together ... It's like the Pledge of Allegiance ... And when you're kids, everybody's together. You don't see differences until you get older, and older people influence you to think about other people a certain way. I just want to get back to singing that song like we were kids again, you know?" Writer Dan Solomon, in Texas Monthly, described "This Land" as "perhaps the first truly great song of Clark's career, a defiant, statement-piece anthem that fits alongside pieces like Childish Gambino's "This is America" and Beyoncé's "Formation" in its vocal addressing of racism in America."

Clark started the album's promotional tour in March 2019.

== Commercial performance ==
This Land debuted at number six on the US Billboard 200 with 54,000 album-equivalent units, of which 51,000 were pure album sales. It is his third US top 10 album.

== Track listing ==
All tracks written by Gary Clark Jr.; track 1 co-written by Woody Guthrie.

No.	Title	Length
1.	"This Land"	5:42
2.	"What About Us"	4:30
3.	"I Got My Eyes on You (Locked & Loaded)"	5:11
4.	"I Walk Alone"	3:44
5.	"Feelin’ Like a Million"	3:34
6.	"Gotta Get Into Something"	3:04
7.	"Got to Get Up"	2:37
8.	"Feed the Babies"	4:46
9.	"Pearl Cadillac"	5:05
10.	"When I'm Gone"	3:48
11.	"The Guitar Man"	4:27
12.	"Low Down Rolling Stone"	4:18
13.	"The Governor"	2:21
14.	"Don't Wait 'til Tomorrow"	4:05
15.	"Dirty Dishes Blues"	5:03
Total length:		1:02:15

Bonus tracks
No.	Title	Length
16.	"Highway 71"	3:31
17.	"Did Dat"	6:42
Total length:		1:12:28

== Personnel ==
- Gary Clark Jr. – vocals (all tracks), guitar (all tracks), bass (4–7, 16), keyboards (1–11, 16–17), percussion (5–6)

Additional musicians

- Doyle Bramhall II – lute (17)
- Mike Elizondo – bass (2, 8–12, 14), synth bass (1–3, 11)
- Alex Peterson – bass (17)
- Brannen Temple – drums (1–3, 5, 7–8, 10–11, 13–14, 17)
- J.J. Johnson – drums (4, 6, 9, 12, 15–16)
- Jon Deas – keyboards (4, 11, 14, 17), Hammond organ (12)
- Sheila E. – percussion (4, 8, 10–11, 14, 17)
- Keyon Harrold – horn (7–8)
- Gabe Burch – backing vocals (6–7)
- Scooter Weinbtraub – backing vocals (6)
- Jacob Sciba – backing vocals (2, 7, 12)
- Gaston Jouany – backing vocals (2, 6–7)
- Joseph Holguin – backing vocals (2, 6–7)
- Branko Presley – backing vocals (6)
- Katelyn O'Neal – backing vocals (6)
- Lazaro Zarate – backing vocals (6)
- Mikayla Mundy – backing vocals (6)
- Pam Adams – backing vocals (6)

Technical

- Gabe Burch – engineering
- Gary Clark Jr. – engineering, production, programming
- Jacob Sciba – production, mixing, engineering
- Joseph Angel – production
- Lab Ox – production
- Scooter Weintraub – production
- Mike Elizondo – production
- Howie Weinberg – mastering
- Joseph Holguin – engineering
- Adam Hawkins – engineering

== Charts ==
=== Weekly charts ===
Chart (2019)	Peak position
Australian Albums (ARIA)	23
Austrian Albums (Ö3 Austria)	29
Belgian Albums (Ultratop Flanders)	34
Belgian Albums (Ultratop Wallonia)	116
Canadian Albums (Billboard)	48
Czech Albums (ČNS IFPI)	87
Dutch Albums (Album Top 100)	50
French Albums (SNEP)	139
German Albums (Offizielle Top 100)	36
Hungarian Albums (MAHASZ)	26
Scottish Albums (Official Charts)	28
Spanish Albums (PROMUSICAE)	94
Swiss Albums (Schweizer Hitparade)	15
UK Albums (Official Charts)	97
US Billboard 200	6
US Top Rock Albums (Billboard)	2

=== Year-end charts ===
Chart (2019)	Position
US Top Rock Albums (Billboard)	69
