= Last Day of Summer (White Denim album) =

Studio album by White Denim
- Released: September 23, 2010
- Recorded: 2010
- Genres: Indie rock; psychedelic rock
- Length: 38:42
- Labels: Self-released, Downtown Records
- Producer: White Denim

White Denim chronology
| Fits (2009) | Last Day of Summer (2010) | D (2011) |

Last Day of Summer is a collection of tracks self-released by the garage rock/psychedelic band White Denim on September 23, 2010. The release notes from their official website state: "This record is something we made as a little summer retreat from our ongoing work on the third full length [album]. Many of these tunes have been bouncing around since the formation of the band back in 06. We were super pumped to utilize a few fresh and casual musical approaches on this record." It is available to download for free (with an option to make a donation) from the band's official website. The version of "I'd Have It Just the Way We Were" is a different recording to the one that appears on their previous album, Fits. Last Day of Summer was re-released on CD format on December 5, 2011. The cover art is an homage to Preston Love's Omaha Bar-B-Q.

== Track listing ==
| No. | Title | Length |
|---|---|---|
| 1. | "I'd Have It Just the Way We Were" | 2:47 |
| 2. | "Home Together" | 3:29 |
| 3. | "Tony Fatti" | 2:42 |
| 4. | "If You're Changing" | 3:59 |
| 5. | "Incaviglia" | 3:15 |
| 6. | "Light Light Light" | 4:20 |
| 7. | "Some Wild Going Outward" | 4:17 |
| 8. | "Champ" | 3:01 |
| 9. | "Shy Billy" | 2:19 |
| 10. | "Our Get" | 3:01 |
| 11. | "Through Your Windows" | 3:00 |
| 12. | "New Coat" | 2:42 |

== Personnel ==
- James Petralli – vocals, guitar
- Joshua Block – drums
- Steve Terebecki – vocals, bass
- Austin Jenkins – guitar
- Danny Reisch – mix engineer, mastering engineer
