= This Land Is Mine =

This Land Is Mine may refer to:

- This Land Is Mine (film), a 1943 war film directed by Jean Renoir and starring Charles Laughton, Maureen O'Hara and George Sanders
- This Land Is Mine (1980 TV series), a Cantonese television series
- "The Exodus Song (This Land Is Mine)", a 1960 song with lyrics by Pat Boone, from music composed by Ernest Gold as the main theme for the Otto Preminger film Exodus
- "This Land Is Mine", a song on the 2003 Life for Rent album by Dido
- "This Land Is Mine", a 2012 animation of 4000 years of historical conflicts in the Levant from Seder-Masochism by Nina Paley.
- This Land Is Mine, a 2021 Singaporean historical drama serial on the aftermath of WWII in Singapore, based on the novel The Devil's Circle by Walter Woon, with particular emphasis on reimaginings of the court trials of Japanese war criminals and the Maria Hertogh riots.
