= Fits (album) =

Studio album by White Denim
- Released: June 22, 2009
- Recorded: 2008
- Genres: Indie rock; psychedelic rock
- Length: 36:52
- Labels: Downtown Records; Full Time Hobby
- Producer: White Denim

White Denim chronology
Exposion (2008)	Fits (2009)	Last Day of Summer (2010)

Professional ratings
Aggregate scores
Source	Rating
Metacritic	81/100
Review scores
Source	Rating
AllMusic	4/5 stars
The Daily Telegraph	4/5 stars
Drowned In Sound	5/10
The Guardian	4/5 stars
The Independent	5/5 stars
NME	8/10
Pitchfork	7.0/10
Planet Sound	5/10
The Skinny	4/5 stars
Uncut	4/5 stars

Fits is White Denim's second LP on European label Full Time Hobby Records, following up the critically acclaimed releases of 2008's EU debut Workout Holiday and US debut Exposion. The band's third full-length album was released in Europe on June 22, 2009, and was released in the United States on October 20, 2009, on Downtown Records.

Prior to the album's release, on April 24, 2009, NME posted the song "Mirrored and Reverse" on their website, giving fans their first taste of Fits. On June 8, 2009, Dallas-based music blog Gorilla vs. Bear released the song "I Start To Run." A week before the album's official release, NME allowed readers to stream the entire album via their website.

== Track listing ==
No.	Title	Length
1.	"Radio Milk How Can You Stand It"	3:53
2.	"All Consolation"	2:55
3.	"Say What You Want"	2:51
4.	"El Hard Attack DCWYW"	1:58
5.	"I Start to Run"	2:52
6.	"Sex Prayer"	2:04
7.	"Mirrored and Reverse"	3:54
8.	"Paint Yourself"	3:25
9.	"I'd Have It Just the Way We Were"	2:19
10.	"Everybody Somebody"	2:53
11.	"Regina Holding Hands"	3:29
12.	"Syncn"	4:19

The album was later repackaged by Downtown Records as a 2 disc set with the U.S.-only album Exposion.

== Videos ==
- "I Start To Run" on YouTube Official video posted by Full Time Hobby Records, directed by Tom Haines.

== Personnel ==
- James Petralli – vocals, guitar
- Joshua Block – drums
- Steve Terebecki – vocals, bass
