= Performance (White Denim album) =

Studio album by White Denim
- Released: August 24, 2018
- Length: 32:38
- Label: City Slang

White Denim chronology
Stiff (2016)	Performance (2018)	Side Effects (2019)

Professional ratings
Aggregate scores
Source	Rating
Metacritic	80/100
Review scores
Source	Rating
AllMusic	3/5 stars
Austin Chronicle	4/5 stars
Clash	7/10
DIY	4/5 stars
Exclaim!	9/10
Pitchfork	6.5/10
PopMatters	8/10

Performance is the eighth studio album by American band White Denim. It was released on August 24, 2018, through City Slang.

== Accolades ==
Publication	Accolade	Rank	Ref.
Double J	Top 50 Albums of 2018	36	
Drift	Top 100 Albums of 2018	6	
Fopp	Top 100 Albums of 2018	30	
Piccadilly Records	Top 100 Albums of 2018	21	
Rough Trade	Top 100 Albums of 2018	75	

== Track listing ==
No.	Title	Length
1.	"Magazin"	3:38
2.	"Performance"	2:25
3.	"Fine Slime"	4:45
4.	"Double Death"	3:27
5.	"Moves On"	3:52
6.	"It Might Get Dark"	3:36
7.	"Sky Beaming"	3:18
8.	"Backseat Driver"	3:16
9.	"Good News"	4:21
Total length:		32:38

== Charts ==
Chart (2018)	Peak position
UK Albums (OCC)	25
