= Tameca Jones =

American singer

Tameca Jones is an American soul and R&B singer residing in Austin, Texas. She grew her fan base though a residency at one of the Continental Club Gallery.

Jones spent years breathing new life into the music of others and made a name for herself as the 'Queen of Austin Soul.' She received accolades from Billboard for her performance at the 2015 Austin Music Awards where she paid tribute to late musician Ian McLagan, alongside Steven Van Zandt, Charlie Sexton, Alejandro Escovedo, and Patty Griffin. Billboard said she "raised the roof," while The Austin Chronicle called her performance "showstopping."

In 2015, Gary Clark Jr. enlisted Jones to sing on a track for his second studio album. She also partnered with Texan musicians for her debut EP of originals that came out in October 2015. The EPs first single, "Hot and Bothered," a Motown inspired cut Jones wrote about a crush. The album is a patchwork of all of her influences from her career tricking out covers.
