= Raze Regal & White Denim Inc. =

Studio album by Raze Regal and White Denim
- Released: November 24, 2023
- Genre: Psychedelic rock; jazz fusion
- Length: 42:18
- Label: Bella Union
- Producer: James Petralli

White Denim chronology
Crystal Bullets / King Tears (2021)	Raze Regal & White Denim Inc. (2023)	12 (2024)

Raze Regal & White Denim Inc. is a collaborative album by Raze Regal of Once and Future Band and the American rock band White Denim, released on November 24, 2023, through Bella Union. It received acclaim from critics.

== Background ==
White Denim vocalist and guitarist James Petralli and Raze Regal have been friends since their bands toured together in 2018. Regal later moved to Petralli's hometown of Austin, Texas in 2020 following his group's disbandment, where they began collaborating on music.

== Critical reception ==
Professional ratings
Aggregate scores
Source	Rating
Metacritic	84/100
Review scores
Source	Rating
AllMusic	4/5 stars
Mojo	4/5 stars
The Observer	4/5 stars
Uncut	8/10

Raze Regal & White Denim Inc. received a score of 84 out of 100 on review aggregator Metacritic based on four critics' reviews, indicating "universal acclaim". Mojo remarked, "from top to bottom, what a joy it is", while Uncut wrote that "Regal's freewheeling eccentricity brings a wild new dimension to White Denim's sound; he should stick around".

AllMusic's Matt Collar called the album "a more jazz- and prog-inflected version of White Denim's garagey psychedelia. It's a vibe the group have been experimenting with since at least 2013's Corsicana Lemonade and which feels like a natural evolution. Regal has a similar style to Petralli's, marked by crisp improvisational riffs and chordal accents that straddle the line between fuzz-tone rock and '70s jazz fusion." Kitty Empire of The Observer found the album to be "funky, warm and full of juice" as "Regal and Petralli fashion taut, soulful pop nuggets out of jazz fusion licks, a sound not a million miles from Tame Impala meeting Thundercat, but gnarlier and different at every turn".

== Track listing ==
All tracks are written by James Petralli and Raze Regal.

Raze Regal & White Denim Inc. track listing
No.	Title	Length
1.	"Ashley Goudeau"	3:51
2.	"Blood"	3:27
3.	"Tivoli"	5:02
4.	"Complaining in Heaven"	3:33
5.	"Don't Laff"	3:41
6.	"The Hustle in You"	3:33
7.	"Before the Fact"	4:19
8.	"Idle Later"	4:46
9.	"Dislocation"	4:27
10.	"Ugly Man Suit"	5:39
Total length:		42:18
