= Stiff (album) =

Studio album by White Denim
- Released: March 25, 2016
- Recorded: 2015–2016
- Studio: Echo Mountain, Asheville, North Carolina
- Genre: Indie rock; garage rock; progressive rock; psychedelic rock; Southern rock; soul
- Length: 35:46
- Label: Downtown
- Producer: Ethan Johns

White Denim chronology
Corsicana Lemonade (2013)	Stiff (2016)	Performance (2018)

Stiff is the seventh studio album by the band White Denim. It is their first release following the departure of drummer Josh Block and guitarist Austin Jenkins, who left in March 2015 to work on Leon Bridges' debut album Coming Home. Jonathan Horne and Jeff Olson have joined the band after touring with James Petralli on his solo project Bop English. Stiff was released on March 25, 2016, by Downtown Records.

== Background ==
"I wanted to treat this like a debut record. The band’s still called White Denim and it is because that’s what we’re calling it, essentially, but I definitely felt like we needed to go back-to-basics. It was like we write the tunes, rehearse them for a week or two weeks – we didn’t do a lot pre-production – then just bang it out. It was the first time to go in with a producer from the beginning of a record and finish with a producer as well."

— James Petralli, frontman

== Release and promotion ==
=== Singles ===
- "Holda You (I'm Psycho)" — The first single was released along with the album announcement. Art Levy of NPR Music said that the song "simultaneously struts and sprints".
- "Ha Ha Ha Ha (Yeah)" — Petralli mentioned Curtis Mayfield as an influence behind the soul sound of the track, mentioning – "It really started with me, sitting in my garage, playing around with Pusherman. R&B, in general, is where it’s at for me."
- "Had 2 Know (Personal)"

== Reception ==
Professional ratings
Aggregate scores
Source	Rating
Metacritic	75/100
Review scores
Source	Rating
AllMusic	4/5 stars
NME	3/5 stars
Clash Magazine	8/10 stars
Drowned in Sound	6/10 stars
The Guardian	4/5 stars
Mojo	4/5 stars
State	4/5 stars
Uncut	8/10 stars

Stiff was released on March 25, 2016, on Downtown Records. Mark Demig, who reviewed the album for AllMusic said "The edgy energy that's long been the band's trademark is present in abundance here, which is welcome news since Stiff debuts a new White Denim lineup." and added that "The tone here is frequently playful, especially when Petralli lets his blue-eyed soul accents come forth. But the attack is taut and the force of this music is no joke." NME give the album three out of five stars, concluding "[The group] wear their virtuosity proudly and with each album their brand of bluesy, Southern-style boogie-woogie becomes less obscured by experimentation, although whether or not that’s a good thing is a moot point. This is certainly the kind of music punk had to be invented for." The Guardian awarded Stiff four out of five stars, praising the soul influence on the songwriting – "Live, they may make your knees shake like Robert Plant, but on record the musicianship often eclipses the songs, resulting in a lack of truly memorable bangers. [Corsicana Lemonade] went some way towards changing that, but on their seventh, the Ethan Johns-produced Stiff, they’ve nailed it by embracing soul – or rather, running into its syrupy-sweet waters."

=== Accolades ===
Publication	Accolade	Year	Rank
Mojo	The 50 Best Albums of 2016	2016	39

== Track listing ==
No.	Title	Length
1.	"Had 2 Know (Personal)"	4:06
2.	"Ha Ha Ha Ha (Yeah)"	3:53
3.	"Holda You (I’m Psycho)"	4:00
4.	"There’s a Brain in My Head"	3:33
5.	"Take It Easy (Ever After Lasting Love)"	3:26
6.	"(I’m the One) Big Big Fun"	4:16
7.	"Real Deal Momma"	3:48
8.	"Mirrored in Reverse"	4:06
9.	"Thank You"	4:38
Total length:		35:46

== Personnel ==
=== White Denim ===
- James Petralli – vocals and guitar
- Steve Terebecki – bass, group vocals, synthesizer
- Jonathon Horne – guitar, group vocals
- Jeff Olson – drums, percussion, synthesizer, group vocals

=== Live ===
- Mike St. Clair – trumpet, synthesizer

=== Additional personnel ===
- Ethan Johns – producer

== Charts ==
Chart (2016)	Peak position
UK Albums (OCC)	20

== Appearances ==
"Ha Ha Ha Ha (Yeah)" was featured in the reveal trailer for the Nintendo Switch.
