= Robert Petway =

American blues singer and guitarist

- The only known photograph of Petway (c. 1941)

Background information
- Born: c. 1903 possibly Itta Bena, Mississippi, U.S.
- Died: unknown; after 1941
- Genres: Blues, Delta blues
- Occupations: Musician, songwriter
- Instruments: Vocals, guitar
- Label: Bluebird Records

Robert Petway (born c. 1903, date of death unknown) was an American blues singer and guitarist. He recorded only 16 songs, but it has been said that he was an influence on many notable blues and rock musicians, including John Lee Hooker, Muddy Waters, and Jimi Hendrix. There is only one known picture of Petway, a publicity photo from 1941. His birth name may have been Pettyway, Pitway, Petaway, or similar.

== Uncertainties over birth and death ==
Little is definitively known about Petway. It has been speculated that he was born at or near the J.F. Sligh Farm, near Yazoo City, Mississippi, the birthplace of his close friend and fellow bluesman Tommy McClennan. Researchers Bob Eagle and Eric LeBlanc suggest that he was born a few miles away in Itta Bena, Leflore County, Mississippi, in about 1902. Census records refer to Robert Pettyway [sic], aged 7 in 1910; and to Robert Petaway [sic], farm worker aged 18 in 1920; both in Leflore County. On February 16, 1942, four days before Robert Petway's second recording session in Chicago, a "Robert Pitway" of Benton, Mississippi registered for the US Draft in Yazoo City, stating his birthplace as Sunflower, Mississippi in 1903. Also registered in Yazoo City on the same day was "Tom McClinnan" of Benton, Mississippi. Both men were employed at the same firm, Williams & Applewhite.

Alternatively, research by Jason Rewald has suggested that Petway may have been born at Gee's Bend, Alabama, in 1907, married in Chicago and died there in 1978. However, Eagle and LeBlanc consider that that person is unlikely to be the Petway who was a musician in Mississippi in 1940.

Assuming that the musician was born around 1902/03 in Mississippi, the date and cause of his death are unknown.

== Career ==
Like many bluesmen from the Mississippi Delta, Petway traveled as a musician, playing at parties, roadhouses, and other venues. Petway and McClennan often travelled and performed together. After McClennan had been in Chicago for a few years, Petway travelled north to join him and cut records, as did Georgia's Frank Edwards, who had met them in Mississippi.

== "Catfish Blues" ==
Petway recorded the song "Catfish Blues" in 1941. Among many other musicians who played variations of the song, Muddy Waters used the arrangement and lyrics of "Catfish Blues" for his song "Rollin' Stone" (the song from which the Rolling Stones took their name). The composition credit given to Petway is based entirely on the recording date of his version of the song, but it cannot establish that his version was the original and the source of later versions. There is speculation that Tommy McClennan wrote the song, as he himself recorded it as "Deep Blues Sea". David "Honeyboy" Edwards (a follower of Petway's), asked if Petway wrote the song, replied, "He just made that song up and used to play it at them old country dances. He just made it up and kept it in his head." In his autobiography, Edwards also remembered the Delta blues guitarist Tom Toy, from Leland, Mississippi, who apparently was well known locally for his version of "Catfish Blues". Toy never recorded.

The second verse of Petway's "Catfish Blues" is as follows:

What if I were a catfish, mama
I said swimmin’ deep down in, deep blue sea
Have these gals now, sweet mama, settin’ out,
Settin’ out hooks for me, settin’ out hook for me
Settin’ out hook for me, settin’ out hook for me
Settin’ out hook for me, settin’ out hook for me

The first verse of Muddy Waters's "Rollin' Stone" has similar lyrics:

Well, I wish I was a catfish,
swimmin in a oh, deep, blue sea
I would have all you good lookin women,
fishin, fishin after me
Sure 'nough, a-after me
Sure 'nough, a-after me
Oh 'nough, oh 'nough, sure 'nough

== Disappearance and death ==
There is no record, official or unofficial, of Petway's death. The last record of his public life is a quote from Honeyboy Edwards: "nobody I know heard what become of him." In his autobiography, Edwards stated that he had heard that Petway may have moved to Chicago, where Edwards himself lived, but that he never met him there.

== Discography ==
Petway only recorded two sessions, both for Bluebird Records in Chicago.

=== Original 78s (in chronological order) ===
First session, recorded on March 28, 1941
Catalogue #	Title
Bluebird B8726	"Rockin' Chair Blues" / "Let Me Be Your Boss"
Bluebird B8756	"Sleepy Woman Blues" / "Don't Go Down Baby"
Bluebird B8786	"My Little Girl" / "Left My Baby Crying"
Bluebird B8838	"Catfish Blues" / "Ride 'Em on Down"
Second session, recorded on February 20, 1942
Catalogue #	Title
Bluebird B8987	"Boogie Woogie Woman" / "Hollow Log Blues"
Bluebird B9008	"Bertha Lee Blues" / "In the Evening"
Bluebird B9036	"My Baby Left Me" / "Cotton Pickin' Blues"
Bluebird unissued	"Hard Working Woman" / "Ar'nt Nobody's Fool"
