= Exposion =

Studio album by White Denim
- Released: October 19, 2008
- Recorded: 2007–2008
- Genre: Indie rock
- Length: 36:38
- Label: Transmission
- Producer: White Denim

White Denim chronology
Workout Holiday LP (2008)	Exposion (2008)	Fits (2009)

Alternative Cover
- Label found on cover of 11 Songs

Professional ratings
Aggregate scores
Source	Rating
Metacritic	73/100
Review scores
Source	Rating
Pitchfork	(7.8/10)
Blender	3.5/5 stars
Rolling Stone	3.5/5 stars
Spin	3.5/5 stars

Exposion is the title of White Denim's first full length U.S. studio album. The debut record was first sold at live shows during their spring 2008 tour with Tapes 'n Tapes. The album was distributed as an unlabeled CD-R in a paper wrapping, along with the title 11 Songs printed on the front, and was later released with full artwork November 3, 2008 on Transmission Entertainment. Exposion features many songs from previous releases, but most have been re-worked and re-recorded. The new album was released much like the Let's Talk About EP (on vinyl and digital format only), with the band reporting that "CDs seem pretty worthless to us". The digital format of the album became available at the band's website on October 19, 2008, as announced at their October 20, 2008 show at Union Hall in Brooklyn, NY. It is also available as a Disc 2 to their 3rd album, Fits on most digital music services.

== Track listing ==
1. "Don't Look That Way At It" - 4:00
2. "Transparency" - 2:25
3. "IEIEI" - 3:08
4. "WDA" - 2:55
5. "Heart From All Of Us" - 3:06
6. "You Can't Say" - 2:37
7. "Shake Shake Shake" - 2:34
8. "All You Really Have To Do" - 2:45
9. "All Truckers Roll" - 2:35
10. "Migration Wind" - 4:33
11. "Sitting" - 5:23

=== Videos ===
- "Shake Shake Shake" - Directed by Tom Haines in July 2008 for Full Time Hobby Records.
- "IEIEI" - Video was shot by White Denim, animation by Jason Archer, edited by Jason Archer and Carlos LaRotta, for Birds on Fire Film.
- "Migration Wind" on YouTube - White Denim performing at the Hot Freaks! ACL after-party on September 14, 2007.

== Personnel ==
- James Petralli: Vocals, guitar
- Joshua Block: Drums
- Steve Terebecki: Vocals, bass
