= Let's Talk About It EP =

EP by White Denim
- Released: May 12, 2007
- Recorded: 2005–2007
- Genre: Indie rock
- Length: 13:40
- Label: Self-released

White Denim chronology
Let's Talk About It EP (2007)	Workout Holiday (2007)

Professional ratings
Review scores
Source	Rating
Pitchfork	(7.3/10)
The Austin Chronicle	3.5/5 stars

Let's Talk About It is the first release by American rock band White Denim. Written and recorded in drummer Joshua Block's vintage 1940s Spartan trailer, the EP was released on May 12, 2007. Nearly 14 minutes long, this five-song 7" record is full of fast-paced, psychedelic-fused blues rock. Since its release, the EP has received critical acclaim, receiving the title of second-best album of 2007 by Gorilla vs. Bear.

== Track listing ==
1. "Let's Talk About It" – 3:54
2. "Darksided Computer Mouth" – 2:15
3. "I Can Tell" – 1:56
4. "Mess Your Hair Up" – 4:49
5. "DCWYW" – 0:46

== Video ==
A music video was directed by Carlos LaRotta, shot and edited by Trey Cartwright, both of Birds-on-Fire Film.

== Personnel ==
- James Petralli: vocals, guitar
- Joshua Block: drums
- Steve Terebecki: vocals, bass guitar
