= Jason Archer =

American artist living in Austin, Texas

- Born: Jason Allen Archer; July 31, 1973 (age 53); Longview, Texas
- Education: The University of Texas at Austin
- Known for: Animation, painting, murals, print making, photography, music videos, short films
- Notable work: Frijolero (2003 music video) The Marfa Mashup (2011) Conservatorium of Infinite Wisdom, Sustenance & Guidance (2014) Stray of the Dead (2014)
- Movement: Contemporary Pop Art

Jason Archer (born July 31, 1973) is an American artist living in Austin, Texas. He is the creator of a variety artworks as a director, animator, painter, and muralist both collaborative and solo. His work includes political satire and Texas inspired characters including Jesus Cornbread & the Alcoholics and Stray of the Dead. Archer’s early career in animation earned him a Grammy and an MTV Video of the Year Award for directing and animating "Frijolero", a music video for the Mexican rock band Molotov. Currently, Archer co-owns Show Goat Mural Works, a company that installs large scale murals such as Daniel Johnston’s ‘Love is the Question. Love is the Answer’ and his very own ‘Conservatorium of Infinite Wisdom, Sustenance and Guidance.’ Archer has participated in numerous art shows, exhibitions and events ranging from SXSW, East Austin Studio Tour and the inaugural Pop Austin International Art Show.

== Life and career ==
=== Early life ===
Early Life Jason was born in Longview, Texas, to parents Charles and Lanell. He is the youngest of two children with an older sister, Melissa.

Jason earned a degree in communications from the University of Texas at Austin, where he studied conceptual thinking within the Creative Sequence, a program within the Advertising school directed specifically for art directors and copywriters. He graduated in 1996, and moved to New York with his design portfolio to begin a career as an Art Director.

=== Career in animation ===
Jason exited his advertising career and began working as an animator on Richard Linklater’s animated feature, Waking Life (2001). Afterward, he began collaborating with Paul Beck, directing and animating music videos for David Byrne, Molotov and Juanes. In 2003, Jason and Paul earned a Latin Grammy for Best Music Video and an MTV Video of the Year Award for directing Molotov’s "Frijolero". Jason and Paul also completed a trilogy of animated political satires including the "Homeland Hodown" featured on "The Most Gigantic Lying Mouth of All Time", a Radiohead DVD. Jason returned to the film industry as Head of Animation on A Scanner Darkly (2006), based on a novel of the same name by Philip K Dick. In 2011, he earned an Emmy nomination for Outstanding Art Direction and Design for animation work featured in the documentary "The Eyes of Me."

=== Career in contemporary art ===
In April 2011, Archer participated in the Texas Biennial, presenting a collection of hand pulled screen prints, photographs, video and animations called Jesus Cornbread and the Alcoholics at Texas State University. Following this presentation, he was offered a teaching position at Texas State University where he taught Digital Animation in the School of Art and Design from Fall 2011— Fall 2014.

In September 2011, Archer’s work was featured on an outdoor mural at 407 S. Colorado Street in Austin, TX. The 30 x 10 foot painting was installed over 48 hours by Archer and a small production team, and captured by time lapse cameras. The Installation of Archer’s piece titled, "Serape Sunset" marked the inauguration of an ongoing outdoor mural project called Frank Public Art which has showcased large scale outdoor installations by noteworthy American artists, including Jeremy Fish and Michael Seiben.[9]

In October 2011, Archer presented a new collection of solo work, in Marfa, TX. The exhibition was held on Highland Avenue in a space formerly occupied by actor Randy Quiad and his wife Evie.[10] "The Marfa Mashup" depicts fictitious encounters between Hollywood’s legendary West Texas characters and their commentary on the contemporary West Texas landscape. The exhibit featured limited edition hand pulled screen prints, signed and numbered on archival deckle-edged cotton paper[11]

Other solo work includes Camp Capitol Hill, a collection of hand pulled screen prints depicting presidential candidates as children enrolled in summer camp, with US forefathers playing roles as youth counselor. Camp Capitol Hill debuted in Oct 2012 during Chinati Weekend in Marfa, Texas [13] and presented later in Austin, Texas during the 2013 EAST Austin Studio Tour.[14]

In February 2012, Archer teamed up with Austin-based designer, Josh "Row" Robertson, to form Show Goat Mural Works, a design and branding firm specializing in outdoor mural installations. To date, Show Goat Mural Works has received commissions for custom art work from brands such as Fender Guitars, Converse, Topo Chico, Cuvee Coffee, Antone’s and Alamo Drafthouse. [15]

In October 2014, Archer was invited to participate in POP Austin International Art Show, an art exhibit and interactive event in Austin, TX. Pop Austin brought together both emerging and renowned contemporary artists from around the world such as Andy Warhol, Takashi Murakami and Arno Elias.[16] Archer contributed animation and installed multiple large scale murals for the POP Austin Event, including his very own "Conservatorium of Infinite Wisdom Sustenance and Guidance".

Archer's influences include Helmut Newton, Bugs Bunny and Texas.[17]
