= Blues rock =

Music genre

- Stylistic origins: Electric blues; blues; rock
- Cultural origins: Early 1960s, United States and United Kingdom
- Typical instruments: Electric guitar; electric bass guitar; drums; keyboards; harmonica
- Derivative forms: Boogie rock; heavy metal; hard rock; Southern rock; acid rock

Blues rock is a fusion genre and form of rock and blues music that relies on the chords/scales and instrumental improvisation of blues. It is mostly an electric ensemble-style music with instrumentation similar to electric blues and rock (electric guitar, electric bass guitar, drums, and sometimes with keyboards and harmonica). From its beginnings in the early 1960s, blues rock has gone through several stylistic shifts and along the way it inspired and influenced hard rock, Southern rock, and early heavy metal.

Blues rock started with rock musicians in the United Kingdom and the United States performing American blues songs. They typically recreated electric Chicago blues songs, like those by Willie Dixon, Muddy Waters, and Jimmy Reed, at faster tempos and with a more aggressive sound common to rock. In the UK, the style was popularized by groups such as the Rolling Stones, the Yardbirds, and the Animals, who put several blues songs into the pop charts. In the US, Lonnie Mack, the Paul Butterfield Blues Band, and Canned Heat were among the earliest exponents. Some of these bands also played long, involved improvisations as were then commonplace on jazz records. In the late 1960s and early 1970s, the style became more hard rock-oriented. In the US, Johnny Winter, the early Allman Brothers Band, and ZZ Top represented a hard rock trend, along with Led Zeppelin, Ten Years After, Chicken Shack, and Foghat in the UK.

Along with hard rock, blues rock songs became the core of the music played on album-oriented rock radio in the United States, and later the classic rock format established there during the 1980s.

== Characteristics ==
The blues gave rock a mother's unconditional love, nurturing it through its difficult stages and always providing a welcome return no matter how far it strayed from home.

— Dave Lifton of Ultimate Classic Rock (December 16, 2016)

Blues rock can be characterized by bluesy improvisation, extended boogie jams typically focused on electric guitar solos, and often a heavier, riff-oriented sound and feel to the songs than found in typical Chicago-style blues. Blues rock bands "borrow[ed] the idea of an instrumental combo and loud amplification from rock & roll". It is also often played at a fast tempo, again distinguishing it from the blues.

Blues rock songs often follow typical blues structures, such as twelve-bar blues, sixteen-bar blues, etc. They also use the I-IV-V progression, though there are exceptions, some pieces having a "B" section, while others remain on the I. The Allman Brothers Band's version of "Stormy Monday", which uses chord substitutions based on Bobby "Blue" Bland's 1961 rendition, adds a solo section where "the rhythm shifts effortlessly into an uptempo 6/8-time jazz feel". The key is usually major, but can also be minor, such as in "Black Magic Woman".

One notable difference is the frequent use of a straight eighth-note or rock rhythm instead of triplets usually found in blues. An example is Cream's "Crossroads". Although it was adapted from Robert Johnson's "Cross Road Blues", the bass "combines with drums to create and continually emphasize continuity in the regular metric drive".

== 1960s–1970s ==
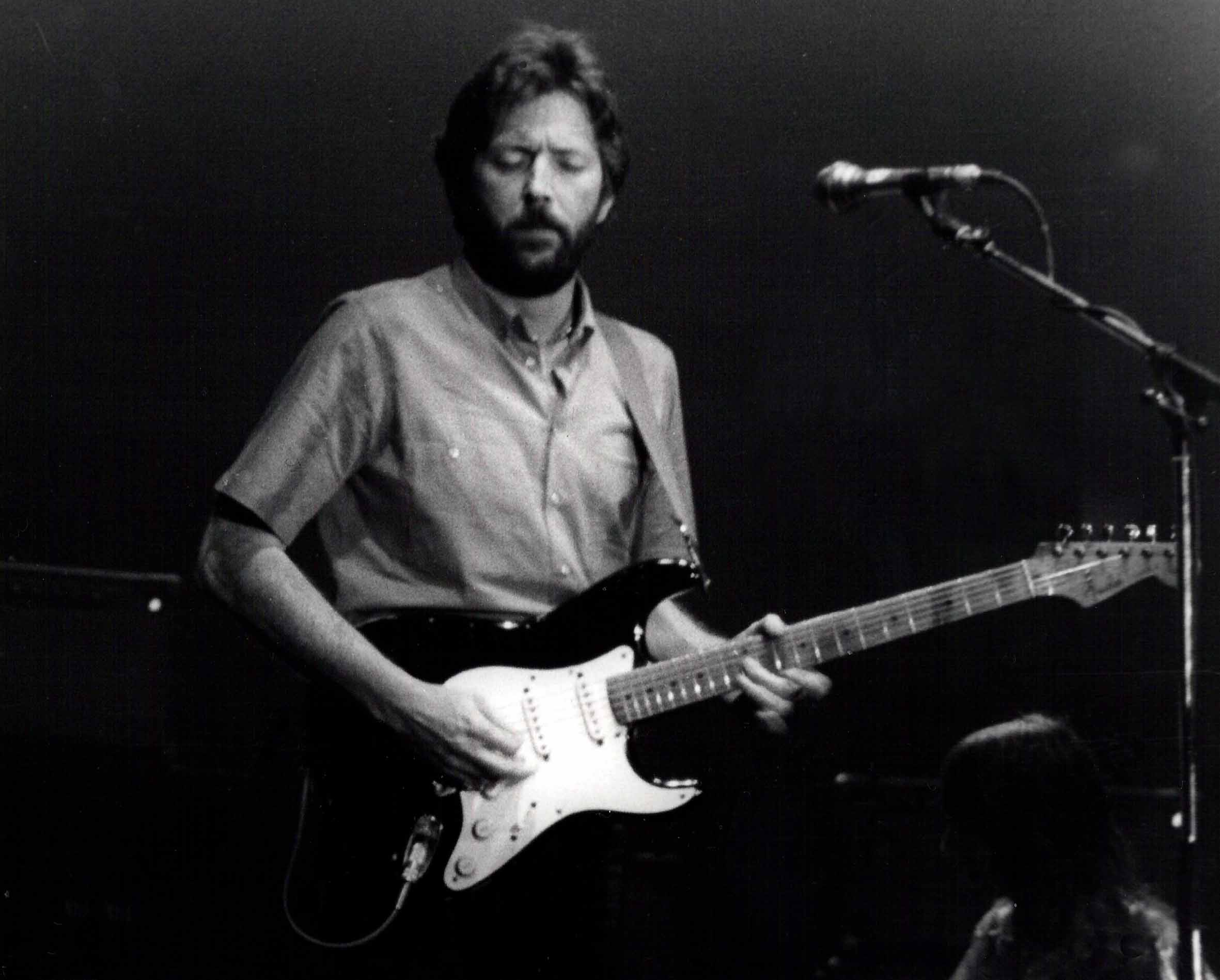
Eric Clapton in 1974

Rock music uses driving rhythms and electric guitar techniques such as distortion and power chords already used by 1950s electric blues guitarists, particularly Memphis bluesmen such as Joe Hill Louis, Willie Johnson and Pat Hare. Characteristics that blues rock adopted from electric blues include its dense texture, basic blues band instrumentation, rough declamatory vocal style, heavy guitar riffs, string-bending blues-scale guitar solos, strong beat, thick riff-laden texture, and posturing performances. Precursors to blues rock included the Chicago blues musicians Elmore James, Albert King, and Freddie King, who began incorporating rock and roll elements into their blues music during the late 1950s to early 1960s.

1963 marked the appearance of American rock guitar soloist Lonnie Mack, whose idiosyncratic, fast-paced electric blues guitar style came to be identified with the advent of blues rock as a distinct genre. His instrumentals from that period were recognizable as blues or rhythm and blues tunes, but he relied heavily upon fast-picking techniques derived from traditional American country and bluegrass genres. The best-known of these are the 1963 Billboard hit singles "Memphis" and "Wham!". Around the same time, the Paul Butterfield Blues Band was formed. Fronted by blues harp player and singer Paul Butterfield, it included two members from Howlin' Wolf's touring band, bassist Jerome Arnold and drummer Sam Lay, and later two electric guitarists, Mike Bloomfield and Elvin Bishop. In 1965, its debut album, The Paul Butterfield Blues Band was released. AllMusic's Michael Erlewine commented, "Used to hearing blues covered by groups like the Rolling Stones, that first album had an enormous impact on young (and primarily White) rock players." The second album East West (1966) introduced extended soloing – the 13 minute instrumental title track included jazz and Indian raga influences – that served as a model for psychedelic and acid rock. In 1965, avid blues collectors Bob Hite and Alan Wilson formed Canned Heat. Their early recordings focused heavily on electric versions of Delta blues songs, but soon began exploring long musical improvisations ("jams") built around John Lee Hooker songs. Other popular mid-1960s groups, such as the Doors and Big Brother and the Holding Company with Janis Joplin, also adapted songs by blues artists to include elements of rock. Butterfield, Canned Heat, and Joplin performed at the Monterey (1967) and Woodstock (1969) festivals.

In the UK, several musicians honed their skills in a handful of British blues bands, primarily those of Cyril Davies and Alexis Korner. While the early British rhythm and blues groups, such as the Rolling Stones, the Yardbirds, and the Animals, incorporated American R&B, rock and roll, and pop, John Mayall took a more distinctly electric blues approach. In 1966, he released Blues Breakers with Eric Clapton, the first of several influential blues rock albums. When Eric Clapton left Mayall to form Cream, they created a hybrid style with blues, rock, and jazz improvisation, which was the most innovative to date. British band Fleetwood Mac initially played traditionally-oriented electric blues, but soon evolved. Their guitarist Peter Green, who was Clapton's replacement with Mayall, brought many innovations to their music. Chicken Shack, early Jethro Tull, Keef Hartley Band and Climax Blues Band recorded blues rock songs.

The electric guitar playing of Jimi Hendrix (a veteran of many American rhythm and blues and soul groups from the early-mid-1960s) and his power trios, the Jimi Hendrix Experience and Band of Gypsys, had a broad and lasting influence on the development of blues rock, especially for guitarists. Clapton continued to explore several musical styles and contributed to bringing blues rock into the mainstream. In the late 1960s, Jeff Beck, with his band the Jeff Beck Group, developed blues rock into a form of heavy rock. Jimmy Page, who replaced Beck in the Yardbirds, followed suit with Led Zeppelin and became a major force in the 1970s heavy metal scene. Other blues rock musicians in the 1970s include Pat Travers, Rory Gallagher, Robin Trower and Roy Buchanan.

Beginning in the early 1970s, American bands such as Aerosmith fused blues with a hard rock edge. Blues rock grew to include Southern rock bands, like the Allman Brothers Band, ZZ Top and Lynyrd Skynyrd, while the British scene, except for the advent of groups such as Status Quo and Foghat, became focused on heavy metal innovation.

== 1980s–present ==
While blues rock and hard rock shared many similarities in the early 1970s, more traditional blues styles influenced blues rock in the 1980s. The Fabulous Thunderbirds, Stevie Ray Vaughan, Georgia Satellites, and Robert Cray recorded their best-known works. Guitarists Gary Moore, Jeff Healey, and Kenny Wayne Shepherd became popular concert attractions in the 1990s. Female blues singers such as Bonnie Raitt, Susan Tedeschi, Joanne Shaw Taylor, Beth Hart, Shannon Curfman, and Sue Foley recorded blues rock albums.

Musicians such as the Jon Spencer Blues Explosion and Ben Harper released alternative blues rock songs. Gary Clark Jr., known for his fusing of blues, rock and soul, has been classified as a blues rock artist, with Rolling Stone's Jonathan Bernstein referring to Clark's albums Blak and Blu (2012) and The Story of Sonny Boy Slim (2015) as "steeped in a sleek, modern blues-rock production style".

Formed in 2017, Bulls of Prey is a successful Hungarian band in this genre. Popular blues rock performer Joe Bonamassa established Keeping the Blues Alive Records in 2020. Larry McCray, Robert Jon & the Wreck, Joanna Connor and others, released music on the label. Dion also experienced several number one albums via KTBA.

== See also ==
- List of blues rock musicians
- Chess Records
- Chicago blues

== Bibliography ==
- Adelt, Ulrich (2011). Blues Music in the Sixties: A Story in Black and White. New Brunswick, New Jersey: Rutgers University Press. ISBN 978-0813551746.
- Brackett, Donald (2007). Fleetwood Mac: 40 Years of Creative Chaos. Westport, Connecticut: Praeger. ISBN 978-0-275-99338-2.
- Campbell, Michael; Brody, James (2007). Rock and Roll: An Introduction. Cengage Learning. ISBN 978-1111794538.
- Christe, Ian (2004). Sound of the Beast. Allison & Busby. ISBN 0-7490-8351-4.
- Dicaire, David (1999). "Elmore James". Blues Singers. McFarland. ISBN 978-0786406067.
- Eder, Bruce (1996). "British Blues". In Erlewine, Michael; Bogdanov, Vladimir; Woodstra, Chris; Koda, Cub (eds.). All Music Guide to the Blues. San Francisco: Miller Freeman Books. ISBN 0-87930-424-3.
- Erlewine, Michael (1996). "Paul Butterfield Blues Band". In Erlewine, Michael; Bogdanov, Vladimir; Woodstra, Chris; Koda, Cub (eds.). All Music Guide to the Blues. San Francisco: Miller Freeman Books. ISBN 0-87930-424-3.
- Guralnick, Peter (1989). Feel Like Going Home: Portraits in Blues and Rock 'n' Roll. Perennial Library. ISBN 978-0060971755.
- Guterman, Jimmy (1992). The Best Rock 'N' Roll Records of All Time. Carol. ISBN 978-0806513256.
- Headlam, Dave (1997). "Blues Transformations in the Music of Cream". In Covach, John; Boone, Graeme M. (eds.). Understanding Rock: Essays in Musical Analysis. Oxford University Press. ISBN 978-0-19510-0051.
- Palmer, Robert (1980). Miller, Jim (ed.). The Rolling Stone Illustrated History of Rock & Roll. New York City: Rolling Stone. ISBN 039-4513223.
- Palmer, Robert (1992). "The Church of the Sonic Guitar". In DeCurtis, Anthony (ed.). Present Tense: Rock & Roll and Culture. Durham, North Carolina: Duke University Press. ISBN 0-8223-1265-4.
- Poe, Randy (2006). Skydog: The Duane Allman Story. San Francisco, California: Backbeat Books. ISBN 0-87930-891-5.
- Prown, Pete; Newquist, Harvey P. (1997). Legends of Rock Guitar: The Essential Reference of Rock's Greatest Guitarists. Hal Leonard. ISBN 0-7935-4042-9.
- Santelli, Robert (1997). The Best of the Blues: The 101 Essential Albums. Penguin Books. ISBN 978-0140237559.
- Unterberger, Richie (1996). "Blues Rock". In Erlewine, Michael; Bogdanov, Vladimir; Woodstra, Chris; Koda, Cub (eds.). All Music Guide to the Blues. San Francisco: Miller Freeman Books. ISBN 0-87930-424-3.
- Weinstein, Deena (2000). Heavy Metal: The Music and Its Culture. Da Capo Press. ISBN 0-306-80970-2.
