= Corsicana Lemonade =

Studio album by White Denim
- Released: October 29, 2013
- Genre: Indie rock; garage rock; progressive rock; psychedelic rock; Southern rock
- Length: 37:50
- Label: Downtown
- Producer: Jeff Tweedy, Jim Vollentine, White Denim

White Denim chronology
D (2011)	Corsicana Lemonade (2013)	Stiff (2016)

Singles from Corsicana Lemonade
- 1. "Pretty Green" Released: 21 September 2013

Corsicana Lemonade is the sixth full-length studio album by Austin, Texas-based band White Denim. The album was released on October 29, 2013, by Downtown Records.

== History ==
"Pretty Green" was the first song released as a single from the album. It was released on September 21, 2013, alongside the announcement of the album. Though the single has not charted on any chart to date, Billboard has reported in 2013 that the single was close to charting on the Billboard Alternative Songs chart and also the Triple A airplay charts as well.

== Commercial performance ==
The album debuted at number four on the Billboard Heatseekers Albums chart. The album sold more than 3,000 copies in its first week. The album also charted at #147 on Billboard 200 and remains the only album released by the band to chart.

== Critical reception ==
Professional ratings
Aggregate scores
Source	Rating
Metacritic	80/100
Review scores
Source	Rating
AllMusic	4/5 stars
Consequence of Sound	4/5 stars
The Independent	4/5 stars
London Evening Standard	4/5 stars
NME	8/10
Rolling Stone	3.5/5 stars
This is Fake DIY	4/5 stars
Uncut	9/10

The album was well received by music critics upon its initial release. At Metacritic, which assigns a normalized rating out of 100 to reviews from mainstream publications, the album received an average score of 80, based on 20 reviews, indicating "generally positive reviews."

== Track listing ==
No.	Title	Length
1.	"At Night in Dreams"	4:04
2.	"Corsicana Lemonade"	3:20
3.	"Limited by Stature"	2:29
4.	"New Blue Feeling"	3:18
5.	"Come Back"	3:19
6.	"Distant Relative Salute"	3:17
7.	"Let It Feel Good (My Eagles)"	3:44
8.	"Pretty Green"	4:09
9.	"Cheer Up / Blues Ending"	5:33
10.	"A Place to Start"	4:37
Total length:		37:50

== Charts ==
Chart (2013)	Peak position
US Heatseekers	4
US Billboard 200	147
