= White Denim =

American rock band

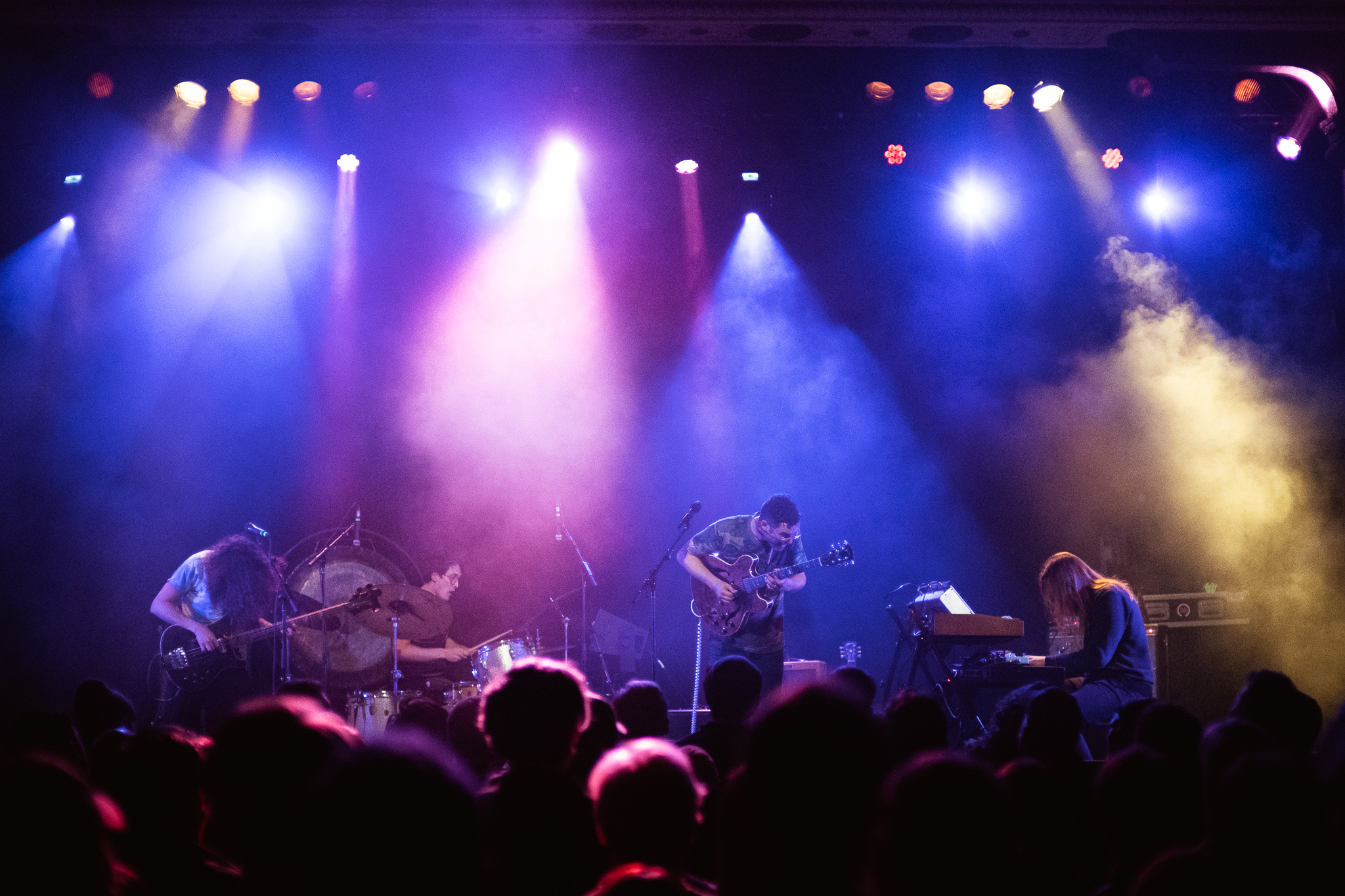
- White Denim performing in Chicago, 2019

Background information
- Origin: Austin, Texas, United States
- Genres: Indie rock; garage rock; progressive rock; psychedelic rock; Southern rock; experimental rock
- Years active: 2006–present
- Labels: Downtown (US); MapleMusic (Canada); Full Time Hobby (EU); RCRD LBL; City Slang; Bella Union
- Members: James Petralli; Steve Terebecki; Matt Young; Cat Clemons; Michael Hunter
- Past members: Conrad Choucroun; Austin Jenkins; Joshua Block; Jonathon Horne; Jeff Olson; Gregory Clifford
- Website: Official website

White Denim is an American rock band from Austin, Texas, United States. Their music is influenced by dub, psychedelic rock, blues, punk rock, progressive rock, soul, jazz, experimental rock with home-based recording, jamming approach, intense looping work and unusual song structures.

== History ==
=== Origin and lineup ===
In March 2005, two bands, Parque Touch (Josh Block, James Petralli, Lucas Anderson) and Peach Train (Steve Terebecki), played a show together at Beerland in Austin, Texas. After the show Steve was asked to play bass for Parque Touch and the band became four, playing under the pseudonyms Byshop Massive (Lucas), Bop English (James), Nicholas Mallard (Josh), and Terry Beckins (Steve); however, in February 2006, Lucas moved to Russia and the resulting power trio changed its name to White Denim. The new line-up began playing the local Austin circuit while recording punk-infused, psychedelic blues-rock in Block's 1940s Spartan trailer.

=== 2007–2016: Workout Holiday, Explosion, Fits, D, Corsicana Lemonade, and international success ===
In 2007, the band self-released its first EP titled Let's Talk About It on 7" only, but later these tracks became available on iTunes. While on tour in 2007, the band recorded a nine-song "tour EP" titled Workout Holiday, which was only sold at shows. Workout Holiday caught the ear of new netlabel RCRD LBL, and the band signed on to re-record three of the songs. These songs were exclusively released as the RCRD LBL EP, one MP3 track at a time over the course of the first few months of 2008.

Since these releases, the band has toured extensively, playing shows including SXSW and CMJ Music Marathon, and also received the award of "Best New Band" at the 2008 Austin Music Awards. In order to reach European listeners, the band signed to UK record label Full Time Hobby (home to The Hold Steady and Viva Voce) for an overseas release. The first release on Full Time Hobby was the single "Let's Talk About It" b/w "Darksided Computer Mouth". On June 23, 2008, the band released its debut album, the Workout Holiday LP, which consists of re-recorded songs from the band's first two self-released EPs along with some new tracks. The band later released two more singles in Europe from Workout Holiday: "All You Really Have To Do" b/w "DCWYW" and "Shake Shake Shake" b/w "All Truckers Roll".

Back in the U.S., White Denim released their debut U.S. full-length LP, titled Exposion in late 2008. Originally sold during their Spring 2008 tour as a CD-R with the title 11 Songs, the album was made available in digital format from their official website on October 19, 2008. The band teamed up with Austin's Transmission Entertainment for the distribution of Exposion in the US; however, the two parted ways in mid-2009.

White Denim's third full-length album, Fits, was released via Full Time Hobby on June 22, 2009. The record was initially released in Europe only, but after signing their first US record deal with Downtown Records on July 10, the band release Fits on October 20, 2009. This album was also packaged with Exposion as a bonus disc, giving the band's second LP a proper US release.

In September 2010 White Denim announced the addition of second guitarist Austin Jenkins to the band's line-up. On September 23, 2010, the band self-released a collection of 12 tracks under the title Last Day of Summer. The release notes state: "This record is something we made as a little summer retreat from our ongoing work on the third full length. Many of these tunes have been bouncing around since the formation of the band back in 06. We were super pumped to utilize a few fresh and casual musical approaches on this record." It was initially available to download for free (with an option to make a donation) from the band's official website, but on December 5, 2011, it was released by Downtown Records on CD and LP.

On May 24, 2011, White Denim released their fourth studio album D on Downtown Records. The first leg of White Denim's For D tour started on May 23 in Sail Inn, Tempe.

In 2012, White Denim opened for Wilco on their Jan-Feb west coast tour and played at the 2012 Bonnaroo Music & Arts Festival and Outside Lands festival.

In 2015, James Petralli released his first solo album, Constant Bop, under his pseudonym, Bop English. Guitarist Austin Jenkins and drummer Josh Block left the band that summer to work on other projects - guitarist Jonathan Horne and drummer Jeffrey Olson filled their spots.

=== 2016–2023: Radio Milk, Stiff, Performance, and collaborations ===
On January 7, 2016, White Denim announced that their seventh album, Stiff, would be released on 25 March 2016 via Downtown/Sony Red, with the track "Holda You (I'm Psycho)" shared on their SoundCloud. A second track, "Ha Ha Ha Ha (Yeah)", was released on 1 February 2016. On October 20, 2016, the song was used in the reveal trailer for the Nintendo Switch.

In 2018, Petralli and Terebecki founded Radio Milk, a recording studio and performance venue in East Austin, Texas, working with engineer Jim Vollentine of Austin thrash band Skrew. The duo would go on to produce several White Denim recordings at the studio (including Performance in 2018 and Side Effects and In Person in 2019) as well as the self-titled record by Fort Worth artist Andy Pickett.

On May 9, 2018, the band announced their eighth full-length album, Performance, scheduled for release on August 28 via City Slang Records. The announcement was accompanied by the album's lead single, "Magazin", and followed by a second single, "It Might Get Dark", on June 12.

On March 29, 2019, the band released the follow-up to Performance, called Side Effects. Then, on October 29 of the same year, they released a live album, In Person.

On March 14, 2020, the group announced their intention to write and record an album in 30 days with remote contributions from collaborative artists during the COVID-19 pandemic. The record, eventually titled World As A Waiting Room, was complete by April 17 and released on May 8 by White Denim's own Radio Milk Records.

On July 30, 2021, the group released the record Crystal Bullets / King Tears via English Mallard, preceded by the single Crystal Bullets. The record would later be re-released as Relaxed under the Radio Milk banner on May 10, 2023.

=== 2023–present: Raze Regal & White Denim Inc., 12, and return to touring ===
In 2023, Petralli, then relocated from Texas to California, collaborated with Oakland-based guitarist Raze Regal on the album Raze Regal & White Denim Inc.. The record was released via Bella Union in November 2023.

On September 4, 2024, White Denim announced a new album titled 12, which was released on December 6, 2024. The group supported the record with a series of tour dates throughout the UK and Ireland through early 2025.

During a December 2024 Reddit AMA promoting the release of 12, a user posed a question regarding the current manifestation of White Denim and its status as an active group. Petralli responded:

I wear a ton of hats now-My partner and I manage the group.
I am shouldering the bulk of the day to day studio work.

— James Petralli, Reddit Ask Me Anything thread, December 18, 2024.

"Things have gotten a lot leaner in the industry at large for bands and we are definitely much leaner as well. ... For a while there we had considerable recording/marketing budgets to work with-this was awesome for learning but the expectation to recoup these budgets through constant touring created discomfort for us personally. ... During the pandemic I sort of just let go of of [sic] chasing this thing that was years in the past by then. In doing so I became more relaxed and happier. ... [T]he guys in the stage band actually contribute more material now than any have in the past."

== Members ==
- James Petralli – vocals, guitar
- Steve Terebecki – bass guitar
- Michael Hunter – keyboards
- Cat Clemons – guitar
- Matt Young – drums

== Discography ==
- Workout Holiday (2008)
- Exposion (2008)
- Fits (2009)
- Last Day of Summer (2010)
- D (2011)
- Corsicana Lemonade (2013)
- Stiff (2016)
- Performance (2018)
- Side Effects (2019)
- World as a Waiting Room (2020)
- Crystal Bullets / King Tears (2021) – re-released in 2023 as Relaxed
- Raze Regal & White Denim Inc. with Raze Regal (2023)
- 12 (2024)
- 13 (2026)
- Hypnotist (2026)
