= 2024 in American music =

The following is a list of events and releases that have happened in 2024 in music in the United States.

== Notable events ==
=== January ===
- 8 – Fantasia performed the national anthem at the College Football Playoff National Championship at NRG Stadium in Houston, Texas.
- 12 – 21 Savage released his first solo studio album in nearly six years, American Dream.
  - Exit Eden released their first studio album in seven years, Femmes Fatales.
- 16 – After teasing a reunion show, it was announced that No Doubt would be performing at Coachella in April 2024.
- 19 – Green Day released their first studio album in nearly four years, Saviors.
- 26 – Static-X released their first studio album in four years, Project: Regeneration Vol. 2. It features the final recordings of the band's original frontman, Wayne Static, who died nearly 10 years prior.
  - Alkaline Trio released their first studio album in nearly six years, Blood, Hair, and Eyeballs. It is also their final album with longtime drummer Derek Grant, who left the band in 2023 after the recording of the album.
  - Future Islands released their first album in four years, People Who Aren't There Anymore.
- 30 – Chita Rivera died at the age of 91.

=== February ===
- 2 – Gabby Barrett released her first studio album in nearly four years, Chapter & Verse.
  - Vera Sola released her first studio album in four years, Peacemaker.
- 4 – The 66th Annual Grammy Awards took place at the Crypto.com Arena in Los Angeles, California. Trevor Noah hosts. Taylor Swift won Album of the Year with Midnights, making her the artist with the most wins in that category with four. Miley Cyrus won Record of the Year for "Flowers" and Billie Eilish won Song of the Year for "What Was I Made For?", while Victoria Monét was awarded Best New Artist.
- 5 – Country music singer Toby Keith died from stomach cancer at the age of 62.
- 9 – Chelsea Wolfe released her first solo studio album in five years, She Reaches Out to She Reaches Out to She.
  - Brittany Howard released her first solo studio album in five years, What Now.
  - Usher released his first solo studio album in nearly eight years and his first overall in six years, Coming Home.
- 10 – Kanye West and Ty Dolla Sign independently released their first collaborative studio album, Vultures 1.
- 11 – Reba McEntire performed the national anthem and Usher performed the halftime show during Super Bowl LVIII at Allegiant Stadium in Paradise, Nevada.
  - Beyoncé released two country singles, "16 Carriages" and "Texas Hold 'Em", leading to controversy over Black musicians' place in country music.
- 16 – The Obsessed released their first studio album in seven years, Gilded Sorrow.
  - Jennifer Lopez released her first studio album in nearly ten years, This Is Me... Now.
  - Laura Jane Grace released her first solo studio album in four years, Hole in My Head.
  - Jason Derulo released his first studio album in nearly nine years, Nu King.
- 23 – MGMT released their first studio album in six years, Loss of Life.
  - I Dont Know How but They Found Me released its sophomore album, and also first in nearly four years, Gloom Division. It is also its first album as a solo project for frontman Dallon Weekes, following the departure of drummer Ryan Seaman in 2023.
  - Job for a Cowboy released their first studio album in nearly ten years, Moon Healer.
  - Darkest Hour released their first studio album in seven years, Perpetual | Terminal.
  - Real Estate released their first studio album in four years, Daniel.
  - Philip Sayce released his first album in four years, The Wolves Are Coming.

=== March ===
- 1 – Schoolboy Q released his first studio album in five years, Blue Lips.
  - Mannequin Pussy released their first studio album in five years, I Got Heaven.
  - New Years Day released their first studio album in five years, Half Black Heart.
  - Sheer Mag released their first studio album in five years, Playing Favorites.
- 8 – Ariana Grande released her first studio album in nearly four years, Eternal Sunshine.
  - Sawyer Brown released their first album in 13 years, Desperado Troubadours.
  - Exhorder released their first studio album in five years, Defectum Omnium.
- 11 – Former Raspberries singer Eric Carmen died at the age of 74.
- 15 – Justin Timberlake released his first studio album in six years, Everything I Thought It Was.
  - The Dandy Warhols released their first studio album in four years, Rockmaker.
  - Tierra Whack released her first studio album in nearly six years, World Wide Whack.
  - Scott Stapp released his first solo studio album in five years, Higher Power.
  - The Black Crowes released their first studio album in 15 years, Happiness Bastards.
  - Atrophy released their first studio album in 34 years, Asylum.
- 22 – Gossip released their first studio album in nearly 12 years, Real Power.
  - Gary Clark Jr. released his first studio album in five years, JPEG Raw.
  - Julia Holter released her first studio album in six years, Something in the Room She Moves.
  - Adrianne Lenker released her first solo studio album in four years, Bright Future.
  - Jlin released her first studio album in six years, Akoma.
  - Kenny Chesney released his first studio album in four years, Born.
  - The Drake–Kendrick Lamar feud began.
- 29 – Sheryl Crow released her first studio album in five years, Evolution.
  - Beyoncé released Cowboy Carter, the second part of her three-act project. It is also her first country music album.
  - Chastity Belt released their first studio album in five years, Live Laugh Love.
  - Tommy Walter's solo project, Abandoned Pools, released its first studio album in nearly 11 years, The Haunted House.

=== April ===
- 1 – The 2024 iHeartRadio Music Awards was held at the Dolby Theatre in Los Angeles. Ludacris hosts.
- 5 – Vampire Weekend released their first studio album in nearly five years, Only God Was Above Us.
  - Strung Out released their first studio album in five years, Dead Rebellion.
  - Bayside released their first studio album in nearly five years, There Are Worse Things Than Being Alive.
  - Tori Kelly released her first studio album in nearly four years, Tori.
  - Katie Pruitt released her first studio album in four years, Mantras.
  - FireHouse frontman C. J. Snare died at the age of 64.
- 7 – The 2024 CMT Music Awards took place at the Moody Center in Austin, Texas. Kelsea Ballerini hosts.
- 12 – Blue Öyster Cult released their first studio album in four years, and their final album, Ghost Stories.
  - Riot V released their first album in six years, Mean Streets.
- 18 – The Allman Brothers co-founder Dickey Betts died from cancer and COPD at his home in Osprey, Florida. He was 80.
  - Gospel singer and former American Idol contestant Mandisa died in her home in Nashville at the age of 47.
- 19 – Pearl Jam released their first studio album in four years, Dark Matter.
  - A posthumous Glen Campbell album, Duets – Ghost on the Canvas Sessions, was released, marking his second album since his death in 2017 as well as his first in six years.
  - The Ghost Inside released their first studio album in four years, Searching for Solace.
  - High on Fire released their first studio album in six years, Cometh the Storm.
- 26 – Alien Ant Farm released their first album in nine years, Mantras.
  - Deicide released their first studio album in six years, Banished by Sin.
  - Iron & Wine released his first solo studio album in seven years, and his first overall in five years, Light Verse.

=== May ===
- 3 – Kamasi Washington released his first solo studio album in six years, Fearless Movement.
  - P.O.D. released their first studio album in six years, Veritas.
- 7 – Longtime music producer and engineer Steve Albini died from a heart attack at the age of 61.
- 10 – Knocked Loose released their first studio album in five years, You Won't Go Before You're Supposed To.
  - Incubus released Morning View XXIII, a re-recorded version of their 2001 album, Morning View.
  - Sublime with Rome released their self-titled album, their first in five years and also their final album. It preceded the band's disbandment later in the year following the reunion of their original iteration in late 2023.
  - Les Savy Fav released their first studio album in 14 years, Oui, LSF.
  - Like Moths to Flames released their first studio album in four years, The Cycles of Trying to Cope.
  - Six Feet Under released their first studio album in four years, Killing for Revenge.
  - Chick Corea and Béla Fleck released their final collaborative album and first in nine years, Remembrance.
- 12 – Jazz saxophonist David Sanborn died from prostate cancer at the age of 78.
- 13 – Childish Gambino released his first studio album in four years, Atavista. It is the finished version of his previous album, 2020's 3.15.20.
- 16 – The 59th Academy of Country Music Awards took place in Ford Center at The Star in Frisco, Texas with host Reba McEntire.
- 17 – The Avett Brothers released their first studio album in five years, The Avett Brothers.
  - Former Slayer guitarist Kerry King released his debut solo studio album, From Hell I Rise. This is the first album with King credited as a primary artist since Slayer's final studio album nine years prior.
  - New Kids on the Block released their first album in 11 years, Still Kids.
  - Rapsody released her first studio album in five years, Please Don't Cry.
  - Cage the Elephant released their first studio album in five years, Neon Pill.
  - Pallbearer released their first studio album in four years, Mind Burns Alive.
  - Gatecreeper released their first studio album in five years, Dark Superstition.
  - Shellac released their first studio album in ten years, To All Trains. The album features posthumous credits from guitarist/vocalist and record engineer Steve Albini, who died ten days before its release.
- 19 – Abi Carter won the 22nd season of American Idol. Will Moseley was named runner-up.
- 21 – Asher HaVon won the 25th season of The Voice. Josh Sanders was named runner-up
- 24 – Lenny Kravitz released his first album in six years, Blue Electric Light.
  - Say Anything released their first studio album in five years, ...Is Committed.
  - DIIV released their first studio album in five years, Frog in Boiling Water.
- 31 – Buffalo Tom released their first studio album in seven years, Jump Rope.
  - +/- released their first studio album in ten years, Further Afield.
  - The Hope Conspiracy released their first studio album in 18 years, Tools of Oppression / Rule by Deception.

=== June ===
- 7 – Bon Jovi released their first studio album in four years, Forever.
  - NxWorries, consisting of Anderson .Paak and Knxwledge, released their first studio album in eight years, Why Lawd?.
- 14 – The Decemberists released their first studio album in six years, As It Ever Was, So It Will Be Again.
  - Black Country Communion released their first studio album in seven years, V.
  - Normani released her debut solo studio album, Dopamine. It is her first album released since Fifth Harmony announced their hiatus in 2018, and first overall in six years.
  - Fu Manchu released their first studio album in six years, The Return of Tomorrow.
- 19 – Kendrick Lamar held his one-off concert, The Pop Out: Ken & Friends.
- 21 – The Story So Far released their first studio album in nearly six years, I Want to Disappear. It is also their first album as a quartet following the departure of bassist Kelen Capener in 2022.
- 24 – Crazy Town vocalist Shifty Shellshock was found dead from an accidental drug overdose at the age of 49.

=== July ===
- 12 – Eminem released his first studio album in four years, The Death of Slim Shady (Coup de Grâce).
  - Cigarettes After Sex released their first studio album in five years, X's.
  - Mr. Big released their first studio album in seven years, Ten.
  - Phish released their first studio album in four years, Evolve.
- 19 – Beachwood Sparks released their first studio album in 12 years, Across the River of Stars.
- 26 – Cherry Poppin' Daddies released their first studio album in five years, At the Pink Rat.
  - Rakim released his first studio album in 15 years, God's Network: Reb7rth.
  - After 15 years together, Off! performed their final show at Belasco Theatre in Los Angeles.
  - State Faults released their first studio album in five years, Children of the Moon.

=== August ===
- 2 – Aerosmith canceled Peace Out: The Farewell Tour after only three shows and announced their retirement from touring due to permanent damage to frontman Steven Tyler's vocal cords.
  - X released their final studio album and their first in four years, Smoke & Fiction.
  - Khalid released his first studio album in five years, Sincere.
  - Anberlin released their first studio album in ten years, Vega; two songs from the album feature lead vocals by Memphis May Fire frontman Matty Mullins, who took over for original vocalist Stephen Christian after Christian announced a touring hiatus from the band in 2023.
- 9 – Four Year Strong released their first studio album in four years, Analysis Paralysis.
  - Mushroomhead released their first studio album in four years, Call the Devil.
- 16 – Foster the People released their first studio album in seven years, Paradise State of Mind. It is also their first album with frontman Mark Foster as the only original remaining band member following the departure of drummer Mark Pontius in 2021.
  - Ray LaMontagne released his first album in four years, Long Way Home.
  - Charly Bliss released their first studio album in five years, Forever.
  - Falling in Reverse released their first studio album in seven years, Popular Monster.
- 21 – After taking a hiatus from the band in 2023, Imagine Dragons drummer Daniel Platzman officially announced his departure from the band.
- 23 – Nile released their first studio album in five years, The Underworld Awaits Us All.
  - Sabrina Carpenter released her first studio album in two years, "Short n' Sweet".
- 30 – Big Sean released his first studio album in four years, Better Me Than You.
  - Laurie Anderson released her first studio album in 14 years, Amelia.
  - Nails released their first studio album in eight years, Every Bridge Burning.
  - Awolnation released their first studio album in four years, The Phantom Five.

=== September ===
- 6 – Mercury Rev released their first studio album in five years and their first of all-original material in nine years, Born Horses.
  - LL Cool J released his first studio album in eleven years, The FORCE.
  - Paris Hilton released her first studio album in 18 years, Infinite Icon.
  - George Strait released his first studio album in five years, Cowboys and Dreamers.
  - The Airborne Toxic Event released their first studio album in four years, Glory.
- 11 – MTV Video Music Awards took place in UBS Arena in Elmont, New York. Megan Thee Stallion hosted.
- 13 – A Jane's Addiction show in Boston was cut short after frontman Perry Farrell got into a heated altercation on stage with guitarist Dave Navarro. The band canceled the remainder of their tour with Love and Rockets as a result, citing the state of Farrell's mental health. The tour had marked the first time that the band's original lineup performed live together since 2010. In January 2025, the band stated that they would continue without Farrell, but then in May, Navarro announced that the band would officially not continue.
  - Jordin Sparks released her first studio album of all-original material in nine years, No Restrictions.
  - Nada Surf released their first studio album in four years, Moon Mirror.
  - The Jesus Lizard released their first studio album in 26 years, Rack.
- 15 – Singer and former Jackson 5 member Tito Jackson died from a heart attack at the age of 70.
- 16 – REO Speedwagon announced that they will retire from touring in 2025 due to irreconcilable differences.
- 20 – Bright Eyes released their first studio album in four years, Five Dice, All Threes.
  - Fidlar released their first studio album in five years, Surviving the Dream.
  - Neon Trees released their first studio album in four years, Sink Your Teeth.
  - Katy Perry released her first studio album in four years, 143.
  - The Voidz released their first studio album in six years, Like All Before You.
- 27 – The Black Dahlia Murder released their first studio album in four years, Servitude. It is the band's first studio album with former rhythm guitarist Brian Eschbach on vocals following the death of previous vocalist Trevor Strnad in 2022.
  - Luke Bryan released his first studio album in four years, Mind of a Country Boy.
  - Soul Asylum released their first studio album in four years, Slowly But Shirley.
- 28 – Kris Kristofferson died at his home in Maui at age 88.
- 29 – Foo Fighters announced that they would be taking an indefinite hiatus following frontman Dave Grohl's admission to adultery he had committed outside of his marriage.

=== October ===
- 3 – Rascal Flatts announced that they would be reuniting for a 25th Anniversary tour set to begin in February 2025.
- 4 – Balance and Composure released their first studio album in eight years, With You in Spirit.
  - Fever 333 released their first studio album in five years, Darker White.
- 6 – After 41 years together, NOFX performed their final show at Berth 46 in San Pedro, Los Angeles.
- 7 – Cissy Houston, gospel singer and mother of Whitney Houston, died at the age of 91.
- 11 – Touché Amoré released their first studio album in four years, Spiral in a Straight Line.
- 18 – MC5 released their final studio album and first in 53 years, Heavy Lifting. The album's release followed the band's split following the deaths of Wayne Kramer in February and Dennis Thompson in May.
  - Bear Hands released their first studio album in five years, The Key to What.
  - Jennifer Hudson released her first studio album in ten years, and her first-ever Christmas album, The Gift of Love.
  - Phantogram released their first album in four years, Memory of a Day.
- 19 – The 2024 Rock and Roll Hall of Fame induction ceremony took place in Cleveland with a class featuring Dave Matthews Band, Cher, Mary J. Blige, A Tribe Called Quest, and Jimmy Buffett.
- 25 – 311 released their first album in five years, Full Bloom.
  - The Used frontman Bert McCracken released his debut solo album under the artist name robbietheused.
- 29 – Longtime Primus drummer Tim Alexander abruptly announced his retirement from the band through an email to his bandmates.

=== November ===
- 3 – Music producer Quincy Jones died at the age of 91.
- 15 – Linkin Park released their first studio album in seven years, From Zero. It is the band's first album with new co-lead singer Emily Armstrong (from the band Dead Sara) and drummer Colin Brittain, following the death of original lead singer Chester Bennington in 2017 and the departure of co-founder and original drummer Rob Bourdon, who did not rejoin the band upon its reformation earlier this year.
  - As I Lay Dying released their first studio album in five years, Through Storms Ahead.
  - Gwen Stefani released her first solo studio album in seven years, Bouquet.
- 20 – 58th Annual Country Music Association Awards took place in Bridgestone Arena in Nashville, Tennessee. Luke Bryan, Peyton Manning, and Lainey Wilson hosted.
- 22 – The Breeders frontwoman and former Pixies bassist Kim Deal released her debut solo studio album, Nobody Loves You More. It is her first release since the Breeders' previous studio album six years prior.
  - Ice Cube released his first studio album in six years, Man Down.
  - Marilyn Manson released their first album in four years, One Assassination Under God – Chapter 1.
  - Body Count released their first studio album in four years, Merciless.
- 26 – Former My Chemical Romance drummer Bob Bryar was found dead at his home in Nashville, Tennessee at the age of 44, his death having occurred two days earlier.

=== December ===
- 10 – Sofronio Vasquez was crowned the winner of twenty-sixth season on The Voice. Shye declared Runner-Up. Sydney Sterlace, Danny Joseph, and Jeremy Beloate finished in third, fourth, and fifth place respectively.
- 12 – The Billboard Music Awards took place.
- 24 – Redman released his first studio album in nine years, Muddy Waters Too, a sequel to his 1996 album, Muddy Waters.

== Bands formed ==
- DivaGurl
- House of Protection
- Inside The Trojan Horse
- Julien Baker & Torres
- Katseye
- Seven Hours After Violet
- Sons of Sunday

== Bands reformed ==
- Brand New
- The Brobecks
- Linkin Park
- Louis XIV
- No Doubt
- Orange 9mm
- The Pains of Being Pure at Heart
- Rascal Flatts
- Slayer
- Soul Coughing
- This Day Forward
- Tripping Daisy

== Bands on hiatus ==
- Foo Fighters
- Jane's Addiction
- Lukas Nelson & Promise of the Real
- McCafferty
- Tenacious D

== Bands disbanded ==
- Boys World
- Hall & Oates
- MC5
- NOFX
- Off!
- Otep
- Rage Against the Machine
- Sublime with Rome
- Thelonious Monster

== List of albums released ==
=== January ===
Date	Album	Artist	Genre
5	The Chosen Ones	NLE Choppa & DJ Booker	Hip hop
5	Hot Air Balloon	Pile	Indie rock; post-punk
12	American Dream	21 Savage	Hip hop
12	Femmes Fatales	Exit Eden	Symphonic metal; hard rock
12	Obsidian Wreath	Infant Island	Black metal; post-rock; post-hardcore
12	Insano	Kid Cudi	Hip hop; alternative hip hop
12	Omni, Pt. 2	Project 86	Metalcore; nu metal
12	Rattle the Cage	The Rods	Hard rock; heavy metal
12	Orquídeas	Kali Uchis	R&B; reggaeton; synth-pop
19	Plastic Death	Glass Beach	Art rock; indie rock
19	Saviors	Green Day	Punk rock; power pop
19	Alive in New York City	Daniel Johnston	Lo-fi; avant-pop
19	Little Rope	Sleater-Kinney	Alternative rock; indie rock
19	My Stupid Life	Brittney Spencer	Country
26	Blood, Hair, and Eyeballs	Alkaline Trio	Pop-punk; punk rock
26	Fission	Dead Poet Society	Alternative rock; rock
26	Love Ain't Pretty	Charles Esten	Country
26	People Who Aren't There Anymore	Future Islands	Synth-pop; indie pop
26	Polaroid Lovers	Sarah Jarosz	Country; bluegrass
26	Project: Regeneration Vol. 2	Static-X	Hard rock; heavy metal
26	The Dream Dreaming	Craig Wedren	Alternative rock; indie rock

=== February ===
Date	Album	Artist	Genre(s)
2	Chapter & Verse	Gabby Barrett	Country
2	BEACON	Morgxn	Indie pop; alternative R&B
2	The Interrogator	The Paranoid Style	Garage rock; indie rock
2	Peacemaker	Vera Sola	Folk; indie folk
2	Compassion	Vijay Iyer Trio	Jazz; classical
8	American Romance (EP)	Michael Marcagi	Alternative rock
9	Weird Faith	Madi Diaz	Rock; pop
9	Phasor	Helado Negro	Avant-pop
9	What Now	Brittany Howard	Garage rock; R&B
9	Dark Magic	Nothing,Nowhere	Emo rap
9	Magnet Factory	Pylon Reenactment Society	Alternative rock; indie rock
9	Quitter	Katelyn Tarver	Pop
9	Coming Home	Usher	R&B
9	She Reaches Out to She Reaches Out to She	Chelsea Wolfe	Gothic rock; doom metal
10	Vultures 1	Kanye West & Ty Dolla Sign	Hip hop
12	Rhapsody in Blue	Béla Fleck	Folk; country
14	Echoes from Forgotten Hearts	Vision Eternel	Ambient rock
16	Be Right Here	Blackberry Smoke	Southern rock
16	Nu King	Jason Derulo	Pop; R&B
16	Hole in My Head	Laura Jane Grace	Punk rock
16	Blu Wav	Grandaddy	Indie rock; space rock
16	This Is Me... Now	Jennifer Lopez	Pop; R&B
16	How I Fell	Elliot Moss	Alternative rock; indie pop
16	Gilded Sorrow	The Obsessed	Doom metal
16	Arms	San Fermin	Alternative rock; rock
23	Perpetual I Terminal	Darkest Hour	Melodic death metal; metalcore
23	The Past Is Still Alive	Hurray for the Riff Raff	Americana
23	Gloom Division	I Dont Know How but They Found Me	Indie pop; indie rock; new wave
23	Moon Healer	Job for a Cowboy	Technical death metal
23	Loss of Life	MGMT	Psychedelic pop
23	Daniel	Real Estate	Indie rock; indie pop
23	The Wolves Are Coming	Philip Sayce	Rock; blues

=== March ===
Date	Album	Artist	Genre(s)
1	Out of the Blue	Brynn Cartelli	Pop
1	I Got Heaven	Mannequin Pussy	Punk rock; indie rock
1	Hopiumforthemasses	Ministry	Industrial metal; alternative metal
1	Half Black Heart	New Years Day	Hard rock; alternative metal
1	Baptized By Fire	David Reece	Hard rock; heavy metal
1	Blue Lips	Schoolboy Q	Hip hop
1	Playing Favorites	Sheer Mag	Hard rock; power pop
8	Bleachers	Bleachers	Alternative rock; rock
8	Girl Friends	Dion	Rock; pop
8	Defectum Omnium	Exhorder	Thrash metal; groove metal
8	Eternal Sunshine	Ariana Grande	Pop; R&B
8	Luke Grimes	Luke Grimes	Country
8	Flora Ocean Tiger Bloom	Meatbodies	Garage rock; noise rock
8	Desperado Troubadours	Sawyer Brown	Country; country pop
15	Asylum	Atrophy	Thrash metal
15	Happiness Bastards	The Black Crowes	Hard rock; Southern rock
15	Rockmaker	The Dandy Warhols	Alternative rock; garage rock
15	Fine Ho, Stay	Flo Milli	Hip hop
15	Deep Sage	Gouge Away	Hardcore punk; punk rock
15	Deeper Well	Kacey Musgraves	Country
15	Every Sound Has a Color in the Valley of Night: Part 2	Night Verses	Alternative metal; post-hardcore
15	Higher Power	Scott Stapp	Rock; hard rock
15	Everything I Thought It Was	Justin Timberlake	Pop; R&B; funk
15	World Wide Whack	Tierra Whack	Hip hop
22	Born	Kenny Chesney	Country
22	JPEG Raw	Gary Clark Jr.	Rock; blues; R&B
22	Trail of Flowers	Sierra Ferrell	Americana; alternative country; bluegrass
22	We Don't Trust You	Future & Metro Boomin	Hip hop
22	Real Power	Gossip	Indie rock; dance-rock
22	Something in the Room She Moves	Julia Holter	Art pop
22	Change the Game	Cody Jinks	Country; outlaw country
22	Akoma	Jlin	Electronic
22	Bright Future	Adrianne Lenker	Folk
22	Young Love & Saturday Nights	Chris Young	Country
29	The Haunted House	Abandoned Pools	Alternative rock; electronic rock; indie rock
29	Cowboy Carter	Beyoncé	Country; pop; R&B
29	Live Laugh Love	Chastity Belt	Alternative rock; indie rock
29	Evolution	Sheryl Crow	Heartland rock; pop
29	All I Ever Want is Everything	Blu DeTiger	Indie pop; pop rock
29	The Hill	Aaron Lewis	Alternative country; country rock
29	Exotic Birds of Prey	Shabazz Palaces	Hip hop
29	Revelations	Sarah Shook & The Disarmers	Alternative country; indie rock

=== April ===
Date	Album	Artist	Genre(s)
5	There Are Worse Things Than Being Alive	Bayside	Pop-punk; emo; punk rock
5	Ohio Players	The Black Keys	Garage rock; alternative rock
5	Pollen	Blacktop Mojo	Rock; hard rock
5	Fireworks & Rollerblades	Benson Boone	Pop; rock
5	Found Heaven	Conan Gray	Pop; pop rock; synth-pop
5	1978	Jose James	Jazz; hip hop
5	Tori	Tori Kelly	Pop; R&B
5	Mantras	Katie Pruitt	Americana; alternative country
5	Dead Rebellion	Strung Out	Melodic hardcore; hardcore punk
5	Only God Was Above Us	Vampire Weekend	Indie rock; alternative rock
5	Townie	X Ambassadors	Indie pop; pop rock
12	Liminal	Belmont	Pop-punk; post-hardcore
12	Ghost Stories	Blue Öyster Cult	Hard rock; heavy metal
12	We Still Don't Trust You	Future & Metro Boomin	Hip hop
12	Hidden Places	The Higher	Pop rock
12	Tenderhearted Boys	Will Hoge	Southern rock; alternative country
12	Strong	Tyler Hubbard	Country
12	Enter: The Castle	Jakobs Castle	Alternative rock; indie rock; indie pop
12	Mean Streets	Riot V	Hard rock; heavy metal
12	Don't Forget Me	Maggie Rogers	Indie pop
12	Stellar Evolution	Aaron Lee Tasjan	Folk rock; rock
19	Duets - Ghosts on a Canvas Sessions	Glen Campbell	Country
19	Final Summer	Cloud Nothings	Indie rock; post-punk
19	Concrete Jungle	Steve Conte	Rock
19	Searching for Solace	The Ghost Inside	Hard rock; heavy metal
19	Cometh the Storm	High on Fire	Heavy metal; rock
19	But I'll Wait for You	Local Natives	Indie rock; alternative rock
19	Dark Matter	Pearl Jam	Rock; alternative rock; post-grunge
19	Damascus	Elvie Shane	Country
19	The Tortured Poets Department	Taylor Swift	Synth-pop; folk; pop rock
26	Mantras	Alien Ant Farm	Alternative rock; alternative metal
26	Banished by Sin	Deicide	Death metal; heavy metal
26	Foreverland	Keyon Harrold	Jazz
26	Light Verse	Iron & Wine	Folk rock; indie folk
26	Survived	Lost Dog Street Band	Country; folk
26	3+3	Tomeka Reid	Avant-garde jazz; musical improvisation
26	All Born Screaming	St. Vincent	Indie rock; art rock; alternative rock

=== May ===
Date	Album	Artist	Genre(s)
3	Super Magick	Better Than Ezra	Alternative rock
3	Bug	Kacy Hill	Alternative rock; indie rock
3	A Dream Is All We Know	The Lemon Twigs	Alternative rock; indie rock
3	Veritas	P.O.D.	Nu metal; alternative metal
3	With Love	Snarls	Alternative rock; indie rock
3	Infinity Now	Keith Wallen	Hard rock; alternative rock
3	Fearless Movement	Kamasi Washington	Jazz
10	Death Jokes	Amen Dunes	Alternative rock; indie rock
10	Remembrance	Chick Corea & Béla Fleck	Jazz
10	Vows	Hot Water Music	Punk rock; rock
10	Morning View XXIII	Incubus	Alternative rock; alternative metal
10	The Process	Judah & the Lion	Bluegrass; folk
10	Tennessee Truth	Brian Kelley	Country
10	Can We Please Have Fun	Kings of Leon	Rock; alternative rock
10	You Won't Go Before You're Supposed To	Knocked Loose	Metalcore; heavy metal
10	Oui, LSF	Les Savy Fav	Indie rock; noise rock
10	The Cycles of Trying to Cope	Like Moths to Flames	Metalcore; post-hardcore
10	Rise & Fall	Scotty McCreery	Country
10	Love Hate Music Box	Rainbow Kitten Surprise	Indie rock; indie pop; alternative rock
10	The Moon is in the Wrong Place	Shannon and the Clams	Garage punk; rockabilly
10	Killing for Revenge	Six Feet Under	Death metal
10	Sublime with Rome	Sublime with Rome	Reggae rock; alternative rock
13	Atavista	Childish Gambino	Alternative hip hop; alternative R&B; neo soul
17	The Avett Brothers	The Avett Brothers	Folk; rock
17	Neon Pill	Cage the Elephant	Alternative rock; garage rock; psychedelic rock
17	Here to Eternity	Collective Soul	Rock; alternative rock
17	Hit Me Hard and Soft	Billie Eilish	Alt-pop; progressive pop
17	Devoid of Love & Light	Extortionist	Hard rock; heavy metal
17	Dark Superstition	Gatecreeper	Death metal
17	For Real	Hampton Hawes	Jazz
17	Permanent Pleasure	Joywave	Indie rock; alternative rock
17	From Hell I Rise	Kerry King	Thrash metal; heavy metal
17	Moon & Stars	The Mavericks	Country; Tex-Mex
17	Still Kids	New Kids on the Block	Pop
17	Mind Burns Alive	Pallbearer	Doom metal
17	Please Don't Cry	Rapsody	Hip hop
17	To All Trains	Shellac	Post-hardcore; indie rock
24	Timing is Everything	Eric Alexander	Jazz; bebop
24	The Mosaic	Capstan	Post-hardcore; pop-punk
24	Frog in Boiling Water	DIIV	Alternative rock; indie rock
24	Blue Electric Light	Lenny Kravitz	Funk rock; rock
24	News Of The Universe	La Luz	Alternative rock; indie rock
24	...Is Committed	Say Anything	Pop-punk; alternative rock
24	Clancy	Twenty One Pilots	Alternative rock; alternative hip hop
24	Model	Wallows	Indie rock; alternative rock
31	Further Afield	+/-	Indie rock; indie pop
31	Pick Me Up Turn Me Upside Down	Another Michael	Alternative rock; indie rock
31	Reworks Vol. 1	Big Black Delta	Electronic rock; space rock
31	Jump Rope	Buffalo Tom	Alternative rock; indie rock
31	Chaos Angel	Maya Hawke	Folk rock
31	Tools of Oppression / Rule by Deception	The Hope Conspiracy	Hardcore punk
31	Submarine	The Marías	Indie pop; dream pop; alternative rock
31	Hot City	Bonnie McKee	Pop; synth-pop; dance-pop
31	Language Barrier	Mikel Rouse	Classical

=== June ===
Date	Album	Artist	Genre(s)
7	Forever	Bon Jovi	Rock; hard rock
7	Eels Time!	Eels	Indie rock; alternative rock
7	Out Here in It (EP)	Tracy Lawrence	Country
7	Why Lawd?	NxWorries	Hip hop; neo soul; R&B
7	Hummingbird	Carly Pearce	Country
7	A Trip a Stumble a Fall Down on Your Knees	Seasick Steve	Blues; country rock
7	Spinning Out	Shaed	Indie pop; pop rock
7	La Fleur	Kelley Stoltz	Alternative rock; indie rock
7	Timeless	Meghan Trainor	Pop
14	V	Black Country Communion	Blues rock; rock
14	Patch of Blue - Birth of a Legend (Live)	Tommy Bolin	Progressive rock; hard rock
14	Fathers & Sons	Luke Combs	Country
14	As It Ever Was, So It Will Be Again	The Decemberists	Indie rock; indie pop
14	The Early November	The Early November	Emo; pop-punk
14	The Return of Tomorrow	Fu Manchu	Rock; hard rock
14	Dopamine	Normani	R&B; pop
21	The Secret of Us	Gracie Abrams	Country pop; indie pop; folk
21	Gravity	The Dangerous Summer	Emo; alternative rock
21	Crash	Kehlani	R&B
21	Good Together	Lake Street Dive	Pop; indie rock
21	Chasing the Light (Live)	Jesse Malin	Rock; Americana
21	Youth	Mest	Punk rock; pop-punk
21	I Want to Disappear	The Story So Far	Pop-punk; emo
21	Medz	The Used	Emo; alternative rock; post-hardcore
21	Stigma	Wage War	Metalcore; hard rock; melodic hardcore
28	Gerry Beckley	Gerry Beckley	Folk; rock
28	C,XOXO	Camila Cabello	Pop; alt-pop; dance
28	Loom	Imagine Dragons	Alternative rock; pop rock; rock
28	Megan	Megan Thee Stallion	Hip hop
28	South of Here	Nathaniel Rateliff & the Night Sweats	Folk rock; blues rock; rock
28	Red Moon Rising	Robert Jon & the Wreck	Blues rock; Southern rock
28	Notes from a Quiet Life	Washed Out	Chillwave; indie pop

=== July ===
Date	Album	Artist	Genre(s)
4	The Great American Bar Scene	Zach Bryan	Country; country rock
12	X's	Cigarettes After Sex	Dream pop; indie rock
12	Charm	Clairo	Indie pop
12	The Death of Slim Shady (Coup de Grâce)	Eminem	Hip hop
12	Am I Okay?	Megan Moroney	Country
12	Ten	Mr. Big	Hard rock; rock
12	Artificial Paradise	OneRepublic	Pop rock
12	Evolve	Phish	Rock; progressive rock
12	Big Ideas	Remi Wolf	Pop; pop rock
19	Across the River of Stars	Beachwood Sparks	Alternative country
19	Bando Stone & the New World	Childish Gambino	Alternative hip hop; R&B; pop rock
19	As Above, So Below	Highly Suspect	Alternative rock; hard rock; rock
19	Kansas Anymore	Role Model	Indie pop; pop rock
19	No Name	Jack White	Rock; blues rock; garage rock
26	The Golden Years	Joshua Bassett	Pop rock; pop
26	At the Pink Rat	Cherry Poppin' Daddies	Rock; jazz
26	Y2K!	Ice Spice	Hip hop
26	God's Network: Reb7rth	Rakim	Hip hop
26	Smile! :D	Porter Robinson	Electronic; electropop
26	Children of the Moon	State Faults	Post-hardcore

=== August ===
Date	Album	Artist	Genre (s)
2	Vega	Anberlin	Hard rock; emo; alternative rock
2	Cellophane Memories	Chrystabell & David Lynch	Alternative rock; indie rock
2	Sincere	Khalid	R&B; pop
2	Songs for Sinners & Saints	Michael & the Mighty Midnight Revival	Gospel; Southern hip hop
2	My Town	Brian Ray	Rock
2	Aghori Mhori Mei	The Smashing Pumpkins	Alternative rock; rock
2	Smoke & Fiction	X	Punk rock; alternative rock
9	Trouble in Paradise	Chlöe	R&B
9	Funeral Soundtrack #4	Destroy Boys	Punk rock; pop-punk
9	Analysis Paralysis	Four Year Strong	Pop-punk; punk rock
9	Doing It For Me	Larry June	Hip-hop
9	Sugar Honey Iced Tea	Latto	Hip-hop
9	Bird's Eye	Ravyn Lenae	R&B
9	Love U Forever (EP)	Lil Mosey	Hip-hop
9	Ultra 85	Logic	Hip-hop
9	Call the Devil	Mushroomhead	Alternative metal; industrial metal
9	Sorcs 80	Osees	Garage rock
9	Life Till Bones	Oso Oso	Emo; pop rock
9	Hood Poet	Polo G	Hip-hop
16	Forever	Charly Bliss	Power pop; indie rock
16	Popular Monster	Falling in Reverse	Post-hardcore; metalcore; rap metal
16	Paradise State of Mind	Foster the People	Indie pop; alternative rock
16	Long Way Home	Ray LaMontagne	Americana; folk
16	F-1 Trillion	Post Malone	Country; country pop
16	Obsessed	Morgan Wade	Country
23	Short n' Sweet	Sabrina Carpenter	Pop
23	Power	Illuminati Hotties	Indie pop; indie rock
23	lovelytheband	lovelytheband	Indie pop; indie rock
23	Imaginal Disk	Magdalena Bay	Synth-pop; indie pop; electropop
23	Rock N Roll Your Heart Away	Nervous Eaters	Punk rock; rock
23	The Underworld Awaits Us All	Nile	Technical death metal; doom metal
23	About a Woman	Thomas Rhett	Country
23	BREAD	Sofi Tukker	House
23	Whirlwind	Lainey Wilson	Country
23	Relapse	Warren Zeiders	Country
30	Amelia	Laurie Anderson	Art pop; avant-garde
30	The Phantom Five	Awolnation	Alternative rock; indie rock
30	Better Me Than You	Big Sean	Hip-hop
30	Alligator Bites Never Heal	Doechii	Hip-hop
30	The Dichotomy	David Kushner	Rock; pop rock; gothic rock
30	My Favorite Dream	John Legend	Children's
30	Every Bridge Burning	Nails	Hardcore punk; heavy metal
30	Death or Glory	Palaye Royale	Art rock

=== September ===
Date	Album	Artist	Genre (s)
6	Glory	The Airborne Toxic Event	Alternative rock
6	Willson	Ashe	Electropop; pop rock
6	One More Time... Part-2	Blink-182	Pop-punk
6	What's Wrong with New York?	The Dare	Dance-punk; electropop; indie pop
6	The Death Card	Fame on Fire	Hard rock; rock; rap rock
6	Infinite Icon	Paris Hilton	Pop
6	The FORCE	LL Cool J	Hip hop
6	Born Horses	Mercury Rev	Indie rock; alternative rock
6	Cowboys and Dreamers	George Strait	Country
6	Hole Erth	Toro y Moi	Emo rap; indie pop; indie rock
13	I'm Not Afraid of Music Anymore	Coin	Indie pop; pop rock
13	Dayglow	Dayglow	Indie pop; indie rock; alternative rock
13	PLAYLIST of DOOM	Robert DeLong	Electronic rock; pop rock
13	Land of the Lost	Giovannie and the Hired Guns	Country rock
13	Rack	The Jesus Lizard	Noise rock; alternative rock
13	Postcards from Texas	Miranda Lambert	Country
13	No Restrictions	Jordin Sparks	R&B; hip hop soul; dance-pop
13	Moon Mirror	Nada Surf	Alternative rock; indie rock; power pop
20	Five Dice, All Threes	Bright Eyes	Indie rock
20	Surviving the Dream	Fidlar	Punk rock; garage rock
20	Flood	Hippo Campus	Indie rock; indie pop; alternative rock
20	Sink Your Teeth	Neon Trees	Alternative rock; pop rock
20	143	Katy Perry	Pop
20	Like All Before You	The Voidz	Rock
25	Dive	almost monday	Indie pop; alternative rock
27	Servitude	The Black Dahlia Murder	Melodic death metal
27	Mind of a Country Boy	Luke Bryan	Country
27	Until God Shows	Destroy Rebuild Until God Shows	Post-hardcore
27	Merry Christmas (Welcome to the Family)	Brett Eldredge	Christmas; country
27	Harlequin	Lady Gaga	Jazz; pop
27	Slowly But Shirley	Soul Asylum	Rock; alternative rock
27	Highway Prayers	Billy Strings	Bluegrass

=== October ===
Date	Album	Artist	Genre (s)
4	With You in Spirit	Balance and Composure	Emo; alternative rock
4	Dream Fist	Eve 6	Rock; alternative rock
4	Darker White	Fever 333	Rap metal; hardcore punk; hard rock
4	For Cryin' Out Loud!	Finneas	Alternative pop; indie rock
4	The Christmas Record	Little Big Town	Christmas; country
10	Encuentros	Becky G	Latin pop
11	Take Care	BigXthaPlug	Hip hop
11	Glorious	GloRilla	Hip hop
11	Beautifully Broken	Jelly Roll	Country
11	The Art of Letting Go	Myles Kennedy	Hard rock; rock
11	No Obligation	The Linda Lindas	Pop-punk; pop rock
11	Supercharged	The Offspring	Punk rock
11	Spiral in a Straight Line	Touché Amoré	Post-hardcore
11	Last Lap	Rod Wave	Hip hop; R&B
18	The Key to What	Bear Hands	Indie rock; indie pop; alternative rock
18	I Want Blood	Jerry Cantrell	Rock; hard rock
18	It's Officially Christmas: The Double Album	Dan + Shay	Christmas; country
18	The Gift of Love	Jennifer Hudson	Christmas; R&B
18	Heavy Lifting	MC5	Rock; hard rock
18	Memory of a Day	Phantogram	Indie pop
25	Full Bloom	311	Alternative rock; rap rock; reggae rock
25	Patterns	Kelsea Ballerini	Country
25	Melt	Beach Weather	Alternative rock; pop rock
25	The Great Impersonator	Halsey	Pop rock; alternative rock
25	Asteroid	Anya Marina	Indie rock; indie pop
25	robbietheused	robbietheused	Alternative rock; pop rock; indie pop
28	Chromakopia	Tyler, the Creator	Alternative hip hop

=== November ===
Date	Album	Artist	Genre (s)
1	Lightless	As Friends Rust	Melodic hardcore
1	Revolution	Skillet	Christian rock; hard rock
8	Soul Burger	Ab-Soul	Hip hop
8	State Champs	State Champs	Pop-punk; punk rock
15	Through Storms Ahead	As I Lay Dying	Metalcore; heavy metal
15	Aftercare	Nessa Barrett	Alternative pop; dark pop; electropop
15	Burnout	BoyWithUke	Indie pop; pop rock; alternative rock
15	Persona	half•alive	Indie pop; alternative rock
15	Uncharted (EP)	Less Than Jake	Punk rock; ska punk
15	From Zero	Linkin Park	Alternative rock; nu metal; rock
15	Everyday Royalty (EP)	Anthony Raneri	Alternative rock; rock
15	Bouquet	Gwen Stefani	Pop rock; soft rock; new wave
15	Deep in the Blue	Tiny Moving Parts	Indie rock; indie pop; emo
22	Merciless	Body Count	Rap metal; thrash metal; heavy metal
22	Nobody Loves You More	Kim Deal	Alternative rock; rock
22	Man Down	Ice Cube	Hip hop
22	GNX	Kendrick Lamar	Hip hop
22	One Assassination Under God - Chapter 1	Marilyn Manson	Industrial metal; alternative metal; hard rock
22	Mahashmashana	Father John Misty	Indie rock; indie folk
29	The Party Never Ends	Juice Wrld	Hip hop

=== December ===
Date	Album	Artist	Genre (s)
6	Live at Third Man Records (Live)	Interpol	Indie rock
6	12	White Denim	Indie rock
6	I Just Got a Lot on My Shoulders	YoungBoy Never Broke Again	Hip hop
13	Glad You Came	Mario	R&B
13	Rome (Live)	The National	Rock; indie rock
13	Missionary	Snoop Dogg	Hip hop
14	Happy Birthday	Blue October	Rock; alternative rock
20	Lana	SZA	R&B
24	Muddy Waters Too	Redman	Hip hop

== Top songs on record ==
=== Billboard Hot 100 No. 1 Songs ===
- "A Bar Song (Tipsy)" – Shaboozey (19 weeks)
- "All I Want for Christmas Is You" – Mariah Carey (2 weeks in 2019, 2 weeks in 2020, 2 weeks in 2021, 5 weeks in 2022, 3 weeks in 2023, 3 weeks in 2024)
- "Carnival" – Kanye West and Ty Dolla Sign feat. Rich the Kid and Playboi Carti (1 week)
- "Fortnight" – Taylor Swift feat. Post Malone (2 weeks)
- "Hiss" – Megan Thee Stallion (1 week)
- "I Had Some Help" – Post Malone feat. Morgan Wallen (6 weeks)
- "Like That" – Future, Metro Boomin and Kendrick Lamar (3 weeks)
- "Lose Control" – Teddy Swims (1 week)
- "Love Somebody" – Morgan Wallen (1 week)
- "Lovin on Me" – Jack Harlow (1 week in 2023, 5 weeks in 2024)
- "Not Like Us" – Kendrick Lamar (2 weeks)
- "Please Please Please" – Sabrina Carpenter (1 week)
- "Rockin' Around the Christmas Tree" – Brenda Lee (2 weeks in 2023, 1 week in 2024)
- "Squabble Up" – Kendrick Lamar (1 week)
- "Texas Hold 'Em" – Beyoncé (2 weeks)
- "Too Sweet" – Hozier (1 week)
- "We Can't Be Friends (Wait for Your Love)" – Ariana Grande (1 week)
- "Yes, And?" – Ariana Grande (1 week)

=== Billboard Hot 100 Top 20 Hits ===
All songs that reached the Top 20 on the Billboard Hot 100 chart during the year, complete with peak chart placement.

- "7 Minute Drill" – J. Cole (#6)
- "25" – Rod Wave (#16)
- "28" – Zach Bryan (#14)
- "A Bar Song (Tipsy)" – Shaboozey (#1)
- "A Holly Jolly Christmas" – Burl Ives (#4 in 2020, #5 in 2024)
- "Act II: Date @ 8" – 4Batz feat. Drake (#7)
- "Agora Hills" – Doja Cat (#7)
- "Ain't No Love in Oklahoma" – Luke Combs (#13)
- "All I Want for Christmas Is You" – Mariah Carey (#1)
- "All of Me" – 21 Savage (#18)
- "All Red" – Playboi Carti (#15)
- "Apt." – Rosé and Bruno Mars (#8)
- "Austin" – Dasha (#18)
- "Band4Band" – Central Cee and Lil Baby (#18)
- "Beautiful Things" – Benson Boone (#2)
- "Bed Chem" – Sabrina Carpenter (#14)
- "Birds of a Feather" – Billie Eilish (#2)
- "Blue Christmas" – Elvis Presley (#18)
- "But Daddy I Love Him" – Taylor Swift (#7)
- "Carnival" – Kanye West and Ty Dolla Sign feat. Rich the Kid and Playboi Carti (#1)
- "Chihiro" – Billie Eilish (#12)
- "Christmas (Baby Please Come Home)" – Darlene Love (#15)
- "Cinderella" – Future, Metro Boomin and Travis Scott (#6)
- "Cowgirls" – Morgan Wallen feat. Ernest (#12)
- "Crocodile Tearz" – J. Cole (#19)
- "Cruel Summer" – Taylor Swift (#1 in 2023, #2 in 2024)
- "Dancing in the Flames" – The Weeknd (#14)
- "Darling, I" – Tyler, the Creator feat. Teezo Touchdown (#15)
- "Deck the Halls" – Nat King Cole (#16 in 2022, #17 in 2024)
- "Die with a Smile" – Lady Gaga and Bruno Mars (#2)
- "Dodger Blue" – Kendrick Lamar feat. Wallie the Sensei, Siete7x and Roddy Ricch (#11)
- "Down Bad" – Taylor Swift (#2)
- "End of Beginning" – Djo (#11)
- "Enough (Miami)" – Cardi B (#9)
- "Espresso" – Sabrina Carpenter (#3)
- "Euphoria" – Kendrick Lamar (#3)
- "Facts" – Tom MacDonald and Ben Shapiro (#16)
- "Family Matters" – Drake (#7)
- "Fast Car" – Luke Combs (#2 in 2023, #8 in 2024)
- "Feliz Navidad" – José Feliciano (#6 in 2021, #8 in 2024)
- "Florida!!!" – Taylor Swift feat. Florence and the Machine (#8)
- "Flowers" – Miley Cyrus (#1 in 2023, #10 in 2024)
- "Fortnight" – Taylor Swift feat. Post Malone (#1)
- "Fresh Out the Slammer" – Taylor Swift (#11)
- "FTCU" – Nicki Minaj (#15)
- "Get It Sexyy" – Sexyy Red (#20)
- "Good Graces" – Sabrina Carpenter (#15)
- "Good Luck, Babe!" – Chappell Roan (#4)
- "Greedy" – Tate McRae (#3)
- "Guess" – Charli XCX feat. Billie Eilish (#12)
- "Guilty as Sin?" – Taylor Swift (#10)
- "Guy for That" – Post Malone feat. Luke Combs (#17)
- "Habits" – Eminem and White Gold (#19)
- "Heart Pt. 6" – Kendrick Lamar (#14)
- "Hey Now" – Kendrick Lamar feat. Dody6 (#5)
- "Hiss" – Megan Thee Stallion (#1)
- "Hot to Go!" – Chappell Roan (#15)
- "Houdini" – Eminem (#2)
- "I Am Not Okay" – Jelly Roll (#14)
- "I Can Do It with a Broken Heart" – Taylor Swift (#3)
- "I Can Fix Him (No Really I Can)" – Taylor Swift (#20)
- "I Had Some Help" – Post Malone feat. Morgan Wallen (#1)
- "I Like the Way You Kiss Me" – Artemas (#12)
- "I Love You, I'm Sorry" – Gracie Abrams (#19)
- "I Remember Everything" – Zach Bryan feat. Kacey Musgraves (#1 in 2023, #4 in 2024)
- "Ice Attack" – Future and Metro Boomin (#13)
- "II Most Wanted" – Beyoncé and Miley Cyrus (#6)
- "Is It Over Now?" – Taylor Swift (#1 in 2023, #13 in 2024)
- "It's Beginning to Look a Lot Like Christmas" – Michael Bublé (#15)
- "It's OK I'm OK" – Tate McRae (#20)
- "It's the Most Wonderful Time of the Year" – Andy Williams (#5 in 2021, #6 in 2024)
- "Jingle Bell Rock" – Bobby Helms (#3)
- "Jingle Bells" – Frank Sinatra (#16)
- "Jolene" – Beyoncé (#7)
- "La Diabla" – Xavi (#20)
- "Last Christmas" – Wham! (#3)
- "Last Night" – Morgan Wallen (#1 in 2023, #8 in 2024)
- "Let It Snow, Let It Snow, Let It Snow" – Dean Martin (#7)
- "Levii's Jeans" – Beyoncé and Post Malone (#16)
- "Lies Lies Lies" – Morgan Wallen (#7)
- "Like That" – Future, Metro Boomin and Kendrick Lamar (#1)
- "Lil Boo Thang" – Paul Russell (#14)
- "Loml" – Taylor Swift (#12)
- "Lose Control" – Teddy Swims (#1)
- "Love Somebody" – Morgan Wallen (#1)
- "Lovin on Me" – Jack Harlow (#1)
- "Lunch" – Billie Eilish (#5)
- "Luther" – Kendrick Lamar and SZA (#3)
- "Made for Me" – Muni Long (#20)
- "Man at the Garden" – Kendrick Lamar (#9)
- "Meet the Grahams" – Kendrick Lamar (#12)
- "Miles on It" – Marshmello and Kane Brown (#15)
- "Million Dollar Baby" – Tommy Richman (#2)
- "My Boy Only Breaks His Favorite Toys" – Taylor Swift (#6)
- "Née-Nah" – 21 Savage, Travis Scott and Metro Boomin (#10)
- "Never Lose Me" – Flo Milli (#15)
- "N.H.I.E." – 21 Savage and Doja Cat (#19)
- "Noid" – Tyler, the Creator (#10)
- "Not Like Us" – Kendrick Lamar (#1)
- "Obsessed" – Olivia Rodrigo (#14)
- "Paint the Town Red" – Doja Cat (#1 in 2023, #4 in 2024)
- "Peekaboo" – Kendrick Lamar feat. AzChike (#13)
- "Pink Skies" – Zach Bryan (#6)
- "Please Please Please" – Sabrina Carpenter (#1)
- "Pour Me a Drink" – Post Malone feat. Blake Shelton (#12)
- "Pretty Little Poison" – Warren Zeiders (#19)
- "Push Ups" – Drake (#17)
- "Rah Tah Tah" – Tyler, the Creator (#16)
- "Redrum" – 21 Savage (#5)
- "Reincarnated" – Kendrick Lamar (#8)
- "Renaissance" – Eminem (#20)
- "Rich Baby Daddy" – Drake feat. Sexyy Red and SZA (#11 in 2023, #16 in 2024)
- "Rockin' Around the Christmas Tree" – Brenda Lee (#1)
- "Santa Baby" – Eartha Kitt with Henri René and His Orchestra (#20)
- "Santa Tell Me" – Ariana Grande (#9)
- "Saturn" – SZA (#6)
- "Selfish" – Justin Timberlake (#19)
- "Skinny" – Billie Eilish (#18)
- "Sleigh Ride" – The Ronettes (#8 in 2023, #10 in 2024)
- "Slimed In" – Future and Metro Boomin (#20)
- "Snooze" – SZA (#2 in 2023, #5 in 2024)
- "So Long, London" – Taylor Swift (#5)
- "Squabble Up" – Kendrick Lamar (#1)
- "St. Chroma" – Tyler, the Creator feat. Daniel Caesar (#7)
- "Stargazing" – Myles Smith (#20)
- "Stick Season" – Noah Kahan (#9)
- "Sticky" – Tyler, the Creator feat. GloRilla, Sexyy Red and Lil Wayne (#10)
- "Supernatural" – Ariana Grande (#17)
- "Taste" – Sabrina Carpenter (#2)
- "Texas Hold 'Em" – Beyoncé (#1)
- "That's So True" – Gracie Abrams (#6)
- "The Alchemy" – Taylor Swift (#13)
- "The Boy Is Mine" – Ariana Grande (#16)
- "The Christmas Song (Merry Christmas to You)" – Nat King Cole (#9 in 2023, #12 in 2024)
- "The Smallest Man Who Ever Lived" – Taylor Swift (#14)
- "The Tortured Poets Department" – Taylor Swift (#4)
- "Thinkin' Bout Me" – Morgan Wallen (#7 in 2023, #11 in 2024)
- "Thriller" – Michael Jackson (#4 in 1984, #20 in 2024)
- "Timeless" – The Weeknd and Playboi Carti (#3)
- "Too Sweet" – Hozier (#1)
- "TV Off" – Kendrick Lamar feat. Lefty Gunplay (#2)
- "Type Shit" – Future, Metro Boomin, Travis Scott and Playboi Carti (#2)
- "Underneath the Tree" – Kelly Clarkson (#10)
- "Wacced Out Murals" – Kendrick Lamar (#4)
- "Wanna Be" – GloRilla and Megan Thee Stallion (#11)
- "Water" – Tyla (#7)
- "We Can't Be Friends (Wait for Your Love)" – Ariana Grande (#1)
- "We Don't Trust You" – Future and Metro Boomin (#8)
- "What Was I Made For?" – Billie Eilish (#14 in 2023, #16 in 2024)
- "Whatchu Kno About Me" – GloRilla and Sexyy Red (#17)
- "Whatever She Wants" – Bryson Tiller (#19)
- "White Christmas" – Bing Crosby (#12 in 1962, #14 in 2024)
- "White Horse" – Chris Stapleton (#12 in 2023, #17 in 2024)
- "Who" – Jimin (#12)
- "Who's Afraid of Little Old Me?" – Taylor Swift (#9)
- "Wildflower" – Billie Eilish (#17)
- "Yeah!" – Usher feat. Lil Jon and Ludacris (#1 in 2004, #20 in 2024)
- "Yes, And?" – Ariana Grande (#1)
- "Young Metro" – Future, Metro Boomin and The Weeknd (#9)

== Deaths ==
- January 4 – David Soul, 80, singer, actor
- January 5 – Larry Collins, 79, guitarist, songwriter (The Collins Kids)
- January 8 – Phil Niblock, 90, composer
- January 9 – James Kottak, 61, hard rock drummer (Kottak, Scorpions, Wild Horses, etc.)
- January 10 – Audie Blaylock, 61, bluegrass singer, guitarist
- January 12 – Bill Hayes, 98, singer, actor
- January 13 – Jo-El Sonnier, 77, singer-songwriter, accordionist
- January 16 – Peter Schickele, 88, classical composer, musical satirist (P. D. Q. Bach)
- January 18 – The Soft Moon, 44, darkwave singer-songwriter, producer
- January 19 –
  - Marlena Shaw, 81, jazz, blues, and soul singer
  - Mary Weiss, 75, pop singer (The Shangri-Las)
- January 23 –
  - Melanie, 76, folk singer, songwriter, guitarist
  - Margo Smith, 84, Christian and country music singer
- January 26 – Dean Brown, 68, jazz fusion guitarist, session musician
- January 30 – Chita Rivera, 91, singer, actress, dancer
- February 2 – Wayne Kramer, 75, rock guitarist (MC5)
- February 5 – Toby Keith, 62, country music singer-songwriter, actor, producer
- February 28 – Cat Janice, 31, pop singer-songwriter
- March 3 – Brit Turner, 57, drummer (Blackberry Smoke)
- March 5 – Debra Byrd, 72, vocal coach and actress
- March 11 –
  - Eric Carmen, 74, rock singer-songwriter, guitarist (Raspberries)
  - Boss, 54, rapper
- April 5 – C. J. Snare, 64, hard rock and metal singer (FireHouse)
- April 7 – Clarence "Frogman" Henry, 87, R&B singer and pianist
- April 18 –
  - Dickey Betts, 80, rock guitarist and singer-songwriter (The Allman Brothers Band)
  - Mandisa, 47, gospel singer, contestant on American Idol season 5
- May 7 – Steve Albini, 61, rock singer-songwriter, guitarist, producer, engineer (Big Black, Shellac)
- May 9 – Dennis Thompson, 75, rock drummer (MC5)
- May 12 – David Sanborn, 78, jazz and R&B saxophonist
- May 22 – Charlie Colin, 58, pop rock bassist (Train)
- May 24 – Doug Ingle, 78, rock singer, organist (Iron Butterfly)
- May 25 – Richard M. Sherman, 95, musical film songwriter (Sherman Brothers)
- June 3 – Brother Marquis, 58, rapper (2 Live Crew)
- June 11 – Enchanting, 26, rapper
- June 24 – Shifty Shellshock, 49, rock singer and rapper (Crazy Town)
- June 26 – Kinky Friedman, 79, country music singer-songwriter
- July 22 – Duke Fakir, 88, soul and R&B singer (Four Tops)
- July 28 – Chino XL, 50, rapper and actor
- August 13 – Greg Kihn, 75, rock musician and radio personality (The Greg Kihn Band)
- August 30 – Fatman Scoop, 53, rapper
- September 5 – Rich Homie Quan, 34, rapper
- September 10 – Frankie Beverly, 77, soul and funk singer (Maze)
- September 15 – Tito Jackson, 70, R&B and blues singer-songwriter, guitarist (The Jackson 5)
- September 28 – Kris Kristofferson, 88, country music singer, songwriter, actor
- October 7 – Cissy Houston, 91, soul and gospel singer (The Sweet Inspirations, The Drinkard Singers)
- October 12 – Ka, 52, rapper, lyricist (Natural Elements)
- November 3 – Quincy Jones, 91, music producer and composer
- November 24 – Bob Bryar, 44, rock drummer (My Chemical Romance)
- December 17 –
  - Mike Brewer, 80, folk rock singer-songwriter, guitarist (Brewer & Shipley)
  - David Mallett, 73, folk singer-songwriter
- December 26 – OG Maco, 32, rapper
