= Prove It (21 Savage and Summer Walker song) =

2024 song by 21 Savage and Summer Walker

Single by 21 Savage and Summer Walker

from the album American Dream
- Released: June 4, 2024
- Recorded: 2023
- Genre: Hip-hop; R&B
- Length: 3:27
- Label: Epic; Slaughter Gang
- Songwriters: Shéyaa Abraham-Joseph; Summer Walker; Keith Thomas; Tauren Stovall; Isaiah Brown; Edward Cooper III; Tye Gibson; Faith Evans; Carl Thompson
- Producers: ibmixing; Coupe; Tye Beats

21 Savage singles chronology
"Née-Nah" (2024)	"Prove It" (2024)	"GBP" (2025)

Summer Walker singles chronology
"Songs About U" (2024)	"Prove It" (2024)	"Heart of a Woman" (2024)

"Prove It" is a song by British-American rapper 21 Savage and American singer Summer Walker. It was sent to US rhythmic radio through Slaughter Gang and Epic Records as the fourth and final single from the former's third studio album, American Dream, on June 4, 2024. Produced by ibmixing, Coupe and Tye Beats, the song contains a sample of "You Are My Joy (Interlude)" by Faith Evans.

== Critical reception ==
The song received generally positive reviews from music critics. Robin Murray of Clash remarked that the song has a "beautiful feature from Summer Walker", which he described as among the most creative moments in American Dream. Teejay Small of HotNewHipHop also praised Walker's performance, describing it as "heavenly vocal". Grant Rindner of Variety cited the line "Talk about me in your stories / Bae, sub-tweet me" as one of the album's "standout bars". Matthew Ritchie of Pitchfork had a mixed reaction to the song, writing it "falls short of the intrinsic charisma produced by the likes of a Busta Rhymes and Mariah Carey collaboration: 21's materialistically vapid bars are washed away by Walker's runs, which feel as though they belong to one of her emotionally charged ballads."

== Charts ==
=== Weekly charts ===
Weekly chart performance for "Prove It"
Chart (2024)	Peak position
Canada Hot 100 (Billboard)	41
Global 200 (Billboard)	65
New Zealand Hot Singles (RMNZ)	19
Portugal (AFP)	167
US Billboard Hot 100	43
US Hot R&B/Hip-Hop Songs (Billboard)	19
US Rhythmic Airplay (Billboard)	1

=== Year-end charts ===
Year-end chart performance for "Prove It"
Chart (2024)	Position
US Hot R&B/Hip-Hop Songs (Billboard)	43
US Rhythmic (Billboard)	35

== Certifications ==
Certifications for "Prove It"
Region	Certification	Certified units/sales
Canada (Music Canada)	Gold	40,000^{‡}
New Zealand (RMNZ)	Platinum	30,000^{‡}
United Kingdom (BPI)	Silver	200,000^{‡}
United States (RIAA)	Platinum	1,000,000^{‡}
^{‡} Sales+streaming figures based on certification alone.
