= Fools for the Fleeting =

Studio album by Katie Pruitt
- Released: September 18, 2026
- Length: 42:14
- Labels: Rounder; Concord Music Group
- Producers: Katie Pruitt; Isaiah Beard

Katie Pruitt chronology
The Pleasantville Sessions (2025)	Fools for the Fleeting (2026)

Fools for the Fleeting is the third studio album by the American singer-songwriter Katie Pruitt. It was released on September 18, 2026, by Rounder Records in association with Concord Music Group.

== Background ==
Fools for the Fleeting was announced by Pruitt on June 12, 2026. In a press release, Pruitt stated that the album stemmed from her constantly trying to navigate through "a world that feels aggressively chaotic and constantly in flux." The album was co-produced by Pruitt and Isaiah Beard.

== Promotion ==
The album's lead single, "Blackout", was released on June 12, 2026 in tandem with the album's announcement. The second single, "Little Boxes", was released on July 24, 2026. The third single, "The Aftermath", was released on August 21, 2026.

Pruitt will support the album with a headlining tour that is set to begin on September 23, 2026 in Raleigh, North Carolina and conclude on December 2, 2026 in Nashville, Tennessee.

== Track listing ==
All tracks are written by Katie Pruitt, with additional co-writers indicated below where applicable.

Fools for the Fleeting track listing
No.	Title	Writer(s)	Length
1.	"Matching Tattoos"	Daniel Tashian	3:29
2.	"The Aftermath"		4:03
3.	"Blackout" (with Nolan Taylor)	Nolan Taylor; Jake Finch; Collin Pastore	4:16
4.	"Disaster"		3:35
5.	"Little Boxes"		4:33
6.	"Not Scared to Die"		3:52
7.	"Fools for the Fleeting"		4:54
8.	"If I Call You Mine"		4:39
9.	"Orion's Belt" (featuring Sierra Hull)		4:10
10.	"As Far as Forever"		4:43
Total length:			42:14

== Personnel ==
Credits are adapted from Tidal.

- Katie Pruitt – vocals, acoustic guitar, background vocals, co-production
- Isaiah Beard – bass guitar, guitars, lap steel guitar, production, mixing
- Juan Solorzano – guitars, pedal steel guitar
- Jess Nolan – background vocals
- Rhees Williams – bass guitar
- Maggie Chafee – cello
- Aksel Coe – drums
- Jake Finch – drums
- David Crutcher – keyboards
- Sierra Hull – mandolin
- Collin Pastore – pedal steel guitar
- Laura Epling – violin
- Jeremy Bernstein – recording
- Paul Blakemore – mastering
- Nolan Taylor – vocals on "Blackout"
