= Socialized Hate =

Studio album by Atrophy
- Released: November 7, 1988
- Recorded: 1988
- Studio: Music Grinder and EQ Sound, Los Angeles, California; Pacific Studio, Chatsworth, California
- Genre: Thrash metal
- Length: 37:37
- Label: Roadrunner
- Producer: Bill Metoyer, Atrophy

Atrophy chronology
Socialized Hate (1988)	Violent by Nature (1990)

Professional ratings
Review scores
Source	Rating
AllMusic	link

Socialized Hate is the debut studio album by American thrash metal band Atrophy. It was released on Roadrunner Records in 1988 and followed two successful demo cassettes produced by the band the previous year. It was followed up two years later by the band's second studio album, Violent By Nature (1990). The album was co-produced by prolific producer/engineer, Bill Metoyer, who became famous for his work on early Slayer albums and went on to produce many heavy metal albums released in the 1980s and 1990s, mainly on Metal Blade Records.

== Track listing ==
1. "Chemical Dependency" (James Gulotta, Tim Kelly, Chris Lykins, Rick Skowron, Atrophy) – 4:04
2. "Killing Machine" (James Gulotta, Brian Zimmerman, Chris Lykins) – 3:43
3. "Matter of Attitude" (Lykins) – 3:25
4. "Preacher, Preacher" (Gulotta, Lykins, Zimmerman) – 4:15
5. "Beer Bong" (Lykins, Lehman) – 2:01
6. "Socialized Hate" (Lykins, Atrophy) – 5:01
7. "Best Defense" (Lykins, Gulotta) – 3:46
8. "Product of the Past" (Lykins) – 3:48
9. "Rest in Pieces" (Lykins, Zimmerman) – 4:39
10. "Urban Decay" (Lykins) – 3:29

== Credits ==
- Brian Zimmerman – vocals
- Chris Lykins – guitar
- Rick Skowron – guitar
- James Gulotta – bass
- Tim Kelly – drums
- Recorded at Music Grinder and EQ Sound Studios, Hollywood, and Pacific Studio, Chatsworth, California
- Produced by Bill Metoyer and Atrophy
- Engineered and mixed by Bill Metoyer
- Mixed at Track Records, North Hollywood
- Cover art by Brian Anderson
