= Violent by Nature =

Studio album by Atrophy
- Released: March 26, 1990
- Recorded: 1989
- Studio: Track Record, North Hollywood
- Genre: Thrash metal
- Length: 40:28
- Label: Roadrunner
- Producer: Bill Metoyer; Atrophy

Atrophy chronology
Socialized Hate (1988)	Violent by Nature (1990)	Asylum (2024)

Professional ratings
Review scores
Source	Rating
Allmusic	link

Violent by Nature is the second album from Arizona thrash metal band Atrophy, released in 1990 on Roadrunner Records. Like their previous album Socialized Hate, it was co-produced by prolific producer/engineer Bill Metoyer, and recorded in Los Angeles. The band followed up the album with tours of the US and Europe with the likes of Sacred Reich, Coroner and Forced Entry. However shortly after, Chris Lykins left the band to pursue a medical school course and the band split up after Roadrunner Records lost confidence in the band due to the departure of one of its leading songwriters; as such, Violent by Nature would be Atrophy's final album for 34 years, until the release of their third album Asylum in March 2024. The model for the artwork was Richie Bujinowski (now Cavalera), who would later become Max Cavalera's adopted stepson and the frontman of Incite.

== Track listing ==
1. "Puppies and Friends" (Chris Lykins, Rick Skowron, Tim Kelly) – 3:32
2. "Violent by Nature" (Lykins, Kelly) – 3:54
3. "In Their Eyes" (Lykins, James Gulotta, Skowron, Kelly) – 5:02
4. "Too Late to Change" (Lykins, Gulotta) – 5:29
5. "Slipped Through the Cracks" (Lykins) – 5:28
6. "Forgotten But Not Gone" (Brian Zimmerman, Gulotta, Kelly) – 5:00
7. "Process of Elimination" (Zimmerman, Gulotta, Kelly) – 4:46
8. "Right to Die" (Zimmerman, Gulotta, Kelly) – 4:00
9. "Things Change" (Lykins) – 4:05

== Credits ==
- Brian Zimmerman – vocals
- Chris Lykins – guitar
- Rick Skowron – guitar
- James Gulotta – bass
- Tim Kelly – drums
- Kevin Sparks – 12-string guitar on "Too Late to Change"
- Recorded and mixed at Track Record, North Hollywood, California, USA
- Produced by Bill Metoyer and Atrophy
- Engineered and mixed by Bill Metoyer
- Second engineered by Ken Paulakovich
- Mastered by Eddie Schreyer at Futuredisc, Hollywood, USA
- Cover art by Paul Stottler
