= Kids Table =

EP by Bright Eyes
- Released: October 3, 2025
- Length: 29:03
- Label: Dead Oceans

Bright Eyes chronology
| Five Dice, All Threes (2024) | Kids Table (2025) |

Kids Table is an EP by American rock band Bright Eyes.

== Track listing ==
| No. | Title | Length |
|---|---|---|
| 1. | "Kids Table" (featuring Hurray for the Riff Raff) | 3:55 |
| 2. | "Cairns (When Your Heart Belongs to Everyone)" | 3:07 |
| 3. | "1st World Blues" | 4:21 |
| 4. | "Sharp Cutting Wings (Song to a Poet)" (featuring Leslie Stevens) | 3:33 |
| 5. | "It Always Feels Good and It Never Hurts" | 0:54 |
| 6. | "Dyslexic Palindrome" (featuring Hurray for the Riff Raff) | 4:02 |
| 7. | "Shakespeare in a Nutshell" | 4:56 |
| 8. | "Victory City" | 4:15 |

== Personnel ==
- Conor Oberst
- Nate Walcott
- Mike Mogis

=== Additional musicians ===
- Jason Boesel (Drums: Tracks 2, 3, 8; Percussion:3,8)
- Vikram Devasthali(Trobone: Track 3)
- Michaela Favara (Vocal 3)
- Griffin Goldsmith (drums: tracks 1, 6, 8; percussion: tracks 1, 2, 3, 6, 8; vocal: track 1)
- Josh Johnson (alto saxophone: track 3)
- amie Montes (vocal: track 3)
- Alex Orange Drink (vocal: tracks 1, 2, 3, 6, 8)
- Alynda Segarra of Hurray for the Riff Raff (vocal: track 1, 6)
- Leslie Stevens (vocals: track 4)
- Macey Taylor (bass: tracks 1, 2, 3, 6, 8)
