= Expectations (Katie Pruitt album) =

Studio album by Katie Pruitt
- Released: February 21, 2020
- Studios: Minutia (Nashville, Tennessee)
- Genre: Country
- Length: 46:47
- Label: Rounder
- Producers: Katie Pruitt; Michael Robinson

Katie Pruitt chronology
Expectations (2020)	Mantras (2024)

Expectations is the debut studio album by the American singer-songwriter Katie Pruitt, released by Rounder Records on February 21, 2020. The album has received positive reviews from critics. The album is made up of compositions about Pruitt's life. On November 24, 2020, Expectations was nominated for a Grammy Award for Best Engineered Album, Non-Classical.

== Reception ==
Professional ratings
Aggregate scores
Source	Rating
Metacritic	76/100
Review scores
Source	Rating
American Songwriter	4/5 stars
Exclaim!	8/10
Paste	7/10
Pitchfork	7.0/10

According to the review aggregator Metacritic, Expectations received "generally favorable reviews" based on a weighted average score of 76 out of 100 from four critic scores. Album of the Year characterized the critical consensus as a 75 out of 100. For Paste, Eric R. Danton gave Expectations a seven out of 10, praising the emotional depth of the lyrics but criticizing formulaic songwriting and some lyrics that fall flat. Sam Sodomsky of Pitchfork gave it the same rating, writing that it has strong arrangements and stately ballads. In Exclaim!, Scott Roos gave it an eight out of 10 for truth-telling lyrics and a "first-rate" band. American Songwriter's Hal Horowitz scored Expectations at four out of five for wise production that accentuates her lyrics, along with a balance of musical genres. Introducing Pruitt for a feature, Kelly McCartney of No Depression, called the release "stunning" and continued, "As an artist’s opening statement, the album is bold and beautiful, impactful and entertaining. It’s an exercise in courage so exquisitely raw that Brown would surely be proud of it." Joseph Hudak of Rolling Stone praised Pruitt's "nimble guitar playing" and "elastic voice". NPR's Jewly Hight characterized the album with, "Pruitt's done that with such clarity of expression and disarming intimacy—Expectations is aesthetically warmhearted even in its tensest moments of confrontation—that she's given her own family a greater understanding of her experience".

== Track listing ==
All songs written by Katie Pruitt, except where noted.

1. "Wishful Thinking" – 5:10
2. "My Mind's a Ship (That's Going Down)" (Jess Nolan and Pruitt) – 4:00
3. "Expectations" (Ross McReynolds and Pruitt) – 3:55
4. "Out of the Blue" – 5:13
5. "Normal" – 5:12
6. "Grace Has a Gun" – 4:21
7. "Searching for the Truth" – 4:32
8. "Georgia" – 4:11
9. "Loving Her" – 5:04
10. "It's Always Been You" – 5:13

== Personnel ==
Credits are adapted from the album's liner notes.

- Katie Pruitt – electric guitar, acoustic guitar, vocals, background vocals, liner notes, production
- Michael Robinson –production, recording, electric guitar, acoustic guitar, baritone guitar, additional keyboards, additional percussion, additional programming, string arrangement on "Expectations"
- Gary Paczosa – recording, mixing
- Paul Blakemore – mastering
- Alysse Gafkjen – photography
- Carrie Smith – design
- Sami Wideberg – cover artwork
- Jess Nolan – backing vocals
- Ross McReynolds – drums, percussion
- Calvin Knowles – electric bass
- Johnny Williamson – electric guitar
- Jedd Hughes – electric guitar
- Zachariah Witcher – electric bass
- Luke Enyeart – electric guitar
- Hank Born – electric guitar
- Ian Miller – piano, Rhodes, synthesizer, organ, additional keyboards, bells, Mellotron
- David Crutcher – piano, Rhodes, organ
- Eric Darken – vibraphone, bells, additional percussion
- Alicia Enstrom – violin
- Laura Epling – violin
- Kristin Weber – violin
- Jake Tudor – viola
- Betsy Lamb – viola
- Maggie Chaffee – cello
- Austin Hoke – cello
- Jordan Lehning – string arrangement on "It's Always Been You"
- Jake Ohlbaum – background vocals

== See also ==
- List of 2020 albums
