= Vera Sola =

American musician

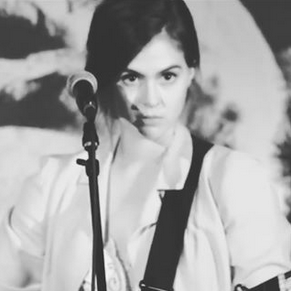
- Sola in 2017

Background information
- Born: Danielle Aykroyd; November 18, 1989 (age 36); Los Angeles, California, U.S.
- Genres: Folk; indie folk; country
- Occupations: Singer-songwriter; multi-instrumentalist; poet; actress
- Instruments: Vocals; guitar; bass; autoharp; keyboards
- Years active: 1991–present
- Labels: Spectraphonic; City Slang
- Website: verasola.com

Danielle Aykroyd (born November 18, 1989), known professionally as Vera Sola, is an American singer-songwriter, multi-instrumentalist, and recording artist. She studied poetry under Jorie Graham at Harvard University. She performed, produced, and arranged everything on her debut album Shades, which was self-released on November 9, 2018.

== Biography ==
Vera Sola was born Danielle Aykroyd to actor Dan Aykroyd and actress Donna Dixon, on November 18, 1989, in Los Angeles, California. She graduated from Saint Ann's School and then from Harvard University with a bachelor's degree in literature. After college, she worked on the radio and as a voice actor. She still does commercial voice-overs and narration for television and film.

Sola is reticent about her family, and distanced herself from her recognizable name to establish a career in music on her own. She has said that, though she is proud of her lineage, she never liked her name much. The stage name came about as what she calls a "pretentious, sort of scathing inside joke with myself, albeit with a silver lining of sincerity."

== Music career ==
Sola did not consider taking up music seriously until a longtime friend, songwriter Elvis Perkins, encouraged her to join his touring band. She toured and recorded with Perkins throughout and after his I Aubade album cycle, and credits him with bringing her onstage. She still plays bass guitar and other instruments in his band.

In February 2017, after a series of life-changing events, Sola decided to pursue a solo career. She entered the studio to record Shades, and took the name Vera Sola shortly after. She performed, arranged, and produced the album independently, telling Flood Magazine of the process: “it's the direct result of my reality, personal and global, going up in a dark and disorienting and sad and often very funny blaze...When I finally talked myself into making it, I thought I’d have friends come in and contribute, but the nature of things drew me ultimately towards playing and arranging it all. So...it’s an unbroken vessel of my own energy, for better or worse. It was pure expression without expectation. I never even planned to release it. But here we are.”

In October 2017, she released Last Caress, an EP of Misfits covers that attracted the attention of industry professionals.

The first single from Shades was self-released through her Spectraphonic label in August 2018, which released the album on November 9, 2018. On it, she plays a number of unconventional instruments, including bones, chains and breaking glass.

Music blog The Line of Best Fit gave the album a 9/10, writing: "Such is the virtuosity and accomplishment of her playing, Shades is bound with the tight-knit swagger of a group of road wearied sessions players. It’s hard to believe it is the work of just one person." The Sunday Times called her "an undeniably singular talent" and called 'Shades' an essential new release.

French Music magazine Magic gave it a 6/6 and named it the number 2 record of the year calling it an "absolute masterpiece".

In November 2018, Rolling Stone Magazine named her one of "The Top Ten Country Artists You Need to Know", citing her sense of social conscience and comparing her voice to Nancy Sinatra.

== Live performance ==
Sola's stage presence has been called hypnotic, "captivating; almost hallucinatory". Her 2018 performance at the Le Guess Who? festival in the Netherlands received rave reviews. Greek blog ClockSound wrote: "Her personal, theatrical and modern take on Americana and turn of the century (20s, not 21s) music has me hooked from the moment I walked into the Hertz...Her lyricism and the influence poetry have had on this strongly reminds me of—and this is coming from a very big fan—Leonard Cohen."

A live-performance review in Loud and Quiet magazine calls her "a Westworld android gone rogue; a living anachronism, capable of both run-of-the-mill stage banter and of occupying the characters of her songs with full force, moving as if possessed by them as she performs."

Sola has performed with many different musicians and instruments. She usually plays the guitar, with a unique finger-picking style.

She toured the United States opening for Sixto Rodriguez, subject of the Academy Award-winning documentary Searching for Sugar Man.

Sola performed at the Bombay Beach Biennale in 2019, a three-day festival of art, music, and lectures in the Southern California desert.

== Discography ==
Studio albums

- Shades (2018)
- Peacemaker (2024)
- Ghostmaker (2024 EP)

== Filmography ==
Film performances
Year	Title	Role
1991	Nothing but Trouble	porch person
1993	Coneheads	3-year-old Connie
