= Peacemaker (Vera Sola album) =

Studio album by Vera Sola
- Released: February 2, 2024
- Length: 44:18
- Label: Spectraphonic; City Slang
- Producer: Vera Sola

Vera Sola chronology
Shades (2018)	Peacemaker (2024)

Peacemaker is the second studio album by American singer-songwriter Vera Sola, released on February 2, 2024, through Spectraphonic Records and City Slang. It was produced by Sola and co-produced by Kenneth Pattengale, and received acclaim from critics.

== Critical reception ==
Professional ratings
Aggregate scores
Source	Rating
Metacritic	80/100
Review scores
Source	Rating
Clash	8/10
Exclaim!	7/10
Mojo	4/5 stars
Uncut	7/10
The Line of Best Fit	8/10

Peacemaker received a score of 80 out of 100 on review aggregator Metacritic based on seven critics' reviews, indicating "generally favorable" reception. Mojo stated that "there's a full band, a string section Swarmatron and brass. Reassuringly, the songs are strong enough to carry the new load". Uncut felt that "Sola can be detached but is at her best when she leans into the songs".

Exclaim!'s Jordan Currie opined that Sola and Pattengale's intention of "introduc[ing] richer sounds and textures" results in "rock, blues, country and folk mingl[ing] with dramatic orchestral flares, always guided by Sola's powerful alto", calling it "clear that Peacemaker is a labour of love". Craig Howieson of Clash wrote that "the fuller orchestration matches the grandeur of her voice well" and "through an exploration of war, bloodspill, loss and confusion Vera Sola has continued to tell her story, and invite us into her arresting world". John Amen of The Line of Best Fit gave the album a score of 8/10, noting that "Sola concludes Peacemaker much as she launches it, striking a sublime balance between pop know-how and theatrical flair."

== Track listing ==
All lyrics are written by Vera Sola; all music is composed by Vera Sola except "Bad Idea" and "Desire Path", composed with Kenneth Pattengale.

Peacemaker track listing
No.	Title	Length
1.	"Bad Idea"	2:59
2.	"The Line"	3:52
3.	"I'm Lying"	5:26
4.	"Get Wise"	3:29
5.	"Desire Path"	4:42
6.	"Waiting"	2:35
7.	"Bird House"	4:06
8.	"Hands"	3:51
9.	"Is That You?"	4:42
10.	"Blood Bond"	4:50
11.	"Instrument of War"	3:46
Total length:		44:18

== Personnel ==
- Vera Sola – lead vocals, production, mixing
- Kenneth Pattengale – co-production, mixing
- Dave Kutch – mastering
- Matt Ross-Spang – mixing on all tracks except "Instrument of War"
- Ebru Yildiz – cover photo
- Daniel Murphy – graphic design
- Whyndam Garnett – photography
