= N.H.I.E. =

2024 single by 21 Savage and Doja Cat

Single by 21 Savage and Doja Cat

from the album American Dream
- Released: January 17, 2024
- Genre: Hip hop
- Length: 2:23
- Label: Epic; Slaughter Gang
- Songwriters: Shéyaa Abraham-Joseph; Amala Dlamini; Kurtis McKenzie; Michael Orabiyi; Anthony Jefferies; Douglas Ford; Jonah Stevens
- Producers: Kurtis McKenzie; Scribz Riley; Jonah

21 Savage singles chronology
| "Call Me Revenge" (2024) | "N.H.I.E." / "Redrum" (2024) | "Née-Nah" (2024) |

Doja Cat singles chronology
| "Agora Hills" (2023) | "N.H.I.E." (2024) | "Okloser" (2024) |

"N.H.I.E." is a song by British-American rapper 21 Savage and American rapper and singer Doja Cat on the former's third studio album, American Dream (2024). Originally intended for the latter's album Scarlet (2023). It was sent to US rhythmic radio through Slaughter Gang and Epic Records as the second single from the album. The record was produced by Kurtis McKenzie, Scribz Riley, and Jonah Stevens. "N.H.I.E." stands for "never have I ever".

== Composition ==
Teejay Small for HotNewHipHop wrote that "Doja Cat stuns with her trademark blend of melody and humor", while Mosi Reeves for Rolling Stone praised Doja Cat's "whispery adlibs".

== Critical reception ==
Writing for Clash, Robin Murray stated that "Doja Cat provides balance" on the record.

== Charts ==
Chart performance for "N.H.I.E."
| Chart (2024) | Peak position |
|---|---|
| Australia (ARIA) | 51 |
| Australia Hip Hop/R&B (ARIA) | 11 |
| Canada Hot 100 (Billboard) | 15 |
| France (SNEP) | 95 |
| Global 200 (Billboard) | 19 |
| Ireland (IRMA) | 39 |
| Latvia (LAIPA) | 8 |
| Lithuania (AGATA) | 13 |
| Netherlands (Single Top 100) | 86 |
| New Zealand (Recorded Music NZ) | 37 |
| Poland (Polish Streaming Top 100) | 52 |
| Portugal (AFP) | 60 |
| Slovakia Singles Digital (ČNS IFPI) | 37 |
| South Africa (TOSAC) | 13 |
| Sweden Heatseeker (Sverigetopplistan) | 11 |
| Switzerland (Schweizer Hitparade) | 29 |
| UK Singles (OCC) | 27 |
| UK Hip Hop/R&B (OCC) | 10 |
| US Billboard Hot 100 | 19 |
| US Hot R&B/Hip-Hop Songs (Billboard) | 9 |

== Certifications ==
Certifications for "N.H.I.E."
| Region | Certification | Certified units/sales |
|---|---|---|
| Brazil (Pro-Música Brasil) | Gold | 20,000^{‡} |
| Canada (Music Canada) | Gold | 40,000^{‡} |
| United States (RIAA) | Gold | 500,000^{‡} |
^{‡} Sales+streaming figures based on certification alone.

== Release history ==
Release history for "N.H.I.E."
| Region | Date | Format | Label | Ref. |
|---|---|---|---|---|
| Italy | January 17, 2024 | Contemporary hit radio | Sony | |
