= Hole in My Head =

Studio album by Laura Jane Grace
- Released: February 16, 2024
- Recorded: February 2023
- Studio: Native Sound (St. Louis, Missouri, US)
- Genre: Punk rock; folk punk
- Length: 25:28
- Label: Polyvinyl
- Producer: Laura Jane Grace

Laura Jane Grace chronology
At War with the Silverfish (2021)	Hole in My Head (2024)	Give an Inch (2024)

Hole in My Head is the second solo studio album by American singer-songwriter Laura Jane Grace, released on February 16, 2024, through Polyvinyl Record Co. It received acclaim from critics.

== Background and recording ==
The album was written by Grace, while on tour. Grace played guitar and drums, accompanied by Drive-By Truckers bassist Matt Patton.

== Critical reception ==
Professional ratings
Aggregate scores
Source	Rating
Metacritic	80/100
Review scores
Source	Rating
AllMusic	3.5/5 stars
DIY	4/5 stars
Exclaim!	7/10
Kerrang!	4/5
Pitchfork	7.3/10

Hole in My Head received a score of 80 out of 100 on review aggregator Metacritic based on six critics' reviews, indicating "generally favorable" reception. Glide Magazine's John Moore called it "a brilliant mix of humor, spite and self-preservation" as well as "a stylistically elastic record that covers folk, pop and rock all filtered through the experiences of a lifelong punk rocker". AllMusic's Stephen Thomas Erlewine found that it "isn't quite so urgent" as Stay Alive (2020) "yet it feels of a piece with its predecessor, coming from a similar place of confusion", calling it "a lean, nervy rock album that uses its mess and its contradictions to its own advantage".

DIY's Ben Tipple stated that there is "something inherently welcoming in the short, sharp, and lyrically open songs" as "each track unfolds with an ease only reserved for somebody with so much skin in the game". Reviewing the album for Exclaim!, Anthony Boire called it "an open invitation to a wild romp through Grace's psyche" on which "Grace is still giving it her all". James Hickie of Kerrang! found Hole in My Head to be "evocative stuff" as well as "a characteristically brisk affair, with its 11 tracks clocking in at just 25 minutes, but overflowing with ideas, insights and the odd barb". Annie Howard of Pitchfork characterized the album as "playfully retro punk songs" on which Grace "weaves through the stripped-down style [she] explored on 2020's Stay Alive and louder songs more akin to her work with Against Me!".

== Track listing ==
All tracks are written by Laura Jane Grace.

Hole in My Head track listing
No.	Title	Length
1.	"Hole in My Head"	1:41
2.	"I'm Not a Cop"	2:22
3.	"Dysphoria Hoodie"	2:34
4.	"Birds Talk Too"	1:57
5.	"Punk Rock in Basements"	2:09
6.	"Cuffing Season"	2:26
7.	"Tacos and Toast"	2:25
8.	"Mercenary"	2:27
9.	"Keep Your Wheels Straight"	2:38
10.	"Hard Feelings"	2:12
11.	"Give Up the Ghost"	2:37
Total length:		25:28

== Personnel ==
- Laura Jane Grace – vocals, guitar, drums, production
- Collin Jordan – mastering
- Matt Allison – mixing
- David Beeman – engineering
- Dave Decker – cover photo
- Annie Walter – artwork
- Matt Patton – bass guitar, backing vocals (tracks 1, 2, 4, 5, 8, 9)

== Charts ==
Chart performance for Hole in My Head
Chart (2024)	Peak position
Scottish Albums (OCC)	63
UK Independent Albums (OCC)	32
