= Redrum (21 Savage song) =

2024 single by 21 Savage

Single by 21 Savage

from the album American Dream
- Released: January 12, 2024
- Recorded: 2023
- Genre: Trap
- Length: 4:30
- Label: Slaughter Gang; Epic
- Songwriters: Shéyaa Abraham-Joseph; London Holmes
- Producer: London on da Track

21 Savage singles chronology
"Call Me Revenge" (2023)	"Redrum" / "N.H.I.E." (2024)	"Née-Nah" (2024)

Music video
- "Redrum" on YouTube

"Redrum" is a song by British rapper 21 Savage from his third studio album, American Dream (2024). The record was produced and co-written by London on da Track and samples vocals from Brazilian singer, Elza Laranjeira's "Serenata do Adeus". The song title is also a reference to the Stanley Kubrick film The Shining, which is based on the novel by Stephen King of the same name. American singer-songwriter Usher is credited for additional vocals in the outro of the song where he recites the taunt from The Three Little Pigs followed by the iconic "Here's Johnny!" line from the aforementioned film.

== Composition ==
Matthew Ritchie for Pitchfork described the track to have "drawn-out distribution of his murderous wordplay" that "makes it feel as though he’s almost veering off the tracks". Rolling Stone's Mosi Reeves described the song as "murderous", noting that it "leans on" Elza Laranjeira's "Serenata Do Adeus".

== Critical reception ==
Robin Murray for Clash noted that the song "spotlight[s] his effortless trap-leaning flows". The song is described as having "slightly terrifying vibes, violent lyrics, a catchy hook, and a bunch of fun flows".

== Music video ==
The Danny Seth-directed music video was recorded in 21 Savage's city of birth, London. Beginning the video by showing stereotypical locations in London like the Big Ben, the London Eye, and the iconic Red telephone boxes before switching the setting to Brixton, a working-class district in South London, to show viewers who criticized him for being British-born the 'real' London.

== Personnel ==
=== Musicians ===
- Shéyaa Abraham-Joseph – lead artist, production, vocals, songwriter, composer
- London Holmes – production, songwriter, composer
- AyoPeeb (mateen kyle niknam) – production, songwriter, composer
- Usher – additional vocals

=== Technical ===
- Isaiah Brown – recording
- Mike Bozzi – mastering
- Miles Walker – mixing
- Shawn Pedan – assistant engineer

== Charts ==
=== Weekly charts ===
Weekly chart performance for "Redrum"
Chart (2024)	Peak position
Australia (ARIA)	16
Australia Hip Hop/R&B (ARIA)	4
Austria (Ö3 Austria Top 40)	20
Canada Hot 100 (Billboard)	7
Czech Republic Singles Digital (ČNS IFPI)	32
Finland (Suomen virallinen lista)	44
France (SNEP)	88
Germany (GfK)	51
Greece International (IFPI)	1
Global 200 (Billboard)	5
Hungary (Single Top 40)	21
Ireland (IRMA)	15
Israel (Mako Hitlist)	55
Italy (FIMI)	66
Latvia Streaming (LaIPA)	1
Lithuania (AGATA)	2
Luxembourg (Billboard)	13
MENA (IFPI)	12
Netherlands (Single Top 100)	40
Netherlands (Tipparade)	6
New Zealand (Recorded Music NZ)	11
Norway (VG-lista)	24
Poland (Polish Streaming Top 100)	23
Portugal (AFP)	7
Romania (Billboard)	15
Singapore (RIAS)	27
Slovakia Singles Digital (ČNS IFPI)	7
South Africa Streaming (TOSAC)	8
Sweden (Sverigetopplistan)	47
Switzerland (Schweizer Hitparade)	7
UAE (IFPI)	3
UK Singles (Official Charts)	11
UK Hip Hop/R&B (Official Charts)	3
US Billboard Hot 100	5
US Hot R&B/Hip-Hop Songs (Billboard)	2
US Pop Airplay (Billboard)	36
US Rhythmic Airplay (Billboard)	1

=== Year-end charts ===
Year-end chart performance for "Redrum"
Chart (2024)	Position
Australia Hip Hop/R&B (ARIA)	19
Canada (Canadian Hot 100)	46
Global 200 (Billboard)	102
US Billboard Hot 100	42
US Hot R&B/Hip-Hop Songs (Billboard)	11
US Rhythmic (Billboard)	18

== Certifications ==
Certifications for "Redrum"
Region	Certification	Certified units/sales
Australia (ARIA)	Platinum	70,000^{‡}
Austria (IFPI Austria)	Gold	15,000^{‡}
Brazil (Pro-Música Brasil)	2× Platinum	80,000^{‡}
Canada (Music Canada)	3× Platinum	240,000^{‡}
Hungary (MAHASZ)	2× Platinum	8,000^{‡}
Mexico (AMPROFON)	Platinum	140,000^{‡}
New Zealand (RMNZ)	Platinum	30,000^{‡}
Poland (ZPAV)	Platinum	50,000^{‡}
Portugal (AFP)	Gold	5,000^{‡}
Switzerland (IFPI Switzerland)	Gold	15,000^{‡}
United Kingdom (BPI)	Gold	400,000^{‡}
United States (RIAA)	3× Platinum	3,000,000^{‡}
Streaming
Central America (CFC)	Gold	3,500,000^{†}
Greece (IFPI Greece)	Platinum	2,000,000^{†}
^{‡} Sales+streaming figures based on certification alone.^{†} Streaming-only figures based on certification alone.

== Release history ==
Release history for "Redrum"
Region	Date	Format	Label	Ref.
Italy	January 17, 2024	Contemporary hit radio	Sony	
