= American Dream (21 Savage album) =

Studio album by 21 Savage
- Released: January 12, 2024
- Recorded: 2022–2023
- Genres: Hip-hop; trap
- Length: 49:49
- Labels: Slaughter Gang; Epic
- Producers: Allen Ritter; BoogzDaBeast; Cardo; Coupe; Dpat; FnZ; g06beatz; Honorable C.N.O.T.E.; ibmixing; Isaiah Brown; Johnny Juliano; Jonah Stevens; Jonas Lee; Kid Hazel; Kurtis McKenzie; KXVI; Lil Tyh; London on da Track; Metro Boomin; OG Parker; Scribz Riley; Smash David; Spiff Sinatra

21 Savage chronology
| Her Loss (2022) | American Dream (2024) | What Happened to the Streets? (2025) |

Singles from American Dream
- 1. "Redrum" Released: January 6, 2024; 2. "N.H.I.E" Released: January 17, 2024; 3. "Née-Nah" Released: January 23, 2024; 4. "Prove It" Released: June 4, 2024

American Dream (stylized in lowercase) is the third album by the rapper 21 Savage. It was released through Slaughter Gang Entertainment and Epic Records on January 12, 2024. The album contains guest appearances from Doja Cat, Young Thug, Metro Boomin, Lil Durk, Travis Scott, Summer Walker, Brent Faiyaz, Burna Boy, Tommy Newport, Mikky Ekko, and Mariah the Scientist. Production was handled by Metro Boomin himself, London on da Track, Scribz Riley, Allen Ritter, OG Parker, Cardo, FnZ, and Honorable C.N.O.T.E., among others.

== Background and promotion ==
In July 2023, Savage embarked on a concert tour with Canadian rapper and singer Drake, named the It's All a Blur Tour, during which the latter stated that both him and Savage were working on their respective solo studio albums. On August 7, Savage took to Twitter to state that "it's time", seemingly teasing the album. After embarking on a solo headlining tour in November 2023, Savage headlined his first show in London, England, at the O2 Arena, where he stated that his "album finna drop" and told his fans to "get ready". In December 2023, billboards and banners began to appear, further adding to the promotion of the album and further building its anticipation.

On January 8, 2024, Savage announced that a biopic film about himself titled American Dream: The 21 Savage Story, starring himself along with Donald Glover and Caleb McLaughlin, would be released on July 4. On the same day, Savage posted the film's trailer on his official YouTube channel, previewing a track from the album in the process, and announced that the music inspired by the film was available for pre-order. Just a day later, on January 9, Savage took to his social media to post the album's official cover art and announced that it would be released three days later. On January 9, Savage began to tease the guest artists on the album after posting baby pictures of fellow American rapper Young Thug and American singers Summer Walker and Brent Faiyaz. The following day, he posted baby pictures of fellow American rappers Lil Durk and Travis Scott and American singer Mariah the Scientist. On January 11, Savage posted baby pictures of Nigerian singer Burna Boy, American record producer Metro Boomin, and fellow American rapper and singer Doja Cat. Despite not releasing an official album tracklist prior to the album's release as per usual, the project was released smoothly and on time. On January 24, 2024, in an interview with Shannon Sharpe on Club Shay Shay, Savage disclosed that his biopic, American Dream: The 21 Savage Story, was a parody made to promote the release of his album.

=== Singles ===
The dual lead singles of the album, "Redrum" and "N.H.I.E.", the latter being a collaboration with Doja Cat, were sent to Italian contemporary hit radio on January 17, 2024. Five days earlier, the official music video for the former was also released alongside the album. The second single, "Née-Nah", a collaboration with Travis Scott and Metro Boomin, was sent to US rhythmic radio on January 23, 2024. The third and final single, "Prove It", a collaboration with Summer Walker, was sent to US rhythmic radio on June 4, 2024.

== Critical reception ==
Professional ratings
Aggregate scores
| Source | Rating |
|---|---|
| Metacritic | 73/100 |
Review scores
| Source | Rating |
| AllMusic | 3.5/5 stars |
| Clash | 8/10 |
| HipHopDX | 3.5/5 |
| Pitchfork | 6.8/10 |

American Dream received generally positive reviews. The album had a score of 73 out of 100 on review aggregator Metacritic based on five critics' reviews, indicating "generally favorable" reception. Writing for Clash, Robin Murray began his review by noting that the album "allows 21 Savage space to tell his story". Breaking down the halves of the album, he continued to write that "the first half of the record leans on his rap flair, while the second indulges his softer, R&B inclinations". Concluding his review, Murray wrote that "American Dream is 21 Savage at his most luminescent" and that he is "staying true to himself" as "he's been able to build something unique". Writing for HipHopDX, Will Schube wrote that "American Dream is 21 Savage at his most deeply intimate, treating the recording booth like a diary, examining his life and career from a 30,000 foot view". He noted that "Savage isn't bitter on his latest offering, but he knows his worth; his family has worked too long and too hard for him to slip up or be taken advantage of" and that "he's stuck between trying to be good, trying to honor the effort and sacrifices his mother made, and being drawn back to his crew, back to the deals and the cash and everything that came with it", noting that "humanity is what makes this record succeed".

Matthew Ritchie for Pitchfork noted that 21 Savage's "third solo album attempts to balance reveling in his newfound elevated celebrity and retaining the tortured persona that relishes in recounting the gruesome details of his journey" and that he "cuts through the glossy excess with clarity and lyrical self-assuredness, producing enough sterling moments to show that he's still a star worthy of fanfare". Ritchie praised the album's production, stating that the "overall cohesion of the production is a welcome sign" while also noting that "his effectiveness stems from minute tweaks, mutating his low register and delivery to imbue emotion and variance into his stone-faced raps". Writing for Vibe, Grant Rindner stated that the album "serves as a very broad framing for the album, particularly in opening and closing spoken interludes from his mother". Rindner noted that "21's strongest rap skills, his caustic sense of humor and deadpan delivery, are fully intact on American Dream" before praising his beat selection as he wrote that he "has one of the best ears for beats in modern hip-hop, and his noted chemistry with Metro Boomin is present".

Rolling Stone's Mosi Reeves wrote that on the album, sometimes, "the production flags or his choruses don't quite hit their marks", however, "he's still capable of giving you what you've come to expect". In comparison to Her Loss, Reeves stated that "American Dream is garlanded with dreamily rendered samples, a technique used to much better effect here than Her Loss". Writing for HotNewHipHop, Teejay Small wrote that "the album lacks a cohesive through-line that thematically ties the material back to the premise promised by the title and imagery" and that "the overall aesthetic of American Dream may lead listeners to assume that the project is a meditation on the state of poverty or immigration in 21's life".

== Commercial performance ==
American Dream debuted at number one on the US Billboard 200 with 133,000 album-equivalent units, including 4,500 pure album sales, replacing Morgan Wallen's One Thing at a Time (2023) from the top spot. American Dream earned a total of 169.53 million on-demand streams. The album is 21 Savage's fourth consecutive number-one album in the US. Fourteen tracks debuted on the Billboard Hot 100, with two of them in the top 10: "Redrum" (at No. 5) and "Née-Nah" (at No. 10) respectively. The intro, "American Dream" was deemed too short to debut on the charts. Savage also became the first artist of 2024 and the sixteenth artist overall to chart at least 100 songs on the Billboard Hot 100. In the second week American Dream remained at the top of the Billboard 200, moving an additional 78,000 units.

The album broke a record in rap music as American Dream debuted with the most first-week streams for a trap album in history. In addition to breaking a music record, American Dream debuted at number one on album charts in at least 7 countries including Australia, Canada, Lithuania, and New Zealand. The album debuted at number 2 on the UK Albums Chart and the Irish Albums Chart while debuting at number 5 and 8 on the French Albums Chart and the Finnish Album Charts.

== Track listing ==
American Dream track listing
| No. | Title | Writer(s) | Producer(s) | Length |
|---|---|---|---|---|
| 1. | "American Dream" | Ruben Bailey; Sterling White; Isaiah Brown; Billie Calvin | Spiff Sinatra; IBMixing | 1:03 |
| 2. | "All of Me" | Shéyaa Abraham-Joseph; White; Raphael Oliveira; Khaya Gilika; Yakki Davis; Jalen Jackson; Jared Brown; Calvin | Spiff Sinatra | 3:18 |
| 3. | "Redrum" | Abraham-Joseph; London Holmes; Mateen Niknam; Vinícius de Moraes | London on da Track; AyoPeeb^{[a]} | 4:30 |
| 4. | "N.H.I.E." (with Doja Cat) | Abraham-Joseph; Amala Dlamini; Anthony Jefferies; Douglas Ford; Kurtis McKenzie; Michael Orabiyi; Jonah Stevens | McKenzie; Scribz Riley; Jonah | 2:23 |
| 5. | "Sneaky" | Abraham-Joseph; Edward Cooper III | Coupe | 3:21 |
| 6. | "Pop Ur Shit" (with Young Thug and Metro Boomin) | Abraham-Joseph; Jeffery Williams; Leland Wayne; Allen Ritter | Metro Boomin; Ritter | 3:13 |
| 7. | "Letter to My Brudda" | Abraham-Joseph; Paola Amado; Tchakalla Romeo; William Boyette; Kavi Iybarger; Park Min Geon; Tyrese McGriff | Kxvi; G06beatz; Lil Tyh | 2:39 |
| 8. | "Dangerous" (with Lil Durk and Metro Boomin) | Abraham-Joseph; Durk Banks; Wayne; Jahshua Brown; Jahmal Gwin | Metro Boomin; BoogzDaBeast; Cashmere Brown^{[a]} | 4:25 |
| 9. | "Née-Nah" (with Travis Scott and Metro Boomin) | Abraham-Joseph; Jacques Webster II; Wayne; Ford | Metro Boomin | 3:40 |
| 10. | "See the Real" | Abraham-Joseph; Jocelyn Donald; Jordan Holt-May; Joshua Parker; Samuel Jiménez; Dylan Cleary-Krell; Jason Cornet | OG Parker; Smash David; Dez Wright; TenRoc | 3:02 |
| 11. | "Prove It" (with Summer Walker) | Abraham-Joseph; Summer Walker; Keith Thomas; Tauren Stovall; Brown; Cooper; Tye Gibson; Faith Evans; Carl Thompson | IBMixing; Coupe; Tye Beats | 3:27 |
| 12. | "Should've Wore a Bonnet" (with Brent Faiyaz) | Abraham-Joseph; Christopher Wood; Ronald LaTour; David Patino; John Julian; Francis Esteban; Donald De Grate; Joel Hailey; Darryl Pearson | Cardo; Dpat; Johnny Juliano; Esta | 3:06 |
| 13. | "Just Like Me" (with Burna Boy and Metro Boomin) | Abraham-Joseph; Damini Ogulu; Wayne; Michael Mulé; Isaac De Boni; Gwin; Kira Huszar; Khadijah Lopez; Akeel Henry; Jordon Manswell; Nevon Sinclair; Kevin Ekofo | Metro Boomin; FnZ; BoogzDaBeast | 3:51 |
| 14. | "Red Sky" (with Mikky Ekko and Tommy Newport) | Abraham-Joseph; Tommy Newport; Adam Farag; Carlton Mays Jr.; Courtney Dwight | Honorable C.N.O.T.E.; Blaqsmurph^{[a]} | 2:56 |
| 15. | "Dark Days" (with Mariah the Scientist) | Abraham-Joseph; Mariah Buckles; Atia Boggs; Amado; Ahmar Bailey; Jonas Lee; Iybarger; Yousef Sameh; Davis | Kid Hazel; Lee; Kxvi; Sameh | 4:55 |
| Total length: | | | | 49:49 |

Notes

- ^{^[a]} signifies a co-producer
- All tracks are stylized in all lowercase

Sample credits

- "All of Me" contains a sample of "Wishing on a Star", written by Billie Rae Calvin, as performed by Rose Royce.
- "Redrum" contains a sample of "Serenata do adeus", written by Vinicius de Moraes, as performed by Elza Laranjeira; as well as samples from the "Here's Johnny!" scene from The Shining; and interpolations of "A Lot", written by Shéyaa Abraham-Joseph, Jermaine Cole, Dacoury Natche, Anthony White and Shelia Young, as performed by 21 Savage and J. Cole.
- "Dangerous" contains samples of "To Yasmina", written by Bernard Lubat, as performed by Bernard Lubat And His Mad Ducks.
- "Née-Nah" contains samples of "About Her" written by Malcolm McLaren, Rod Argent, and W. C. Handy, as performed by McLaren; and "'Cause I Love You", written by Leonard Williams and Frank Wilson, as performed by Lenny Williams.
- "Prove It" contains a sample of "You Are My Joy", written and performed by Faith Evans.
- "Should've Wore a Bonnet" contains a sample of "I Don't Want to Do Anything", written by DeVante Swing, as performed by Mary J. Blige and K-Ci; and interpolations from an unreleased song, "Hair", written by Durk Banks and Symere Woods, as performed by Lil Durk and Lil Uzi Vert.
- "Just Like Me" contains a sample of "Raw", written by Kira Huszar, as performed by Loony.
- "Red Sky" contains a sample of the full-length version of "Summer Night City", written by Benny Anderson and Bjorn Ulvaeus, as performed by Abba.

== Personnel ==
Musicians

- 21 Savage – vocals
- Heather Carmillia Joseph – additional vocals (1, 15)
- Spiff Sinatra – keyboards (1, 2), drums (1, 2)
- James Owens Jr. – keyboards (1)
- Isaiah Brown – keyboards (1), strings (1)
- Rose Royce – additional vocals (2)
- Noc – drums (2)
- Jalen Jackson – keyboards (2)
- Usher – additional vocals (3)
- Nineteen85 – keyboards (4)
- Peter Lee Johnson – strings (6)
- 21 Lil Harold – additional vocals (7, 8)
- Paola Barba – additional vocals (7)
- Higher Learning – choir (13)
- Ink – additional vocals (15)

Technical

- Mike Bozzi – mastering
- Miles Walker – mixing (1–5, 12, 15)
- Isaiah Brown – mixing (5, 11), recording (1–5, 7–15), engineering assistance (1)
- Ethan Stevens – mixing (6, 8, 9, 13), recording (6, 8, 9, 13)
- Alex Tumay – mixing (7, 10, 14)
- Patrizio "Teezio" Pigliapoco – mixing (10)
- David "Dos Dias" Bishop – mixing (11), recording (11)
- William "Bilz" Dougan – recording (13)
- Natalie D'Orlando – recording (15)
- Spiff Santra – engineering assistance (1)
- Jared Brown – engineering assistance (2)
- Shawn Peden – engineering assistance (2–5, 7, 8)
- Khaya "Macxsn" Gilika – engineering assistance (2)

== Charts ==
=== Weekly charts ===
Weekly chart performance for American Dream
| Chart (2024) | Peak position |
|---|---|
| Australian Albums (ARIA) | 1 |
| Australian Hip Hop/R&B Albums (ARIA) | 1 |
| Austrian Albums (Ö3 Austria) | 2 |
| Belgian Albums (Ultratop Flanders) | 3 |
| Belgian Albums (Ultratop Wallonia) | 3 |
| Canadian Albums (Billboard) | 1 |
| Czech Albums (ČNS IFPI) | 3 |
| Danish Albums (Hitlisten) | 2 |
| Dutch Albums (Album Top 100) | 2 |
| Finnish Albums (Suomen virallinen lista) | 8 |
| French Albums (SNEP) | 5 |
| German Albums (Offizielle Top 100) | 4 |
| Hungarian Albums (MAHASZ) | 2 |
| Icelandic Albums (Tónlistinn) | 2 |
| Irish Albums (Official Charts) | 2 |
| Italian Albums (FIMI) | 7 |
| Lithuanian Albums (AGATA) | 1 |
| New Zealand Albums (RMNZ) | 1 |
| Norwegian Albums (VG-lista) | 1 |
| Polish Albums (ZPAV) | 4 |
| Portuguese Albums (AFP) | 1 |
| Slovak Albums (ČNS IFPI) | 2 |
| Spanish Albums (Promusicae) | 23 |
| Swedish Albums (Sverigetopplistan) | 4 |
| Swiss Albums (Schweizer Hitparade) | 1 |
| UK Albums (Official Charts) | 2 |
| UK R&B Albums (Official Charts) | 6 |
| US Billboard 200 | 1 |
| US Top R&B/Hip-Hop Albums (Billboard) | 1 |

=== Year-end charts ===
Year-end chart performance for American Dream
| Chart (2024) | Position |
|---|---|
| Australian Albums (ARIA) | 82 |
| Australian Hip Hop/R&B Albums (ARIA) | 22 |
| Belgian Albums (Ultratop Flanders) | 168 |
| Canadian Albums (Billboard) | 49 |
| Hungarian Albums (MAHASZ) | 48 |
| Icelandic Albums (Tónlistinn) | 50 |
| New Zealand Albums (RMNZ) | 29 |
| Polish Albums (ZPAV) | 88 |
| Swiss Albums (Schweizer Hitparade) | 53 |
| US Billboard 200 | 36 |
| US Top R&B/Hip-Hop Albums (Billboard) | 9 |

== Certifications ==
Certifications for American Dream
| Region | Certification | Certified units/sales |
|---|---|---|
| Brazil (Pro-Música Brasil) | Gold | 20,000^{‡} |
| Canada (Music Canada) | Platinum | 80,000^{‡} |
| Hungary (MAHASZ) | Gold | 2,000^{‡} |
| Italy (FIMI) | Gold | 25,000^{‡} |
| New Zealand (RMNZ) | Platinum | 15,000^{‡} |
| Poland (ZPAV) | Gold | 10,000^{‡} |
| United Kingdom (BPI) | Silver | 60,000^{‡} |
| United States (RIAA) | Platinum | 1,000,000^{‡} |
^{‡} Sales+streaming figures based on certification alone.
