= Five Dice, All Threes =

Studio album by Bright Eyes
- Released: September 20, 2024
- Recorded: September 2023–February 2024
- Studio: ARC (Omaha)
- Length: 50:54
- Label: Dead Oceans
- Producer: Bright Eyes

Bright Eyes chronology
| Down in the Weeds, Where the World Once Was (2020) | Five Dice, All Threes (2024) | Kids Table (2025) |

Singles from Five Dice, All Threes
- 1. "Bells and Whistles" Released: June 25, 2024; 2. "Rainbow Overpass" Released: August 6, 2024

Five Dice, All Threes is the eleventh studio album by American band Bright Eyes, released by Dead Oceans on September 20, 2024. The album features collaborations with Alex Orange Drink, Cat Power and Matt Berninger. It was supported by two singles: "Bells and Whistles" and "Rainbow Overpass".

== Background ==
The album was recorded by Mike Mogis at ARC Studios in Omaha, Nebraska, from September 2023 to February 2024.

Regarding the album's dice-themed framing device, Oberst stated: "Life is a game of chance and a metaphorical street brawl, so that is what we are putting out there."

== Release and tour ==
In an October 2023 interview with Mixdown Magazine, Conor Oberst revealed that Bright Eyes were recording a new record which he anticipated would be released the following fall. On June 18, 2024, the band confirmed on Instagram that they would be releasing their eleventh studio album sometime in the fall.

Five Dice, All Threes was officially announced on June 25 alongside the single "Bells and Whistles" and its accompanying music video, which was directed by Josh Boone. They simultaneously announced 15 tour dates, which would begin with a release show at Brooklyn Steel in New York on September 19 and later move to Europe for a nine-date run in November. On August 6, the band released a second single, "Rainbow Overpass", and announced a 43-date North American tour spanning the first four months of 2025. It is set to begin on January 16 in Phoenix, Arizona, and end on April 26 in Des Moines, Iowa. Five Dice, All Threes was released by Dead Oceans on September 20, 2024. It is the second of a two-album deal that the band signed with the record label back in 2018.

The day before the album's release, the band cancelled its three supporting tour dates at Brooklyn Steel (September 19), Chicago's Riot Fest (September 21) and Steelhouse Omaha (September 22), stating: "We're heartbroken to announce that our upcoming record release shows have been cancelled. The warm-up shows we played earlier this week resulted in Conor losing his voice and, on the advice of doctors, we've made the difficult but sensible decision to prioritise rest and recuperation for the remainder of the month." On September 27, the band cancelled all of their 2024 tour dates following medical tests which determined Oberst "developed a condition that is exacerbated by excessive singing, requiring both treatment and recuperation". Their statement continued: "We are confident that with a successful regimen, and continued medical attention, we will be able to return to the road next year." On October 23, Oberst posted a video message in which he thanked fans for their messages of support and reported "feeling a lot better". He also commented that he anticipated the band would resume their tour at the end of January 2025. The tour resumed on January 16, 2025, with a show at The Van Buren in Phoenix.

== Critical reception ==
Professional ratings
Aggregate scores
| Source | Rating |
|---|---|
| AnyDecentMusic? | 7.2/10 |
| Metacritic | 74/100 |
Review scores
| Source | Rating |
| AllMusic | 3.5/5 stars |
| Beats Per Minute | 82% |
| DIY | 4/5 stars |
| The Line of Best Fit | 7/10 |
| Mojo | 3/5 stars |
| Record Collector | 3/5 stars |
| Uncut | 8/10 |
| Under the Radar | 7.5/10 |

Five Dice, All Threes received favorable reviews from music critics. The album has a score of 74 out of 100 on Metacritic, indicating "generally favorable reviews", based on 9 reviews.

Fred Thomas of AllMusic wrote, "Oberst's storytelling songwriting remains despairing and maudlin, but he seems more self-aware of this than ever before, injecting some triumph and levity into these songs that suggest he's not just smiling through the pain, but laughing at how ridiculous life can be, and maybe even secretly a little bit grateful for being able to experience it all."

== Track listing ==
Five Dice, All Threes track listing
| No. | Title | Writer(s) | Length |
|---|---|---|---|
| 1. | "Five Dice" | | 1:39 |
| 2. | "Bells and Whistles" | Conor Oberst; Alex Orange Drink | 4:07 |
| 3. | "El Capitan" | Oberst | 3:54 |
| 4. | "Bas Jan Ader" | Oberst; Alex Orange Drink | 3:54 |
| 5. | "Tiny Suicides" | Oberst; Nate Walcott; Alex Orange Drink | 4:44 |
| 6. | "All Threes" (featuring Cat Power) | Oberst; Walcott | 5:24 |
| 7. | "Rainbow Overpass" (featuring Alex Orange Drink) | Oberst; Alex Orange Drink | 3:01 |
| 8. | "Hate" | Oberst; Walcott; Alex Orange Drink | 4:52 |
| 9. | "Real Feel 105°" | Oberst | 3:25 |
| 10. | "Spun Out" | Oberst; Walcott | 3:36 |
| 11. | "Trains Still Run on Time" | Oberst; Alex Orange Drink | 3:47 |
| 12. | "The Time I Have Left" (featuring Matt Berninger) | Oberst; Walcott | 3:32 |
| 13. | "Tin Soldier Boy" | Oberst; Alex Orange Drink | 4:59 |
| Total length: | | | 50:54 |

== Personnel ==
=== Musicians ===
Bright Eyes

- Conor Oberst – vocal, acoustic and electric guitars, baritone acoustic guitar, production
- Mike Mogis – pedal steel, electric guitar, manjo, Dobro, mandolin, banjo, production, recording, mixing
- Nathaniel Walcott – piano, trumpet, synthesizers, organs, Mellotron, electric piano, celeste, glockenspiel, string and horn arrangements, production

Additional musicians

- Jason Boesel – drums (tracks 2–7, 9–11, 13), vocals (tracks 4, 7, 11, 13), percussion (tracks 2, 6, 10)
- Alex Orange Drink – vocals (tracks 2, 4, 7, 8, 11, 13), whistling (track 2)
- Amy Carey – whistling (track 2)
- Vikram Devasthali – trombone (tracks 2, 4, 13)
- Josh Johnson – alto, tenor, and baritone saxophones (tracks 2, 4, 7, 13)
- Macey Taylor – bass (tracks 2–11, 13), vocals (tracks 4, 11, 13)
- Griffin Goldsmith – drums (track 3–8, 10, 13), percussion (tracks 2, 6, 10), vocals (tracks 4, 7, 9, 11, 13)
- Adam Reich – acoustic guitar (tracks 5, 7), electric guitar (track 8)
- Cat Power – vocals (track 6)
- Corina Figueroa Escamilla – vocals (track 7)
- James King – tenor and baritone saxophones (track 7)
- Jake Bellows – vocals (track 10), guitar (track 10)
- Paul Cartwright – violin (tracks 11)
- Luanne Homzy – violin (tracks 11)
- Jennifer Takamatsu – violin (tracks 11)
- Zach Dellinger – viola (tracks 11)
- Vanessa Freebairn-Smith – cello (tracks 11)
- Matt Berninger – vocals (track 12)
- Michaela Favara – vocals (track 13)
- Sarah Greenwell – vocals (track 13)
- Jamie Montes – vocals (track 13)

=== Technical ===
- Adam Roberts – engineering, additional production
- Pierre de Reeder – additional horn engineering (tracks 2, 4, 7, 13), additional string engineering (track 11)
- Chan Marshall – vocal production (track 6), vocal arrangement (track 6)
- Adam Blastevic – vocal engineering (track 6), vocal mixing (track 6)
- Nick Lloyd – vocal engineering (track 12)
- Eric (E. Babbs) Barber – additional production (track 12)
- Stella Mogis – research assistant
- Brian Lee – mastering
- Bob Jackson – mastering

=== Artwork ===
- Zack Nipper – diorama, artwork, layout
- Rob Walters – diorama and dice photography

== Charts ==
Chart performance for Five Dice, All Threes
| Chart (2024) | Peak position |
|---|---|
| German Albums (Offizielle Top 100) | 38 |
| Scottish Albums (OCC) | 19 |
| Swiss Albums (Schweizer Hitparade) | 85 |
| UK Album Downloads (OCC) | 27 |
| UK Independent Albums (OCC) | 9 |
