= Katie Pruitt =

American singer-songwriter

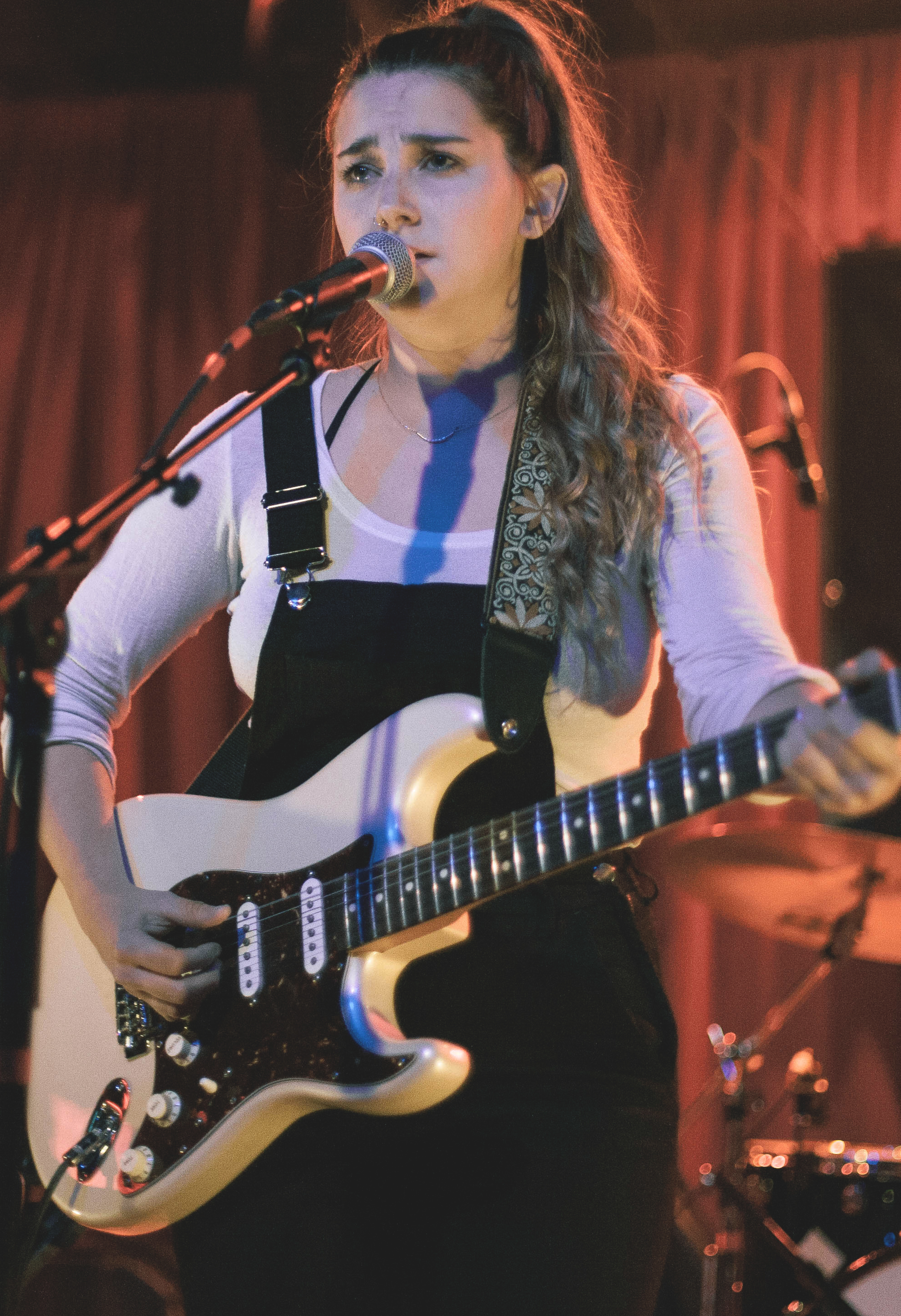
- Pruitt in 2016

Background information
- Born: Katherine Nicole Pruitt; March 4, 1994 (age 32); Atlanta, Georgia, US
- Genres: Americana; alternative country; alternative rock; folk; pop
- Occupations: Singer, songwriter, record producer
- Instruments: Vocals, guitar
- Years active: 2018–present
- Label: Rounder Records (2019–present)
- Website: katiepruitt.com

Katherine Nicole Pruitt (born March 4, 1994) is an American singer-songwriter based in Nashville, Tennessee. Her debut album, Expectations, was released in 2020 by Rounder Records. Her second album, Mantras, was released in 2024.

== Early life and education ==
Pruitt grew up in the suburbs of Atlanta, Georgia. She was raised in a Catholic family and attended Catholic school. She began singing as a child in musical theatre productions. She began learning guitar in middle school with her mother teaching her basic chords and hymns. Pruitt continued singing at open mic nights in Athens, Georgia while attending community college.

She attended Belmont University in Nashville, Tennessee, where she joined a band and received the first annual Nashville Songwriting Scholarship from the BMI Foundation.

== Career ==
In 2017, Pruitt was awarded the Buddy Holly Prize from the Songwriters Hall of Fame and signed with Round Hill Records.

Her EP, OurVinyl Live Session EP was released in March 2018. She was named by Rolling Stone as one of 10 new country artists you need to know and by NPR as one of the 20 artists to watch, highlighting Pruitt as someone who "possesses a soaring, nuanced and expressive voice, and writes with devastating honesty".

On September 13, 2019, Pruitt released "Expectations", the title track from her full-length debut. Additional singles from this project were subsequently released: "Loving Her" on October 21, 2019, and "Out of the Blue" on November 15, 2019.

On February 21, 2020, Pruitt's debut album, Expectations, was released by Rounder Records. She earned a nomination for Emerging Act of the Year at the 2020 Americana Music Honors & Awards. In the same year, she duetted with Canadian singer-songwriter Donovan Woods on "She Waits for Me to Come Back Down", a track from his album Without People.

In 2021 the artist was inter alia part of the Newport Folk Festival in July.

On March 18, 2022, Pruitt recorded an episode of The Caverns Sessions (previously known as Bluegrass Underground), which aired nationally on PBS on October 15, 2022.

In June 2026, Pruitt announced her third studio album Fools for the Fleeting, which was released on September 18, 2026.

== Artistry ==
With roots in folk music, Pruitt attributes growing up in the south of the United States as a key influence on her songwriting, both stylistically and thematically.

Her music often deals with complex coming-of-age issues such as mental health, navigating toxic relationships, and questioning religious faith. She describes the tension between coming out as a lesbian and growing up in a conservative household while attending Catholic school as the catalyst for using her music as a platform to speak openly and honestly about issues faced by LGBTQ youth. She has said in interviews that she hopes her music makes young people struggling with their sexuality feel less alone.

Pruitt cites Brandi Carlile as an inspiration for her music.

== Discography ==
=== Studio albums ===
- Expectations (2020)
- Mantras (2024)
- Fools for the Fleeting (2026)

=== Extended plays ===
- The Pleasantville Sessions (2025)

=== Singles ===
List of singles, with selected peak chart positions
Title	Year	Peak chart positions	Album
Title	Year	US AAA	Album
"Expectations"	2019	20	Expectations
"Loving Her"	2019	—	Expectations
"Out of the Blue"	2019	—	Expectations
"Ohio"	2020	—	Non-album singles
"After the Gold Rush"	2020	—	Non-album singles
"Blood Related"	2024	—	Mantras
"White Lies, White Jesus, and You"	2024	—	Mantras
"All My Friends"	2024	—	Mantras
"—" denotes single did not chart or was not released in that territory

== Awards and nominations ==
Year	Award	Artist/work	Category	Result	Ref.
2020	Americana Music Honors & Awards	Katie Pruitt	Emerging Act of the Year	Nominated	
2021	Pop Awards	Katie Pruitt	Emerging Artist of the Year	Won	
