= 28 (song) =

2024 song by Zach Bryan

Song by Zach Bryan

from the album The Great American Bar Scene
- Released: July 4, 2024
- Genre: Country; country folk
- Length: 3:53
- Label: Warner; Belting Bronco
- Songwriter: Zach Bryan
- Producer: Zach Bryan

"28" is a song by American country music singer Zach Bryan—released on July 4, 2024, as the fourth track from his fifth studio album The Great American Bar Scene. It was written and produced by Bryan himself, the song debuted and peaked at number fourteen on the US Billboard Hot 100.

== Composition ==
"28" is a country folk song with a tempo of 81 beats per minute and has a total length of 3 minutes and 53 seconds.

== Critical reception ==
Lauren Boisvert of American Songwriter stated that "the [song’s] lyrics evoke images of Boston, Brooklyn, crowded bars, and a tear-streaked face, as well as feelings of relief, love, and endurance." Boisvert also had an assumption that "28"’s inspiration could have been [about] Bryan’s at the time girlfriend, Brianna LaPagia—namely with the songs lyrics: "Took twenty-eight years of blood pumping through me / To get to this evening with you."

== Chart performance ==
"28" debuted and peaked at number 14 on the US Billboard Hot 100 the week of July 20, 2024–becoming the second highest-charting song by Bryan that week, only below the number 12 position of "Pink Skies". "28" would remain on the US Billboard Hot 100 for 20 weeks before falling off the chart.

== Charts ==
=== Weekly charts ===
Weekly chart performance for "28"
Chart (2024)	Peak position
Australia (ARIA)	41
Canada Hot 100 (Billboard)	18
Global 200 (Billboard)	25
Ireland (IRMA)	17
New Zealand Hot Singles (RMNZ)	3
UK Singles (OCC)	73
US Billboard Hot 100	14
US Hot Country Songs (Billboard)	5
US Hot Rock & Alternative Songs (Billboard)	4

=== Year-end charts ===
2024 year-end chart performance for "28"
Chart (2024)	Position
Canada (Canadian Hot 100)	79
US Hot Country Songs (Billboard)	30
US Hot Rock & Alternative Songs (Billboard)	17

2025 year-end chart performance for "28"
Chart (2025)	Position
US Hot Country Songs (Billboard)	82
US Hot Rock & Alternative Songs (Billboard)	34

== Certifications ==
Certifications for "28"
Region	Certification	Certified units/sales
Australia (ARIA)	2× Platinum	140,000^{‡}
Canada (Music Canada)	4× Platinum	320,000^{‡}
New Zealand (RMNZ)	Platinum	30,000^{‡}
United Kingdom (BPI)	Silver	200,000^{‡}
^{‡} Sales+streaming figures based on certification alone.
