= All of Me (21 Savage song) =

2024 song by 21 Savage

Song by 21 Savage

from the album American Dream
- Released: January 12, 2024
- Recorded: 2023
- Genre: Hip hop
- Length: 3:19
- Label: Slaughter Gang; Epic
- Songwriters: Shéyaa Abraham-Joseph; Sterling White; Raphael Oliveira; Khaya Gilika; Yakki Davis; Jalen Jackson; Jared Brown; Douglas Whitehead
- Producer: Spiff Sinatra

"All of Me" is a song by Atlanta-based rapper 21 Savage. It was released through Slaughter Gang and Epic Records as the second track from the former's third studio album, American Dream, on January 12, 2024. The song contains a sample of the song "Wishing on a Star" by Rose Royce. The song was produced by Spiff Sinatra with additional production from Isaiah Brown, Jared Brown, and Noc.

== Background ==
The song was first previewed in the background of the trailer for 21 Savage's upcoming biopic American Dream: The 21 Savage Story released just four days before the album, on January 8, 2024.

== Critical reception ==
Writing for Clash, Robin Murray wrote that the track is a "highlight" of the album and that the track "spotlight[s] his effortless trap-leaning flows". Pitchfork's Matthew Ritchie wrote that "Gwen Dickey’s lilting voice echoes in the background" of the song creates "a morose arena in which 21 dwells upon the violence and backstabbing he survived to reach this stage of his life". Grant Rindner for Vibe stated that the song includes his "21’s strongest rap skills" due to his "caustic sense of humor and deadpan delivery".

== Personnel ==
=== Musicians ===
- Shéyaa Abraham-Joseph – lead artist, vocals, songwriter, composer
- Sterling White – production, songwriter, composer, drums, keyboards
- Raphael Oliveira – production, songwriter, composer, drums
- Jared Brown – additional production, songwriter, composer
- Isaiah Brown – additional production, songwriter, composer
- Khaya "Macxsn" Gilika – additional production, songwriter, composer
- Yakki Davis – songwriter, composer
- Jalen Jackson – songwriter, composer, keyboards

=== Technical ===
- Isaiah Brown – recording
- Mike Bozzi – mastering
- Miles Walker – mixing
- Shawn Pedan – assistant engineer
- Jared Brown – assistant engineer
- Khaya "Macxsn" Gilika – assistant engineer

== Charts ==
Chart performance for "All of Me"
Chart (2024)	Peak position
Australia (ARIA)	63
Australia Hip Hop/R&B (ARIA)	18
Canada Hot 100 (Billboard)	18
France (SNEP)	177
Global 200 (Billboard)	24
Latvia (LAIPA)	17
Lithuania (AGATA)	25
New Zealand Hot Singles (RMNZ)	6
Poland (Polish Streaming Top 100)	88
South Africa (TOSAC)	17
UK Streaming (OCC)	64
US Billboard Hot 100	18
US Hot R&B/Hip-Hop Songs (Billboard)	8

== Certifications ==
Certifications for "All of Me"
Region	Certification	Certified units/sales
Canada (Music Canada)	Gold	40,000^{‡}
^{‡} Sales+streaming figures based on certification alone.
