= Atrophy (band) =

American thrash metal band

- Also known as: Heresy (1986–1987)
- Origin: Tucson, Arizona, U.S.
- Genre: Thrash metal
- Years active: 1986–1993; 2015–2020; 2021–present
- Labels: Roadrunner; Massacre
- Members: Brian Zimmerman; Mark Coglan; Nathan Montalvo; Josh Gibbs; Kris Kerby
- Past members: Rick Skowron; Chris Lykins; James Gulotta; Curtis Johnson; Rich Olsen; Casper Garret; Jim Gibson; Scott Heller; Tim Kelly; Denny Seefieldt; Bobby Stein; Jonas Schütz; Sage Johnson; Alex Bosson

Atrophy is an American thrash metal band formed in Tucson, Arizona in 1986. The band released two studio albums in their initial stint before disbanding. In the latter half of the 2010s, the band went on a European tour before vocalist Brian Zimmerman left the band due to COVID-19. The original band members continued and recruited a new vocalist, changing the band name to Scars of Atrophy. In 2021, Brian Zimmerman reformed the band without any of its original members, and released the band's third studio album, Asylum, in 2024.

== Career ==
Atrophy, originally named Heresy, was formed in 1986 by Chris Lykins, James Gulotta, and Brian Zimmerman. Brian and Chris were school friends. Tim Kelly and Rick Skowron later joined the band.

In 1987, they produced two cassette demos and were subsequently picked up by heavy metal label, Roadrunner Records, which released two albums: Socialized Hate in 1988 and Violent by Nature in 1990. These albums saw Atrophy tour the U.S. and Europe, or play selected shows, with bands including Slayer, Exodus, Suicidal Tendencies, Testament, Sacred Reich, Dark Angel, Forced Entry, Coroner, D.R.I., Flotsam and Jetsam, Death Angel and Venom. Following their 1990 European tour with Sacred Reich and Venom, Lykins left the band to pursue a medical school course, and as a consequence, Atrophy was dropped from Roadrunner. Attempts were made in the early 1990s to continue without Lykins and record a third album; by 1993, however, the band had broken up. Zimmerman would explain that the band was dropped by its label.

Atrophy reformed in 2015 with a new lineup, including three original members (Zimmerman, Gulotta and Kelly) and two different guitarists as the replacements of Lykins and Skowron (Casper Garret and Rich Olsen, who was later replaced by Bobby Stein). The band's lineup had changed multiple times, with Zimmerman as the only remaining original member, by the 2024 release of their third album Asylum. As of March 2024, Atrophy has begun writing new material for a fourth album. The band was working on arranging tours for both sides of the Atlantic.

== Members ==
=== Current members ===
- Brian Zimmerman – vocals
- Mark Coglan – guitars
- Nathan Montalvo – guitars
- Josh Gibbs – bass
- Kris Kerby – drums

=== Former members ===
- Rick Skowron – guitars
- Chris Lykins – guitars
- Jesse Callin – guitars
- Rich Olsen – guitars
- Bobby Stein – guitars
- Denny Seefieldt – guitars
- Casper Garrett – guitars
- James Gulotta – bass
- Curtis Johnson - vocals
- Scott Heller – bass
- Tim Kelly – drums
- Jonas Schütz – drums
- Sage Johnson – drums
- Alex Bosson – drums

== Discography ==
=== Studio albums ===
- Socialized Hate (1988)
- Violent by Nature (1990)
- Asylum (2024)

=== Demos ===
- Chemical Dependency demo (1987)
- "Advanced Promo" demo (1987)
- Chemical Dependency demo (2020)

=== Compilations ===
- Demolition – Scream Your Brains Out! (1988) – Metal Forces compilation with the songs "Chemical Dependency" and "Preacher, Preacher"
- Stars on Thrash (1988) – Roadrunner Records compilation with the song "Chemical Dependency"
