= Mantras (Katie Pruitt album) =

Studio album by Katie Pruitt
- Released: April 5, 2024
- Studios: The Shed (Nashville); Camp Senia (East Nashville); The Duck (East Nashville); Fishbowl (Nashville); Minutia (Nashville)
- Length: 43:57
- Label: Rounder
- Producers: Jake Finch; Will Honaker; Jason Lehning; Collin Pastore; Mike Robinson

Katie Pruitt chronology
Expectations (2020)	Mantras (2024)	The Pleasantville Sessions (2025)

Singles from Mantras
- 1. "Blood Related" Released: November 17, 2023; 2. "White Lies, White Jesus and You" Released: January 11, 2024; 3. "All My Friends" Released: February 22, 2024; 4. "Worst Case Scenario" Released: March 14, 2024

Mantras is the second studio album by the American singer-songwriter Katie Pruitt. It was released on April 5, 2024, through Rounder Records and follows her debut studio album, Expectations (2020).

== Background and singles ==
Mantras was recorded at The Shed in Nashville, Tennessee, and features production by Jake Finch and Collin Pastore. It stands as her most personal work to date and describes the "full circle journey from self-sabotage to self-compassion", according to Pruitt. Writing the record forced the singer to stop looking for "external validation" and instead turn her focus inward.

The lead single "Blood Related" was released on November 17, 2023, and showcases Pruitt's signature introspective songwriting about the exploration of complex relationships. The song was followed-up by "White Lies, White Jesus and You" on January 11, 2024, a protest song that deals with the "shedding" of "any remaining shame" caused by the church. On February 22, she shared the song "All My Friends" which was inspired by a Christian Wiman poem and deals with the "evolution of beliefs" as well as the journey of self-discovery. "Worst Case Scenario", a "personal manifesto" of acknowledging one's fears without giving them power, was released as the fourth single on March 14.

A deluxe edition of the album was released on February 7, 2025 with three new songs: a duet version of "White Lies, White Jesus, and You" with S.G. Goodman, an acoustic version of "Worst Case Scenario", and a reworked version of "Standstill", featuring song co-writer Ruston Kelly.

== Track listing ==
All tracks are written by Katie Pruitt, except where noted.

Mantras track listing
No.	Title	Length
1.	"All My Friends"	3:17
2.	"White Lies, White Jesus and You"	4:24
3.	"Self Sabotage"	3:52
4.	"Leading Actress" (Pruitt, Josie Dunne, Will Honaker)	4:23
5.	"Jealous of the Boys"	4:21
6.	"Blood Related"	3:40
7.	"Naive Again"	4:18
8.	"The Waitress"	3:18
9.	"Worst Case Scenario"	3:26
10.	"Phases of the Moon" (Pruitt, John Williamson)	4:48
11.	"Standstill" (Pruitt, Ruston Kelly)	4:10
Total length:		43:57

Mantras deluxe bonus tracks
No.	Title	Length
12.	"White Lies, White Jesus and You" (with S.G. Goodman)	4:42
13.	"Worst Case Scenario" (acoustic)	3:55
14.	"Standstill" (with Ruston Kelly; written by Pruitt and Kelly)	4:08

== Personnel ==
Credits are adapted from the album's liner notes and Tidal.

=== Musicians ===
- Katie Pruitt – vocals (all tracks), guitar (tracks 1–9, 11), background vocals (1, 3–11), keyboards (2, 5, 6), glockenspiel (7), acoustic guitar (12, 13)
- Jake Finch – drums (1–9), bass guitar (1–7), guitar (1–3, 5, 6, 9), keyboards (1, 3, 5–8); background vocals, pedal steel (1); strings (3, 5, 6), banjo (3), glockenspiel (5), mandolin (6)
- Collin Pastore – guitar (1–3, 5–9), keyboards (1, 3, 5, 7, 8), pedal steel (1, 5), background vocals (1)
- Anthony da Costa – guitar (1–3, 9)
- Will Honaker – guitar, keyboards (4)
- Hadley Kennary – background vocals (5, 9)
- Camille Faulkner – strings (6–8)
- Jennifer Pruitt – background vocals (6)
- Taylor Ivey – bass guitar (10)
- Kevin McGowan – drums (10)
- Johnny Williamson – guitar (10)
- Kris Donegan – guitar (10)
- Dave Cohen – keyboards (10)
- Ruston Kelly – background vocals (11), vocals (14)
- Laura Epling – string arrangement, strings (11)
- Jess Nolan – background vocals (11)
- Maggie Chaffee – strings (11)
- Ross Holmes – strings (12)
- S.G. Goodman – vocals (12)
- Mike Robinson – programming (13)
- Jason Lehning – piano (14)

=== Technical and creative ===
- Collin Pastore – production, mixing, recording (1–9); additional recording (4)
- Jake Finch – production, recording (1–9); additional recording (4)
- Paul Blakemore – mastering
- Will Honaker – production, recording (4)
- Jason Lehning – production, recording (10, 14)
- Mike Robinson – production, recording (11, 13)
- Gary Paczosa – mixing (10–13), recording (12), additional recording (1–3, 5–9)
- Alysse Gafkjen – photography
- Sami Wideberg – package design
