= Asylum (Atrophy album) =

Studio album by Atrophy
- Released: March 15, 2024
- Recorded: 2023
- Genre: Thrash metal
- Length: 44:16
- Label: Massacre
- Producer: Alex Parra

Atrophy chronology
Violent by Nature (1990)	Asylum (2024)

Singles from Asylum
- 1. "Punishment for All" Released: February 6, 2024; 2. "Seeds of Sorrow" Released: February 22, 2024

Asylum is the third studio album by American thrash metal band Atrophy, released on March 15, 2024. This is their first studio album in 34 years, following Violent by Nature (1990), the longest gap between studio albums for the band. It is also the first Atrophy album to be recorded with a different lineup (with vocalist Brian Zimmerman as the sole remaining original member, and guitarists Mark Coglan and Nathan Montalvo, bassist Josh Gibbs and drummer Jonas Schütz replacing Chris Lykins, Rick Skowron, James Gulotta and Tim Kelly, respectively) and their first release on Massacre Records.

== Track listing ==
All tracks are written by Mark Coglan, Brian Zimmerman.

Asylum track listing
No.	Title	Length
1.	"Punishment for All"	4:16
2.	"High Anxiety"	4:27
3.	"Seeds of Sorrow"	5:32
4.	"Distortion"	5:27
5.	"Bleeding Out"	4:02
6.	"American Dream [Feat. Kragen Lum]"	4:14
7.	"Close My Eyes"	5:55
8.	"The Apostle"	4:24
9.	"Five Minutes 'Til Suicide"	5:59
Total length:		44:16

== Personnel ==
=== Atrophy ===
- Brian Zimmerman – vocals
- Mark Coglan – guitars
- Nathan Montalvo – guitars
- Josh Gibbs – bass
- Jonas Schütz – drums
