= Amelia (Laurie Anderson album) =

Studio album by Laurie Anderson
- Released: August 30, 2024
- Studios: Canal Street Communications (New York City); Besední dům (Brno, Czech Republic); Miraval Studios (Correns, France)
- Genre: Experimental
- Length: 34:40
- Label: Nonesuch
- Producer: Laurie Anderson

Laurie Anderson chronology
Dokument #2 (2020)	Amelia (2024)

Amelia is the eighth solo studio album by American avant-garde musician Laurie Anderson. It was released on August 30, 2024, through Nonesuch Records, making it her third album for the label. Produced by Anderson herself, it features contributions from Anohni, Filharmonie Brno, Trimbach Trio, Martha Mooke, Marc Ribot, Kenny Wollesen, Tony Sherr and Ryan Kelly. The album debuted at number 41 in Switzerland, number 46 in Scotland and number 74 in Portugal. The album is a mixture of musical and spoken word performance by Anderson.

The album tributes Amelia Earhart, an American aviation pioneer, who disappeared in the vicinity of an isolated island in the western Pacific Ocean in 1937 and was declared dead in 1939.

== Critical reception ==
Professional ratings
Aggregate scores
Source	Rating
AnyDecentMusic?	7.8/10
Metacritic	81/100
Review scores
Source	Rating
AllMusic	3.5/5 stars
Clash	9/10
Pitchfork	7.1/10
PopMatters	9/10
Robert Christgau	A−
Spectrum Culture	88/100%
Spin	B+
The Arts Desk	4/5 stars
The Observer	3/5 stars
Uncut	4/5 stars

Amelia was met with generally favourable reviews from music critics. At Metacritic, which assigns a normalized rating out of 100 to reviews from mainstream publications, the album received an average score of 81 based on twelve reviews. The aggregator AnyDecentMusic? has the critical consensus of the album at a 7.8 out of 10, based on eight reviews.

Mat Smith of Clash praised the album, stating: "Amelia is this a towering work of artistic endeavour and creative genius which comfortably ranks as one of Anderson's most definitive statements yet". Chris Ingalls of PopMatters called it "a graceful, highly compelling, and entirely successful attempt to musically interpret an important historical event with dignity and eloquence". Valerie Polichar of Spectrum Culture wrote: "by turns delicate, grand and distraught, in this telling of another woman's story, Amelia may in some ways be Anderson's most personal album yet". David Harris of Spin resumed: "on Amelia, Anderson resurrects this courageous woman and gives her breath, heart, and soul. It is impossible to hear this aerial ballet and walk away unaffected". Mark Kidel of The Arts Desk called it "the soundtrack for a film we play in our minds while listening". Piers Martin of Uncut concluded: "Anderson's admiration and affection for this feminist icon is such that you come away from Amelia with a greater respect for those who keep on taking risks". Philip Sherburne of Pitchfork found the album "flits briskly from scene to scene, with just enough musical backing to flesh out the atmosphere: shimmering oceanic drones; subtly driving pulses; dissonant whorls abruptly smoothed into reassuring consonance". AllMusic's Mark Deming wrote: "Amelia might have worked better if Anderson had kept the focus on Earhart's internal dialogue as she struggled to live up to the goal she set for herself and why she chose such a brave and challenging feat, but as it is, it's a collection of interesting ideas and striking moments where the whole doesn't quite equal the sum of the parts".

In his mixed review for The Observer, Damien Morris wrote: "the project's biggest failing is its artless shifting of perspectives between anodyne reportage and first-person journalling, leaving it neither compendious nor immediate enough. As the darker, desperate hours close in amid the chaos and confusion of "The Wrong Way" and "Fly Into the Sun", Amelia finally takes off, but it's a long runway to get there".

== Track listing ==
All tracks are written by Laura Anderson.

No.	Title	Length
1.	"To Circle the World"	1:02
2.	"I See Something Shining"	0:29
3.	"Take-off"	1:06
4.	"Aloft" (featuring Anohni)	1:10
5.	"San Juan"	1:49
6.	"Brazil"	1:00
7.	"Crossing the Equator" (featuring Anohni)	2:07
8.	"The Badlands"	0:39
9.	"Waves of Sand"	1:52
10.	"The Letter"	1:54
11.	"India and on Down to Australia" (featuring Anohni)	3:51
12.	"This Modern World"	0:34
13.	"Flying at Night"	3:18
14.	"The Word for Woman Here"	2:11
15.	"Road to Mandalay"	1:48
16.	"Broken Chronometers"	0:46
17.	"Nothing But Silt"	0:49
18.	"The Wrong Way" (featuring Anohni)	1:06
19.	"Fly Into the Sun" (featuring Petr Pšenica)	2:51
20.	"Howland Island"	1:07
21.	"Radio" (featuring Anohni)	1:58
22.	"Lucky Dime"	1:13
Total length:		34:40

== Personnel ==
- Laura Phillips "Laurie" Anderson – lyrics, voice, keyboards, viola, producer
- Anohni Hegarty – vocals (tracks: 4, 7, 11, 18, 21)
- Amelia Earhart – voice (track 12)
- Martha Mooke – viola
- Marc Ribot – guitar
- Tony Sherr – bass
- Kenny Wollesen – percussion
- Ryan Kelly – ukulele, recording
- Rob Moose – violin, string arrangements
- Nadia Sirota – viola
- Gabriel Cabezas – cello
- Dennis Russell Davies – conductor, string arrangements
- Marie Petříková – concertmaster, first violin
- Barbora Gajdošová – first violin
- Jaromír Graffe – first violin
- Kristýna Jungová – first violin
- Jiří Kopecký – first violin
- Vladimír Lžičař – first violin
- Marie Pšenicová – first violin
- Leoš Zavadilík – first violin
- Radoslav Havlát – second violin
- Jana Horáková – second violin
- Dorothea Kellerová – second violin
- Ludmila Netolická – second violin
- Josef Ondrůj – second violin
- Tomáš Vinklát – second violin
- Petr Pšenica – principal viola, production assistant
- Martin Heller – viola
- Tomáš Kulík – viola
- Karel Plocek – viola
- Otakar Salajka – viola
- Zbyněk Volf – viola
- Pavla Jelínková – cello
- Eva Kovalová – cello
- Katarína Madariová – cello
- Lukáš Svoboda – cello
- Marek Švestka – principal double bass
- Jaromír Gardoň – double bass
- Vojtech Velíšek – double bass
- Jaroslav Zouhar – recording
- Damien Quintard – recording, mixing, mastering

== Charts ==
Chart (2024)	Peak position
Portuguese Albums (AFP)	74
Scottish Albums (Official Charts)	46
Swiss Albums (Schweizer Hitparade)	41
UK Album Downloads (Official Charts)	31
US Top Classical Albums (Billboard)	1
US Top Classical Crossover Albums (Billboard)	1
