= Née-Nah =

2024 single by 21 Savage, Travis Scott, and Metro Boomin

Single by 21 Savage, Travis Scott, and Metro Boomin

from the album American Dream
- Released: January 23, 2024
- Recorded: 2023
- Genre: Trap
- Length: 3:48
- Label: Slaughter Gang; Epic
- Songwriters: Shéyaa Abraham-Joseph; Jacques Webster II; Leland Wayne; Douglas Whitehead
- Producer: Metro Boomin

21 Savage singles chronology
"Redrum" / "N.H.I.E." (2024)	"Née-Nah" (2024)	"Prove It" (2024)

Travis Scott singles chronology
"Water" (remix) (2023)	"Née-Nah" (2024)	"Fein" (2024)

Metro Boomin singles chronology
"Calling" (2023)	"Née-Nah" (2024)	"Type Shit" (2024)

"Née-Nah" is a song by British-American rapper 21 Savage, American rapper and singer Travis Scott, and American record producer Metro Boomin. It was sent to US rhythmic radio through Slaughter Gang and Epic Records as the third single from the former's third studio album, American Dream, on January 23, 2024. Produced solely by Metro Boomin, the three artists wrote the song alongside Dougie F.

== Critical reception ==
Ratings Game Music praised Travis Scott for his verse on the song, explaining that "his punchlines are crisp, he doesn't sound as robotic, and his confidence is on another level" and also praised 21 Savage, "highlighting the aggression he raps with, how competitive his lyrics are, and his easy-to-understand punchlines". Matthew Ritchie for Pitchfork felt that Travis Scott is one of the "vestigial appendages" on the album. Rolling Stone's Mosi Reeves described him as one of the "bold-faced names" to appear on the album.

== Personnel ==
=== Musicians ===
- Shéyaa Abraham-Joseph – lead artist, vocals, songwriter, composer
- Jacques Webster II – lead artist, vocals, songwriter, composer
- Leland Wayne – lead artist, production, vocals, songwriter, composer
- Drake - Backing vocals (Uncredited)
- Douglas Whitehead – songwriter, composer

=== Technical ===
- Isaiah Brown – recording
- Mike Bozzi – mastering
- Miles Walker – mixing
- Shawn Pedan – assistant engineer

== Charts ==
=== Weekly charts ===
Weekly chart performance for "Née-Nah"
Chart (2024)	Peak position
Australia (ARIA)	34
Australia Hip Hop/R&B (ARIA)	7
Austria (Ö3 Austria Top 40)	27
Canada Hot 100 (Billboard)	8
Czech Republic Singles Digital (ČNS IFPI)	68
France (SNEP)	108
Global 200 (Billboard)	8
Ireland (IRMA)	27
Italy (FIMI)	82
Latvia (LAIPA)	5
Lithuania (AGATA)	12
Luxembourg (Billboard)	22
Netherlands (Single Top 100)	49
New Zealand (Recorded Music NZ)	23
Norway (VG-lista)	31
Poland (Polish Streaming Top 100)	38
Portugal (AFP)	51
Slovakia Singles Digital (ČNS IFPI)	17
South Africa (TOSAC)	14
Sweden (Sverigetopplistan)	81
Switzerland (Schweizer Hitparade)	12
UAE (IFPI)	14
UK Singles (OCC)	23
UK Hip Hop/R&B (OCC)	8
US Billboard Hot 100	10
US Hot R&B/Hip-Hop Songs (Billboard)	5
US Rhythmic Airplay (Billboard)	9

=== Year-end charts ===
Year-end chart performance for "Née-Nah"
Chart (2024)	Position
US Hot R&B/Hip-Hop Songs (Billboard)	65

== Certifications ==
Certifications for "Née-Nah"
Region	Certification	Certified units/sales
Brazil (Pro-Música Brasil)	Gold	20,000^{‡}
Canada (Music Canada)	Platinum	80,000^{‡}
New Zealand (RMNZ)	Gold	15,000^{‡}
United States (RIAA)	Platinum	1,000,000^{‡}
^{‡} Sales+streaming figures based on certification alone.
