= List of 2024 albums =

The following is a list of albums, EPs, and mixtapes released in 2024. These albums are (1) original, i.e. excluding reissues, remasters, and compilations of previously released recordings, and (2) notable, defined as having received significant coverage from reliable sources independent of the subject.

For additional information about bands formed, reformed, disbanded, or on hiatus, for deaths of musicians, and for links to musical awards, see 2024 in music.

== First quarter ==
=== January ===
List of albums released in January 2024
Go to: January | February | March | April | May | June | July | August | September | October | November | December | Back to top
Release date	Artist	Album	Genre	Label	Ref.
January 4	Luis R. Conriquez	Corridos Bélicos, Vol. IV	Regional Mexican	Kartel Music	
January 5	Shed Seven	A Matter of Time	Britpop	Cooking Vinyl	
January 5	Sprints	Letter to Self	Garage rock	City Slang	
January 8	Itzy	Born to Be	EDM, dance-pop, rock	JYP, Republic	
January 12	21 Savage	American Dream	Hip-hop, R&B	Epic, Slaughter Gang	
January 12	Allman Brothers Band	Manley Field House, Syracuse University, April 7, 1972	Blues rock, Southern rock	Allman Brothers Band Recording Company	
January 12	Armin van Buuren	Breathe In		Armada Music	
January 12	Bill Ryder-Jones	Iechyd Da		Domino	
January 12	Casey	How to Disappear		Hassle, Greyscale Records	
January 12	D-Block Europe	Rolling Stone		D-Block, EGA Records, UMG	
January 12	Infant Island	Obsidian Wreath		Secret Voice, Deathwish Inc.	
January 12	Kali Uchis	Orquídeas	R&B, reggaeton, synth-pop	Geffen	
January 12	Kid Cudi	Insano	Hip-hop, trap	Republic, Wicked Awesome	
January 12	Magnum	Here Comes the Rain	Hard rock	Steamhammer/SPV	
January 12	Marika Hackman	Big Sigh		Chrysalis	
January 12	Nailah Hunter	Lovegaze	Alt-pop, new-age, art pop	Fat Possum	
January 12	Project 86	Omni, Pt. 2	Metalcore, industrial metal, nu metalcore	Spaceuntravel	
January 12	The Rods	Rattle the Cage		Massacre	
January 12	Vacations	No Place Like Home	Indie pop	No Fun Records, Nettwerk	
January 12	The Vaccines	Pick-Up Full of Pink Carnations	Indie rock	Thirty Tigers, Super Easy	
January 12	Various artists	Mean Girls (Music from the Motion Picture)	Pop	Interscope	
January 15	Nmixx	Fe3O4: Break	K-pop	JYP, Republic	
January 17	Nemophila	Evolve		Masterworks Publishers	
January 19	Black Grape	Orange Head		DGAFF Recordings	
January 19	Ekkstacy	Ekkstacy		Ekkstacy, UnitedMasters	
January 19	Ericdoa	DOA		Listen to the Kids, Interscope	
January 19	Glass Beach	Plastic Death	Progressive rock	Run for Cover	
January 19	Green Day	Saviors	Punk rock	Reprise, Warner	
January 19	Lil Dicky	Penith (The Dave Soundtrack)		Dirty Burd, Inc., Commission Music, BMG	
January 19	Mary Halvorson	Cloudward	Avant-garde jazz	Nonesuch	
January 19	Neck Deep	Neck Deep	Pop-punk	Hopeless	
January 19	Packs	Melt the Honey	Slacker rock	Fire Talk	
January 19	Saxon	Hell, Fire and Damnation	Heavy metal	Silver Lining Music	
January 19	Sleater-Kinney	Little Rope	Punk rock	Loma Vista	
January 19	Slift	Ilion	Progressive rock	Sub Pop	
January 22	Cheekface	It's Sorted		Cheekface	
January 26	Alkaline Trio	Blood, Hair, and Eyeballs	Punk rock, emo	Rise	
January 26	Bad Gyal	La joia		Universal Music Latino, Interscope	
January 26	Benny the Butcher	Everybody Can't Go	Hip-hop	5 to 50, Def Jam	
January 26	Charles Esten	Love Ain't Pretty		Chip Esten	
January 26	Courting	New Last Name	Indie rock	PIAS, Lower Third Records	
January 26	Craig Wedren	The Dream Dreaming		Tough Lover Records	
January 26	Dead Poet Society	Fission		Spinefarm	
January 26	Fabiano de Nascimento and Sam Gendel	The Room		Real World	
January 26	Frank Carter and the Rattlesnakes	Dark Rainbow		International Death Cult, AWAL	
January 26	Future Islands	People Who Aren't There Anymore		4AD	
January 26	Gruff Rhys	Sadness Sets Me Free	Psychedelic pop	Rough Trade	
January 26	James Arthur	Bitter Sweet Love		Columbia	
January 26	Josh Abbott Band	Somewhere Down the Road			
January 26	Katy Kirby	Blue Raspberry	Indie folk	Anti-	
January 26	Kevin Gates	The Ceremony	Hip-hop	Bread Winner's Alumni, Atlantic	
January 26	Philip Glass	Philip Glass Solo		Orange Mountain Music	
January 26	The Reytons	Ballad of a Bystander		The Reytons	
January 26	Sarah Jarosz	Polaroid Lovers		Rounder	
January 26	The Smile	Wall of Eyes		XL	
January 26	Static-X	Project: Regeneration Vol. 2	Industrial metal, nu metal	Otsego Entertainment Group	
January 26	Tom Odell	Black Friday		UROK	
January 26	Torres	What an Enormous Room		Merge	
January 26	Ty Segall	Three Bells		Drag City	
January 26	Various artists	All Is Yellow	Hip-hop, pop	Lyrical Lemonade, Def Jam	
January 29	(G)I-dle	2		Cube	
January 29	Robby Krieger and the Soul Savages	Robby Krieger and the Soul Savages			

=== February ===
List of albums released in February 2024
Go to: January | February | March | April | May | June | July | August | September | October | November | December | Back to top
Release date	Artist	Album	Genre	Label	Ref.
February 2	Enterprise Earth	Death: An Anthology		MNRK	
February 2	Gabby Barrett	Chapter & Verse	Country	Warner Nashville	
February 2	High Valley	Small Town Somethin'		Cage Free Music	
February 2	Icewear Vezzo	Live from the 6		Quality Control	
February 2	J Mascis	What Do We Do Now		Sub Pop	
February 2	J. Robbins	Basilisk		Dischord	
February 2	Kirin J. Callinan	If I Could Sing		Worse Records	
February 2	KMFDM	Let Go	Electro-industrial, industrial rock, industrial metal	Metropolis	
February 2	Kula Shaker	Natural Magick	Rock	Strange F.O.L.K.	
February 2	L Devine	Digital Heartifacts		AWAL	
February 2	The Last Dinner Party	Prelude to Ecstasy	Baroque pop, indie pop, orchestral rock	Island	
February 2	Lee "Scratch" Perry	King Perry	Dub, trip hop	False Idols	
February 2	Liquid Mike	Paul Bunyan's Slingshot	Indie rock, power pop	Liquid Mike	
February 2	The Paranoid Style	The Interrogator		Bar/None	
February 2	Runnner	Starsdust		Run for Cover	
February 2	Talia Schlanger	Grace for the Going		Latent	
February 2	Various artists	Hazbin Hotel (Original Soundtrack)		A24 Music	
February 2	Vera Sola	Peacemaker		City Slang	
February 2	Vijay Iyer Trio	Compassion		ECM	
February 5	P1Harmony	Killin' It		FNC	
February 7	Drop Nineteens	1991	Shoegaze	Wharf Cat Records	
February 7	Thomas Bangalter	Daaaaaalí! (Bande Originale du Film)	Acoustic, instrumental	Ed Banger	
February 9	Brittany Howard	What Now		Island	
February 9	Chelsea Wolfe	She Reaches Out to She Reaches Out to She	Electronica	Loma Vista	
February 9	David Nance & Mowed Sound	David Nance & Mowed Sound		Third Man	
February 9	The Dead South	Chains & Stakes		Six Shooter	
February 9	Declan McKenna	What Happened to the Beach?	Pop rock	Tomplicated Records	
February 9	Ducks Ltd.	Harm's Way	Power pop	Carpark	
February 9	Fivio Foreign	Pain & Love 2		RichFish, LLC, Columbia	
February 9	Helado Negro	Phasor	Avant-pop	4AD	
February 9	Infected Rain	Time		Napalm	
February 9	Jessica Mauboy	Yours Forever		Warner Music Australia	
February 9	Joel Ross	Nublues	Jazz	Blue Note	
February 9	Kali Malone	All Life Long	Drone	Ideologic Organ	
February 9	The Last Ten Seconds of Life	No Name Graves	Deathcore	Unique Leader Records	
February 9	Little Simz	Drop 7		Forever Living Originals, AWAL	
February 9	Loving	Any Light		Last Gang, MNRK	
February 9	Madi Diaz	Weird Faith	Indie rock, indie folk, indie pop	Anti-	
February 9	MitiS	Unity		Ophelia	
February 9	Mk.gee	Two Star & the Dream Police	Bedroom pop	R&R	
February 9	Nothing,Nowhere	Dark Magic		Reapers Realm Records	
February 9	The Pineapple Thief	It Leads to This		Kscope	
February 9	Pouty	Forgot About Me	Power pop	Get Better	
February 9	Pylon Reenactment Society	Magnet Factory		Strolling Bones Records	
February 9	Rhymefest	James & Nikki: A Conversation		Golden State Entertainment	
February 9	Royel Otis	Pratts & Pain	Indie rock	Ourness	
February 9	Shygirl	Club Shy	EDM	Because	
February 9	Usher	Coming Home	R&B, pop	Mega, Gamma	
February 9	Zara Larsson	Venus	Dance-pop	Sommer House, Epic	
February 10	¥$	Vultures 1		YZY	
February 12	Béla Fleck	Rhapsody in Blue		Béla Fleck Productions, Thirty Tigers	
February 16	Les Amazones d'Afrique	Musow Danse		Real World	
February 16	The Aristocrats	Duck			
February 16	Blackberry Smoke	Be Right Here		3 Legged Records	
February 16	Cast	Love Is the Call	Rock	Cast Recordings	
February 16	Charles Leclerc and Sofiane Pamart	Dreamers	Classical	Verdigris Records, 88 Touches	
February 16	Chromeo	Adult Contemporary	Funk	BMG	
February 16	Friko	Where We've Been, Where We Go from Here	Indie rock	ATO	
February 16	Frontier Ruckus	On the Northline	Folk rock, indie pop	Sitcom Universe, Loose Music	
February 16	Grandaddy	Blu Wav	Indie rock, alt country	Dangerbird	
February 16	Heems and Lapgan	Lafandar		Veena Sounds, Mass Appeal India	
February 16	Honeymoon Suite	Alive		Frontiers	
February 16	Idles	Tangk	Art rock, art punk, dance-punk	Partisan	
February 16	Ihsahn	Ihsahn	Progressive metal, black metal	Candlelight	
February 16	James Durbin	Screaming Steel		Frontiers, Durbin	
February 16	Jason Derulo	Nu King	Pop, R&B	Atlantic	
February 16	Jennifer Lopez	This Is Me... Now	Pop, R&B	Nuyorican, BMG	
February 16	Katherine Priddy	The Pendulum Swing		Cooking Vinyl	
February 16	Laura Jane Grace	Hole in My Head	Punk rock, folk punk	Polyvinyl	
February 16	Middle Kids	Faith Crisis Pt 1		Lucky Number Records	
February 16	Mother Mother	Grief Chapter		Warner	
February 16	Nouvelle Vague	Should I Stay or Should I Go?		PIAS	
February 16	The Obsessed	Gilded Sorrow		Ripple Music	
February 16	Omni	Souvenir	Post-punk	Sub Pop	
February 16	The Once	Out Here			
February 16	Paloma Faith	The Glorification of Sadness	Soul, R&B	Sony Music, RCA	
February 16	Quadeca	Scrapyard		DeadAir, AWAL	
February 16	Royel Otis	Pratts & Pain	Indie rock	Ourness	
February 16	San Fermin	Arms		Better Company	
February 16	Sean Ono Lennon	Asterisms	Jazz, experimental music, progressive rock	Tzadik	
February 16	Serpentwithfeet	Grip	Pop, R&B	Secretly Canadian	
February 16	Steve Hackett	The Circus and the Nightwhale		Inside Out	
February 16	Subtronics	Tesseract		Cyclops Recordings	
February 16	Tinlicker	Cold Enough for Snow		PIAS	
February 16	William Doyle	Springs Eternal	Pop	Tough Love Records	
February 16	Yeat	2093		Capitol, Field Trip, Lyfestyle Corporation	
February 19	Le Sserafim	Easy		Source, YG Plus, Geffen	
February 20	IU	The Winning		EDAM	
February 21	Erika de Casier	Still	R&B, electronica	4AD	
February 23	Ace Frehley	10,000 Volts	Hard rock, heavy metal	MNRK	
February 23	Allie X	Girl with No Face	Pop, glam rock	AWAL	
February 23	Amaranthe	The Catalyst		Nuclear Blast	
February 23	Amigo the Devil	Yours Until the War Is Over			
February 23	Austrian Death Machine	Quad Brutal		Napalm	
February 23	Blaze Bayley	Circle of Stone			
February 23	The Body and Dis Fig	Orchards of a Futile Heaven		Thrill Jockey	
February 23	Corb Lund	El Viejo		New West	
February 23	Darkest Hour	Perpetual | Terminal		MNRK Heavy	
February 23	Elephant Stone	Back Into the Dream		Elephants on Parade	
February 23	Erick the Architect	I've Never Been Here Before			
February 23	French Montana	Mac & Cheese 5	Hip-hop	Coke Boys Records, Gamma	
February 23	Ghetts	On Purpose, with Purpose		Ghetts Limited, Warner	
February 23	Glaive	A Bit of a Mad One	Bedroom pop, hyperpop, emo rap	Interscope	
February 23	Glitterer	Rationale		Anti-	
February 23	Hurray for the Riff Raff	The Past Is Still Alive		Nonesuch	
February 23	I Dont Know How but They Found Me	Gloom Division	Art pop, post-punk	Concord	
February 23	Jazmin Bean	Traumatic Livelihood	Pop, alternative pop	Aswang Birthday Cake, Interscope, Island	
February 23	Job for a Cowboy	Moon Healer	Progressive death metal, deathcore	Metal Blade	
February 23	Kalsey Kulyk	Outlaw Poetry			
February 23	Kid Cudi	Insano (Nitro Mega)	Hip-hop	Wicked Awesome, Republic	
February 23	Lætitia Sadier	Rooting for Love	Art rock	Drag City	
February 23	Lil Yachty	Something Ether		Quality Control, Motown	
February 23	Mary Timony	Untame the Tiger		Merge	
February 23	MGMT	Loss of Life	Britpop, indie rock, psychedelic pop	Mom + Pop	
February 23	Mick Mars	The Other Side of Mars	Grunge, hard rock	1313, MRI	
February 23	Modern English	1 2 3 4			
February 23	Nadine Shah	Filthy Underneath		EMI North	
February 23	Philip Sayce	The Wolves Are Coming		Atomic Gemini, Forty Below Records	
February 23	Potter Payper	Thanks for Hating		36 the Label, EGA Records, UMG	
February 23	Real Estate	Daniel	Indie rock, alternative rock	Domino	
February 23	Rod Stewart and Jools Holland	Swing Fever	Swing	Warner	
February 23	Royal Tusk	Altruistic		MNRK	
February 23	Sleepytime Gorilla Museum	Of the Last Human Being		Avant Night, Joyful Noise	
February 23	The Snuts	Millennials	Indie rock	The Orchard, Happy Artist Records	
February 23	The Terrys	Skate Pop			
February 23	Twice	With You-th		JYP	
February 23	Whitelands	Night-bound Eyes Are Blind to the Day		Sonic Cathedral	
February 26	Cravity	Evershine		Starship	
February 28	Shiritsu Ebisu Chugaku	Indigo Hour		Sony Music Japan	
February 28	Stay Inside	Ferried Away	Emo, post-hardcore, post-punk	Stay Inside	
February 29	Donny Benét	Infinite Desires		Donnyland Records	
February 29	Jacob Collier	Djesse Vol. 4		Hajanga Records, Decca, Interscope	

=== March ===
List of albums released in March 2024
Go to: January | February | March | April | May | June | July | August | September | October | November | December | Back to top
Release date	Artist	Album	Genre	Label	Ref.
March 1	Another Sky	Beach Day		Fiction, Republic	
March 1	Ben Frost	Scope Neglect		Mute	
March 1	The Bevis Frond	Focus on Nature		Fire	
March 1	Big Big Train	The Likes of Us	Progressive rock	Inside Out	
March 1	Blind Channel	Exit Emotions	Pop metal, nu metal	Century Media	
March 1	Bruce Dickinson	The Mandrake Project	Heavy metal, hard rock	BMG	
March 1	BryhM (Bruce Hornsby and yMusic)	Deep Sea Vents		Zappo Productions, Thirty Tigers	
March 1	Caravan Palace	Gangbusters Melody Club			
March 1	David Reece	Baptized by Fire		El Puerto	
March 1	Everything Everything	Mountainhead	Synth-pop, indie pop	BMG	
March 1	Faye Webster	Underdressed at the Symphony	Indie rock, R&B	Secretly Canadian	
March 1	Jahari Massamba Unit (Madlib and Karriem Riggins)	YHWH Is Love	Jazz-funk, jazz fusion, underground hip-hop	Law of Rhythm	
March 1	Julian Lage	Speak to Me	Jazz	Blue Note	
March 1	Kaiser Chiefs	Kaiser Chiefs' Easy Eighth Album		Polydor	
March 1	Liam Gallagher and John Squire	Liam Gallagher John Squire	Britpop revival, psychedelic rock	Warner Music UK	
March 1	Mannequin Pussy	I Got Heaven	Hardcore punk, pop rock	Epitaph	
March 1	Michael Kaeshammer	Turn It Up		Seven.One Starwatch, Sony Music	
March 1	Mike Downes	The Way In	Jazz		
March 1	Mildlife	Chorus	Jazz, pop rock	PIAS	
March 1	Ministry	Hopiumforthemasses	Industrial metal	Nuclear Blast	
March 1	New Years Day	Half Black Heart		Another Century	
March 1	Paula Cole	Lo		675 Records	
March 1	Pissed Jeans	Half Divorced		Sub Pop	
March 1	Rhodes	Un-finished		Nettwerk	
March 1	San Cisco	Under the Light		Island City Records	
March 1	Savak	Flavors of Paradise		Ernest Jenning, Peculiar Works Music	
March 1	Schoolboy Q	Blue Lips		TDE, Interscope	
March 1	Sheer Mag	Playing Favorites		Third Man	
March 1	Squarepusher	Dostrotime	IDM	Warp	
March 1	Sultan & Shepard	Endless, Dawn		This Never Happened	
March 1	That Mexican OT	Texas Technician		Manifest Music Group, GoodTalk, Capitol	
March 1	Yard Act	Where's My Utopia?	Pop, dance-rock	Island	
March 3	Michael Head & the Red Elastic Band	Loophole		Modern Sky	
March 6	Mike and Tony Seltzer	Pinball	Hip-hop	10k	
March 6	Olof Dreijer	Coral		AD93	
March 8	Ariana Grande	Eternal Sunshine	Pop, R&B	Republic	
March 8	Bleachers	Bleachers	Pop rock, indie pop	Bleachers Band Recordings, Dirty Hit	
March 8	Bolis Pupul	Letter to Yu	EDM, synth-pop	Deewee	
March 8	Dion	Girl Friends			
March 8	The End Machine	The Quantum Phase			
March 8	Homeshake	CD Wallet		Dine Alone	
March 8	Judas Priest	Invincible Shield	Heavy metal, power metal	Epic	
March 8	Kim Gordon	The Collective	Hip-hop, trap, industrial	Matador	
March 8	Loreena McKennitt	The Road Back Home		Quinlan Road	
March 8	Marshmello and Svdden Death	Mellodeath Tapes Vol. 1	Dubstep	Joytime Collective	
March 8	Meatbodies	Flora Ocean Tiger Bloom		In the Red	
March 8	Moor Mother	The Great Bailout	Experimental	Anti-	
March 8	Nick Johnston	Child of Bliss		Remarkably Human	
March 8	Norah Jones	Visions		Blue Note	
March 8	Ricki-Lee	On My Own		Black Label Entertainment	
March 8	Sonata Arctica	Clear Cold Beyond		Atomic Fire	
March 8	Taj Mahal	Swingin' Live at the Church in Tulsa	Blues	Lightning Rod Records	
March 8	Thank You, I'm Sorry	Repeating Threes		Thank You, I'm Sorry	
March 8	The Whitlams Black Stump	Kookaburra	Country	EGR	
March 8	YoungBoy Never Broke Again	Compliments of Grave Digger Mountain		Motown, Never Broke Again	
March 13	Sekai no Owari	Nautilus		Universal Music	
March 13	Yung Lean and Bladee	Psykos		World Affairs	
March 14	Rezz	Can You See Me?	Electronic	HypnoVision Records	
March 15	The Black Crowes	Happiness Bastards		Silver Arrow Records	
March 15	Charles Lloyd	The Sky Will Still Be There Tomorrow	Jazz	Blue Note	
March 15	Chief Keef and Mike Will Made It	Dirty Nachos		43B, Ear Drummer, RBC	
March 15	Chuck Strangers	A Forsaken Lover's Plea	Hip-hop	Lex	
March 15	Comeback Kid	Trouble		SharpTone	
March 15	The Dandy Warhols	Rockmaker	Alternative rock	Sunset Blvd. Records, Beat the World	
March 15	DragonForce	Warp Speed Warriors	Speed metal, pop metal	Napalm	
March 15	Flo Milli	Fine Ho, Stay		RCA	
March 15	Four Tet	Three	House, downtempo, electronica	Text	
March 15	Gouge Away	Deep Sage	Hardcore punk, post-hardcore, shoegaze	Deathwish Inc.	
March 15	Holly Humberstone	Work in Progress		Polydor, Darkroom, Geffen	
March 15	Justin Timberlake	Everything I Thought It Was	R&B, pop	RCA	
March 15	Kacey Musgraves	Deeper Well	Country folk, soft rock, folk-pop	MCA Nashville, Interscope	
March 15	Ledisi	Good Life	R&B, soul	Listen Back Entertainment, BMG	
March 15	Mad Caddies	Arrows Room 117		55 Rose Records, SBÄM Records	
March 15	The Messthetics and James Brandon Lewis	The Messthetics and James Brandon Lewis	Free improvisation, jazz fusion	Impulse!	
March 15	Night Verses	Every Sound Has a Color in the Valley of Night: Part 2		Equal Vision	
March 15	Peter Garrett	The True North		Sony Music Australia	
March 15	Scott Stapp	Higher Power		Napalm	
March 15	Tierra Whack	World Wide Whack	Hip-hop, jazz-funk, R&B	Interscope	
March 18	Day6	Fourever	K-pop	JYP	
March 20	ExWhyZ	Dress to Kill	J-pop	EMI	
March 20	Jeff Mills	The Trip – Enter the Black Hole		Axis Records, U/M/A/A	
March 20	Scandal	Luminous		Victor Entertainment	
March 20	Young Posse	XXL		DSP	
March 22	Adrianne Lenker	Bright Future		4AD	
March 22	Blanke	Emergence		Monstercat	
March 22	Boris and Coaltar of the Deepers	Hello There	Alternative metal	Dog Knights Productions	
March 22	Cakes da Killa	Black Sheep		Young Art Records	
March 22	Cassie Kinoshi's Seed	Gratitude		International Anthem	
March 22	Christian McBride	But Who's Gonna Play the Melody?		Mack Avenue	
March 22	Chris Young	Young Love & Saturday Nights	Country	RCA Nashville	
March 22	Elbow	Audio Vertigo		Polydor, Geffen	
March 22	Empress Of	For Your Consideration		Major Arcana, Giant	
March 22	Fletcher	In Search of the Antidote		Capitol	
March 22	Gary Clark Jr.	JPEG Raw		Warner	
March 22	Good Morning	Good Morning Seven		Polyvinyl	
March 22	Gossip	Real Power		Columbia	
March 22	Hamferð	Men Guðs hond er sterk		Metal Blade	
March 22	Hozier	Unheard		Rubyworks, Columbia	
March 22	The Jesus and Mary Chain	Glasgow Eyes		Fuzz Club	
March 22	Jlin	Akoma		Planet Mu	
March 22	Joyner Lucas	Not Now, I'm Busy	Hip-hop	Twenty Nine Music Group	
March 22	Julia Holter	Something in the Room She Moves	Art pop	Domino	
March 22	Kenny Chesney	Born	Country	Blue Chair, Warner Nashville	
March 22	Kenya Grace	The After Taste	Drum and bass	Major Recordings, Warner	
March 22	Kita Alexander	Young in Love		Warner Music Australia	
March 22	Logic1000	Mother		Therapy, Because	
March 22	Matt Champion	Mika's Laundry		RCA	
March 22	Metro Boomin and Future	We Don't Trust You	Trap	Freebandz, Boominati, Republic	
March 22	Pnau	Hyperbolic		etcetc	
March 22	Pomme	Saisons		Sois Sage Musique, Polydor	
March 22	Prefuse 73	New Strategies for Modern Crime Vol. 1		Lex	
March 22	Rosali	Bite Down	Folk rock	Merge	
March 22	Rosie Tucker	Utopia Now!	Indie rock	Sentimental Records	
March 22	Sam Evian	Plunge	Power pop, psychedelic	Flying Cloud Recordings, Thirty Tigers	
March 22	Scooter	Open Your Mind and Your Trousers		Sheffield Tunes, Kontor, Virgin	
March 22	Shakira	Las Mujeres Ya No Lloran	Pop, rock, Afrobeats	Sony Music Latin	
March 22	Sierra Ferrell	Trail of Flowers	Americana, bluegrass, old-time	Rounder	
March 22	Starsailor	Where the Wild Things Grow			
March 22	Tchami and Malaa	Veni, Vidi, Vici		Confession	
March 22	Tyla	Tyla	Amapiano, pop, R&B	Epic, Fax Records	
March 22	The Veronicas	Gothic Summer		Big Noise	
March 22	Waxahatchee	Tigers Blood	Indie rock, folk rock, alternative country	Anti-	
March 22	Wye Oak	Shriek: Variations		Merge	
March 22	Zombi	Direct Inject		Relapse	
March 25	Illit	Super Real Me		Belift Lab, YG Plus	
March 25	NCT Dream	Dream()scape	Hip-hop, R&B	SM, Kakao	
March 27	Good Kid	Good Kid 4		Good People Record Co.	
March 28	BlueBucksClan and Hit-Boy	Biggest Out the West	West Coast hip-hop	Surf Club, Out the Blue Records	
March 29	Aaron Lewis	The Hill	Country	Big Machine	
March 29	Anyma	Genesys Part II		Afterlife Recordings	
March 29	Beyoncé	Cowboy Carter	Country, folk, R&B	Parkwood, Columbia	
March 29	Blu DeTiger	All I Ever Want Is Everything		Capitol	
March 29	Chastity Belt	Live Laugh Love		Suicide Squeeze	
March 29	Cindy Lee	Diamond Jubilee		Realistik Studios	
March 29	The Church	Eros Zeta and the Perfumed Guitars		Communicating Vessels	
March 29	Ed Harcourt	El Magnifico		Deathless Recordings	
March 29	Gesaffelstein	Gamma	Industrial techno	Columbia	
March 29	Hardy and various artists	Hixtape: Vol. 3: Difftape	Country	Big Loud	
March 29	The High Llamas	Hey Panda		Drag City	
March 29	J-Hope	Hope on the Street Vol. 1		Big Hit	
March 29	Jim White	All Hits: Memories		Drag City	
March 29	MGK and Trippie Redd	Genre: Sadboy	Emo rap	EST 19XX, Interscope	
March 29	Omar Souleyman	Erbil		Mad Decent	
March 29	Puscifer, Primus, and A Perfect Circle	Sessanta E.P.P.P.		Puscifer Entertainment	
March 29	Rage	Afterlifelines		Steamhammer/SPV	
March 29	Rico Nasty and Boys Noize	Hardc0re Dr3amz			
March 29	Ride	Interplay	Shoegaze, Krautrock, synth-pop	Wichita	
March 29	Roc Marciano	Marciology	Underground hip-hop	Pimpire Records, Marci Enterprises	
March 29	Sarah Shook & the Disarmers	Revelations		Thirty Tigers, Abeyance Records	
March 29	Shabazz Palaces	Exotic Birds of Prey	Alternative hip-hop	Sub Pop	
March 29	Sheryl Crow	Evolution	Country rock, Americana	Big Machine	
March 29	Sue Foley	One Guitar Woman	Blues	Stony Plain	
March 29	Sum 41	Heaven :x: Hell	Pop-punk, alternative rock, heavy metal	Rise	
March 29	Sykamore	Through the Static		CMDSHFT	
March 29	Vial	Burnout	Indie rock, punk rock	Get Better	
March 29	While She Sleeps	Self Hell	Metalcore	Sleeps Brothers, Spinefarm	
March 30	Deadman	Genealogie der Morale			
March 31	Oliver Anthony	Hymnal of a Troubled Man's Mind	Country	Oliver Anthony	

== Second quarter ==
=== April ===
List of albums released in April 2024
Go to: January | February | March | April | May | June | July | August | September | October | November | December | Back to top
Release date	Artist	Album	Genre	Label	Ref.
April 1	Babymonster	Babymons7er	K-pop	YG	
April 1	Tomorrow X Together	Minisode 3: Tomorrow	Pop rock, dance	Big Hit, Republic	
April 3	Novelbright	Circus		Universal Sigma	
April 5	Alpha Wolf	Half Living Things		Greyscale Records, SharpTone	
April 5	Bayside	There Are Worse Things Than Being Alive		Hopeless	
April 5	Benson Boone	Fireworks & Rollerblades	Pop rock	Night Street Records, Warner	
April 5	The Black Keys	Ohio Players	Garage rock, blues rock	Easy Eye Sound, Nonesuch	
April 5	Blacktop Mojo	Pollen			
April 5	Bob Vylan	Humble as the Sun		Ghost Theatre	
April 5	Brian Cadd	Dream Train	Country		
April 5	Bryson Tiller	Bryson Tiller		RCA	
April 5	Caleb Landry Jones	Hey Gary, Hey Dawn		Sacred Bones	
April 5	Cedric Burnside	Hill Country Love	Blues	Provogue	
April 5	Cock Sparrer	Hand on Heart		Cherry Red	
April 5	Conan Gray	Found Heaven		Republic	
April 5	Dana Gavanski	Late Slap		Full Time Hobby	
April 5	Dayna Stephens	Closer Than We Think		Cellar Music Group	
April 5	Einstürzende Neubauten	Rampen (APM: Alien Pop Music)		Potomak	
April 5	Erra	Cure	Progressive metalcore, industrial metal	UNFD	
April 5	Fabiana Palladino	Fabiana Palladino	Pop, R&B	Paul Institute, XL	
April 5	Feeder	Black/Red	Alternative rock	Big Teeth Music, Townsend Music	
April 5	Hawkwind	Stories from Time and Space	Space rock	Cherry Red	
April 5	Ingested	The Tide of Death and Fractured Dreams		Metal Blade	
April 5	J. Cole	Might Delete Later	Hip-hop	Dreamville, Interscope	
April 5	Jane Weaver	Love in Constant Spectacle		Fire	
April 5	Joseph Shabason, Nicholas Krgovich, and M. Sage	Shabason, Krgovich, Sage		Idée Fixe Records	
April 5	Katie Pruitt	Mantras		Rounder	
April 5	Khruangbin	A La Sala		Dead Oceans, Night Time Stories	
April 5	Korpiklaani	Rankarumpu	Folk metal	Nuclear Blast	
April 5	The Libertines	All Quiet on the Eastern Esplanade		Casablanca, Republic	
April 5	Lillie West	If I Were a Real Man I Would Be Able to Break the Neck of a Suffering Bird		Hardly Art	
April 5	Lizzy McAlpine	Older	Indie folk, chamber pop	Columbia	
April 5	Marcus King	Mood Swings	Blues rock	American, Republic	
April 5	Mount Kimbie	The Sunset Violent	Indie rock	Warp	
April 5	Old 97's	American Primitive		ATO	
April 5	Poolblood	theres_plenty_of_music_to_go_around.zip		Next Door Records	
April 5	Still Corners	Dream Talk	Dream pop, ambient	Wrecking Light Records	
April 5	Strung Out	Dead Rebellion		Fat Wreck Chords	
April 5	Tori Kelly	Tori		Epic	
April 5	Vampire Weekend	Only God Was Above Us	Indie rock, chamber pop, neo-psychedelia	Columbia	
April 5	Vegyn	The Road to Hell Is Paved with Good Intentions	Electro-pop	PLZ Make It Ruins	
April 5	X Ambassadors	Townie		Virgin	
April 5	Yundi	Mozart: The Sonata Project - Salzburg	Classical	Warner Classics	
April 10	Fruits Zipper	New Kawaii		Kawaii Lab.	
April 12	Aaron West and the Roaring Twenties	In Lieu of Flowers		Hopeless	
April 12	Baby Rose and BadBadNotGood	Slow Burn		Secretly Canadian	
April 12	Bad Bad Hats	Bad Bad Hats		Don Giovanni	
April 12	Belmont	Liminal		Pure Noise	
April 12	Benighted	Ekbom		Season of Mist	
April 12	Blue Bendy	So Medieval	Indie rock, post-punk	The State51 Conspiracy	
April 12	Blue Öyster Cult	Ghost Stories	Hard rock, heavy metal	Frontiers	
April 12	Cosmo Sheldrake	Eye to the Ear		Tardigrade Records	
April 12	DRAM	DRAM&B			
April 12	English Teacher	This Could Be Texas		Island	
April 12	Ernest	Nashville, Tennessee		Big Loud	
April 12	Girl in Red	I'm Doing It Again Baby!	Indie pop	Columbia	
April 12	Imminence	The Black	Metalcore		
April 12	Iskwē	Nīna			
April 12	James	Yummy		Nothing But Love Music, Virgin	
April 12	Jebediah	Oiks		Cooking Vinyl	
April 12	Kelley Stoltz	La Fleur		Dandy Boy Records, Agitated Records	
April 12	Maggie Rogers	Don't Forget Me		Debay Sounds, Capitol	
April 12	Mark Knopfler	One Deep River		EMI, Blue Note	
April 12	Metro Boomin and Future	We Still Don't Trust You	R&B	Freebandz, Boominati Worldwide, Republic	
April 12	Metz	Up on Gravity Hill	Noise rock	Sub Pop	
April 12	Morgan Evans	Live at the Sydney Opera House		Warner Music Australia	
April 12	Nia Archives	Silence Is Loud		Hijinxx, Island	
April 12	Northlane	Mirror's Edge			
April 12	Shabaka	Perceive Its Beauty, Acknowledge Its Grace	Jazz, new age	Impulse!	
April 12	Sleepmakeswaves	It's Here, but I Have No Names for It		Bird's Robe Records, MGM, Dunk Records	
April 12	Still House Plants	If I Don't Make It, I Love U	Art rock	Bison Records	
April 12	Trifecta (Nick Beggs, Craig Blundell, and Adam Holzman)	The New Normal		Kscope	
April 12	Tyler Hubbard	Strong	Country	EMI Nashville	
April 12	Týr	Battle Ballads	Power metal, folk metal, Viking metal	Metal Blade	
April 12	Yoasobi	E-Side 3	J-pop	Sony Music Japan	
April 14	The Ophelias	Ribbon			
April 17	Ekko Astral	Pink Balloons		Topshelf	
April 17	@onefive	Classy Crush	J-pop, hip-hop	Avex Trax	
April 19	Anne Wilson	Rebel	Christian country	Capitol CMG	
April 19	Big Brave	A Chaos of Flowers	Doom metal, post-metal	Thrill Jockey	
April 19	Bill Frisell	Orchestras	Jazz	Blue Note	
April 19	Cadence Weapon	Rollercoaster		MNRK	
April 19	Cavalier	Different Type Time		Backwoodz Studioz	
April 19	A Certain Ratio	It All Comes Down to This		Mute	
April 19	Claire Rousay	Sentiment	Pop	Thrill Jockey	
April 19	Cloud Nothings	Final Summer		Pure Noise	
April 19	Dayseeker	Replica		Spinefarm	
April 19	Elvie Shane	Damascus		Wheelhouse	
April 19	Emma Donovan	Til My Song Is Done		Cooking Vinyl Australia	
April 19	The Ghost Inside	Searching for Solace	Metalcore, melodic hardcore	Epitaph	
April 19	Glen Campbell	Duets – Ghost on the Canvas Sessions		Surfdog, Big Machine	
April 19	High on Fire	Cometh the Storm	Stoner metal, sludge metal	MNRK Heavy	
April 19	Ian Hunter	Defiance Part 2: Fiction		Sun	
April 19	Kid Congo & the Pink Monkey Birds	That Delicious Vice		In the Red	
April 19	Local Natives	But I'll Wait for You		Loma Vista	
April 19	Lucy Rose	This Ain't the Way You Go Out		Communion	
April 19	Melvins	Tarantula Heart	Doom metal	Ipecac	
April 19	Michael Feuerstack	Eternity Mongers		Forward Music	
April 19	My Dying Bride	A Mortal Binding	Doom metal, gothic metal, death-doom	Nuclear Blast	
April 19	New Riders of the Purple Sage	Hempsteader	Country rock	Omnivore	
April 19	Paraorchestra with Brett Anderson and Charles Hazlewood	Death Songbook		World Circuit, BMG	
April 19	Pearl Jam	Dark Matter	Alternative rock, hard rock	Monkeywrench, Republic	
April 19	Praying Mantis	Defiance		Frontiers	
April 19	SeeYouSpaceCowboy	Coup de Grâce		Pure Noise	
April 19	Slum Village	Fun		Ne'Astra Music, Virgin	
April 19	T Bone Burnett	The Other Side	Country blues	Verve	
April 19	Taylor Swift	The Tortured Poets Department	Synth-pop, chamber pop	Republic	
April 19	Tei Shi	Valerie			
April 19	UB40	UB45			
April 19	Yunchan Lim	Chopin: Études, Opp. 10 & 25	Classical	Decca	
April 23	Yuqi	Yuq1	Dance, hip-hop, R&B	Cube, Kakao	
April 24	Bladee	Cold Visions	Hip-hop	Trash Island	
April 24	The Rifles	Love Your Neighbour		Right Hook Recordings	
April 25	Tara Jane O'Neil	The Cool Cloud of Okayness		Orindal Records	
April 26	Accept	Humanoid		Napalm	
April 26	Alien Ant Farm	Mantras	Alternative rock	Alien Ant Farm	
April 26	Anitta	Funk Generation	Brazilian funk	Republic, Universal Music Latin	
April 26	Black Tusk	The Way Forward	Sludge metal, hardcore punk, stoner metal	Season of Mist	
April 26	Charley Crockett	$10 Cowboy	Neotraditional country	Son of Davy, Thirty Tigers	
April 26	Corridor	Mimi		Sub Pop	
April 26	Darkthrone	It Beckons Us All...		Peaceville	
April 26	Deicide	Banished by Sin	Death metal	Reigning Phoenix	
April 26	Ellis	No Place That Feels Like			
April 26	Full of Hell	Coagulated Bliss	Grindcore	Closed Casket Activities	
April 26	Greg Saunier	We Sang, Therefore We Were	Progressive rock	Joyful Noise	
April 26	Hovvdy	Hovvdy	Pop	Arts & Crafts	
April 26	Iron & Wine	Light Verse		Sub Pop	
April 26	Judith Hill	Letters from a Black Widow		Regime Music Group	
April 26	Justice	Hyperdrama	French house, synthwave	Ed Banger, Because	
April 26	Kyp Harness	Kick the Dust			
April 26	Kyshona	Legacy			
April 26	Lost Dog Street Band	Survived		Lost Dog Street Band, Thirty Tigers	
April 26	MacKenzie Porter	Nobody's Born with a Broken Heart	Country	Big Loud	
April 26	Neil Young and Crazy Horse	Fuckin' Up	Rock, garage rock	The Other Shoe Productions, Inc., Reprise	
April 26	Owen	The Falls of Sioux	Indie folk	Polyvinyl	
April 26	PartyNextDoor	PartyNextDoor 4	Alternative R&B, downtempo	OVO, Santa Anna Label Group	
April 26	Pet Shop Boys	Nonetheless		x2, Parlophone	
April 26	Regurgitator	Invader		Valve	
April 26	Sega Bodega	Dennis		ambient tweets	
April 26	Six Organs of Admittance	Time Is Glass		Drag City	
April 26	St. Vincent	All Born Screaming		Total Pleasure Records, VMG	
April 26	Thom Yorke	Confidenza		XL	
April 26	The Zutons	The Big Decider		Icepop	
April 29	Ive	Ive Switch		Starship	

=== May ===
List of albums released in May 2024
Go to: January | February | March | April | May | June | July | August | September | October | November | December | Back to top
Release date	Artist	Album	Genre	Label	Ref.
May 1	The Deep Dark Woods	Broadside Ballads Vol. III		Victory Pool	
May 3	4Batz	U Made Me a St4r	R&B	Gamma	
May 3	Better Than Ezra	Super Magick		Round Hill	
May 3	Broadcast	Spell Blanket		Warp	
May 3	Camera Obscura	Look to the East, Look to the West	Indie pop	Merge	
May 3	Charlotte Day Wilson	Cyan Blue		Stone Woman Music, XL	
May 3	Dirtyphonics	Magnetic		Monstercat	
May 3	Dua Lipa	Radical Optimism	Dance-pop, neo-psychedelia, electropop	Warner	
May 3	Frank Turner	Undefeated		Xtra Mile	
May 3	Ibibio Sound Machine	Pull the Rope		Merge	
May 3	Jessica Pratt	Here in the Pitch	Baroque pop	Mexican Summer	
May 3	John Carpenter	Lost Themes IV: Noir		Sacred Bones	
May 3	Jon McKiel	Hex	Indie folk, neo-psychedelia	You've Changed	
May 3	Kamasi Washington	Fearless Movement		Young	
May 3	Kavus Torabi	The Banishing	Psychedelic rock, dream pop	Believers Roast	
May 3	The Lemon Twigs	A Dream Is All We Know	Power pop	Captured Tracks	
May 3	Mdou Moctar	Funeral for Justice	Rock	Matador	
May 3	P.O.D.	Veritas	Nu metal	Mascot	
May 3	Rachel Chinouriri	What a Devastating Turn of Events	Indie rock	Parlophone	
May 3	Roots Architects	From Then 'Til Now		Fruits Records	
May 3	Sia	Reasonable Woman	Pop	Monkey Puzzle, Atlantic	
May 3	Snarls	With Love		Take This to Heart	
May 3	Tenille Arts	To Be Honest		Dreamcatcher Artists	
May 3	Willow	Empathogen	Jazz, progressive rock	Three Six Zero, gamma	
May 7	Doh Kyung-soo	Blossom	K-pop, R&B	Company Soosoo	
May 8	Kep1er	Kep1going	J-pop	WakeOne, Ariola Japan	
May 8	Momoiro Clover Z	Idola			
May 8	My First Story	The Crown		Intact Records	
May 8	TripleS	Assemble24		ModHaus, Kakao	
May 9	Ryan Castro	El Cantante del Ghetto		Sony Music Latin	
May 10	A. G. Cook	Britpop	Electronic	New Alias	
May 10	Abigail Lapell	Anniversary		Outside	
May 10	Amen Dunes	Death Jokes		Sub Pop	
May 10	Angus & Julia Stone	Cape Forestier		Sony Music Australia	
May 10	Arab Strap	I'm Totally Fine with It Don't Give a Fuck Anymore	Pop, indie rock	Rock Action	
May 10	Bibi Club	Feu de garde		Secret City	
May 10	Big Special	Postindustrial Hometown Blues	Punk, soul, blues	SO Recordings	
May 10	The Chainsmokers	No Hard Feelings		Disruptor, Columbia	
May 10	Chick Corea and Béla Fleck	Remembrance		Thirty Tigers	
May 10	Chief Keef	Almighty So 2		43B	
May 10	Conway the Machine	Slant Face Killah		Drumwork, Empire	
May 10	Dehd	Poetry		Fat Possum	
May 10	Ghostface Killah	Set the Tone (Guns & Roses)	Hip-hop	Mass Appeal	
May 10	Grupo Frontera	Jugando a Que No Pasa Nada		Grupo Frontera	
May 10	Gunna	One of Wun		YSL, 300	
May 10	Hot Water Music	Vows		Equal Vision	
May 10	How to Dress Well	I Am Toward You		Sargent House	
May 10	Iglooghost	Tidal Memory Exo		LuckyMe	
May 10	Jim White and Marisa Anderson	Swallowtail	Abstract, folk	Thrill Jockey	
May 10	Jordan Rakei	The Loop		Decca	
May 10	Kings of Leon	Can We Please Have Fun	Indie rock, alternative rock, garage rock	LoveTap Records, Capitol	
May 10	Knocked Loose	You Won't Go Before You're Supposed To	Metalcore, hardcore punk	Pure Noise	
May 10	Like Moths to Flames	The Cycles of Trying to Cope	Metalcore	UNFD	
May 10	Mary Lattimore and Walt McClements	Rain on the Road		Thrill Jockey	
May 10	Mick Harvey	Five Ways to Say Goodbye		Mute	
May 10	Powerman 5000	Abandon Ship	Industrial metal	Cleopatra	
May 10	Les Savy Fav	Oui, LSF		Les Savy Fav, Frenchkiss, the Orchard	
May 10	Scotty McCreery	Rise & Fall	Country	Triple Tigers	
May 10	Sebastian Bach	Child Within the Man	Heavy metal, hard rock	Reigning Phoenix	
May 10	Shannon and the Clams	The Moon Is in the Wrong Place		Easy Eye Sound	
May 10	Six Feet Under	Killing for Revenge	Death metal	Metal Blade	
May 10	Sublime with Rome	Sublime with Rome			
May 10	The Tangent	To Follow Polaris		Inside Out	
May 10	Tom Skinner	Voices of Bishara Live at "Mu"		International Anthem	
May 10	Troy Cassar-Daley	Between the Fires	Country	Sony Music Australia	
May 10	Unleash the Archers	Phantoma	Power metal	Napalm	
May 10	Yaya Bey	Ten Fold	R&B	Big Dada	
May 13	Enhypen	Memorabilia	K-pop	Belift Lab	
May 13	Zerobaseone	You Had Me at Hello	K-pop	WakeOne	
May 17	A Boogie wit da Hoodie	Better Off Alone		Atlantic, Highbridge the Label	
May 17	The Avett Brothers	The Avett Brothers	Folk, alternative country, Americana	American, Thirty Tigers	
May 17	Beth Gibbons	Lives Outgrown	Chamber pop	Domino	
May 17	Billie Eilish	Hit Me Hard and Soft	Alt-pop	Darkroom, Interscope	
May 17	Bright Light Bright Light	Enjoy Youth	Dance	YSKWN! Records	
May 17	Cage the Elephant	Neon Pill		RCA	
May 17	Collective Soul	Here to Eternity		Fuzze-Flex Records	
May 17	Crumb	Amama	Psychedelic pop, alternative rock	Crumb Records	
May 17	The Dave Foster Band	Maybe They'll Come Back for Us		English Electric Recordings	
May 17	Dog Party	Dangerous		Sneak Dog Records	
May 17	Don McLean	American Boys			
May 17	Elvellon	Ascending in Synergy	Symphonic metal	Napalm	
May 17	Ghostly Kisses	Darkroom		Akira Records	
May 17	Guster	Ooh La La		Ocho Mule Records	
May 17	Intervals	Memory Palace		Intervals	
May 17	Isobel Campbell	Bow to Love		Cooking Vinyl	
May 17	Jack Savoretti	Miss Italia			
May 17	John Oates	Reunion			
May 17	Joywave	Permanent Pleasure		Cultco Music, Hollywood	
May 17	Kate Hudson	Glorious			
May 17	Kerry King	From Hell I Rise	Thrash metal	Reigning Phoenix	
May 17	Lip Critic	Hex Dealer	Electro-punk	Partisan	
May 17	Little Feat	Sam's Place	Blues	Hot Tomato Records	
May 17	Mach-Hommy	#Richaxxhaitian	Hip-hop	Mach-Hommy	
May 17	Marty Friedman	Drama		Frontiers	
May 17	New Kids on the Block	Still Kids	Pop	BMG	
May 17	of Montreal	Lady on the Cusp		Polyvinyl	
May 17	One Step Closer	All You Embrace		Run for Cover	
May 17	Pallbearer	Mind Burns Alive	Doom metal	Nuclear Blast	
May 17	Rachael Sage	Another Side		MPress Records	
May 17	Rapsody	Please Don't Cry	Hip-hop	Jamla Records, Roc Nation	
May 17	Shellac	To All Trains	Math rock, post-punk	Touch and Go	
May 17	Slash	Orgy of the Damned	Blues	Gibson	
May 17	Various artists	Everyone's Getting Involved: A Tribute to Talking Heads' Stop Making Sense		A24 Music	
May 17	Zayn	Room Under the Stairs	Soft rock, soul, country	Mercury, Republic	
May 19	Sharp Pins	Radio DDR	Power pop, jangle pop	Hallogallo	
May 23	Rotting Christ	Pro Xristou	Melodic black metal	Season of Mist	
May 24	Andrew Bird, Alan Hampton, and Ted Poor	Sunday Morning Put-On	Traditional pop, vocal jazz	Loma Vista	
May 24	Bass Communion	The Itself of Itself	Ambient, drone, noise	Lumberton Trading Company	
May 24	Bring Me the Horizon	Post Human: Nex Gen	Post-hardcore, pop-punk, hyperpop	Sony, RCA	
May 24	David Myles	Devil Talking		Little Tiny Records, turtlemusik	
May 24	DIIV	Frog in Boiling Water	Shoegaze	Fantasy	
May 24	Finom	Not God		Joyful Noise	
May 24	Gastr del Sol	We Have Dozens of Titles		Drag City	
May 24	Kiesza	Dancing and Crying: Vol 1			
May 24	Lenny Kravitz	Blue Electric Light		Roxie Records, BMG	
May 24	La Luz	News of the Universe		Sub Pop	
May 24	Lynne Hanson	Just a Poet		Panda Cave Records	
May 24	Machinedrum	3for82		Ninja Tune	
May 24	Nathy Peluso	Grasa	Latin hip-hop	Sony Latin, 5020	
May 24	Old Man Luedecke	She Told Me Where to Go		Outside	
May 24	Paul Weller	66		Solid Bond, Polydor	
May 24	RM	Right Place, Wrong Person		Big Hit	
May 24	Say Anything	...Is Committed	Alternative rock, emo	Dine Alone	
May 24	Shenseea	Never Gets Late Here		Interscope	
May 24	Tiny Habits	All for Something		Mom + Pop	
May 24	Twenty One Pilots	Clancy	Alternative rock, synth-pop, emo rap	Fueled by Ramen, Elektra	
May 24	Vince Staples	Dark Times	West Coast hip-hop	Def Jam	
May 24	Wallows	Model	Indie pop, indie rock	Atlantic	
May 27	Aespa	Armageddon	Pop	SM, Kakao, Warner	
May 28	Beak	>>>>		Temporary Residence Limited	
May 29	Ringo Sheena	Carnival	Jazz	EMI	
May 31	+/-	Further Afield		Ernest Jenning	
May 31	Another Michael	Pick Me Up, Turn Me Upside Down		Run for Cover	
May 31	Arooj Aftab	Night Reign	Pakistani folk, bebop jazz	Verve	
May 31	Artms	DALL	K-pop	Modhaus	
May 31	Ateez	Golden Hour: Part.1	K-pop	KQ Entertainment, RCA	
May 31	Ayra Starr	The Year I Turned 21	Afrobeats, R&B, pop	Mavin	
May 31	Bad Omens	Concrete Jungle (The OST)		Sumerian	
May 31	Bat for Lashes	The Dream of Delphi		Mercury KX	
May 31	Becky Hill	Believe Me Now?	Dance, pop	Polydor, Eko Records	
May 31	Ben Platt	Honeymind		Interscope	
May 31	Bernard Butler	Good Grief		355 Recordings	
May 31	Bonnie McKee	Hot City	Pop	Bonnie McKee	
May 31	Buffalo Tom	Jump Rope		Scrawny Records	
May 31	Crowded House	Gravity Stairs		Lester Records, BMG	
May 31	Tha Dogg Pound	W.A.W.G. (We All We Got)	West Coast hip-hop, gangsta rap	Death Row	
May 31	The Hope Conspiracy	Tools of Oppression / Rule by Deception		Deathwish Inc.	
May 31	Leigh-Anne	No Hard Feelings	R&B	Warner	
May 31	The Marías	Submarine	Dream pop, indie pop	Nice Life, Atlantic	
May 31	Maya Hawke	Chaos Angel		Mom + Pop	
May 31	Richard Hawley	In This City They Call You Love		BMG	
May 31	Richard Thompson	Ship to Shore	British folk, British folk rock	New West	
May 31	RXKNephew	Till I'm Dead 2		New Breed Trapper	
May 31	Shaboozey	Where I've Been, Isn't Where I'm Going	Country, hip-hop	American Dogwood, Empire	
May 31	Suho	1 to 3	Rock	SM	
May 31	Swamp Dogg	Blackgrass: From West Virginia to 125th St		Oh Boy	
May 31	Terri Clark	Terri Clark: Take Two	Country	Mercury Nashville, UMe	
May 31	Thou	Umbilical	Sludge metal, doom metal	Sacred Bones	
May 31	Tom Walker	I Am		Relentless	
May 31	Willie Nelson	The Border	Country	Legacy, Sony Music	

=== June ===
List of albums released in June 2024
Go to: January | February | March | April | May | June | July | August | September | October | November | December | Back to top
Release date	Artist	Album	Genre	Label	Ref.
June 3	Kep1er	Kep1going On	K-pop	WakeOne, Swing	
June 4	Shiori Tamai	Colors		King Japan	
June 7	Actress	Statik		Smalltown Supersound	
June 7	Alfie Templeman	Radiosoul	Indie pop	Chess Club Records	
June 7	Apocalyptica	Plays Metallica, Vol. 2		Throwdown Entertainment	
June 7	Atarashii Gakko!	AG! Calling		88rising	
June 7	Aurora	What Happened to the Heart?	Indie pop, disco	Decca, Glassnote, Petroleum	
June 7	Bloomsday	Heart of the Artichoke		Bayonet Records	
June 7	Bon Jovi	Forever	Rock	EMI, Island	
June 7	Bonny Light Horseman	Keep Me on Your Mind/See You Free	Folk	Jagjaguwar	
June 7	Carly Pearce	Hummingbird	Country, bluegrass	Big Machine	
June 7	Casey MQ	Later That Day, the Day Before, or the Day Before That		Ghostly International	
June 7	Charli XCX	Brat	Hyperpop, dance	Atlantic	
June 7	Eels	Eels Time!		E Works, PIAS	
June 7	Frankie Bird	Twenty Something			
June 7	The Game and various artists	Time		STB Entertainment	
June 7	Goat Girl	Below the Waste		Rough Trade	
June 7	Immortal Disfigurement	King			
June 7	Joey Valence & Brae	No Hands	Hip-hop, drum and bass	JVB Records	
June 7	Kaytranada	Timeless		RCA	
June 7	Meghan Trainor	Timeless	Doo-wop, bubblegum pop	Epic	
June 7	NxWorries	Why Lawd?		Stones Throw	
June 7	The Omnific	The Law of Augmenting Returns		Wild Thing Records	
June 7	Pedro the Lion	Santa Cruz	Indie rock, electronic	Polyvinyl	
June 7	Peggy Gou	I Hear You	Dance-pop	XL	
June 7	Seasick Steve	A Trip a Stumble a Fall Down on Your Knees	Blues rock, country blues	SO Recordings	
June 7	Ski Mask the Slump God	11th Dimension		Victor Victor Worldwide, Republic	
June 7	Strand of Oaks	Miracle Focus		Western Vinyl	
June 7	Swim Deep	There's a Big Star Outside...		Submarine Cat Records	
June 7	Tems	Born in the Wild	R&B	RCA, Since '93	
June 7	Tracy Lawrence	Out Here in It	Country	Four17	
June 14	Axel Rudi Pell	Risen Symbol		Steamhammer/SPV	
June 14	Black Country Communion	V	Hard rock, blues rock	J&R Adventures	
June 14	Caroline Shaw and So Percussion	Rectangles and Circumstance		Nonesuch	
June 14	Cola	The Gloss	Alternative rock, post-punk	Fire Talk Records	
June 14	The Decemberists	As It Ever Was, So It Will Be Again		Yabb Records, Thirty Tigers	
June 14	Dirty Three	Love Changes Everything	Post-rock	Drag City	
June 14	Don Toliver	Hardstone Psycho	Trap	Cactus Jack, Atlantic	
June 14	The Early November	The Early November		Pure Noise	
June 14	King Promise	True to Self	Highlife, Afrobeats	5K Records Limited, Sony Music UK	
June 14	Florrie	The Lost Ones	Synth-pop, pop	Xenomania, BMG	
June 14	Fu Manchu	The Return of Tomorrow		At the Dojo Records	
June 14	Hermanos Gutiérrez	Sonido Cósmico		Easy Eye Sound	
June 14	Hockey Dad	Rebuild Repeat	Indie rock	Farmer & the Owl, BMG	
June 14	Infinity Song	Metamorphosis Complete		Roc Nation	
June 14	John Cale	Poptical Illusion	Electronic	Double Six, Domino	
June 14	John Grant	The Art of the Lie		Bella Union	
June 14	Julie Christmas	Ridiculous and Full of Blood		Red Creek Recordings	
June 14	Kneecap	Fine Art	Hip-hop, electronic	Heavenly	
June 14	Lalah Hathaway	Vantablack	R&B	Hathaway Entertainment	
June 14	Lindsey Stirling	Duality	EDM, classical crossover	Concord, Lindseystomp	
June 14	Luke Combs	Fathers & Sons	Country	Seven Ridges Records, Columbia Nashville	
June 14	Moby	Always Centered at Night	Electronic	Always Centered at Night, Mute	
June 14	Moneybagg Yo	Speak Now		CMG, N-Less, Interscope	
June 14	μ-Ziq	Grush		Planet Mu	
June 14	Normani	Dopamine	R&B, pop	RCA	
June 14	RJD2	Visions Out of Limelight		RJ's Electrical Connections	
June 14	Sam Morton	Daffodils & Dirt		XL	
June 14	Sea Girls	Midnight Butterflies		Alt. Records, Believe	
June 14	SG Lewis and Tove Lo	Heat		Pretty Swede Records	
June 14	Suicideboys	New World Depression	Southern hip-hop, horrorcore	G59 Records	
June 14	This Is Lorelei	Box for Buddy, Box for Star	Indie rock	Double Double Whammy	
June 14	Veps	Dedicated To:		Miktam Records, Universal Music	
June 17	Riize	Riizing		SM	
June 20	Peso Pluma	Éxodo		Double P Records	
June 21	Alcest	Les Chants de l'Aurore	Blackgaze, post-black metal	Nuclear Blast	
June 21	Celeigh Cardinal	Boundless Possibilities			
June 21	The Dangerous Summer	Gravity		Rude	
June 21	Daryl Hall	D		Virgin	
June 21	Earthtone9	In Resonance Nexus		Candlelight	
June 21	Gracie Abrams	The Secret of Us	Pop	Interscope	
June 21	The Greeting Committee	Everyone's Gone and I Know I'm the Cause			
June 21	Ionnalee	Blund		TWIMC	
June 21	Ionnalee	Close Your Eyes		TWIMC	
June 21	Islands	What Occurs		ELF Records	
June 21	Kate Nash	9 Sad Symphonies		Kill Rock Stars	
June 21	Kehlani	Crash	R&B	Atlantic	
June 21	Kittie	Fire	Heavy metal, groove metal	Sumerian	
June 21	Kronos Quartet	Outer Spaceways Incorporated	Jazz	Red Hot	
June 21	Kygo	Kygo	Dance-pop, tropical house, progressive house	RCA	
June 21	Lake Street Dive	Good Together		Fantasy	
June 21	Linda Thompson	Proxy Music		StorySound Records	
June 21	Lola Young	This Wasn't Meant for You Anyway		Island	
June 21	The Mysterines	Afraid of Tomorrows	Rock	Fiction	
June 21	O.	WeirdOs		Speedy Wunderground	
June 21	Pond	Stung!	Psychedelic rock, psychedelic pop, neo-psychedelia	Spinning Top Records	
June 21	Seven Spires	A Fortress Called Home	Symphonic metal	Frontiers Music	
June 21	Sheppard	Zora		Empire of Song	
June 21	The Story So Far	I Want to Disappear	Pop-punk	Pure Noise	
June 21	Sumac	The Healer	Avant-garde metal	Thrill Jockey	
June 21	Wage War	Stigma	Metalcore	Fearless	
June 26	Cornelius	Ethereal Essence		Warner Music Japan	
June 26	B.D.U	Wishpool		Orca Music	
June 28	Anvil	One and Only		AFM	
June 28	Bilmuri	American Motor Sports		Columbia	
June 28	Camila Cabello	C,XOXO	Pop	Interscope, Geffen	
June 28	Cupcakke	Dauntless Manifesto	Hip-hop	Cupcakke	
June 28	Dave Blunts	Well Dude Here's My Thing		Listen to the Kids	
June 28	The Felice Brothers	Valley of Abandoned Songs		Million Stars Records	
June 28	The Folk Implosion	Walk Thru Me		Joyful Noise	
June 28	Frances Forever	Lockjaw			
June 28	Guided by Voices	Strut of Kings	Indie rock, progressive rock, power pop	Rockathon Records, Guided by Voices, Inc.	
June 28	Headie One	The Last One	British hip-hop, UK drill	Columbia, Sony	
June 28	Hiatus Kaiyote	Love Heart Cheat Code	Neo soul, future soul, psychedelic	Brainfeeder, Ninja Tune	
June 28	Imagine Dragons	Loom		Kidinakorner, Interscope	
June 28	James Blake and Lil Yachty	Bad Cameo		Quality Control, Motown, Republic	
June 28	Johnny Cash	Songwriter	Country	Mercury Nashville	
June 28	Liana Flores	Flower of the Soul	Bossa nova, folk-pop	Verve, Fiction	
June 28	Loma	How Will I Live Without a Body?		Sub Pop	
June 28	Lucky Daye	Algorithm	R&B	Keep Cool, RCA	
June 28	Lupe Fiasco	Samurai	Jazz rap	1st & 15th, Thirty Tigers	
June 28	Mabe Fratti	Sentir Que No Sabes		Unheard of Hope	
June 28	Madeleine Peyroux	Let's Walk	Vocal jazz	Thirty Tigers	
June 28	Marsha Ambrosius	Casablanco	R&B, hip-hop	Aftermath, Interscope	
June 28	Megan Thee Stallion	Megan		Hot Girl Productions	
June 28	Nathaniel Rateliff & the Night Sweats	South of Here	Soul, rock	Stax	
June 28	Neil Young and Crazy Horse	Early Daze	Hard rock, country rock	Reprise	
June 28	Nothing More	Carnal		Better Noise	
June 28	Nothing,Nowhere	Hell or Highwater		Reapers Realm Records	
June 28	Omar Apollo	God Said No		Warner	
June 28	Previous Industries	Service Merchandise		Merge	
June 28	RBX	Hibernation Shivers			
June 28	Redd Kross	Redd Kross	Alternative rock	In the Red	
June 28	Robert Jon & the Wreck	Red Moon Rising		Journeyman Records	
June 28	Scene Queen	Hot Singles in Your Area	Metalcore, hyperpop	Hopeless	
June 28	Shackleton and Six Organs of Admittance	Jinxed by Being		Drag City	
June 28	The Streets	Fabric Presents the Streets			
June 28	The Warning	Keep Me Fed	Alternative rock	Lava, Republic	
June 28	Washed Out	Notes from a Quiet Life		Sub Pop	

== Third quarter ==
=== July ===
List of albums released in July 2024
Go to: January | February | March | April | May | June | July | August | September | October | November | December | Back to top
Release date	Artist	Album	Genre	Label	Ref.
July 1	STAYC	Metamorphic		High Up	
July 3	All(H)Ours	Witness		Eden Entertainment	
July 3	Masaki Suda	Spin		Epic Japan	
July 4	Zach Bryan	The Great American Bar Scene		Belting Bronco, Warner	
July 5	Eves Karydas	Burnt Tapes		Zeitgeist Records	
July 5	Fink	Beauty in Your Wake		R'Coup'D	
July 5	JessB	Feels Like Home		SayLess Records, Warner Music Australia	
July 5	Kasabian	Happenings		Columbia	
July 5	Norma Winstone and Kit Downes	Outpost of Dreams	Jazz	ECM	
July 5	Visions of Atlantis	Pirates II – Armada	Symphonic metal, power metal, pirate metal	Napalm	
July 5	Vulvodynia	Entabeni		Unique Leader Records	
July 6	Sault	Acts of Faith	Christian music, R&B	Forever Living Originals	
July 7	Molly Nilsson	Un-American Activities	Synth-pop	Night School	
July 8	(G)I-dle	I Sway		Cube	
July 10	Ado	Zanmu		Virgin	
July 10	Rema	Heis	Afrobeats	Jonzing World, Mavin, Interscope	
July 11	Action Bronson	Johann Sebastian Bachlava the Doctor	East Coast hip-hop		
July 12	Ani DiFranco	Unprecedented Sh!t		Righteous Babe	
July 12	Berwyn	Who Am I		Columbia	
July 12	Billy Strings	Live Vol. 1	Bluegrass	Reprise	
July 12	Cassadee Pope	Hereditary		Awake Music	
July 12	Cassandra Jenkins	My Light, My Destroyer	Pop	Dead Oceans	
July 12	Cat Burns	Early Twenties	Pop	Since '93, RCA	
July 12	Cigarettes After Sex	X's	Ambient pop, shoegaze	Partisan	
July 12	Clairo	Charm	Soft rock, jazz, psychedelic folk	Clairo Records	
July 12	Common and Pete Rock	The Auditorium Vol. 1	Hip-hop	Loma Vista	
July 12	Donovan Woods	Things Were Never Good If They're Not Good Now		End Times Music	
July 12	Eminem	The Death of Slim Shady (Coup de Grâce)	Hip-hop	Shady, Aftermath, Interscope	
July 12	Enhypen	Romance: Untold	Synth-pop, R&B	Belift Lab, Genie	
July 12	Graphic Nature	Who Are You When No One Is Watching?		Rude	
July 12	Griff	Vertigo	Synth-pop	Warner	
July 12	Hardy	Quit!!	Country, post-grunge, nu metal	Big Loud Rock, Mercury, Republic	
July 12	In Hearts Wake	Incarnation	Metalcore	UNFD	
July 12	Joe Goddard	Harmonics			
July 12	John Summit	Comfort in Chaos		Darkroom, Experts Only	
July 12	Johnny Blue Skies	Passage du Desir		High Top Mountain Records	
July 12	Macseal	Permanent Repeat		Counter Intuitive	
July 12	Megan Moroney	Am I Okay?	Country	Sony Music, Columbia	
July 12	Mr. Big	Ten			
July 12	OneRepublic	Artificial Paradise	Pop	Mosley, Interscope	
July 12	Phish	Evolve		JEMP	
July 12	Remi Wolf	Big Ideas	Pop	Island	
July 12	Speed	Only One Mode	Hardcore punk	Last Ride Records, Flatspot Records	
July 12	Tink	Winter's Diary 5	R&B	Winter's Diary Records, Empire Distribution	
July 12	Travis	L.A. Times	Alternative rock, indie rock, folk	BMG, Red Telephone Box	
July 12	Windwaker	Hyperviolence		Cooking Vinyl Australia, Fearless	
July 19	Al Di Meola	Twentyfour		earMusic	
July 19	Beachwood Sparks	Across the River of Stars	Country rock	Curation Records	
July 19	Blxst	I'll Always Come Find You		Red Bull, Evgle LLC	
July 19	Los Campesinos!	All Hell		Heart Swells	
July 19	Childish Gambino	Bando Stone & the New World	Alternative R&B, pop, hip-hop	RCA	
July 19	Deep Purple	=1		earMusic	
July 19	Denzel Curry	King of the Mischievous South Vol. 2	Memphis rap, Southern hip-hop	PH Recordings, Loma Vista	
July 19	Glass Animals	I Love You So F***ing Much		Polydor	
July 19	Gorgon City	Reverie		Realm Records, Astralwerks	
July 19	Highly Suspect	As Above, So Below		Roadrunner, 300, Elektra	
July 19	Jack White	No Name	Garage rock, blues rock, punk blues	Third Man	
July 19	JB Dunckel	Möbius Morphosis		Warner Classics	
July 19	Jimin	Muse		Big Hit	
July 19	Orange Goblin	Science, Not Fiction	Heavy metal, stoner metal, blues rock	Peaceville	
July 19	Role Model	Kansas Anymore	Indie pop	Interscope	
July 19	Soft Play	Heavy Jelly	Punk metal	BMG	
July 19	Stray Kids	Ate	Hip-hop, drum and bass	JYP, Republic	
July 19	Various artists	Twisters: The Album	Country	Atlantic	
July 24	Official Hige Dandism	Rejoice		Pony Canyon, Irori	
July 26
July 26	Blur	Live at Wembley Stadium	Britpop	Parlophone	
July 26	Crack Cloud	Red Mile		Jagjaguwar	
July 26	Cults	To the Ghosts	Synth-pop, art pop	Imperial	
July 26	Empire of the Sun	Ask That God		EMI Music Australia, Capitol	
July 26	Ice Spice	Y2K!	Drill, hip-hop, jersey club	10K, Capitol	
July 26	Joshua Bassett	The Golden Years	Folk, disco-pop		
July 26	Michael Giacchino	Exotic Themes for the Silver Screen – Volume 1		Mutant	
July 26	Mustard	Faith of a Mustard Seed	Hip-hop	10 Summers Records, BMG	
July 26	Pat Metheny	MoonDial		BG Records	
July 26	Porter Robinson	Smile! :D	Electropop	Mom + Pop	
July 26	Powerwolf	Wake Up the Wicked	Power metal, heavy metal	Napalm	
July 26	Rakim	God's Network: Reb7rth			
July 26	The Red Clay Strays	Made by These Moments		RCA	
July 26	Sinai Vessel	I Sing		Keeled Scales	
July 26	State Faults	Children of the Moon		Deathwish Inc.	
July 26	A Wake in Providence	I Write to You, My Darling Decay	Deathcore, symphonic black metal	Unique Leader Records	
July 26	Wand	Vertigo	Rock	Drag City	
July 31	ExWhyZ	Sweet & Sour	J-pop	Universal Music Japan	

=== August ===
List of albums released in August 2024
Go to: January | February | March | April | May | June | July | August | September | October | November | December | Back to top
Release date	Artist	Album	Genre	Label	Ref.
August 1	JPEGMafia	I Lay Down My Life for You		AWAL	
August 2	Allday	The Necklace		Dew Process	
August 2	Christine Anu	Waku: Minaral a Minalay		Australian Broadcasting Corporation	
August 2	David Lynch and Chrystabell	Cellophane Memories		Sacred Bones	
August 2	Dune Rats	If It Sucks, Turn It Up		Ratbag Records, BMG	
August 2	Ella Langley	Hungover	Country	Sawgod, Columbia	
August 2	Fanning Dempsey National Park	The Deluge		Dew Process	
August 2	Gryffin	Pulse		Darkroom Records, Interscope, Geffen	
August 2	I Love Your Lifestyle	Summerland (Torpa or Nothing)		Counter Intuitive	
August 2	Joe Ely	Driven to Drive		Rack 'Em Records, Thirty Tigers	
August 2	Khalid	Sincere	R&B, pop	RCA	
August 2	Maren Morris	Intermission	Pop	Columbia	
August 2	Michael & the Mighty Midnight Revival	Songs for Sinners & Saints	Gospel, Southern hip-hop	VLNS, Loma Vista	
August 2	A Night in Texas	Digital Apocalypse		Unique Leader Records	
August 2	Pixey	Million Dollar Baby	Indie pop, synth-pop, alternative pop	Chess Club Records	
August 2	Ruel	Adaptations		Giant Music	
August 2	The Smashing Pumpkins	Aghori Mhori Mei	Progressive rock, alternative rock, heavy metal	Martha's Music, Thirty Tigers	
August 2	Tones and I	Beautifully Ordinary		Bad Batch Records	
August 2	Why?	The Well I Fell Into	Indie rock	Waterlines Records	
August 2	X	Smoke & Fiction	Punk rock	Fat Possum	
August 3	Parannoul	Sky Hundred	Shoegaze, noise pop	Poclanos	
August 3	¥$	Vultures 2		YZY	
August 5	Everyone Asked About You	Never Leave		The Numero Group	
August 7	Pasocom Music Club	Love Flutter			
August 9	3%	Kill the Dead		1788 Records, VMG	
August 9	Amy Shark	Sunday Sadness		Sony Music Australia	
August 9	And So I Watch You from Afar	Megafauna		Velocity	
August 9	Beabadoobee	This Is How Tomorrow Moves	Indie rock	Dirty Hit	
August 9	Bill Wyman	Drive My Car			
August 9	Chlöe	Trouble in Paradise	Alternative R&B, pop, Afro fusion	Parkwood, Columbia	
August 9	Cloud Cult	Alchemy Creek		Earthology	
August 9	Destroy Boys	Funeral Soundtrack No. 4	Punk rock	Hopeless	
August 9	Fucked Up	Another Day		Fucked Up	
August 9	HammerFall	Avenge the Fallen		Nuclear Blast	
August 9	J Balvin	Rayo	Reggaeton	Capitol	
August 9	King Gizzard & the Lizard Wizard	Flight b741	Blues rock	P(Doom) Records	
August 9	Latto	Sugar Honey Iced Tea	Hip-hop	RCA	
August 9	Logic	Ultra 85	Hip-hop	BobbyBoy Records, Three Oh One Productions, BMG	
August 9	Louis Cole with Metropole Orkest	Nothing	Electronic, jazz, funk	Brainfeeder	
August 9	Milton Nascimento and Esperanza Spalding	Milton + Esperanza	Jazz	Concord	
August 9	Mushroomhead	Call the Devil	Alternative metal, avant-garde metal	Napalm	
August 9	Niki	Buzz	Alternative pop, folk-pop	88rising	
August 9	Osees	Sorcs 80		Castle Face	
August 9	Polo G	Hood Poet		Columbia	
August 9	Ravyn Lenae	Bird's Eye	R&B	Atlantic	
August 9	Ryuichi Sakamoto	Opus		Milan	
August 9	Twin Atlantic	Meltdown		Staple Diet	
August 16	Charly Bliss	Forever		Lucky Number Music	
August 16	Dark Tranquillity	Endtime Signals	Melodic death metal	Century Media	
August 16	Devon Allman	Miami Moon		Create Records	
August 16	Falling in Reverse	Popular Monster		Epitaph	
August 16	Foster the People	Paradise State of Mind		Atlantic	
August 16	Hamish Hawk	A Firmer Hand	Sophisti-pop, post-punk, art rock	So Recordings, Fierce Panda	
August 16	Horse Jumper of Love	Disaster Trick		Run for Cover	
August 16	Left to Suffer	Leap of Death	Deathcore, metalcore, nu metal		
August 16	Mark Ambor	Rockwood		Hundred Days Records	
August 16	Morgan Wade	Obsessed	Country	Ladylike Records, Sony Music	
August 16	Pom Poko	Champion		Bella Union	
August 16	Post Malone	F-1 Trillion	Country	Republic, Mercury	
August 16	Ray LaMontagne	Long Way Home		Liula Records	
August 16	Rosie Lowe	Lover, Other		Blue Flowers Records	
August 16	The Script	Satellites	Pop, rock	BMG	
August 16	Starflyer 59	Lust for Gold		Velvet Blue Music	
August 16	Tinashe	Quantum Baby	Pop, R&B	Tinashe Music, Nice Life	
August 16	Wishy	Triple Seven		Winspear	
August 16	Yours Truly	Toxic	Pop-punk	UNFD	
August 19	Ka	The Thief Next to Jesus	Experimental hip-hop	Iron Works	
August 21	Kenshi Yonezu	Lost Corner		Sony Japan	
August 23	Cash Cobain	Play Cash Cobain	Hip-hop, R&B	Giant Music	
August 23	Cassyette	This World Fucking Sucks		23 Recordings	
August 23	Delta Heavy	Midnight Forever		RAM	
August 23	Emily Wurramara	Nara		ABC Music	
August 23	Fleshgod Apocalypse	Opera	Symphonic death metal	Nuclear Blast	
August 23	Fontaines D.C.	Romance	Alternative rock	XL	
August 23	Heems	Veena		Veena Sounds	
August 23	Illuminati Hotties	Power	Indie rock	Hopeless	
August 23	India Ramey	Baptized by the Blaze	Country	Mule Kick Records	
August 23	Jon Anderson and the Band Geeks	True		Frontiers	
August 23	Kishi Bashi	Kantos		Joyful Noise	
August 23	Lainey Wilson	Whirlwind	Country	BBR	
August 23	Luna Li	When a Thought Grows Wings		In Real Life, AWAL	
August 23	Magdalena Bay	Imaginal Disk	Synth-pop, dance-pop, electronic rock	Mom + Pop	
August 23	Melt-Banana	3+5	Noise rock, experimental rock, hardcore punk	A-Zap	
August 23	Mothica	Kissing Death		Heavy Heart Records, Rise	
August 23	Nile	The Underworld Awaits Us All	Technical death metal, brutal death metal	Napalm	
August 23	Ruthie Foster	Mileage	Blues	Sun Records	
August 23	Sabrina Carpenter	Short n' Sweet	Pop	Island	
August 23	Simone Simons	Vermillion		Nuclear Blast	
August 23	Sofi Tukker	Bread		Ultra	
August 23	The Softies	The Bed I Made		Father/Daughter	
August 23	Spirit of the Beehive	You'll Have to Lose Something		Saddle Creek	
August 23	Stand Atlantic	Was Here		Hopeless	
August 23	Teenage Dads	Majordomo	Indie pop	Chugg	
August 23	Thomas Rhett	About a Woman	Country	Valory	
August 23	Vanessa Williams	Survivor	R&B	Mellian Music, WMG	
August 23	Within the Ruins	Phenomena II		MNRK	
August 23	Zeal & Ardor	Greif	Black metal, avant-garde metal	Redacted Records	
August 26	Zerobaseone	Cinema Paradise	K-pop	WakeOne	
August 30	Awolnation	The Phantom Five		Better Noise	
August 30	Big Sean	Better Me Than You	Hip-hop, funk	FF to Def Entertainment, Def Jam	
August 30	Los Bitchos	Talkie Talkie		City Slang	
August 30	Chelsea Wolfe	Undone EP		Loma Vista	
August 30	Dan Mangan	Being Elsewhere Mix	Indie folk, indie rock	Arts & Crafts	
August 30	Destroy Lonely	Love Lasts Forever	Hip-hop	Opium, Interscope	
August 30	Doechii	Alligator Bites Never Heal	Hip-hop	TDE, Capitol	
August 30	Duster	In Dreams	Pop, rock	Numero	
August 30	Enumclaw	Home in Another Life		Run for Cover	
August 30	John Legend	My Favorite Dream	Children's music	Republic, John Legend Music	
August 30	Jon Hopkins	Ritual	Ambient, electronic	Domino	
August 30	Jónsi	First Light		Myndstream, Lakeshore	
August 30	Laurie Anderson	Amelia	Experimental music	Nonesuch	
August 30	Le Sserafim	Crazy		Source Music	
August 30	Leprous	Melodies of Atonement	Progressive metal	Inside Out Music	
August 30	Marianas Trench	Haven		604, Warner Canada	
August 30	Nails	Every Bridge Burning	Grindcore, powerviolence, hardcore punk	Nuclear Blast	
August 30	Nick Cave and the Bad Seeds	Wild God		PIAS	
August 30	Oceano	Living Chaos	Deathcore, djent	Sumerian	
August 30	Palaye Royale	Death or Glory		Sumerian	
August 30	Paris Paloma	Cacophony	Dark pop, folk, indie	Nettwerk	
August 30	Remedy Drive	Scars to Prove It		Remedy Drive	
August 30	Seefeel	Everything Squared		Warp	
August 30	To the Grave	Everyone's a Murderer		Unique Leader Records	
August 30	Ty Segall	Love Rudiments		Drag City	
August 30	Various artists	Synthesizing the Silk Roads		Ostinato Records	
August 30	Wintersun	Time II	Melodic death metal, symphonic metal, power metal	Nuclear Blast	
August 30	Wunderhorse	Midas		Communion	
August 30	Yannis & The Yaw	Lagos Paris London		Transgressive	
August 30	Zedd	Telos		Interscope	

=== September ===
List of albums released in September 2024
Go to: January | February | March | April | May | June | July | August | September | October | November | December | Back to top
Release date	Artist	Album	Genre	Label	Ref.
September 6	Boston Manor	Sundiver		SharpTone	
September 6	The Dare	What's Wrong with New York?	Electroclash	The Dare Is a Business, Polydor, Republic	
September 6	David Gilmour	Luck and Strange		Sony Music	
September 6	Fat Dog	Woof.	Dance-punk, industrial, IDM	Domino	
September 6	Fred Again	Ten Days	House	Atlantic, Warner Music UK	
September 6	George Strait	Cowboys and Dreamers	Neotraditional country, honky-tonk	MCA Nashville	
September 6	God Is an Astronaut	Embers	Post-rock, indie rock, ambient	Napalm	
September 6	Hinds	Viva Hinds	Garage rock	Lucky Number Records	
September 6	Jhayco	Le Clique: Vida Rockstar (X)		Universal Music Latino	
September 6	Laila!	Gap Year!		IIIXL Studio	
September 6	LL Cool J	The FORCE	Hip-hop	LL Cool J, Inc., Def Jam, VMG	
September 6	Max Richter	In a Landscape		Decca	
September 6	Mercury Rev	Born Horses		Bella Union	
September 6	Missy Higgins	The Second Act		Eleven	
September 6	MJ Lenderman	Manning Fireworks	Alternative country, slacker rock, country rock	Anti-	
September 6	Nala Sinephro	Endlessness		Warp	
September 6	Okay Kaya	Oh My God – That's So Me		Okay Kaya	
September 6	Paris Hilton	Infinite Icon	Dance-pop	11:11 Media	
September 6	Party Dozen	Crime in Australia		Grupo Records	
September 6	Rex Orange County	The Alexander Technique		RCA	
September 6	Shovels & Rope	Something Is Working Up Above My Head		Dualtone	
September 6	Suuns	The Breaks		Secret City	
September 6	The The	Ensoulment	Post-punk	Cinéola Records, earMusic	
September 6	Toro y Moi	Hole Erth		Dead Oceans	
September 6	Wave to Earth	Play with Earth! 0.03	Soft rock, indie rock, dream pop	Wavy	
September 13	Bill Leeb	Model Kollapse		Metropolis	
September 13	Bones UK	Soft		Sumerian	
September 13	Brantley Gilbert	Tattoos	Country rock	Valory	
September 13	Coin	I'm Not Afraid of Music Anymore		10K	
September 13	Colin Stetson	The Love It Took to Leave You		Envision Records	
September 13	Crobot	Obsidian		Crobot	
September 13	Cursive	Devourer		Run for Cover	
September 13	Dale Crover	Glossolalia		Joyful Noise	
September 13	Dora Jar	No Way to Relax When You Are on Fire		Island	
September 13	Foxing	Foxing	Rock	Grand Paradise	
September 13	Floating Points	Cascade	Electronic	Ninja Tune	
September 13	Flotsam and Jetsam	I Am the Weapon		AFM	
September 13	Ginger Root	Shinbangumi		Ghostly International	
September 13	Hayden James	We Could Be Love	House	Future Classic	
September 13	The Jesus Lizard	Rack	Noise rock	Ipecac	
September 13	Julie	My Anti-Aircraft Friend		Atlantic	
September 13	London Grammar	The Greatest Love		Ministry of Sound, Metal & Dust	
September 13	Loveless	Loveless II		Rise	
September 13	Miranda Lambert	Postcards from Texas	Country	Republic	
September 13	My Brightest Diamond	Fight the Real Terror		Western Vinyl	
September 13	Nada Surf	Moon Mirror		New West	
September 13	Nick Lowe	Indoor Safari	Rock and roll, Americana	Yep Roc	
September 13	Nilüfer Yanya	My Method Actor		Ninja Tune	
September 13	Polish Club	Heavy Weight Heart			
September 13	Porches	Shirt		Domino	
September 13	The Quireboys	Wardour Street		Cadiz Music	
September 13	Robyn Hitchcock	1967: Vacations in the Past		Tiny Ghost Records	
September 13	Snotty Nose Rez Kids	Red Future		Sony Music Canada	
September 13	Snow Patrol	The Forest Is the Path		Polydor	
September 13	Suki Waterhouse	Memoir of a Sparklemuffin	Pop	Sub Pop	
September 13	Tindersticks	Soft Tissue		City Slang	
September 13	Trentemøller	Dreamweaver		In My Room	
September 13	Zetra	Zetra		Nuclear Blast	
September 19	Lamin	SkyLL	Hip-hop	Universal Music Denmark	
September 20	The Alchemist	The Genuine Articulate		ALC Records	
September 20	Attack Attack!	Disaster		Oxide Records	
September 20	Blossoms	Gary	Indie rock, pop rock	ODD SK Recordings	
September 20	Blu & Exile	Love (the) Ominous World		Dirty Science	
September 20	Bright Eyes	Five Dice, All Threes		Dead Oceans	
September 20	Charlotte Wessels	The Obsession		Napalm	
September 20	Fidlar	Surviving the Dream		Fidlar	
September 20	Future	Mixtape Pluto		Freebandz, Epic	
September 20	Grateful Dead	Friend of the Devils: April 1978	Rock	Rhino	
September 20	Gregg Allman Band	Uncle Sam's	Rock	Sawrite	
September 20	Herb Alpert	50	Jazz	Herb Alpert Presents	
September 20	Hippo Campus	Flood		Psychic Hotline	
September 20	Jamie xx	In Waves		Young	
September 20	Joan As Police Woman	Lemons, Limes & Orchids		PIAS	
September 20	Kate Pierson	Radio and Rainbows		SVR Records	
September 20	Katy Perry	143	Pop, dance-pop, Europop	Capitol	
September 20	Keith Urban	High		Hit Red Records	
September 20	Lil Tecca	Plan A	Hip-hop	Galactic Records, Republic	
September 20	Manu Chao	Viva Tu		Because	
September 20	MC Lyte	1 of 1			
September 20	Michael Schenker	My Years With UFO		earMusic	
September 20	Midland	Barely Blue			
September 20	Miss Kaninna	Kaninna		Soul Has No Tempo	
September 20	Nando Reis	Uma Estrela Misteriosa Revelará o Segredo	Rock, soul, samba	Relicário	
September 20	Nelly Furtado	7		Nelstar Entertainment, 21 Entertainment Group, Casablanca	
September 20	Nightwish	Yesterwynde	Symphonic metal, progressive metal, gothic metal	Nuclear Blast	
September 20	Noga Erez	The Vandalist	Pop, Alternative rock, EDM	Neon Gold, Atlantic	
September 20	Nubya Garcia	Odyssey	Jazz	Concord Jazz	
September 20	Purple Disco Machine	Paradise		Columbia	
September 20	The Rubens	Soda		Ivy League	
September 20	Seether	The Surface Seems So Far	Alternative metal, post-grunge	Fantasy	
September 20	Thurston Moore	Flow Critical Lucidity	Experimental rock, no wave	The Daydream Library Series	
September 20	The Voidz	Like All Before You	Neo-psychedelia, art rock, alternative rock	Cult	
September 20	The Waeve	City Lights		Transgressive	
September 25	Kimbra	Idols & Vices (Vol. 1)			
September 27	Alan Sparhawk	White Roses, My God		Sub Pop	
September 27	Being Dead	Eels	Garage rock	Bayonet Records	
September 27	Ben Böhmer	Bloom		Ninja Tune	
September 27	Billy Strings	Highway Prayers	Bluegrass	Reprise	
September 27	The Black Dahlia Murder	Servitude	Melodic death metal	Metal Blade	
September 27	Brett Eldredge	Merry Christmas (Welcome to the Family)		Warm and Cozy Records	
September 27	Christian Lee Hutson	Paradise Pop. 10		Anti-	
September 27	DaBaby	How TF Is This a Mixtape?		South Coast Music Group, Interscope	
September 27	Destroy Rebuild Until God Shows	Until God Shows	Post-hardcore, pop, metalcore	Velocity	
September 27	Ezra Collective	Dance, No One's Watching		Partisan	
September 27	Gilbert O'Sullivan	Songbook			
September 27	Hayden Thorpe	Ness		Domino	
September 27	Heriot	Devoured by the Mouth of Hell	Metalcore	Century Media	
September 27	Hildur Guðnadóttir	Joker: Folie à Deux (Score from the Original Motion Picture Soundtrack)		WaterTower	
September 27	Lady Gaga	Harlequin	Traditional pop, jazz	Interscope	
September 27	Luke Bryan	Mind of a Country Boy		Capitol Nashville	
September 27	Maxïmo Park	Stream of Life		Lower Third Records	
September 27	Mickey Guyton	House on Fire	Country		
September 27	Mustafa	Dunya	Folk	Arts & Crafts, Jagjaguwar	
September 27	Naima Bock	Below a Massive Dark Land		Sub Pop	
September 27	Nina Nesbitt	Mountain Music		Apple Tree Records	
September 27	Nines	Quit While You're Ahead		Zino Records	
September 27	Origami Angel	Feeling Not Found	Pop-punk, emo	Counter Intuitive	
September 27	Pale Waves	Smitten		Dirty Hit	
September 27	Rahim Redcar	Hopecore		Because	
September 27	The Rions	Happiness in a Place It Shouldn't Be		Community Music	
September 27	Sophie	Sophie	Pop, ambient, techno	Transgressive, Future Classic	
September 27	Soul Asylum	Slowly but Shirley		Blue Élan	
September 27	Tommy Richman	Coyote		ISO Supremacy, Pulse Records	
September 27	Van Morrison	New Arrangements and Duets	Rhythm and blues, swing	Virgin, Exile Records	
September 27	William Basinski	September 23		Temporary Residence Limited	
September 27	Xiu Xiu	13" Frank Beltrame Italian Stiletto with Bison Horn Grips	Experimental rock, noise pop, neo-psychedelia	Polyvinyl	

== Fourth quarter ==
=== October ===
List of albums released in October 2024
Go to: January | February | March | April | May | June | July | August | September | October | November | December | Back to top
Release date	Artist	Album	Genre	Label	Ref.
October 2	454	Casts of a Dreamer		4Ever	
October 4	310babii	310degrees		High IQ, Empire	
October 4	Alison Moyet	Key	Alternative pop, synth-pop	Cooking Vinyl, Motley Music	
October 4	Balance and Composure	With You in Spirit		Memory Music	
October 4	Blood Incantation	Absolute Elsewhere	Death metal, progressive metal, progressive rock	Century Media	
October 4	Caribou	Honey		Merge	
October 4	Chubby and the Gang	And Then There Was...		Flatspot Records	
October 4	Coldplay	Moon Music	Pop rock	Parlophone, Atlantic	
October 4	Cumgirl8	The 8th Cumming		4AD	
October 4	Drug Church	Prude		Pure Noise	
October 4	Fever 333	Darker White		Century Media	
October 4	Finneas	For Cryin' Out Loud!	Alternative rock	OYOY, Interscope	
October 4	Geordie Greep	The New Sound	Progressive rock, Latin rock, jazz-rock	Rough Trade	
October 4	Godspeed You! Black Emperor	No Title as of 13 February 2024 28,340 Dead	Orchestral rock	Constellation	
October 4	Hard-Ons	I Like You a Lot Getting Older		Cheersquad Records	
October 4	Jake Bugg	A Modern Day Distraction	Indie rock	RCA, Sony Music	
October 4	James Bay	Changes All the Time		Mercury	
October 4	Kasey Chambers	Backbone		Essence Music	
October 4	Leon Bridges	Leon	Country, soul, folk	Columbia	
October 4	Orla Gartland	Everybody Needs a Hero		New Friends	
October 4	A Place to Bury Strangers	Synthesizer		Dedstrange Records	
October 4	Public Service Broadcasting	The Last Flight		SO Recordings	
October 4	Rich Homie Quan	Forever Goin In		Rich Homie Entertainment	
October 4	The Smile	Cutouts	Experimental rock	XL	
October 4	Tee Grizzley	Post Traumatic	Hip-hop	300	
October 4	TISM	Death to Art		Genre B. Goode	
October 4	Toosii	Jaded		South Coast Music Group, Capitol	
October 4	Trash Boat	Heaven Can Wait		Hopeless	
October 4	Yasmin Williams	Acadia	Folk, country	Nonesuch	
October 4	ZZ Ward	Mother		Dirty Shine, Sun	
October 10	Becky G	Encuentros		Kemosabe, Sony Latin, RCA	
October 10	Elephant Tree and Lowrider	The Long Forever	Stoner rock	Blues Funeral Recordings	
October 11	BigXthaPlug	Take Care	Hip-hop, Southern hip-hop, trap	UnitedMasters	
October 11	Charli XCX	Brat and It's Completely Different but Also Still Brat	Electropop	Atlantic	
October 11	Chat Pile	Cool World	Noise rock, sludge metal	The Flenser	
October 11	Dawes	Oh Brother		Dead Ringers	
October 11	Downsyde	Stereotypez		OptShop, MGM	
October 11	Elucid	Revelator		Fat Possum	
October 11	Envy	Eunoia		Temporary Residence Limited	
October 11	Glaive	May It Never Falter	Noise pop, electronic		
October 11	GloRilla	Glorious		CMG, Interscope	
October 11	House of Lords	Full Tilt Overdrive		Frontiers	
October 11	Jelly Roll	Beautifully Broken		Republic	
October 11	Jon Toogood	Last of the Lonely Gods		Warner Music Australia	
October 11	Justin Moore	This Is My Dirt		Valory	
October 11	The Linda Lindas	No Obligation		Epitaph	
October 11	Myles Kennedy	The Art of Letting Go		Napalm	
October 11	The Offspring	Supercharged	Punk rock, pop-punk	Concord	
October 11	Paul Heaton	The Mighty Several			
October 11	Rod Wave	Last Lap		Alamo	
October 11	Rüfüs Du Sol	Inhale / Exhale		Rose Avenue, Reprise	
October 11	Samara Joy	Portrait	Jazz	Verve	
October 11	Touché Amoré	Spiral in a Straight Line	Post-hardcore	Rise	
October 15	Cold Cave	Passion Depression		Heartworm Press Records	
October 16	Nothing,Nowhere	Miserymaker		Reapers Realm Records	
October 18	Bear Hands	The Key to What		Rostrum, Cantora	
October 18	Benny the Butcher and 38 Spesh	Stabbed & Shot 2		T.C.L. Music Group, Black Soprano Family	
October 18	The Blessed Madonna	Godspeed	Electronic	Warner	
October 18	Bon Iver	Sable		Jagjaguwar	
October 18	Catty	Healing Out of Spite	Pop rock	AWAL	
October 18	Chino Pacas	Que Sigan Llegando las Pacas		PFL, Street Mob Records, Geffen	
October 18	Christopher Owens	I Wanna Run Barefoot Through Your Hair		True Panther	
October 18	Confidence Man	3AM (La La La)		I Oh You	
October 18	Dan + Shay	It's Officially Christmas: The Double Album			
October 18	Dean Lewis	The Epilogue		Island	
October 18	High Vis	Guided Tour		Dais	
October 18	Hildegard (Helena Deland and Ouri)	Jour 1596		Chivi Chivi Records	
October 18	Japandroids	Fate & Alcohol		Anti-	
October 18	Jennifer Hudson	The Gift of Love	Christmas	Interscope	
October 18	Jerry Cantrell	I Want Blood		Double J Music	
October 18	Jordana	Lively Premonition		Grand Jury Music	
October 18	Joy Oladokun	Observations from a Crowded Room		Amigo Records, Verve Forecast, Republic	
October 18	Karate	Make It Fit		The Numero Group	
October 18	Kelly Lee Owens	Dreamstate		DH2	
October 18	Kylie Minogue	Tension II	Dance-pop, electronic	BMG	
October 18	Machine Girl	MG Ultra		Future Classic	
October 18	MC5	Heavy Lifting	Hard rock	earMusic	
October 18	Phantogram	Memory of a Day		Neon Gold	
October 18	Pinhead Gunpowder	Unt	Punk rock, pop-punk	1-2-3-4 Go! Records	
October 18	Porridge Radio	Clouds in the Sky They Will Always Be There for Me		Secretly Canadian	
October 18	Pvris	F.I.L.T.H.		Hopeless	
October 18	Rag'n'Bone Man	What Do You Believe In?	Soul, pop	Columbia	
October 18	Riley Green	Don't Mind If I Do	Country	Nashville Harbor	
October 18	Roy Hargrove's Crisol	Grande-Terre	Jazz	Verve	
October 18	Skegss	Pacific Highway Music		Loma Vista	
October 18	Thelma Plum	I'm Sorry, Now Say It Back		Warner Music Australia	
October 18	Tim Heidecker	Slipping Away	Americana	Bloodshot	
October 18	Yeat	Lyfestyle	Trap, rage	Lyfestyle Corporation, Field Trip, Capitol	
October 20	Prostitute	Attempted Martyr			
October 22	Cameron Winter	Singles		Partisan, PIAS	
October 25	2nd Grade	Scheduled Explosions		Double Double Whammy	
October 25	311	Full Bloom			
October 25	The Allman Brothers Band	Final Concert 10-28-14	Blues rock, Southern rock	Peach Records	
October 25	Amyl and the Sniffers	Cartoon Darkness		B2B Records, Virgin	
October 25	Bastille	"&"		Best Laid Plans, EMI	
October 25	Beach Weather	Melt	Indie rock, pop rock, synth-pop	8123, Last Nite, Arista	
October 25	Ben Folds	Sleigher		New West	
October 25	Courteeners	Pink Cactus Café		Ignition	
October 25	Devin Townsend	PowerNerd	Progressive metal	Inside Out Music	
October 25	Fit for an Autopsy	The Nothing That Is	Deathcore, progressive death metal	Nuclear Blast	
October 25	Florence and the Machine	Symphony of Lungs (BBC Proms at the Royal Albert Hall)			
October 25	Halsey	The Great Impersonator	Pop rock	Columbia	
October 25	Hayley Mary	Roman XS			
October 25	Katie Gavin	What a Relief	Folk-pop	Saddest Factory	
October 25	Kelsea Ballerini	Patterns	Country pop	Black River	
October 25	Latin Mafia	Todos los días todo el día	Latin	Rimas	
October 25	Laura Marling	Patterns in Repeat		Chrysalis, Partisan	
October 25	Lone Justice	Viva Lone Justice		AFAR Records, Fire	
October 25	Peach Pit	Magpie		Columbia	
October 25	Pixies	The Night the Zombies Came		BMG	
October 25	Pom Pom Squad	Mirror Starts Moving Without Me		City Slang	
October 25	Razorlight	Planet Nowhere		V2	
October 25	Soccer Mommy	Evergreen		Loma Vista	
October 25	St. Lenox	Ten Modern American Work Songs		Don Giovanni, Anyway	
October 25	Underworld	Strawberry Hotel		Virgin, Smith Hyde Productions	
October 28	Tyler, the Creator	Chromakopia	Hip-hop, R&B, jazz	Columbia	
October 29	EarthGang	Perfect Fantasy		SinceThe80s, Dreamville, UnitedMasters	
October 31	Lloyd Banks	Halloween Havoc V		Money by Any Means, Inc.	
October 31	Westside Gunn	11		Griselda	

=== November ===
List of albums released in November 2024
Go to: January | February | March | April | May | June | July | August | September | October | November | December | Back to top
Release date	Artist	Album	Genre	Label	Ref.
November 1	Babymonster	Drip	K-pop	YG	
November 1	Cane Hill	A Piece of Me I Never Let You Find	Metalcore	Out of Line	
November 1	Chase Atlantic	Lost in Heaven	Alternative R&B, pop rock	Fearless	
November 1	The Cure	Songs of a Lost World	Gothic rock, space rock	Lost Music, Fiction, Polydor	
November 1	Fionn Regan	O Avalanche			
November 1	Freddie Gibbs	You Only Die 1nce	Hip-hop	ESGN, AWAL	
November 1	Haley Heynderickx	Seed of a Seed		Mama Bird Recording Co	
November 1	IDK	Bravado + Intimo		IDK	
November 1	Jimmy Fallon	Holiday Seasoning		Republic	
November 1	Kodak Black	Dieuson Octave		Vulture Love, Capitol	
November 1	Lil Uzi Vert	Eternal Atake 2	Trap	Atlantic, Generation Now	
November 1	Mount Eerie	Night Palace		P.W. Elverum & Sun Ltd.	
November 1	Mxmtoon	Liminal Space		AWAL	
November 1	Paul Kelly	Fever Longing Still		EMI Australia	
November 1	Planes Mistaken for Stars	Do You Still Love Me?		Deathwish Inc.	
November 1	Sarah Blasko	I Just Need to Conquer This Mountain			
November 1	Skillet	Revolution	Hard rock	Hear It Loud Records.	
November 1	Thus Love	All Pleasure		Captured Tracks	
November 1	Westside Gunn	Still Praying	Hip-hop	Griselda	
November 1	Willie Nelson	Last Leaf on the Tree	Country	Legacy	
November 4	Tomorrow X Together	The Star Chapter: Sanctuary	Pop, R&B	Big Hit, Republic, YG Plus	
November 8	Ab-Soul	Soul Burger		TDE	
November 8	ASAP Ferg	Darold		RCA	
November 8	BabyTron	Tronicles		The Hip Hop Lab, Empire	
November 8	The Browning	Omni		FiXT	
November 8	Claire Rousay	The Bloody Lady		Viernulvier Records	
November 8	King Stingray	For the Dreams		Cooking Vinyl Australia	
November 8	Make Them Suffer	Make Them Suffer	Deathcore, metalcore, djent	SharpTone	
November 8	Primal Scream	Come Ahead		BMG	
November 8	State Champs	State Champs		Pure Noise	
November 8	Yoo Doo Right	From the Heights of Our Pastureland		Mothland Records	
November 11	NCT Dream	Dreamscape		SM, Kakao	
November 13	Stray Kids	Giant		Epic Japan	
November 13	Young Nudy and Pi'erre Bourne	Sli'merre 2		RCA	
November 15	070 Shake	Petrichor		Def Jam	
November 15	As I Lay Dying	Through Storms Ahead	Metalcore	Napalm	
November 15	Brooks & Dunn	Reboot II	Country	Sony Nashville	
November 15	Cordae	The Crossroads		Art@War, Atlantic	
November 15	Dean & Britta and Sonic Boom	A Peace of Us		Carpark	
November 15	Dolly Parton & Family	Smoky Mountain DNA – Family, Faith & Fables		Owepar Entertainment	
November 15	Dwight Yoakam	Brighter Days	Country	Thirty Tigers	
November 15	Fazerdaze	Soft Power			
November 15	Flo	Access All Areas	R&B	Island	
November 15	Gwen Stefani	Bouquet		Interscope	
November 15	Half Alive	Persona		Virgin	
November 15	Illy	Good Life		Warner Music Australia	
November 15	Jin	Happy		Big Hit	
November 15	Jon Batiste	Beethoven Blues (Batiste Piano Series, Vol. 1)		Verve, Interscope	
November 15	Linkin Park	From Zero	Nu metal, alternative rock, electronic rock	Warner, Machine Shop	
November 15	Mary J. Blige	Gratitude	R&B	300, Mary Jane Productions	
November 15	Maxo Kream	Personification	Hip-hop, trap		
November 15	Nessa Barrett	Aftercare	Alternative pop, dark pop, electropop	Warner	
November 15	Pa Salieu	Afrikan Alien			
November 15	Poppy	Negative Spaces	Pop metal, metalcore, alternative metal	Sumerian	
November 15	Rauw Alejandro	Cosa Nuestra	Salsa, reggaeton	Sony Music Latin	
November 15	Shawn Mendes	Shawn	Folk rock, folk-pop	Island	
November 15	Wallice	The Jester		Dirty Hit	
November 15	Worm Shepherd	Hunger		Unique Leader Records	
November 21	The Coward Brothers (Elvis Costello and T Bone Burnett)	The Coward Brothers	Rock	New West	
November 22	Body Count	Merciless	Rap metal	Century Media	
November 22	Father John Misty	Mahashmashana	Art pop, art rock	Sub Pop	
November 22	Ice Cube	Man Down	West Coast hip-hop, gangsta rap	Lench Mob	
November 22	Joan Armatrading	How Did This Happen and What Does It Now Mean			
November 22	John Hammond	Bear's Sonic Journals: You're Doin' Fine	Blues	Owsley Stanley Foundation	
November 22	Kendrick Lamar	GNX	West Coast hip-hop	PGLang, Interscope	
November 22	Kim Deal	Nobody Loves You More	Alternative rock	4AD	
November 22	Marilyn Manson	One Assassination Under God – Chapter 1		Nuclear Blast	
November 22	Michael Kiwanuka	Small Changes	Psychedelic soul	Polydor, Interscope	
November 22	Ocean Grove	Oddworld	Nu metal, hardcore punk, rap metal	SharpTone	
November 22	Opeth	The Last Will and Testament	Progressive death metal	Reigning Phoenix Music	
November 22	Van Zant	Always Look Up		Frontiers	
November 22	Wicked movie cast, Cynthia Erivo and Ariana Grande	Wicked: The Soundtrack		Republic, Verve	
November 22	Wizkid	Morayo	Afrobeats, R&B	Starboy Entertainment, RCA	
November 25	WayV	Frequency		SM	
November 28	Society of Beggars	Levitator			
November 29	The Innocence Mission	Midwinter Swimmers	Dream pop, folk	Bella Union, P-Vine, Thérèse Records	
November 29	Juice Wrld	The Party Never Ends		Grade A, Interscope	
November 29	Kodak Black	Trill Bill		Vulture Love, Capitol	
November 29	The Unthanks	In Winter	Folk	Rabble Rouser	

=== December ===
List of albums released in December 2024
Go to: January | February | March | April | May | June | July | August | September | October | November | December | Back to top
Release date	Artist	Album	Genre	Label	Ref.
December 6	Cameron Winter	Heavy Metal	Folk, soul, neo-classical	Partisan	
December 6	Cory Marks	Sorry for Nothing	Country rock	Better Noise	
December 6	Fennesz	Mosaic		Touch	
December 6	Lauren Mayberry	Vicious Creature	Pop	EMI, Island	
December 6	Mashd N Kutcher	Legacy		Mash Machine Records	
December 6	Nettspend	Bad Ass F*cking Kid	Trap	Grade A, Interscope	
December 6	Rosé	Rosie	Pop, pop-punk, alt-pop	The Black Label, Atlantic	
December 6	Stress Eater (Czarface and Kool Keith)	Everybody Eats!		Silver Age	
December 6	Twice	Strategy	Electropop, bubblegum pop, R&B	JYP, Republic	
December 6	White Denim	12	Alternative rock, psychedelic rock	Bella Union	
December 6	YoungBoy Never Broke Again	I Just Got a Lot on My Shoulders	Southern hip-hop	Never Broke Again, Motown	
December 9	Roc Marciano and the Alchemist	The Skeleton Key	East Coast hip-hop, gangsta rap	Pimpire, ALC Records	
December 13	BossMan Dlow	Dlow Curry		Alamo	
December 13	Mario	Glad You Came		New Citizen, Epic	
December 13	Saint Etienne	The Night		Heavenly	
December 13	Snoop Dogg	Missionary	West Coast hip-hop	Death Row, Aftermath, Interscope	
December 13	Stray Kids	Hop		JYP, Republic	
December 20	G Herbo	Greatest Rapper Alive		G Herbo	
December 20	Mozzy and Kalan.FrFr	Lucky Her		Mozzy Records, Empire	
December 20	Nothing,Nowhere	Cult Classic		Reapers Realm Records	
December 20	Timothée Chalamet	A Complete Unknown (Original Motion Picture Soundtrack)		Columbia	
December 25	Whirr	Raw Blue	Shoegaze	Funeral Party Records	
