= Mali Velasquez =

American musician

Mali Velasquez is an American indie folk musician based in Nashville, Tennessee.

== History ==
After spending her childhood living between two Texas small towns, Amalia "Mali" Velasquez moved to Nashville to pursue a career in music. She announced in September 2023 plans to release her debut album, titled I'm Green. The second single, "Bobby", was released in August 2023. Her album I'm Green was released on October 13, 2023. The album received positive reviews.

The album was named one of Paste's "30 Best Debut Albums of 2023".

In 2024, Velasquez embarked on a co-headlining tour with Bloomsday.

== Musical Influence ==
Mali's music has been associated with the indie folk genre. Her sound is influenced by a fusion of indie, country, and folk artists, such as Waylon Jennings and Neil Young.
