= Legacy (Kyshona album) =

Studio album by Kyshona
- Released: April 26, 2024
- Recorded: 2024
- Studio: Southern Grooves, Memphis, Tennessee, US
- Length: 50:00
- Language: English
- Producer: Kyshona, Rachael Moore

Kyshona chronology
Listen (2020)	Legacy (2024)

Legacy is a 2024 studio album by American singer-songwriter and music therapist Kyshona.

== Background and conception ==
Kyshona began writing the songs that would eventually make up Legacy after she lost an elder member of her family. In 2021, during a tour stop in Washington, D.C., she visited the Smithsonian Institute's National Museum of African American History & Culture. There, she worked with a genealogist to trace her family's history. She traced five generations back to uncover records dating back to the period of U.S. enslavement.

In making the album, Kyshona collaborated with blues and Americana artists such as Keb' Mo', Ruthie Foster, and Brittney Spencer. The album was recorded in Memphis, Tennessee, and local musicians provided background vocals.

== Reception ==
Legacy received positive reviews from Americana and folk music critics. It was also included on The Boston Globe's 2024 year-end list, with Victoria Wasylak calling the album "an expansive tribute whose soul-stirring melodies resurrect the past with striking clarity."

== Track listing ==
Legacy track listing
No.	Title	Length
1.	"Elephants (with Nickie Conley)"	2:51
2.	"The Echo"	4:15
3.	"Waitin' on the Lawd (with Odessa Settles, Ruthie Foster, and Chris Pierce)"	3:30
4.	"Whispers in the Walls (with Ellen Angelico)"	3:36
5.	"Alma Ree (with Nickie Conley)"	4:39
6.	"Interlude: Grandpa H.T. and The Church Elders"	0:38
7.	"Heaven is a Beautiful Place (with Nickie Conley and Maureen Murphy)"	5:30
8.	"Always a Daughter"	2:41
9.	"Interlude: From Grandpa's Tapes"	0:57
10.	"What's in a Name"	2:53
11.	"Where My Mind Goes"	2:52
12.	"Comin' Out Swingin' (with Kelvin Armstrong)"	3:22
13.	"Carolina (with Keb' Mo')"	3:55
14.	"Where I Started From"	2:45
15.	"Interlude (A Word)"	0:46
16.	"Covered"	4:43
Total length:		50:00

== See also ==
- 2024 in American music
- List of 2024 albums
