= Forgot About Me =

Studio album by Pouty
- Released: February 9, 2024
- Studio: Headroom Studios (piano and Wurlitzer); Hi-5 Recording Studios ("Underwear"); Jamtown, Philadelphia, Pennsylvania, US; Kingsize Studios, Los Angeles, California, US (vocals)
- Genre: Power pop
- Length: 26:15
- Language: English
- Label: Get Better
- Producer: Chris Baglivo; Evan Bernard

Pouty chronology
| Saint Mary of the Moods (2017) | Forgot About Me (2024) |

Forgot About Me is the debut full-length studio album by American musician Pouty. It has received positive reviews from critics.

== Reception ==
Rachel Saywitz of Paste rated this album a 7.7 out of 10, calling the music "blistering pop-rock" that includes "unbridled, unironic joy" while also confronting themes of aging and "unresolved chaos". Editors at Pitchfork shortlisted this among seven albums to listen to for the week and critic Nina Corcoran rated the work a 7.5 out of 10 for "sharp power-pop melodies and radiant production". Editors at Stereogum chose this as Album of the Week, with critic James Rettig remarking the album has "music that has such a youthful exuberance and yet is still weighed down by the fear that you're never making enough of the time you've been given" and that the lyrics explore the weight of experience alongside living in one's fantasies. In Under the Radar, Frank Valish gave this album 8 out of 10 stars, calling it "a brilliant return, made all the more exciting by the fact that it seemed that Gagliardi and Pouty were gone from album making for good".

== Track listing ==
All songs written by Rachel Gagliardi.

1. "Salty" – 3:00
2. "The Big Stage" – 3:54
3. "Bridge Burner" – 3:59
4. "Virgos Need More Love" – 2:22
5. "Denial Is a Heavy Drug" – 2:38
6. "I Can't See It" – 1:58
7. "Kill a Feeling" – 2:59
8. "TV on TV" – 2:46
9. "Underwear" – 2:38

== Personnel ==
- Rachel Gagliardi – vocals
- Chris Baglivo – guitar, keyboard, percussion, bass guitar, mixing, production
- Evan Bernard – guitar, keyboard, percussion, bass guitar, production
- Mike Brenner – steel guitar on "Bridge Burner"
- Zach Miller – piano on "Bridge Burner"
- Jarret Nathan – drums
- Sheldon Omar-Abba – photography
- Cat Park – bass guitar
- Nathan Pence – double bass on "Underwear"
- Ryan Schwabe – mastering

== See also ==
- 2024 in American music
- List of 2024 albums
