= If I Don't Make It, I Love U =

Studio album by Still House Plants
- Released: 12 April 2024
- Genre: Post-rock; math rock
- Length: 46:04
- Label: Bison
- Producer: Shaun Crook; Darren Clark

Still House Plants chronology
Fast Edit (2020)	If I Don't Make It, I Love U (2024)

If I Don't Make It, I Love U is the third studio album by British band Still House Plants, released on 12 April 2024 through Bison Records.

== Critical reception ==
Professional ratings
Aggregate scores
Source	Rating
AnyDecentMusic?	8.6/10
Metacritic	90/100
Review scores
Source	Rating
Exclaim!	9/10
The Guardian	5/5 stars
Pitchfork	8.5/10
The Skinny	5/5 stars

If I Don't Make It, I Love U received a score of 90 out of 100 on review aggregator Metacritic based on seven critics' reviews, indicating "universal acclaim". Stereogum named it album of the week, with the site's Joshua Minsoo Kim writing that the album "finds the group aiming for a more robust sound" and calling "Sticky" a "tremendous showcase of the band's cohesion". Hayley Scott of The Quietus felt that the band "embrace, not shun, sounds absorbed from childhood in working-class environments" including "skeletal post-rock with soul and jazz, deconstructed by a presiding impulse to blur lines between terms or genres".

Reviewing the album for Exclaim!, Tom Piekarski described it as "an engrossing testament to the musical elasticity and emotional potency of rock music" and "an album both experimental and laid fully bare—the result is one of the best rock records of the year". Ben Beaumont-Thomas of The Guardian called vocalist Jess Hickie-Kallenbach "most astonishing of all [...] singing with more power and confidence than ever before. Her luminously soulful voice is a distinctive instrument, with vibrato that makes whole songs shudder with life". He concluded that Still House Plants are "the most vital band in Britain today, in every sense, and we will be blessed indeed if we get a better album from these shores all year".

The Skinny's Joe Creely remarked that it is "marginally more sonically polished, but loses nothing of their angular charm, if anything bringing out more of the thrashy energy and emotional heft of their live shows". Jenn Pelly of Pitchfork said that the album "still eschews conventional song forms in favor of a kind of collective flickering, with rhythms that speed and slow by their own logic and carry the persistent charge of small epiphanies". The album was rated the fifteenth best of 2024 by Pitchfork.

=== Year-end lists ===
Select year-end rankings for If I Don't Make It, I Love U
Publication/critic	Accolade	Rank	Ref.
Bleep	Top 10 Albums of 2024	4	
Pitchfork	50 Best Albums of 2024	15	
Exclaim!	50 Best Albums of 2024	26	
Rough Trade UK	Albums of the Year 2024	83	
Uncut	80 Best Albums of 2024	49	

== Track listing ==
If I Don't Make It, I Love U track listing
No.	Title	Length
1.	"M M M"	5:46
2.	"Pant"	2:29
3.	"Sticky"	4:20
4.	"More Boy"	3:47
5.	"Probably"	3:13
6.	"3scr3w3"	3:47
7.	"Silver Grit Passes Thru My Teeth"	5:22
8.	"Headlight"	3:42
9.	"No Sleep Deep Risk"	4:13
10.	"Pushed"	3:08
11.	"More More Faster"	6:17
Total length:		46:04

== Personnel ==
Still House Plants

- Jess Hickie-Kallenbach – vocals
- Finlay Clark – guitar
- David Kennedy – drums
