= Radio DDR (album) =

Studio album by Sharp Pins
- Released: May 19, 2024 (original); March 21, 2025 (expanded edition)
- Recorded: November 2023; April–May 2024
- Genres: Power pop; jangle pop
- Length: 43:01
- Labels: Hallogallo (original): K; Perennial; (expanded)
- Producer: Kai Slater

Sharp Pins chronology
Turtle Rock (2023)	Radio DDR (2024)	Balloon Balloon Balloon (2025)

Radio DDR is the second studio album by Sharp Pins, the solo project of the American musician Kai Slater of Lifeguard. Slater self-released its original 11-song version through Bandcamp on May 19, 2024, with sales benefiting the Palestine Children's Relief Fund; he also issued it on cassette through his Hallogallo series. K Records and Perennial co-released an expanded 14-song edition digitally on March 21, 2025, and on LP on April 4; it added "I Can't Stop", "Storma Lee", and "With a Girl Like Mine".

Slater developed the album's songs while playing solo concerts and recorded most of the parts himself. He said that his usual recording setup used a Tascam 688 cassette eight-track, and that he used track bouncing specifically to accommodate the percussion and layered vocal harmonies on "Storma Lee"; only "You Have a Way" is credited as a performance by the three-piece live lineup. Slater later described the album as an unusually direct project for him: its arrangements were settled before recording, in contrast with the experimentation of his other work.

Critics characterized Radio DDR as power pop, jangle pop, and lo-fi guitar pop, drawing on 1960s pop and later home-recording traditions. Reviewers identified love, longing, melancholy, and the transience of youth as recurring lyrical themes. The album received positive reviews from critics, who especially praised its compact melodies and abundance of hooks, although some thought it relied too heavily on familiar styles and lacked a defining song. The expanded edition of Radio DDR was named Best New Music by Pitchfork, and Paste ranked the original version 24th on its list of the 100 best albums of 2024.

== Background and development ==
Sharp Pins is the solo project of the American musician Kai Slater, who also performs with the bands Lifeguard and Dwaal Troupe and operates Hallogallo as a zine, tape label, and music festival. Slater began writing songs and making tapes during the COVID-19 pandemic, and he developed Hallogallo to exchange work with other young musicians while in-person performances were suspended. The Sharp Pins debut, Turtle Rock, followed in 2023.

The songs that became Radio DDR developed while Slater was playing solo concerts. In a 2025 interview with the Line of Best Fit, he said that returning audiences required him to write more material, so he tested new songs at those shows and collected them for the album. He had been occupied by other work and had recorded only one song when, about a year after Turtle Rock, he decided he needed to complete another full-length record. Slater characterized the resulting process as atypically direct for him: he knew the arrangements he wanted, concentrated on capturing the performances, and did less experimentation than on his other recordings. He nevertheless said that he was proud of the album. His next Sharp Pins record, Balloon Balloon Balloon (2025), however, returned to a more open-ended method.

== Recording and production ==
Kai Slater wrote, produced, and recorded most of Radio DDR in April and May 2024. "Race for the Audience", the eleventh song on the expanded edition, had been recorded in November 2023 at a location credited as "old Stulo". Slater was the sole vocalist, guitarist, bassist, drummer, and producer on most tracks. "You Have a Way" is the only song performed by the live Sharp Pins trio of Slater, Joe Glass, and Peter Cimbalo, with Glass on bass and Cimbalo on drums.

Slater associated the Sharp Pins project with deliberately limited recording equipment. In an interview with Demo Magazine, he said that he made most of his records with a Tascam 688 cassette eight-track; its restrictions required him to commit to recording decisions and countered his tendency toward perfectionism. On "Storma Lee", he combined previously recorded parts to free up tracks for additional percussion and approximately 14 vocal harmonies. Although the album was largely assembled by Slater alone, the trio adapted its songs for concerts with fewer parts; Slater described the live arrangements as stripped-down versions rather than attempts to reproduce every overdub.

Slater wrote and recorded "I Can't Stop" in approximately 35 minutes after the 2025 reissue had been arranged. He told Stereogum that the song drew on home-punk recordings and was more dub- and dance-oriented than his usual work. By contrast, "Storma Lee" originated with a song he had written at age 17, which he chose because its open arrangement left room for overdubs. The three songs added in 2025 were mastered by Amy Dragon, who also mastered the album for vinyl; Jonny Bell had mastered the original material.

== Release and promotion ==
Radio DDR was released on May 19, 2024, as an 11-track album. It was initially available only through Bandcamp, with sales benefiting the Palestine Children's Relief Fund. The physical edition was a cassette in Kai Slater's Hallogallo tape series.

K Records and Perennial announced an expanded edition with the three new tracks "I Can't Stop", "Storma Lee", and "With a Girl Like Mine". "I Can't Stop" was released with a music video on January 8, 2025. Videos directed by Jolie M-A for "Storma Lee" and "With a Girl Like Mine" followed in February; K identified the latter as the third single. The expanded digital album was issued on March 21, 2025; K announced the LP for April 4.

== Critical reception ==
Professional ratings
Review scores
Source	Rating
AllMusic	3.5/5 stars
New Noise Magazine	4/5 stars
Paste	9.3/10
Pitchfork	8.3/10
PopMatters	8/10

Radio DDR received positive reviews from music critics across its two releases. Ben Salmon of Paste awarded the original 11-song version 9.3 out of 10, while Shaad D'Souza of Pitchfork gave the 14-song expansion 8.3 out of 10 and the publication named it Best New Music. Reviewers of both editions generally praised Slater's compact melodies, abundance of hooks, and ability to make familiar guitar-pop forms feel immediate.

Several critics treated the familiar musical vocabulary as a showcase for Slater's songwriting. Salmon argued that warmer, clearer production displayed Slater's songwriting more fully than Turtle Rock, and D'Souza thought the urgency and density of the songs refreshed their well-worn power-pop references. Fred Thomas of AllMusic similarly found that greater clarity made the hooks, 12-string guitar, and contrast between acoustic and full-band arrangements more prominent, while Jeff Terich of Treble regarded the apparently casual performances as carefully constructed.

Patrick Gill of PopMatters gave the album 8 out of 10 but said its blend of styles could require several listens to appreciate and did not reinvent those styles. Oscar Ortega of New Noise Magazine, who awarded it 4 out of 5, said that although the basic guitar, bass, drums, and cassette-recorded vocals offered nothing new, the album's authenticity was a strength. Cleber Facchi of Música Instantânea found that some arrangements relied excessively on older reference points, although he considered the album emotionally candid enough to establish its own identity.

Reviewers generally regarded the home-recorded sound as a strength rather than merely a constraint. Mariana Timony selected the album for Bandcamp Daily's Essential Releases column, emphasizing its dense layering and the contrast between its tape texture and melodic detail; KEXP called it a breakout set of scrappy but accessible pop songs. D'Souza and Ortega both connected its romantic and melancholy moods with the intensity and impermanence of youth, whereas Kris Handel of Post-Trash heard dry contemporary humor and bitterness beneath its classic-pop melodies.

=== Accolades ===
Accolades for Radio DDR
Publication	List	Year	Rank
Paste	The 100 Best Albums of 2024	2024	24
BrooklynVegan	Top 55 Albums of 2025	2025	Listed
Pitchfork	The 50 Best Albums of 2025	2025	50
Pitchfork	The 30 Best Rock Albums of 2025	2025	23
Sound Opinions	Greg Kot's Best Albums of 2025	2025	21
Magnet	Top 30 Albums of 2025	2025	18

== Track listing ==
Track titles and lengths are adapted from Bandcamp.

Original edition
No.	Title	Length
1.	"Every Time I Hear"	2:43
2.	"Lorelei"	1:55
3.	"You Don't Live Here Anymore"	3:50
4.	"If I Was Ever Lonely"	2:21
5.	"Circle All the Dots"	3:39
6.	"Sycophant"	3:47
7.	"You Have a Way"	3:31
8.	"When You Know"	2:41
9.	"Chasing Stars"	2:53
10.	"Is It Better"	2:56
11.	"Race for the Audience"	2:56
Total length:		33:12

2025 expanded edition
No.	Title	Length
12.	"I Can't Stop"	4:10
13.	"Storma Lee"	3:35
14.	"With a Girl Like Mine"	2:04
Total length:		43:01

== Personnel ==
Credits are adapted from Bandcamp.

- Kai Slater – vocals, guitar; bass and drums except on "You Have a Way"; production, recording, artwork
- Joe Glass – bass on "You Have a Way"
- Peter Cimbalo – drums on "You Have a Way"
- Jonny Bell – mastering of original edition
- Amy Dragon – mastering of added tracks; vinyl mastering
- Braeden Long – photography
