= Still House Plants =

British band

- Genres: Post-rock; math rock; experimental rock
- Years active: 2015–present
- Members: Jess Hickie-Kallenbach, David Kennedy, Finlay Clark

Still House Plants is a British band based in London, consisting of Jess Hickie-Kallenbach (vocals), David Kennedy (drums), and Finlay Clark (guitar).

== History ==
Members of the band met at the Glasgow School of Art in 2013, and began making music together after a year. They originally went by the name 'Your Haircut', but later adopted the name 'Still House Plants' inspired by a New York artist collective and a show which they titled 'Singing For Our Houseplants'. Their early releases were put out on the experimental Glasgow label, GLARC, and were often recorded over short periods of time and with little production alteration.

In 2020, the band released their first full-length albums, Long Play and Fast Edit, under the label Bison. The sounds of these releases were inspired by jazz and rhythm-and-blues conventions, alongside garage rock. Jenn Pelly of The New Yorker noted Hickie-Kallenbach's raspy voice, Kennedy's free-jazz drumming, and the "ache and clean tones of emo" in Clark's guitar.

In 2024, they released the album If I Don't Make It, I Love U. The band received critical acclaim worldwide for the album. The work, described as post-rock with influences of soul and jazz, was praised by The Guardian particularly for Hickie-Kallenbach's vocals.

== Discography ==
=== Albums ===
- Still House Plants - 2016
- Assemblages - 2017 (last album with GLARC)
- Long Play - 2020
- Fast Edit - 2020
- If I Don't Make It, I Love U - 2024

=== Singles ===
- "Shy Song" - 2020
- "Do" - 2020
- "Able To" - 2020
- "More More Faster" - 2021
