= So Medieval =

2024 indie rock album

Studio album by Blue Bendy
- Released: 12 April 2024
- Recorded: 2023
- Studio: Hermitage Works Studios
- Genres: Indie rock, post-punk
- Length: 36:13
- Label: The State51 Conspiracy
- Producer: Nathan Ridley

Blue Bendy chronology
Motorbike (2022)	So Medieval (2024)

So Medieval is the debut album by the British indie rock band Blue Bendy, released on 12 April 2024, through the record label The State51 Conspiracy. The album employs ironic lyrics to explore such themes as morality and existential dread. Its overall genre is ambiguous, being variously described as art rock and post-punk, and some songs fitting into genres such as baroque indie and post-rock. It received generally positive reviews from critics.

== Background and release ==
Blue Bendy began in 2017 after vocalist Arthur Nolan and guitarist Joe Nash moved to London from Scunthorpe. They originally made post-punk music but soon turned more towards pop. Their first EP, Motorbike, was released in 2022. Pitchfork described it as "monologue-rock" and "handclap indie-pop".

So Medieval was released on 12 April 2024. It was preceded by the singles "Cloudy", "Mr. Bubblegum", "Come On Baby, Dig!" and "The Day I Said You'd Died (He Lives)". "Come On Baby, Dig!" was accompanied by a music video on release.

== Style and composition ==
So Medieval follows a loose narrative about the narrator becoming dedicated to his band after a break-up. According to NME, the album's lyrical style is "ironic" and "tackles the existential dread of our daily lives." There are pop culture references throughout, including a reference to Kendall Roy in the track "I'm Sorry I Left Him To Bleed". Pitchfork praised the "deadpan absurdity" of lyrics discussing "raw halloumi, a Formula One audiobook, and [...] 'shitpost sagas'". Despite its ironic lyrics, the band has stated that there is more sincerity on So Medieval than their previous work; guitarist Joe Nash stated "there are definitely more moments of being more open and disarmed, full songs as opposed to brief moments." As a whole, the album discusses themes such as wealth and morality. The tracks "Cloudy", "The Day I Said You'd Died (He Lives)", and "Come On Baby, Dig!" were partially written before the release of Blue Bendy's 2022 EP Motorbike, and were the first three songs recorded for So Medieval.

Critics disagree on the genre of So Medieval. Pitchfork describes the album as indie rock and art rock while NME describes it as post-punk. The title track opens with "delicate baroque indie", and "Cloudy" has been described as post-rock. Nolan himself stated that "genre is dead as far as we're concerned. This album is all about the death of purity, embracing contrasts and everything being a big melting pot." Many instruments are used throughout, including keys, synths, and guitars.

== Critical reception ==
Professional ratings
Review scores
Source	Rating
Clash	8/10
DIY	4/5 stars
The Line of Best Fit	8/10
NME	4/5 stars
Pitchfork	8.0/10

So Medieval has received generally positive reviews from critics. In a review for NME, Max Pilley described the album as "powered by longing, melodic riffs, but the sense of an impending cataclysm is never far away", while Roisin O'Connor from The Independent wrote that it "never feels cluttered, despite its profound cacophony of instruments." In a review for DIY, Daisy Carter stated that So Medieval "revels in its scope", describing the track "Darp" as an "undulating, guitar-led number that progresses with the steady power of a swelling wave" and its follow-up "Darp 2 / Exorcism" as "an exponential expansion that sees said wave eventually break into a moving and cathartic crescendo". The Line of Best Fit's review by Marshall Grace summarised the lyrics as "like an audiobook during a car crash" and gave the album an 8/10, which was also the score given by Clash and Pitchfork. NME and DIY both gave the album four stars out of five.

== Track listing ==
All lyrics are written by Arthur Nolan.

So Medieval track listing
No.	Title	Length
1.	"So Medieval"	3:54
2.	"Mr. Bubblegum"	4:29
3.	"Darp"	2:47
4.	"Darp 2 / Exorcism"	3:20
5.	"I'm Sorry I Left Him To Bleed"	2:47
6.	"The Day I Said You'd Died (He Lives)"	3:53
7.	"Come On Baby, Dig!"	2:49
8.	"Sunny"	1:46
9.	"Cloudy"	6:20
10.	"Goodnight Bobby"	4:08
Total length:		36:13
