= Kyshona =

American singer

Kyshona Armstrong
- Origin: Irmo, South Carolina, U.S.
- Genres: Roots; Folk; trip hop; Soul
- Occupations: Singer; songwriter; music therapist
- Years active: 2014–present
- Website: https://www.kyshona.com/

Kyshona Armstrong (known mononymously as Kyshona) is an American singer, songwriter, and music therapist based in Nashville, Tennessee. Her songs incorporate elements of roots, rock, RnB, and folk and often feature themes of liberation and community. Her discography includes multiple albums. Her song Listen gained prominence during the 2020 racial justice protests due to its "prescient" lyrics.

== Early life ==
Kyshona grew up in Irmo, South Carolina. She attended the University of Georgia, where she studied music therapy and classical music performance on the oboe.

== Career ==
=== Music therapy ===
After college, Kyshona spent 17 years as a music therapist, focusing on veterans, incarcerated and formerly incarcerated people, and the youth.

=== Music career ===
Kyshona began writing her songs with patients under her care. As a therapist, she recounts learning how to write music through working with her patients in their therapy sessions. In 2014, she moved to Nashville to pursue a career as an independent artist.

== Discography ==
=== Studio albums ===
- Music (2008)
- Home Again (2010)
- Go (2014)
- The Ride 2.0 (2017)
- Listen (2020)
- Legacy (2024)

=== Live albums ===
- Live at the Sanctuary (2021)
- "Live from The Blueroom Studios" (2025)
