= Heart of the Artichoke =

Studio album by Bloomsday
- Released: June 7, 2024
- Length: 33:17
- Label: Bayonet
- Producer: Ryan Albert

Bloomsday chronology
Place to Land (2022)	Heart of the Artichoke (2024)

Singles from Heart of the Artichoke
- 1. "Where I End and You Begin" Released: November 9, 2023; 2. "Dollar Slice" Released: March 5, 2024; 3. "Virtual Hug" Released: April 18, 2024; 4. "Artichoke" Released: May 9, 2024; 5. "Object Permanence" Released: May 9, 2024

Heart of the Artichoke is the second studio album by American indie rock musician Bloomsday. It was released on June 7, 2024, by Bayonet Records. It is preceded by the singles, "Where I End and You Begin", "Dollar Slice", "Virtual Hug", "Artichoke", and "Object Permanence".

== Background ==
Co-produced by Ryan Albert and mixed by Henry Stoehr, Heart of the Artichoke is themed around friendship. It consists of ten songs recorded in ten days. The album's first single "Where I End and You Begin" was released on November 9, 2023. Its second and third singles, "Dollar Slice" and "Virtual Hug", were released on March 5, 2024, and April 18, 2024, respectively, while the fourth and fifth singles, "Artichoke" and "Object Permanence" were released on May 9, 2024.

== Reception ==
Professional ratings
Review scores
Source	Rating
AllMusic	4/5 stars
Paste	7.5/10

Marcy Donelson of AllMusic reviewed the album, stating "The resulting material finds the songwriter still exploring the hidden corners of identity and self-reflection, the nuances of relationships including friendships, and other personal terrain, as implied by its title, Heart of the Artichoke." Paste Magazine described it as "a tapestry of acoustic melodies so full of warmth that they act like traveling companions on what would otherwise be a lonely trek."

== Track listing ==
All tracks are written by Iris Garrison-Driscoll.

No.	Title	Length
1.	"Where I End and You Begin"	3:38
2.	"Virtual Hug"	3:09
3.	"Dollar Slice"	4:35
4.	"Artichoke"	2:43
5.	"Bumper Sticker"	3:42
6.	"Night Swim"	2:56
7.	"Carefully"	3:17
8.	"Look After"	2:20
9.	"Object Permanence"	3:16
10.	"Old Friend"	3:41
Total length:		33:17

== Personnel ==
=== Musicians ===
- Iris Garrison – vocals, guitar (tracks 3–10)
- Ryan Albert – guitar, percussion (tracks 1, 2); synthesizer (1, 4, 6, 7)
- Alex Harwood – guitar (tracks 1, 3–7, 9); bass, drums (1); synthesizer (2), vocals (3, 6, 8)
- Andrew Stevens – drums (tracks 2–5, 9, 10), tambourine (3), percussion (4, 5, 8–10), keyboards (6)
- Richard Orofino – synthesizer (tracks 2, 9), vocals (3, 5, 9), guitar (9, 10), banjo (9)
- Hannah Pruzinsky – vocals (tracks 2, 3, 5, 9, 10)
- Chris Daley – bass (tracks 2, 4–6, 8–10), clarinet (6, 8)
- J. R. Bohannon – guitar (track 3)
- Maya Bon – vocals (track 3)
- Sam Weisenthal – vocals (track 3)

=== Technical ===
- Ryan Albert – production, recording
- Iris Garrison – additional production
- Alex Harwood – additional production
- Richard Orofino – additional production
- Heather Jones – mastering
- Henry Stoehr – mixing
- Nick Kinsey – additional recording
