= Blue Bendy =

British indie rock band

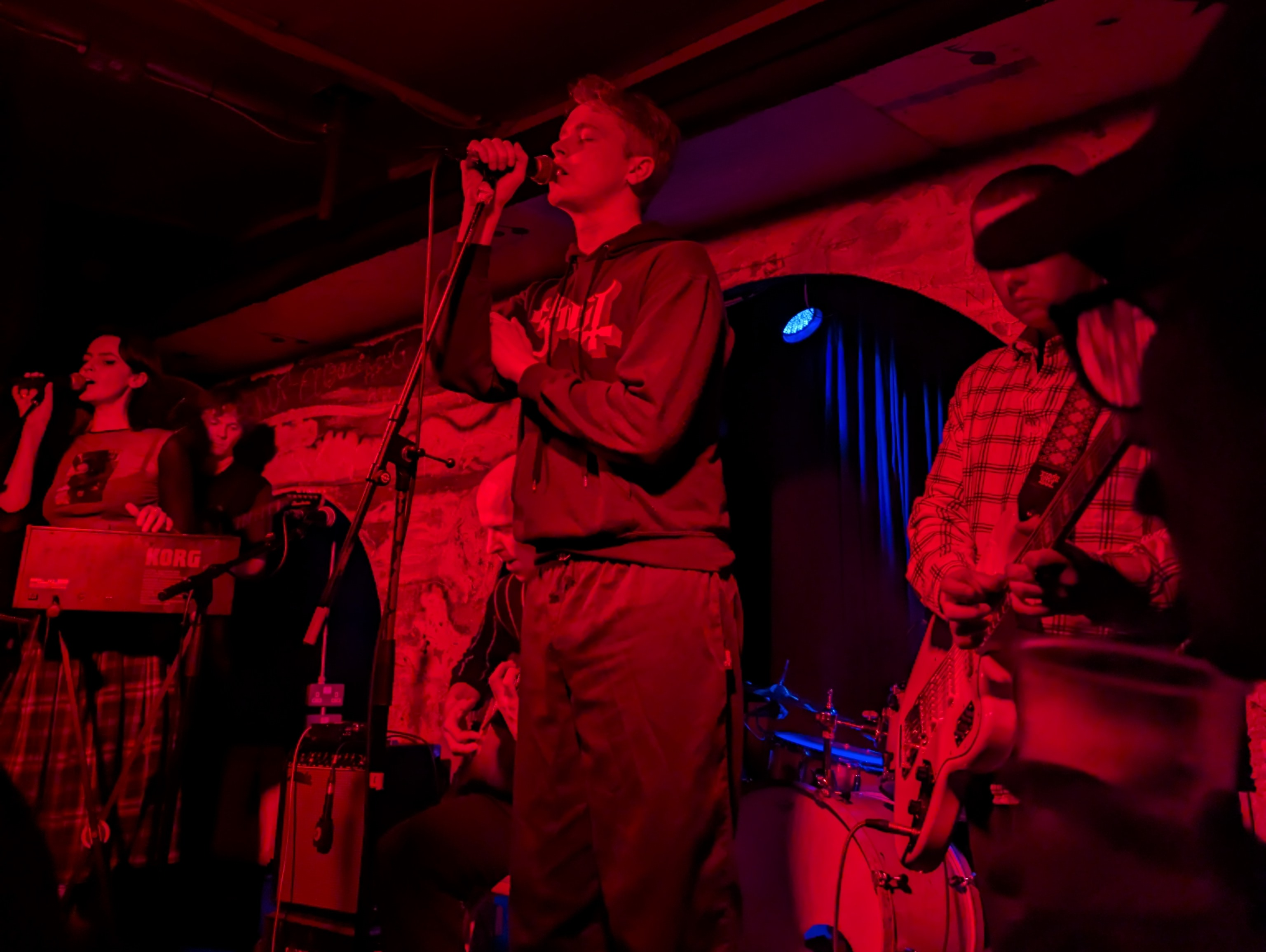
- Blue Bendy performing at Shacklewell Arms in 2023

Background information
- Origin: London, UK
- Genres: Indie rock; post-punk
- Years active: 2017–present
- Labels: Permanent Creeps; Practise Music; The State51 Conspiracy
- Members: Arthur Nolan; Dina Willcock; Joe Nash; Oliver Nolan; Olivia Morgan; Tristan Petsola
- Past members: Sam Wilson; Harrison Charles; Oscar Tebbutt
- Website: bluebendy.bandcamp.com

Blue Bendy are a British indie rock band. Starting out making post-punk music after vocalist Arthur Nolan and guitarist Joe Nash moved from Scunthorpe to London, they later gravitated towards their own style. Much of their work varies in its genre, with their debut album So Medieval switching between genres such as indie rock, post-punk, baroque indie, and post-rock.

== Career ==
=== 2017–2022: beginnings and Motorbike ===
Blue Bendy began in 2017, after vocalist Arthur Nolan and guitarist Joe Nash moved from Scunthorpe to London. They started out creating post-punk music; Nolan later told The Guardian that they were trying to emulate Wire "before post-punk got so lethargic and landfill". According to Nash, "not too much thought" went into the band name, and they "just wanted something that would catch someone's ear". After Olivia Morgan, Sam Wilson, Harrison Charles and Oscar Tebbutt joined the band, they began to shift more towards their own style.

The band avoided releasing any music until February 2019, when they released the single "Closing Sound" on the label Permanent Creeps. In August of that year they released a 1990s-inspired single, "Suspension". They released two more singles – "International" in 2020 and "Glosso Babel" in 2021 – before moving to the label Practise Music in August 2021, and releasing the single "A Celebration".

In October 2021, Blue Bendy announced their first EP, Motorbike, and simultaneously released the single "Spring 100". The four-track EP was released in February 2022; it was described by Hard of Hearing Magazine as sounding like "Pavement the band [and] pavement the surface".

In early 2022, Sam Wilson left the band, and was replaced on bass by Oliver Nolan.

=== 2023–present: So Medieval ===
In April 2023, Blue Bendy released the single "Cloudy". The next single they released was "Mr. Bubblegum" in October, also announcing they would be moving to the label The State51 Conspiracy. In January 2024, they announced their debut album, So Medieval, with the release of the single "Come On Baby, Dig!". One more single was released before the album – "The Day I Said You'd Died (He Lives)" in March.

So Medieval was released on 12 April 2024. It received generally positive reviews from critics, including an 8.0/10 from Pitchfork. Roisin O'Connor from The Independent wrote that it "never feels cluttered, despite its profound cacophony of instruments."

On 3 September 2025, Blue Bendy released the single "Poke", and announced the replacement of guitarist Harrison Charles and drummer Oscar Tebbutt with bassist Dina Willcock and drummer Tristan Petsola.

== Musical style ==
Blue Bendy are inspired by artists such as Iceage, The Grateful Dead, Suzanne Vega, and Soul II Soul, as well as the TV show Gogglebox. While they started out creating post-punk music, their EP Motorbike was described by Pitchfork as "monologue-rock" and "handclap indie-pop", and Nolan stated after the release of So Medieval that "genre is dead as far as we're concerned. [So Medieval] is all about the death of purity, embracing contrasts and everything being a big melting pot." According to Brad Harris of Hard of Hearing Magazine, the band has "become weirder and poppier and weirder and poppier". So Medieval has been described as art rock and post-punk, with the title track containing "delicate baroque indie" and the track "Cloudy" falling into the genre of post-rock.

Blue Bendy's lyrics are often ironic, with Pitchfork praising their "deadpan absurdity". Some of their songs integrate pop culture references, such as the track "I'm Sorry I Left Him To Bleed" referencing Kendall Roy. Despite their absurdity, Blue Bendy's lyrics discuss topics such as existential dread and morality.

== Members ==
=== Current members ===
All info per Pitchfork.

- Arthur Nolan – vocals
- Dina Willcock – bass
- Joseph Nash – guitar
- Oliver Nolan – guitar
- Olivia Morgan – piano, synthesiser
- Tristan Petsola – drums

=== Past members ===
- Sam Wilson – bass
- Harrison Charles – guitar
- Oscar Tebbutt – drums

== Discography ==
=== Albums ===
- So Medieval (2024)

=== EPs ===
- Motorbike (2022)

=== Singles ===
- "Closing Sound" (2019)
- "Suspension" (2019)
- "International" (2020)
- "Glosso Babel" (2021)
- "A Celebration" (2021)
- "Spring 100" (2021)
- "Cloudy" (2023)
- "Mr. Bubblegum" (2023)
- "Come On Baby, Dig!" (2024)
- "The Day I Said You'd Died (He Lives)" (2024)
- "Poke" (2025)
- "Dragonslayer" (2026)
- "Vocal Fry Academia" (2026)
