= Being Dead (band) =

- Origin: Austin, Texas
- Genres: Indie rock
- Years active: 2019–present
- Labels: Bayonet Records
- Website: beingdead.bandcamp.com

Being Dead is an American indie rock band from Austin, Texas. The group is currently signed to Bayonet Records and has released two full-length albums. The group released their first EP in 2019 titled Fame Money Death by Drive By. The group's first album, When Horses Would Run, was released in 2023 and received positive reviews. The group released their second album, Eels, in 2024 to acclaim.

== Discography ==
Studio albums

- When Horses Would Run (2023, Bayonet Records)
- Eels (2024, Bayonet Records)
