= Synthesizing the Silk Roads =

2024 compilation album

Synthesizing the Silk Roads: Uzbek Disco, Tajik Folktronica, Uyghur Rock & Tatar Jazz from 1980s Soviet Central Asia

Compilation album by Various Artists
- Released: 30 August 2024
- Length: 57:52
- Label: Ostinato Records

Synthesizing the Silk Roads: Uzbek Disco, Tajik Folktronica, Uyghur Rock & Tatar Jazz from 1980s Soviet Central Asia is a compilation album of tracks recorded in Tashkent, Uzbek SSR (now Uzbekistan) from the mid-1970s to the early 1990s. The records on Synthesizing the Silk Roads were pressed at a factory owned by the Soviet state-run record label Melodiya. The album was released by US label Ostinato Records on 30 August 2024.

== Background and release ==
In response to the Nazi invasion of the USSR in 1941, Stalin ordered a mass evacuation of people and industry eastward into the country, which eventually involved more than 16 million people. Tashkent was a particularly important destination for the evacuees, who included at one point Anna Akhmatova, Aleksey Tolstoy, and Korney Chukovsky.

Synthesizing the Silk Roads was compiled from records produced by the Tashkent Gramplastinok pressing plant, which was established by evacuees, and ran until its closure in 1991, the same year that the USSR dissolved. The tracks were recorded from the mid-1970s to the early 1990s, and selected from over 100 records belong to the private collection of Anvar Kalandarov, who approached Ostinato Records in 2023 with the idea of releasing a compilation. Ostinato founder Vik Sohonie travelled to Tashkent in the autumn of 2023, and together with Kalandarov he contacted the rights holders of the tracks, one of whom produced the original tapes that had been hidden from the authorities in the Soviet era. The album was released digitally on 30 August 2024, and on vinyl and CD on 24 September.

The Tashkent record factory was run by Melodiya, the state-owned record label of the Soviet Union. By the 1970s it was annually pressing "several million records of Uzbek, Tajik, Kazakh, Kirghiz, Turkmen, Karakalpak and Uighur folk music." Because Melodiya was not under pressure to make a profit, the musicians making records in Tashkent had significant creative freedom. However, political expression was tightly controlled – for example, the founder of the Minarets of Nessef was a Crimean Tatar and was imprisoned by the KGB for his political opinions regarding Crimea.

== Critical reception ==
Professional ratings
Review scores
| Source | Rating |
|---|---|
| Mojo | 4/5 stars |
| Songlines | 5/5 stars |
| Uncut | 8/10 |

In a review for Mojo, David Hutcheon called the compiled tracks "quite astounding, and frequently so futuristic it's hard to believe they are 40 years old." Flood Magazine wrote that the various genres featured on the compilation "sound as if they existed planets apart."

Piers Martin of Uncut compared Original's "Sen Qaidan Bilasan" to "Supernature" by Cerrone. Francis Gooding of The Wire wrote that "at least three selections here are "Voulez-Vous" derivatives."

== Track listing ==
| No. | Title | Artist (Recording year) | Length |
|---|---|---|---|
| 1. | "Aarezoo Gom Kardam (I Lost My Dream)" | Nasiba Abdullaeva (1983) | 6:30 |
| 2. | "Tantsuyushchiy Ostrov (Dancing Island)" | Angelina Petrosova (1987) | 3:09 |
| 3. | "Bu Nima Bu (What's This) (Live / Janto Koité Edit)" | Original (1990) | 3:16 |
| 4. | "Sen Qaidan Bilasan (How Do You Know)" | Original (1981) | 4:40 |
| 5. | "Paidot Kardam (Found a Sweetheart)" | Khurmo Shirinova (1985) | 4:29 |
| 6. | "Nashi Ssori (Our Quarrels)" | Natalia Nurumkhamedova (1987) | 2:49 |
| 7. | "Lola" | Bolalar (1992) | 4:09 |
| 8. | "Radost (Joy)" | Yashlik (1984) | 2:28 |
| 9. | "Instrumental" | Minarets of Nessef (1979) | 3:57 |
| 10. | "Ya Zdala Tebya (I Waited For You)" | Makhfirat Khamrakulova | 3:11 |
| 11. | "Rezaboron (Rain)" | Gulshan feat. Makhfirat Khamrakulova (1989) | 3:11 |
| 12. | "Meyhane" | Efsane (1990) | 3:51 |
| 13. | "Bu Nima Bu (Studio)" | Original (1990) | 3:37 |
| 14. | "Pomni Menya (Remember Me)" | Ariran (1976) | 3:06 |
| 15. | "Guzal (Beautiful)" | Ismail Jalilov (1974) | 5:22 |
| Total length: | | | 57:52 |

== Personnel ==
- Anvar Kalandarov, Vik Sohonie, Janto Koité – compilation, curation
- Anvar Kalandarov – project coordination
- Mike Graves (Osiris Studio) – restoration, remastering
- Pete 'Piwi' White – design
