= Eels (album) =

Studio album by Being Dead
- Released: September 27, 2024
- Genre: Garage rock
- Length: 39:40
- Label: Bayonet
- Producer: John Congleton

Being Dead chronology
When Horses Would Run (2023)	Eels (2024)

Eels is the second studio album by American rock band Being Dead. It was released on September 27, 2024, through Bayonet Records. Arriving over a year after their debut studio album, When Horses Would Run, the album was met with universal acclaim from critics.

== Background ==
The trio, consisting of Falcon Keller, Cody Dosier and Nicole Roman-Johnston, was formed in Austin, Texas and released their studio debut on July 14, 2023, entitled When Horses Would Run. Their follow-up record Eels was produced by John Congleton, who previously worked with the likes of St. Vincent, Mannequin Pussy and Explosions in the Sky. On the album, Being Dead explores themes, including "anxiety about self-worth", days wasted and the void after a "fleeting relief of hedonistic release".

== Critical reception ==
Professional ratings
Aggregate scores
Source	Rating
AnyDecentMusic?	8.0/10
Metacritic	89/100
Review scores
Source	Rating
AllMusic	4.5/5 stars
Far Out	4/5 stars
The Line of Best Fit	8/10
Paste	8.3/10
Pitchfork	8.3/10

Eels received a score of 89 out of 100 on review aggregator Metacritic based on four critics' reviews, indicating "universal acclaim". Daniel Felsenthal of Pitchfork awarded the album the accolade "Best New Music", saying that albeit their music seems "bare-bones", it includes a variety of "unexpected" instruments, such as "Mellotron, banjo, Casio drums". Felsenthal thought a recurring theme throughout the record was "motion" as it is "constantly changing" and "speeding along". They concluded that the trio remakes "the future in the image of the past".

Handing out the same score in a review for Paste, Ben Salmon praised not only their ability of "writing great songs" but to push their music into "interesting, unexpected places". Salmon calls Eels a compilation of "sharp zig-zags and even sharper hooks" and drew comparisons to artists such as Neutral Milk Hotel, Animal Collective, That Dog. and the Beach Boys. Lloyd Bolton at The Line of Best Fit called Eels "good chaos" with an overflow of "ideas" that alternate between "short-form experiments" and "more developed songs" that keeps piquing the listener's interest.

=== Year-end lists ===
Select 2024 year-end rankings for Eels
Publication/critic	Accolade	Rank	Ref.
AllMusic	AllMusic's 100 Favorite Albums of 2024	-	
Alternative Press	50 Best Albums of 2024	-	
Gorilla vs. Bear	Albums of 2024	3	
Paste	100 Best Albums of 2024	46	
Pitchfork	50 Best Albums of 2024	38	
PopMatters	80 Best Albums of 2024	17	
Uproxx	Best Albums of 2024	-	

== Track listing ==
All tracks are written by Being Dead.

Eels track listing
No.	Title	Length
1.	"Godzilla Rises"	2:47
2.	"Van Goes"	3:33
3.	"Blanket of My Bone"	3:13
4.	"Problems"	3:41
5.	"Firefighters"	4:30
6.	"Dragons II"	2:00
7.	"Nightvision"	2:55
8.	"Gazing at Footwear"	2:17
9.	"Big Bovine"	2:49
10.	"Storybook Bay"	0:33
11.	"Ballerina"	1:49
12.	"Rock n' Roll Hurts"	2:08
13.	"Love Machine"	2:03
14.	"I Was a Tunnel"	1:00
15.	"Goodnight"	3:36
16.	"Lilypad Lane"	0:46
Total length:		39:40
