= Bloomsday (musician) =

American indie rock musician

Bloomsday is the stage name of American indie rock musician Iris James Garrison. The project previously was a duo which included Alex Harwood, but is now just Garrison.

== History ==
The duo formed in 2019. The following year, the duo recorded their debut album, during the COVID-19 pandemic. The album, Place to Land, was released in 2022 on Bayonet Records. In 2024, Bloomsday announced their second full-length album, Heart of the Artichoke, as a solo release of just Garrison. Along with the album announcement, Bloomsday released a single titled "Dollar Slice". Also prior to the albums release, Bloomsday released the singles Artichoke, Object Permanence, and Virtual Hug. The album received positive reviews. Bloomsday announced a tour in support of the album with Mali Velasquez for the fall of 2024.
