= 2024 in Canadian music =

The following musical events and releases that happened in 2024 in Canada.

== Notable events ==
- March 24 - Juno Awards of 2024
- April 6-7 - 19th Canadian Folk Music Awards
- June 25 - Prism Prize
- September 5 - Following the premiere of the documentary series The Tragically Hip: No Dress Rehearsal at the 2024 Toronto International Film Festival, Daveed Goldman and Nobu Adilman of Choir! Choir! Choir! lead a public singalong of Tragically Hip songs "Grace, Too", "Ahead by a Century" and "Bobcaygeon".
- September 14 - 2024 Canadian Country Music Awards
- September 17 - Jeremy Dutcher wins the 2024 Polaris Music Prize for his album Motewolonuwok, becoming the first artist in the history of the award to win it twice.
- September 28 - Tom Cochrane, Jim Cuddy, Greg Keelor, Sarah McLachlan and Diane Tell are inducted into the Canadian Songwriters Hall of Fame.
- October 18 - Harmony Hall, a new concert venue repurposing the historic Vandorf Community Hall in Vandorf, Ontario, launched with a grand opening concert headlined by Brendan Canning.
- November 3 - 46th Félix Awards

== Albums released ==
=== A ===
- Aerialists, I Lost My Heart on Friday
- Jeremie Albino, Our Time in the Sun - November 1
- Allie X, Girl with No Face - February 23
- Tenille Arts, To Be Honest - May 3
- Julie Aubé, Boiling Over - April 5

=== B ===
- Tim Baker, Full Rainbow of Light - November 15
- Jill Barber, Encore! - June 14
- Quinton Barnes, Have Mercy on Me
- Begonia, Open Swim - July 17
- Laila Biali, Wintersongs - November 1
- Bibi Club, Feu de garde - May 10
- Big Brave, A Chaos of Flowers - April 19
- Black Atlass, I'll Meet You There - March 8
- Boy Golden, For Eden - July 19
- Les Breastfeeders, La ville engloutie - November 8
- The Burning Hell, Hardly Working - March 29
- Spencer Burton, North Wind - January 26

=== C ===
- Cadence Weapon, Rollercoaster - April 19
- Cherie Camp, Love and Blood - May 30
- Charlotte Cardin, A Week in Nashville - May 17
- Celeigh Cardinal, Boundless Possibilities - June 21
- Caribou, Honey - October 4
- Jennifer Castle, Camelot - November 1
- Ramon Chicharron, Niebla
- Chromeo, Adult Contemporary - February 16
- Cindy Lee, Diamond Jubilee - March 29
- Clairmont the Second, They said it would rain... - October 31
- Terri Clark, Terri Clark: Take Two - May 31
- Classified, Luke's View - April 26
- Clever Hopes, New Kind of Familiar
- Comeback Kid, Trouble - March 15
- Corridor, Mimi - April 26
- Les Cowboys Fringants, Pub Royal - April 25
- Cuff the Duke, Breaking Dawn - September 6

=== D ===
- Les Dales Hawerchuk, Attaque à cinq - November 8
- Maïa Davies, Lovers' Gothic
- Dax, From a Man's Perspective - December 6
- The Dead South, Chains & Stakes - February 9
- Dear Rouge, Lonesome High - September 13
- The Deep Dark Woods, Broadside Ballads Vol. III - May 1
- D.O.A., No Escape from What You Are - November 15
- Mike Downes, The Way In - March 1
- Alan Doyle, Welcome Home - February 9
- Ducks Ltd., Harm's Way - February 9

=== E ===
- Thompson Egbo-Egbo, Oddly Familiar, Vol. 2
- Ekkstacy, Ekkstacy - January 19
- Elephant Stone, Back Into the Dream - February 23
- Elliott Brood, Country - April 12
- Lindsay Ell, Love Myself - October 25
- Ellis, No Place That Feels Like - April 26

=== F ===
- Michael Feuerstack, Eternity Mongers - April 19
- Flore Laurentienne, 8 tableaux - March 1
- Sue Foley, One Guitar Woman - March 29
- Fredz, Demain il fera beau
- Fucked Up, Another Day - August 9
- Nelly Furtado, 7 - September 20

=== G ===
- Dana Gavanski, Late Slap - April 5
- Ghostkeeper, Cîpayak Joy - August 28
- Ghostly Kisses, Darkroom - May 17
- Godspeed You! Black Emperor, No Title as of 13 February 2024 28,340 Dead - October 4
- Good Kid, Good Kid 4 - March 27
- Great Lake Swimmers, In Pieces: An Acoustic Retrospective - October 4
- Grievous Angels, Last Call for Cinderella - May 4

=== H ===
- Lynne Hanson, Just a Poet - May 24
- Kyp Harness, Kick the Dust - April 26
- Coleman Hell, Joyride - May 17
- The Henrys, Secular Hymns and Border Songs - November 1
- High Valley, Small Town Somethin' - February 2
- Homeshake, CD Wallet - March 8
- Honeymoon Suite, Alive - February 16
- Joshua Hyslop, Evergold - April 26

=== I ===
- iskwē, nīna - April 12
- Islands, What Occurs - June 21

=== J ===
- Japandroids, Fate & Alcohol - October 18
- Nick Johnston, Child of Bliss - March 8
- Jutes, Sleepyhead - December 16

=== K ===
- k-os, Atlantis+ (expanded edition reissue of 2006 album Atlantis: Hymns for Disco) - May 3
- Michael Kaeshammer, Turn It Up - March 1
- Kaia Kater, Strange Medicine - May 17
- Kaytranada, Timeless - June 7
- Mia Kelly, To Be Clear
- Keysha Freshh, Pretty Boys Break My Heart - August 16
- Kiesza, Dancing and Crying: Vol. 1 - May 24
- Kittie, Fire - June 21
- Kalsey Kulyk, Outlaw Poetry - February 23

=== L ===
- Matt Lang, All Night Longer - May 10
- Abigail Lapell, Anniversary - May 10
- Richard Laviolette, All Wild Things Are Shy - September 5
- Leahy, Live in Concert - October 25
- Lemon Bucket Orkestra, Cuckoo - May 17
- Simon Leoza, Acte III - March 22
- Exco Levi, Born To Be Free - March 1
- Luna Li, When a Thought Grows Wings - August 23
- Lenka Lichtenberg, Feel with Blood - November 1
- Brianna Lizotte, Winston & I
- Kellie Loder, Transitions - April 19
- Loony, Loony - March 22
- Wyatt C. Louis, Chandler - May 24
- Loving, Any Light - February 9
- Lubalin, haha no worries - December 6
- Corb Lund, El Viejo - February 23

=== M ===
- Dan Mangan, Being Elsewhere Mix - August 30
- Marianas Trench, Haven - August 30
- Cory Marks, Sorry for Nothing - December 6
- Loreena McKennitt, The Road Back Home - March 8
- Jon McKiel, Hex - May 3
- Shawn Mendes, Shawn - November 15
- Madeline Merlo, One House Down (from the Girl Next Door) - October 11
- Metz, Up on Gravity Hill - April 12
- Ruth Moody, Wanderer - May 17
- Ryland Moranz, Better/Worse - November 15
- Pamela Morgan, White Fleet Suite - November 8
- Mother Mother, Grief Chapter - February 16
- Mustafa, Dunya - September 27
- David Myles, Devil Talking - May 24

=== N ===
- Nap Eyes, The Neon Gate - October 18
- Nemahsis, Verbathim - September 13
- Sarah Neufeld, Richard Reed Parry and Rebecca Foon, First Sounds - November 1
- Justin Nozuka, Chlorine - September 20
- Nyssa, Shake Me Where I'm Foolish - February 1

=== O ===
- Ryan Ofei, Restore
- Jordan Officer, Like Never Before - June 27
- Old Man Luedecke, She Told Me Where to Go - May 24
- OMBIIGIZI, Shame - November 1
- The Once, Out Here - February 16
- Robyn Ottolini, Growing Up to Do - January 14

=== P ===
- Dorothea Paas, Think of Mist - November 15
- Packs, Melt the Honey - January 19
- Diana Panton, Soft Winds and Roses - October 25
- PartyNextDoor, PartyNextDoor 4 - April 26
- Orville Peck, Stampede - August 2
- Klô Pelgag, Abracadabra - October 11
- Joel Plaskett, One Real Reveal - September 13
- Poolblood, theres_plenty_of_music_to_go_around.zip - April 5
- MacKenzie Porter, Nobody's Born with a Broken Heart - April 26
- Aaron Pritchett, Demolition - July 5
- Priyanka, Devastatia - August 23

=== R ===
- Allan Rayman, The All Allan Hour - April 26
- Owen Riegling, Bruce County (From the Beginning) - November 1
- Josh Ross, Complicated - March 29
- Royal Tusk, Altruistic - February 23

=== S ===
- Sarahmée, Pleure pas ma fille, sinon Maman va pleurer - October 29
- Saukrates, Bad Addiction - December 6
- Philip Sayce, The Wolves Are Coming - February 23
- Talia Schlanger, Grace for the Going - February 2
- The Secret Beach, We Were Born Here, What's Your Excuse?
- Mike Shabb, Sewaside III
- Snotty Nose Rez Kids, Red Future - September 13
- Softcult, Heaven - May 24
- Vera Sola, Peacemaker - February 2
- Colin Stetson, the love it took to leave you - September 13
- Jeffery Straker, Great Big Sky
- The Strumbellas, Part Time Believer - February 9
- Sum 41, Heaven :x: Hell - March 29
- Sunset Rubdown, Always Happy to Explode - September 20
- Sykamore, Through the Static - March 29

=== T ===
- Julian Taylor, Pathways - September 27
- T. Thomason, Tenderness - October 25
- Thousand Foot Krutch, The End Is Where We Begin (Reignited) - July 26
- Devin Townsend, PowerNerd - October 25
- The Tragically Hip, Up to Here (expanded 35th anniversary reissue) - November 8
- Andrina Turenne, Je suis un arbre
- Twin Flames, Hugging the Cactus - October 18

=== V ===
- Jake Vaadeland, Retro Man...More and More
- Dom Vallie, See You When I See You
- Menno Versteeg, Why We Run - December 13
- Vision Eternel, Echoes from Forgotten Hearts - February 14
- Leif Vollebekk, Revelation - September 27

=== W ===
- Skye Wallace, The Act of Living - November 1
- Ruby Waters, What's the Point - May 31
- We Are Wolves, NADA - November 8
- Rick White and The Sadies, Rick White and the Sadies - June 7
- Wild Rivers, Better Now - October 18
- Charlotte Day Wilson, Cyan Blue - May 3
- Royal Wood, Memory Lane (Rarities & B-Sides)
- Tia Wood, Pretty Red Bird
- Donovan Woods, Things Were Never Good If They're Not Good Now - July 12

=== Y ===
- Jonah Yano, Jonah Yano & the Heavy Loop - October 4
- Yoo Doo Right, The Sacred Fuck - March 15
- Yoo Doo Right, From the Heights of Our Pastureland - November 8
- Neil Young and Crazy Horse, Fuckin' Up - April 26

=== Z ===
- Zeina, Eastend Confessions

== Deaths ==
- January 17 - Serge Laprade, singer and radio broadcaster
- February 17 - Greg "Fritz" Hinz, rock drummer (Helix)
- February 28 - Jean-Pierre Isaac, lyricist, composer, DJ, recording studio owner and a music producer
- March 3 - Eleanor Collins, jazz singer and TV host
- March 12 - Russ Wilson, rock bass guitarist (Junkhouse)
- April 5 - Phil Nimmons, jazz clarinetist, composer, bandleader, and educator
- April 8 - Jon Card, rock drummer (Personality Crisis, SNFU, D.O.A., The Subhumans)
- April 27 - Jean-Pierre Ferland, singer-songwriter
- May 14 - Mélanie Renaud, singer-songwriter
- May 29 - Cayouche, singer-songwriter
- June 25 - Ray St. Germain, country singer and television host
- July 23 - Devon, rapper
- August 26 - Paul Dwayne, country singer-songwriter
- October 2 - Ken Tobias, singer-songwriter
- November 6 - Angus Walker, bluegrass and country entertainer
