= Japandroids discography =

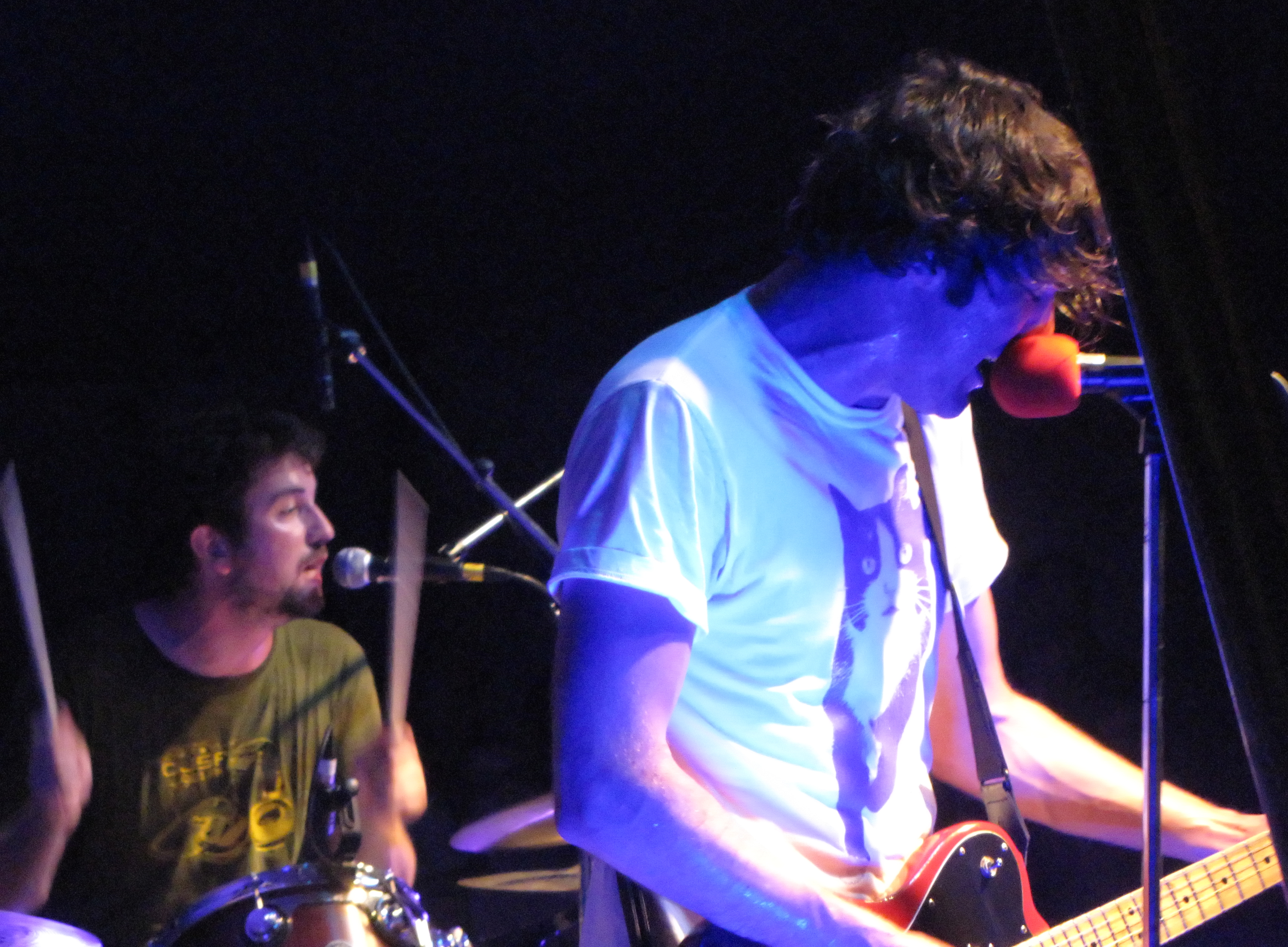
- Japandroids in concert at the Hillside Festival in 2010
- Studio albums: 4
- Extended plays: 2
- Compilation albums: 1
- Singles: 10

The discography of Canadian rock band Japandroids consists of four studio albums, one compilation album, two extended plays, ten singles, and two music videos.

After self-releasing two EPs, Japandroids signed to independent Canadian label Unfamiliar Records. Their debut album, Post-Nothing, was released in Canada on April 28, 2009. Pitchfork awarded 'Best New Music' to both the album and lead single "Young Hearts Spark Fire", helping to expose the band to a large audience outside of Canada. Japandroids were subsequently signed to Polyvinyl, who re-released the album worldwide on August 4, 2009. Many of the un-included tracks that the duo had written for the album were later recorded and released in 2010 as series of limited edition 7" singles. These tracks include "Art Czars", "Younger Us", and "Heavenward Grand Prix". The same year, Japandroids re-released their first two EPs as a compilation titled No Singles.

Japandroids' second album, Celebration Rock, was released by Polyvinyl on June 5, 2012, preceded by a limited edition 7" of the album's first single "The House That Heaven Built". The album was released to widespread critical acclaim, appearing on many year-end best-of lists. The Globe and Mail named it the best Canadian album of 2012, while CBC declared it the best rock album of the year, later ranking it #91 on its list of The 100 Greatest Canadian Albums Ever. Their third album, Near to the Wild Heart of Life, was released on January 27, 2017, by ANTI-.

== Albums ==
=== Studio albums ===
Title	Album details	Peak chart positions							
Title	Album details	CAN	AUS Hit.	GER	SCO	UK Rec.	UK Indie	US	US Indie
Post-Nothing	Label: Polyvinyl; Released: 28 April 2009; Formats: CD, CS, LP, Digital	—	—	—	—	—	—	— (Note: Post-Nothing did not enter the US Billboard 200, but peaked at number 22 on the US Heatseekers Albums Chart.)	—
Celebration Rock	Label: Polyvinyl; Released: 5 June 2012; Formats: CD, CS, LP, Digital	—	12	—	—	27	38	37	7
Near to the Wild Heart of Life	Label: ANTI-, Arts & Crafts; Released: 27 January 2017; Formats: CD, LP, Digital	49	—	73	90	11	25	76	7
Fate & Alcohol	Label: ANTI-, Arts & Crafts; Released: 18 October 2024; Formats: CD, LP, Digital	—	—	—	—	—	—	—	—
"—" denotes album that did not chart or was not released

=== Compilation albums ===
Title	Album details	Peak chart positions
Title	Album details	US Heat
No Singles	Label: Polyvinyl; Released: 11 May 2010; Formats: CD, LP, Digital	33
"—" denotes album that did not chart or was not released

== Extended plays ==
Title	EP details	Comments
All Lies	Label: Self-released; Released: May 2007; Formats: CD	Independently released and limited to 500 copies.; Re-released as part of No Singles compilation.
Lullaby Death Jams	Label: Self-released; Released: January 2008; Formats: CD	Independently released and limited to 500 copies.; Re-released as part of No Singles compilation.

== Singles ==
Year	Song	Peak chart positions				Album
Year	Song	CAN Rock	MEX Air.	UK Sales	US Sales	Album
2009	"Young Hearts Spark Fire"	—	—	—	—	Post-Nothing
2009	"Wet Hair"	—	—	—	—	Post-Nothing
2010	"Art Czars"	—	—	—	—	Non-album single
2010	"Younger Us"	—	—	—	23	Celebration Rock
2010	"Heavenward Grand Prix"	—	—	85	—	Non-album single
2012	"The House That Heaven Built"	12	44	19	22	Celebration Rock
2012	"The Nights of Wine and Roses"	33	38	—	—	Celebration Rock
2017	"Near to the Wild Heart of Life"	9	43	—	1	Near to the Wild Heart of Life
2017	"No Known Drink or Drug"	—	—	—	—	Near to the Wild Heart of Life
2017	"North East South West"	28	—	—	—	Near to the Wild Heart of Life
"—" denotes album that did not chart or was not released

== Music videos ==
Year	Title	Director
2012	"The House That Heaven Built"	Jim Larson
2017	"North East South West"	Jim Larson
