= Near to the Wild Heart of Life =

Studio album by Japandroids
- Released: January 27, 2017
- Recorded: 2015–2016
- Studios: Rain City Recorders; Vancouver, BC, Canada
- Genres: Punk rock; alternative rock
- Length: 36:49
- Labels: Anti- (Worldwide); A&C CA (Canada); A&C MX (Mexico)
- Producer: Japandroids

Japandroids chronology
Celebration Rock (2012)	Near to the Wild Heart of Life (2017)	Massey Fucking Hall (2020)

Singles from Near to the Wild Heart of Life
- 1. "Near to the Wild Heart of Life" Released: November 2, 2016; 2. "No Known Drink or Drug" Released: January 10, 2017; 3. "North East South West" Released: May 16, 2017

Near to the Wild Heart of Life is the third studio album by the Canadian rock duo Japandroids, released on January 27, 2017, by ANTI-. Described by the band as their first attempt at making a "proper studio album", it features a more polished aesthetic than their previous releases.

With band members living in separate cities for the first time, the album was written over the course of a year during sessions in Vancouver, Toronto, New Orleans, and Mexico City. It was recorded by longtime engineer Jesse Gander and mixed by Peter Katis. The album produced three singles: “Near to the Wild Heart of Life”, “No Known Drink or Drug”, and “North East South West”.

== Background ==
Japandroids toured for nearly two years in support of their second album, Celebration Rock (2012). Following the end of the Celebration Rock Tour, the duo decided to take an extended break from the band. In an interview with The Independent, King cited exhaustion as the primary motivation:

When we got home, we were just totally destroyed, really burnt out both physically and mentally; at that point, we hadn't taken a serious break from the band in five years. So we took about six months off – the first half of 2014 – and decided to dedicate that time to ourselves and our personal lives.

In late 2014, the band reconvened in New Orleans to begin writing new material: "We rented a house and spent about five weeks there, with all the gear in the living room, just playing every day. We hadn't written anything in a long time, so it took a minute just to get the ball rolling again." The duo, now living in separate cities, would spend the next year writing together via similar sessions. The album was recorded in the fall of 2015 with longtime engineer Jesse Gander, but wasn’t mixed until the following spring. The band attributed wanting to work with Peter Katis as one of the primary reasons for the album's delayed release: "We really wanted Peter Katis, who’s well known for working with bands like The National and Interpol, to mix our record, but we had to wait around a little while in order to work with him."

== Recording ==
The album features a more polished aesthetic in comparison to its predecessors Post-Nothing (2009) and Celebration Rock (2012). King explained:

When we started the band ten years ago, we were really into a lot of raw and live sounding records by garage rock bands; records that sounded like shows. That’s the kind of band we wanted to be, and those were the kind of records we wanted to make. After we finished Celebration Rock, we felt like we’d achieved that. When it came time to make this record, we didn’t feel like we could push the songs or the band any further in that direction; we felt like we'd already done it and there was nowhere left to go.

The band allowed themselves more time in the studio than usual in order to experiment with overdubs, as well as guitar effects, loops, and synthesizers. Prowse explained, “We wanted to make a more sonically diverse record, to explore different sounds. There was a lot of talk about having greater dynamic range on this album, like quieter parts vs louder parts. Same thing with tempos, having some songs that were a little slower and not just balls to the wall the entire time.” The band has described every song on this album as having its own “sonic world”. Prowse elaborated, “There are different guitar tones and textures from song-to-song, and the drum sound changes a fair amount among other things. There’s a lot more care put into arrangements and a lot of sonic flourishes that we'd never experimented with before.”

Near to the Wild Heart of Life continues the band's tradition of having eight-song albums, with King noting, "We did actually try to do more this time. It wasn't like, 'Oh we'll just do eight again.' We wrote and recorded more songs, but when it came time to put it all together, it was the same thing as before. You take one off here, another one there, and it just kind of glues itself together.”

== Writing and composition ==
Beginning in 2014, King and Prowse lived in separate cities for the first time, with King splitting his time between Toronto and Mexico City, while Prowse remained in their hometown of Vancouver. According to the band, living in separate cities "totally transformed the way [they] write and work." They began the writing process by sending each other song ideas via Dropbox: "It was a pretty profound change for both of us and the band was basically forced to figure out a new way of writing. [...] We would spend time apart and be communicating via email and stuff like that, then meeting in whatever city we decided to work on it and put it together. A very, very different writing style than our first two records."

=== Music ===
Critic Stuart Berman described Near to the Wild Heart of Life as Japandroids' "most accessible record to date", commenting "At their core, Japandroids are still very much a band that writes valorous songs about living for the moment and loving for a lifetime. But the anxious, slash-and-burn abandon of old has matured into a steadier hand and confident poise; the gritty surface buffed away for a radio-ready polish; the duo’s minimalism blown open to absorb the infinite possibilities of the recording studio. For the first time on a Japandroids record, there are prominent acoustic guitars. And synthesizers. And a shoegaze ballad. And, in centerpiece track 'Arc of Bar', a seven-minute, Haçienda-bound psych-disco epic." On the evolution of the band's music, Prowse stated:

As far as being a band that is drums, guitar, and vocals, who's energetic and records in a very simplistic way (so that it sounds like a great live recording), it's hard for us to imagine being able to do that better than we did on Celebration Rock. We'd kind of put together a formula by that point, and it just wasn't interesting or inspiring for us to make another record by cranking up the amps, bashing away on the drums, and doing a whole album of full-blown rockers with a slightly slower song at the end. We really wanted to experiment with different ways of writing songs, see what we could pull off as a two-piece.

=== Lyrics ===
King has repeatedly cited both Tom Waits and Townes Van Zandt as major influences on the album: "Lyrically, this album was heavily influenced by both Tom Waits and Townes Van Zandt, as they were the two artists that I listened to the most during the past few years, and whose sense of storytelling I tried to emulate in my own songwriting." Regarding their influence, he stated: "When you're listening to great songwriters, who know how to build a story and have characters in songs that you care about, you can't help but be influenced by it and I definitely noticed a shift in the way I wrote lyrics on this record."

As Joe Coscarelli of The New York Times noted, "Once content to make greasy, direct and triumphant major-chord anthems about girls, drinking and other forms of escape, the band pushes deeper and wider, especially lyrically, in new songs, weighing what it means to have dedicated a life to such pursuits." On the evolution of his lyrics, King stated: "I'd never say that I'd 'found my voice', but I think that I've discovered a way that I write that I like and I've become comfortable with that. I don't or can't write in the way that a lot of the great artists that I love are able to write. It just comes down to embracing your own personal idiosyncrasies."

Ahead of the album's release, King curated a playlist for Rolling Stone specifically of the album's influences, stating that these were the artists that they were "listening to and thinking about" while writing the album, and that they were particularly influential in terms of the album's lyrics and themes. It included songs by Bob Dylan, Neil Young, Emmylou Harris, Gil Scott-Heron, Marianne Faithfull, Patti Smith, Mick Harvey, and Game Theory amongst others.

Regarding the lyrical content of the album's second track, "North East South West", King noted, "Between those four years on Celebration Rock, we traveled the world. We went to a lot of places. We met a lot of people. We had a lot of experiences. Instead of making an album about that, which I kind of did on Celebration Rock, I thought I'm just going to condense it all as best I can into one song. That's what that song is. It's almost getting that part of my writing out of that way. The rest of the album is based in the present."

=== Title ===
The title Near to the Wild Heart of Life is a reference to the 1943 novel Near to the Wild Heart (Perto do Coração Selvagem) by Clarice Lispector, whose title is itself a reference to the 1916 novel A Portrait of the Artist as a Young Man by James Joyce. In an interview with National Public Radio (NPR), King explained the title:

There's a novel by Clarice Lispector, the Brazilian author, called Near To The Wild Heart. And I was reading that book several years ago and really, really loved the book. And sometime later, I found out that she took the title from a quote in a James Joyce novel A Portrait Of The Artist As A Young Man. What I really liked about the expression was the 'near to' part of it — because 'the wild heart of life' sort of implies one thing — but 'near to the wild heart of life' sort of implies something else. I think everybody has these moments in their lives where they go through significant changes — maybe they move cities, or maybe they change jobs, or they start a new relationship or they end a relationship — and everybody's chasing this thing and I don't really think anyone ever quite gets there. That's a really non-poetic way of describing life, but just that idea of whatever it is you're chasing, you're near to it, but you're never really there.

== Release and promotion ==
Near To The Wild Heart Of Life Tour
- World tour by Japandroids
- Location: North America; Europe; Oceania
- Start date: October 5, 2016; Vancouver, Canada
- End date: October 17, 2018; Toronto, Canada
- Legs: 12
- No. of shows: 152; North America (92); Europe (45); Oceania (15)

Japandroids concert chronology
- Celebration Rock Tour (2012-2013); Near To The Wild Heart Of Life Tour (2016-2018)

On October 31, 2016, Japandroids announced their third album Near to the Wild Heart of Life via a teaser video featuring live footage from their 4-night stand at The Cobalt in Vancouver. On November 2, 2016, it was confirmed that the album would be released by Anti- on January 27, 2017, and preceded by a limited edition 7" of the album's title track. When asked about the motivation behind switching labels, King stated:

It just felt like a very natural thing to do, and at a very natural time. Celebration Rock (and the Celebration Rock Tour) felt like a triumphant ending to the first era of the band, an era (and in particular, a sound) that I will forever associate with Polyvinyl. But starting in 2014, I think both Dave and I felt that we were no longer ‘continuing’ something but starting something new, and wanted a new label to represent whatever that was.

According to the band, Anti- came to their attention following a chance encounter with one of their staff members at a bar in New Orleans. On choosing to sign with them specifically, Prowse stated:

We really love Polyvinyl and they were very, very good to us. That was a very hard decision to make to move to Anti-, or not so much move to Anti-, but to not be with Polyvinyl anymore. When the opportunity arose to be on a label like Anti-, you just look at the roster they have and the length of time that artists stay on that label, and all the success that the artists have had… you look at Tom Waits or Neko Case or Nick Cave, etc. It’s just really hard to say no to that. They seem to share the kind of philosophy about how to negotiate art and commerce in a way that we can understand and agree with and still have complete creative control.

On January 10, 2017, "No Known Drink or Drug" was released digitally to promote the album ahead of its release. On January 19, 2017, Near to the Wild Heart of Life was streamed in its entirety on NPR Music in the United States and on CBC Music in Canada. On January 31, 2017, the band performed "Near to the Wild Heart of Life" on The Late Show with Stephen Colbert and on May 9, 2017, performed "Near to the Wild Heart of Life", "True Love and a Free Life of Free Will", and "Midnight To Morning" on Later... with Jools Holland. On May 16, 2017, a limited edition 7" of the album's second single "North East South West" was released. On October 11, 2017, the band performed "No Known Drink Or Drug" on Late Night with Seth Meyers. On October 24, 2017, Japandroids’ show at Massey Hall in Toronto was filmed and recorded for the concert film series Live At Massey Hall. The film was released on June 14, 2018.

=== Music video ===
A video for "North East South West" was released in September to promote the single. The video was directed by Jim Larson, who had previously directed their video for "The House That Heaven Built". Conceived as a sequel to that video, it also documents one week in the life of Japandroids on tour, this time in Europe. Filmed primarily in Spain, Italy, and Portugal during their spring 2017 European tour, the video includes tour footage from Barcelona, Venice, Padua, Milan, and Porto, as well as live footage from their three performances at Primavera Sound.

=== Tour ===
Japandroids toured heavily in support of Near to the Wild Heart of Life, performing over 150 shows in 23 countries between October 2016 and October 2018. The Near to the Wild Heart of Life Tour consisted of 12 individual legs across North America, Europe, and Oceania, including numerous festival appearances: South by Southwest, Shaky Knees Music Festival, Sasquatch!, Governors Ball, Pitchfork Music Festival, and Foo Fighters’ Cal Jam in the United States, Reading and Leeds Festivals, Latitude, End of the Road, Electric Picnic, Primavera Sound, Paredes de Coura, NOS Alive in Europe, Corona Capital in Mexico, and Meredith Music Festival in Australia.

== Reception ==
=== Critical reception ===
Professional ratings
Aggregate scores
Source	Rating
Metacritic	79/100
Review scores
Source	Rating
AllMusic	3.5/5 stars
The A.V. Club	A−
The Guardian	4/5 stars
Pitchfork	7.1/10
Rolling Stone	4/5 stars
Tiny Mix Tapes	2.5/5 marks

Near to the Wild Heart of Life received mostly positive reviews from contemporary music critics. At Metacritic, which assigns a normalized rating out of 100 to reviews from mainstream critics, the album received an average score of 79, based on 32 reviews, which indicates "generally favorable reviews".

In a mostly positive review for AllMusic, Stephen Thomas Erlewine praised Japandroids' decision to expand upon their sound: "Near to the Wild Heart of Life contains a few new production flourishes, particularly a hint of synthesizers, which means that it sounds even bigger than Celebration Rock, but that should've been expected, too, from these students of rock & roll. Bands usually swing for the fences on their third album and that's precisely what Japandroids do here." In another positive review for Rolling Stone, Will Hermes praises drummer David Prowse's contributions and the album's anthemic nature: "With guitars soaring and grooves accelerating, the words feel undeniable, and you know that when you hear 'em in a club – or theater, or arena – you'll be bouncing off the walls, shouting every word." Similarly, Kate Hutchinson wrote in The Guardian: "Their third album, is so luxuriously gnarled it roars out of the speakers like the Revenant bear. The duo have nailed the art of the crunching, life-affirming crescendo. [...] Their whoa-oh refrains will slay at festivals this summer. Feelings sound so good cranked up to 11." In another positive review, The A.V. Club's Kyle Ryan praised the band's ability to remain idiosyncratic while expanding on its aesthetic: "Near To The Wild Heart Of Life remains a Japandroids album — even with 'Arc Of Bar' riding washes of synthesizers for seven and a half minutes at the halfway point. The band has expanded its sound while hewing close to what it does best."

In a mixed review for Pitchfork, Matthew Ramirez noted, "Perhaps it's age, experience, a new record label, the inevitable artistic instinct to want to switch things up a little, but whatever the reason, Near to the Wild Heart of Life ultimately lacks the urgency of the band's best music. The tower hasn't collapsed, but it's starting to wobble." In a negative review for Tiny Mix Tapes, writer S. David said, "The energy imparted simply can't overcome a drowning of influences, or rather, the kinetic is overcome by the potential. Japandroids have always courted classic-cum-punk signification and appraisal, and it seems they haven't moved past their eager acceptance of those overtures."

== Track listing ==
All tracks are written by Japandroids.

No.	Title	Length
1.	"Near to the Wild Heart of Life"	4:57
2.	"North East South West"	4:21
3.	"True Love and a Free Life of Free Will"	4:27
4.	"I'm Sorry (For Not Finding You Sooner)"	2:29
5.	"Arc of Bar"	7:25
6.	"Midnight to Morning"	4:44
7.	"No Known Drink or Drug"	3:12
8.	"In a Body Like a Grave"	5:14

== Singles ==
- "Near to the Wild Heart of Life" (November 2, 2016)
  - 7" single b/w: "Love → Building on Fire" (Talking Heads cover)
- "North East South West" (May 16, 2017)
  - 7" single b/w: "Fire In The Western World" (Dead Moon cover)

== Personnel ==
Japandroids

- Brian King – guitar, lead vocals (1,2,3,4,5,7,8), backup vocals (6)
- David Prowse – drums, backup vocals (1,2,5,8), lead vocals (6)

Additional musicians

- Louise Burns – backup vocals (5)
- Melissa Gregerson – backup vocals (5)
- Olga Straffon – backup vocals (5)

Technical

- Jesse Gander – engineering, production (1,2,4,5,6,7,8)
- Damian Taylor – engineering, production (3)
- Peter Katis – mixing, additional production
- Greg Giorgio – mixing assistant
- Greg Calbi – mastering

== Charts ==
Chart performance
Chart (2017)	Peak position
Australian Hitseekers Albums (ARIA)	4
Canadian Albums (Billboard)	49
German Albums (Offizielle Top 100)	73
New Zealand Heatseekers Albums (RMNZ)	5
Scottish Albums (Official Charts)	90
UK Independent Albums (Official Charts)	25
US Billboard 200	76
US Independent Albums (Billboard)	7
US Indie Store Album Sales (Billboard)	2
US Top Alternative Albums (Billboard)	11
US Top Rock Albums (Billboard)	12
