= Massey Fucking Hall =

Live album by Japandroids
- Released: June 26, 2020
- Recorded: October 24, 2017
- Venue: Massey Hall; Toronto, ON, Canada
- Length: 1:03:35
- Label: Anti-
- Producer: Japandroids

Japandroids chronology
Near to the Wild Heart of Life (2017)	Massey Fucking Hall (2020)	Fate & Alcohol (2024)

Singles from Massey Fucking Hall
- 1. "Heart Sweats" Released: May 27, 2020

Professional ratings
Aggregate scores
Source	Rating
Metacritic	68/100
Review scores
Source	Rating
Albumism	4.5/5 stars
Exclaim!	8/10
The Line of Best Fit	7/10
Pitchfork	5.5/10
Under the Radar	7.5/10

Massey Fucking Hall is a live album by Canadian rock band Japandroids, released on June 26, 2020 by ANTI-. It was recorded on October 24, 2017 at Massey Hall in Toronto during the Near to the Wild Heart of Life Tour.

== Background ==
Japandroids' third album, Near to the Wild Heart of Life, was released on January 27, 2017. The band toured heavily in support of the album, performing over 150 shows in 23 countries between October 2016 and October 2018.

On October 24, 2017, roughly halfway through the Near to the Wild Heart of Life Tour, their show at Massey Hall in Toronto was filmed and recorded for the concert film series Live At Massey Hall. The film was released on June 14, 2018.

== Release ==
On May 27, 2020, Japandroids announced that their first live album Massey Fucking Hall would be released by Anti- on June 19, 2020 (digital) and October 2, 2020 (vinyl). The announcement came during the height of the COVID-19 pandemic, when virtually all live concerts and music festivals across North America were either canceled or postponed. On the timing of the release, drummer David Prowse stated:

I really, really miss live shows. I miss playing them and I miss being in the crowd. When you love music, there are few things more uplifting and cathartic than being in a room full of people at a show. To not have that opportunity to experience live music together with a group of people has been a hard adjustment. It’s disorienting and makes me sad to think about. I hope that in some small way people who are feeling similarly can find some solace in this record. They can hear the crowd and listen to us having the time of our lives at a historic venue and maybe that makes life a little easier for a minute, and reminds them that those moments will happen again down the road.

On June 10, 2020, it was announced that the digital release date had been pushed back to June 26, 2020 out of respect for Juneteenth, with the band stating that they "didn't want to take up space on such an important day".

== Reception ==
Massey Fucking Hall was met with "generally favorable" reviews from critics. At Metacritic, which assigns a weighted average rating out of 100 to reviews from mainstream publications, this release received an average score of 68, based on 5 reviews. Aggregator Album of the Year gave the album a 72 out of 100 based on a critical consensus of 8 reviews.

== Track listing ==
All tracks are written by Japandroids.

No.	Title	Length
1.	"Intro: Near to the Wild Heart of Life"	0:53
2.	"Near to the Wild Heart of Life"	4:37
3.	"Fire's Highway"	4:41
4.	"Heart Sweats"	6:04
5.	"Arc of Bar"	8:15
6.	"Intro: Younger Us"	0:32
7.	"Younger Us"	4:07
8.	"North East South West"	4:26
9.	"The Nights of Wine and Roses"	4:26
10.	"Intro: No Known Drink or Drug"	0:33
11.	"No Known Drink or Drug"	3:39
12.	"Continuous Thunder"	4:35
13.	"Young Hearts Spark Fire"	6:03
14.	"Sovereignty"	3:36
15.	"Intro: The House That Heaven Built"	0:50
16.	"The House That Heaven Built"	6:18
Total length:		01:03:35

== Personnel ==
Japandroids

- Brian King – guitar, lead vocals
- David Prowse – drums, backup vocals
