= All Lies =

All Lies may refer to:

- All Lies (EP), an EP by Japandroids
- "All Lies" (song), a song by Charli Baltimore
- All Lies (film), a 1938 German comedy film
