= Days of Wine and Roses =

Days of Wine and Roses may refer to:

- "Days of wine and roses", a phrase from the 1896 poem "Vitae Summa Brevis" by Ernest Dowson
- Days of Wine and Roses (Playhouse 90), a 1958 teleplay by JP Miller
- Days of Wine and Roses (film), a 1962 film with a screnplay adaptated from the teleplay
- "Days of Wine and Roses" (song), from the film, by Henry Mancini and Johnny Mercer
- Days of Wine and Roses (musical), a 2023 musical adaptation of the film
- Pat Boone Sings Days of Wine and Roses, a 1963 album by Pat Boone
- Days of Wine and Roses and Other TV Requests, a 1963 album by Andy Williams
- The Days of Wine and Roses, a 1982 album by The Dream Syndicate
- Days of Wine and Roses - Live at the Jazz Standard, a 2000 jazz album by the Maria Schneider Orchestra

== See also ==
- "Naïve / The Days of Swine & Roses", a 1991 split single by KMFDM and My Life with the Thrill Kill Kult
- "Days of Wine and D'oh'ses", a 2000 episode of The Simpsons
- "The Nights of Wine and Roses", a 2012 song by Japandroids
- "Wine and Roses", an episode of Schitt's Creek, 2015
- "Wine and Roses", a 2022 episode of Better Call Saul
- Wine and Roses (poetry collection), a 1911 collection of poetry by Victor Daley
