= Hex (Jon McKiel album) =

Studio album by Jon McKiel
- Released: May 3, 2024
- Genre: Indie folk; neo-psychedelia
- Length: 33:07
- Language: English
- Label: You've Changed
- Producer: Jay Crocker; Jon McKiel

Jon McKiel chronology
Bobby Joe Hope (2020)	Hex (2024)

Professional ratings
Aggregate scores
Source	Rating
Metacritic	80/100
Review scores
Source	Rating
Pitchfork	7.6/10
Loud And Quiet	8/10

Hex is a 2024 studio album by Canadian singer-songwriter Jon McKiel. It has received positive reviews from critics.

== Reception ==
Alex Hudson of Exclaim! made this his staff pick album, writing that it "evokes the feeling of a bygone era without being constrained by its tropes", continuing that "even as McKiel crafts an approximation of brill building pop and Beatnik folk, his psychedelic guitar noodling and dense patchwork of percussive layers mean that Hex exists enigmatically out of time". At Loud and Quiet, Janne Oinonen rated Hex an 8 out of 10, stating that "the quality control never wavers" on an album that "offers a hugely compelling testimonial to the enduring creative potential of an imaginatively distorted pop song". Editors at Pitchfork scored this release 7.6 out of 10 and critic Stephen M. Deusner praised the mix of genres and influences on this album stating that it "seems both familiar and foreign", ending his review stating that "McKiel finds humanity in a bit of confusion, and on this oddly affecting album he comes across as a medium, closely attuned to the unknown and unknowable as he deciphers missives from another plane". In Spill Magazine, Adam Collings rated this album an 8 out of 10, calling it "a strong release with meticulous care being evident in its delivery".

In a May 31 roundup of the best albums of the year, editors at Exclaim! ranked this 16 with Penelope Stevens stating that music is "a brilliant approximation of our dystopian reality [that] is at once modern and timeless". A June 3 review of the best albums of the year in Spin included Hex and Stephen Deusner stated that "it's an album heavy with vibe, simultaneously hypnotic and askew, drawing you in to keep you beautifully off balance".

The album was a longlisted nominee for the 2024 Polaris Music Prize.

== Track listing ==
All songs written by Jon McKiel, except where noted.

1. "Hex" – 3:09
2. "String" – 4:36
3. "Still Life" – 3:43
4. "The Fix" – 3:20
5. "Under Burden" – 2:16
6. "Memory Screen pt. 1" – 1:45
7. "Everlee" – 2:53
8. "Lady's Mantle" – 2:37
9. "Concrete Sea" (Terry Jacks) – 2:35
10. "Memory Screen pt. 2" – 6:07

== Personnel ==
- Jon McKiel – instrumentation, vocals, recording, production
- Jay Crocker – instrumentation, recording, production
- Paul Henderson – artwork, design
- Harris Newman – audio mastering
- Nicola Miller – saxophone on "Hex"

== See also ==
- 2024 in Canadian music
- List of 2024 albums
