= Melt the Honey =

Studio album by Packs
- Released: January 19, 2024
- Recorded: March 2023
- Studio: Casa Pulpo, Xalapa, Mexico
- Genre: Indie rock; lo-fi; slacker rock; grunge pop
- Length: 28:26
- Label: Fire Talk

Packs chronology
| Crispy Crunchy Nothing (2023) | Melt the Honey (2024) |

Melt the Honey is the third album by the Canadian indie rock band Packs, released on January 19, 2024, through Fire Talk. It was recorded in Mexico in March 2023, and received positive reviews from critics.

== Background and recording ==
Packs spent three weeks rehearsing and recording the album at Casa Pulpo in Xalapa, Mexico in March 2023; frontwoman Madeline Link had previously done an artist residency in the country in 2020. The album's writing was influenced by Link being in a relationship and moving in with her partner, as well as the warm climate and local architecture.

== Critical reception ==
Professional ratings
Aggregate scores
| Source | Rating |
|---|---|
| Metacritic | 73/100 |
Review scores
| Source | Rating |
| AllMusic | 3.5/5 stars |
| Exclaim! | 8/10 |
| MusicOMH | 3/5 stars |
| No Ripcord | 6/10 |
| Paste | 7.5/10 |
| Pitchfork | 7.3/10 |

Melt the Honey received a score of 73 out of 100 on review aggregator Metacritic based on six critics' reviews, indicating "generally favorable" reception. Marcy Donelson of AllMusic found it to be "still fractured and generally discombobulated, but the subject matter is a bit lighter and the vibe more copacetic than previous releases" and wrote that Madeline Link has "a sharp ear for hooks, quirky phrasing tendencies, and visceral, spontaneous-sounding accompaniment". Sophie Noel of Exclaim! noted the album's "scrappy tangibility" and "hazy slacker rock with catchy melodies and psych-y breakdowns", which she felt made it "an approachable and endearing listen".

Paste's Grace Ann Natanawan wrote that the album "sonically smooths out the edges while retaining Packs' trademark lo-fi grit", finding it to be "evident that the band is set on continually experimenting with their sound". Reviewing the album for No Ripcord, Juan Eduardo Rodriguez opined that "using minimal resources, the band delivers raw, unfettered performances that feel authentic". MusicOMH's John Murphy stated that while Link's "talent is in making the mundane seem compelling", "sometimes it all feels a bit too laidback for its own good" as "you get the impression that Packs as a band are still figuring out their sound". Pitchfork's Zach Schonfeld wrote that on Melt the Honey, "Link squeezes out lazily hooky, lo-fi bangers as likely to draw lyrical inspiration from 19th-century literary arcana as from her personal life".

== Track listing ==
All tracks are written by Madeline Link.

Melt the Honey track listing
| No. | Title | Length |
|---|---|---|
| 1. | "89 Days" | 2:42 |
| 2. | "Honey" | 2:36 |
| 3. | "Pearly Whites" | 2:34 |
| 4. | "HFCS" | 2:22 |
| 5. | "AmyW" | 2:11 |
| 6. | "Take Care" | 3:27 |
| 7. | "Her Garden" | 2:43 |
| 8. | "Paige Machine" | 2:40 |
| 9. | "Missy" (featuring Tormentatropica) | 2:02 |
| 10. | "Trippin" | 2:25 |
| 11. | "Time Loop" | 2:44 |
| Total length: | | 28:26 |

== Personnel ==
Packs

- Shane Hooper – lead guitar, recording (all tracks); keyboards (track 6)
- Madeline Link – vocals, rhythm guitar, acoustic guitar, "rusty nail", mixing, recording, album design
- Dexter Nash – drums, tambourine, shaker, mixing, engineering, recording
- Noah O'Neil – bass guitar, recording

Additional contributors

- Sarah Register – mastering
- Carlee Diamond – front and back cover photos
- Diego Parragué – keyboards (tracks 2, 5)
- Lupita Rico – vocals (track 9)
