= Post-Nothing =

Studio album by Japandroids
- Released: 28 April 2009
- Recorded: June–July 2008
- Studio: The Hive Creative Labs; Vancouver, BC, Canada
- Genre: Punk rock; indie rock; slacker rock; noise pop; garage rock
- Length: 35:44
- Label: Unfamiliar (original); Polyvinyl (re-release)
- Producer: Japandroids

Japandroids chronology
Post-Nothing (2009)	No Singles (2010)

Singles from Post-Nothing
- 1. "Young Hearts Spark Fire" Released: 9 March 2009; 2. "Wet Hair" Released: 20 July 2009

Post-Nothing is the debut studio album by Canadian rock duo Japandroids. Originally released in Canada on 28 April 2009, by Unfamiliar Records. Pitchfork awarded 'Best New Music' to both the album and lead single "Young Hearts Spark Fire", helping to expose the band to a large audience outside of Canada. Japandroids were later signed to Polyvinyl, who re-released the album worldwide on 4 August 2009.

== Background ==
The band self-financed the recording of Post-Nothing in the summer of 2008, with the intention of self-releasing it in 2009. However, by the fall of 2008, King and Prowse had become convinced that the band was going nowhere, and mutually decided to call it quits at the end of the year. It was agreed that they would self-release the album early in 2009, but would not promote it.

In January 2009, Japandroids signed to independent Canadian label Unfamiliar Records, who were eager to release the album, despite the band's reservations about continuing. Frustrated by label interest only after they had decided to break-up, King and Prowse reluctantly agreed to continue Japandroids temporarily, and began performing live again. In March 2009, taste-making website Pitchfork awarded the song "Young Hearts Spark Fire" a 'Best New Music' designation, instantly exposing the band to a large audience outside of Canada.

Brian King would later state in 2013 during an interview with Vice that "Shitgaze" was one of the titles they had considered before settling on Post-Nothing.

== Music and lyrics ==
Chris Morgan of Yardbarker assessed the style on Post-Nothing: "While Vampire Weekend were taking indie in one direction, Japandroids went down a completely different path. The duo was loud, sloppy and infectious. They yelped out lengthy songs about being young and partying. Post-Nothing [...] brought some of the lo-fi, DIY fire back to indie."

== Release and promotion ==
Post-Nothing Tour
- World tour by Japandroids
- Location: North America; Europe
- Start date: 13 June 2009; Vancouver, Canada
- End date: 27 October 2010; Hoboken, NJ, USA
- Legs: 9
- No. of shows: 229; North America (164); Europe (65)

Japandroids concert chronology
- Post-Nothing Tour (2009-2010); Celebration Rock Tour (2012-2013)

Post-Nothing was released in Canada on 28 April 2009, by Unfamiliar Records, originally on vinyl only (Unfamiliar had offered to press Post-Nothing on either CD or LP, but not both, with the band opting for an LP release). Pitchfork immediately championed the album, awarding it a 'Best New Music' designation, and praising its rawness, energy and reckless abandon. Japandroids were subsequently signed to Polyvinyl Record Co. in June 2009. On 16 June 2009, Japandroids recorded a live in-studio session at KEXP in Seattle. On 20 July 2009, "Wet Hair" was released as a single in Europe to promote the album ahead of its release, as well as Japandroids’ first-ever European tour. The album was re-released worldwide by Polyvinyl on 4 August 2009.

In October, 2009, Japandroids performed their first-ever shows in the UK with a 4-night stand in London, including an in-store performance at Rough Trade East. On January 4, 2010, Japandroids made their television debut, performing the song "Wet Hair" on Late Night with Jimmy Fallon. In March, 2010, the band made their first of many SXSW appearances, performing 8 shows over 4 days in Austin. On 16 April 2010, the band recorded an episode of Morning Becomes Eclectic at KCRW in Los Angeles, which included a 6-song live in-studio performance. On 16 June 2010, the band performed "Young Hearts Spark Fire", "Art Czars", and "Younger Us" on MTV Live. On 15 August 2010, Japandroids’ show at The Fonda Theatre in Hollywood was filmed by Last Call with Carson Daly, with their performances of "Young Hearts Spark Fire" and "Art Czars" airing during episodes on 30 September 2010, and 16 November 2010, respectively.

=== Tour ===
Japandroids toured extensively to promote the album, earning praise for their energetic live performances. The Post-Nothing Tour consisted of 9 individual legs, and included over 200 shows in more than 20 countries. While primarily headlining their own shows, Japandroids also supporting acts such as A Place To Bury Strangers and Health in Europe, and The Walkmen in North America.

Following a handful of warm-up shows in Vancouver and an appearance at CMW in Toronto, Japandroids' first full-scale North American tour was originally scheduled to begin on 23 April 2009, in Calgary. After performing one show, they were forced to postpone and reschedule the remainder of the tour due to a health emergency. On the morning of 24 April 2009, King was checked into Calgary's Foothills Medical Center to undergo emergency surgery for a life-threatening perforated ulcer. Touring resumed 13 June 2009 after King's recovery with a performance at Vancouver's Music Waste festival, and continued uninterrupted through to the final show 27 October 2010 at Maxwell's in Hoboken, New Jersey.

The Post-Nothing Tour informally ended with two performances at Schubas Tavern in Chicago, on 31 December 2010, and 1 January 2011. Following these performances, Japandroids returned to Vancouver to begin work on their second album, and did not perform live again until August 2011.

Among the dates of the Post-Nothing Tour were numerous festival appearances, including Sled Island, North by Northeast, Pop Montreal, Hillside Festival, Osheaga Festival, and Halifax Pop Explosion in Canada, Pitchfork Music Festival, Siren Music Festival, South by Southwest, Sasquatch!, Bonnaroo, Bumbershoot, Musicfest NW, and Capitol Hill Block Party in the United States, and The Great Escape, Roskilde, Pohoda Festival, Hove Festival and Primavera Sound in Europe.

=== 7"s ===
Initially, the band had desired to include several more tracks on the album, but were unable due to insufficient funds. Many of the un-included tracks that the duo had written for the album were later recorded and released in 2010 as series of limited edition 7" singles. These tracks include "Art Czars", "Younger Us", and "Heavenward Grand Prix". In an interview with The Village Voice, King explained the concept, and how the Post-Nothing Tour affected their release:

When we recorded our album, we had a bunch of other songs at different stages of completion. I’m a fan of very cohesive albums, that sound like a certain time and place, and I didn’t want our second album to be made up of songs that we wrote in 2007 or 2008, songs didn’t make it onto Post-Nothing. So if we didn’t record them now, it felt like they were just going to die. And I didn’t really want that to happen, because we play them in our set and we like them a lot. So this was a way for some of those songs to live rather than die. Once we started touring heavily, we knew that there was no way to record a second album until we actually stopped and came home for a good chunk of time. But the more we toured, the more opportunities we got to continue touring, and we just couldn’t say no. So we thought, at the very least, whenever we came home for a week or two, we could try to record a seven-inch single. It was our way of having new music trickle out in spite of all that touring.

Japandroids had originally planned to release five singles, but abandoned the project after only three in order to focus on writing and recording their second album. A fourth 7" single, their final for Polyvinyl, was eventually released on 15 May 2012, for "The House That Heaven Built", the lead single from their second album Celebration Rock.

== Reception ==
Professional ratings
Aggregate scores
Source	Rating
AnyDecentMusic?	6.7/10
Metacritic	82/100
Review scores
Source	Rating
AllMusic	4/5 stars
The A.V. Club	A
Chicago Sun-Times	3.5/4 stars
Entertainment Weekly	B
Los Angeles Times	3.5/4 stars
NME	8/10
Pitchfork	8.3/10
Rolling Stone	3.5/5 stars
Slant Magazine	5/5 stars
Spin	7/10

Post-Nothing was released to critical acclaim in Canada, with Exclaim! naming it the second best album of 2009. The album was long-listed for the Polaris Music Prize and nominated for Alternative Album of the Year at the Juno Awards.

The album was also well-received internationally. Tom Edwards in NME described it as "a gale-force riot, a virtual tempest of joyous abandon". Matthew Cole in Slant Magazine said that Post-Nothing "positively compels repeat listens". Daniel Ross in The Quietus described the album as "noise, positivity, and a ramshackle sense of togetherness". He picked out "Young Hearts Spark Fire" as "a potent juxtaposition of two brands of chaos, romantic and existential". Ian Cohen wrote in Pitchfork that "much of Post-Nothing ... doesn't need to be analyzed or even understood to be felt". Cohen noted a theme of distance. A BBC review summarised the album: "Beguilingly direct yet leaving imagination to fill in the gaps, it's the level of unspoken unknowns that will keep you coming back for more, time and time again."

The album peaked at number 22 on the Billboard Top Heatseekers Albums chart. It appeared on many year-end lists, including those of Pitchfork (#15), Spin (#16), NME (#39), The A.V. Club (#25), PopMatters (#35), and Stereogum (#21).

== Track listing ==
All tracks are written by Japandroids (Brian King and David Prowse).

CD/LP edition
No.	Title	Length
1.	"The Boys Are Leaving Town"	4:01
2.	"Young Hearts Spark Fire"	5:05
3.	"Wet Hair"	3:12
4.	"Rockers East Vancouver"	4:32
5.	"Heart Sweats"	4:25
6.	"Crazy/Forever"	6:04
7.	"Sovereignty"	3:34
8.	"I Quit Girls"	4:55

== Singles ==
- "Young Hearts Spark Fire" (9 March 2009)
  - Digital download (US)
- "Wet Hair" (20 July 2009)
  - Digital download (UK/EU)
  - CD single b/w: "Young Hearts Spark Fire" (UK/EU)

== Personnel ==
Japandroids

- Brian King – guitar, lead vocals (1,2,3,5,6,7,8), backup vocals (4)
- David Prowse – drums, backup vocals (1,2,3,5,6,7), lead vocals (4)

Technical personnel

- Jesse Gander – engineering
