= Ellis (musician) =

Canadian musician

Ellis is the stage name of Hamilton, Ontario based dream pop musician Linnea Siggelkow.

== Early life ==
Siggelkow's mother was a piano teacher. Siggelkow learned how to play guitar at age 12 after watching the music video for Avril Lavigne's song "Complicated."

== Career ==
After uploading some GarageBand demos online, Siggelkow garnered the attention of Palehound and Soccer Mommy, who both invited her to open for them on their respective tours. On January 22, 2020, Siggelkow announced plans to release her debut album titled Born Again on April 3, 2020. The album was released on Fat Possum.

== Discography ==
=== Studio albums ===
- Born Again (Fat Possum, 2020)
- No Place That Feels Like (2024)
