= Mélanie Renaud =

Canadian singer (1982–2024)

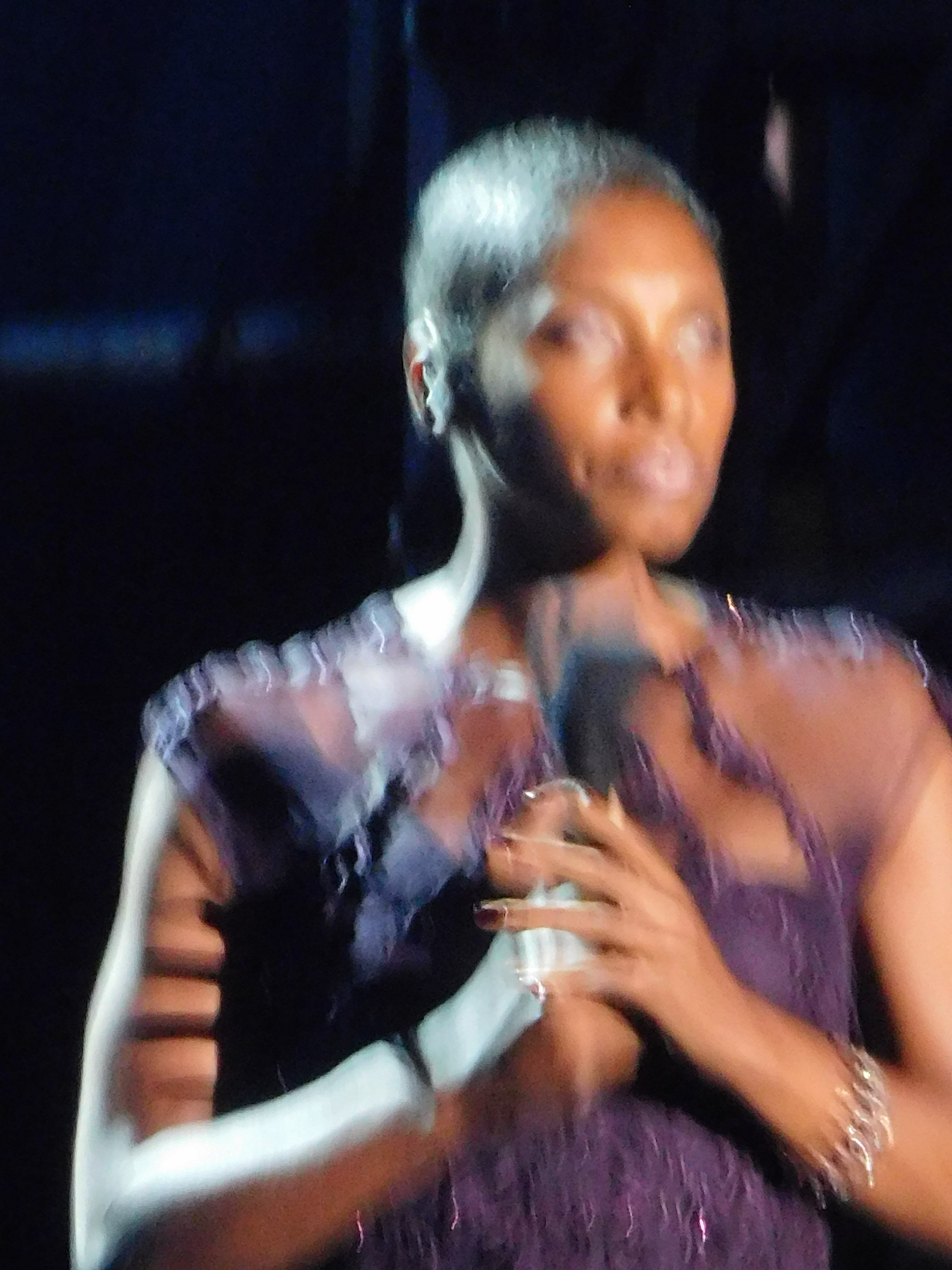
- Renaud in 2017
- Born: 9 September 1981; Haiti
- Died: May 14, 2024 (aged 42); La Prairie, Quebec, Canada
- Occupations: Singer-songwriter, stage actress

Mélanie Renaud (9 September 1981 – 14 May 2024) was a Haitian-born Canadian singer-songwriter and musical theatre actress.

== Life and career ==
Renaud was born on 9 September 1981 in Haiti, and was adopted by a couple from Quebec when she was 8 months old. After serving as a backing singer for other artists including the group Rainmen and Éric Lapointe, she made her solo debut in 2001, with the album Ma Liberté, which got her the award for best French-speaking album at the 2002 Canadian Independent Music Award and a Félix prize for revelation of the year. During her career she recorded five albums and appeared in several stage musicals, notably being chosen in 2004 by Luc Plamondon to play Esmeralda in Notre-Dame de Paris.

Renaud was diagnosed with ovarian cancer in 2016. She died on 14 May 2024, aged 42.

== Discography ==
Albums

- 2001: Ma Liberté
- 2005: Mélanie Renaud
- 2008: Feux d'artifice
- 2012: What's Going On
- 2017: Fil de fer
