= Royal Tusk =

Canadian rock band

- Origin: Edmonton, Alberta, Canada
- Genres: Heavy metal, hard rock
- Years active: 2013–present
- Labels: eOne, MapleMusic, Hidden Pony
- Members: Daniel Carriere; Sandy MacKinnon; Quinn Cyrankiewicz
- Past members: Mike James; Calen Stuckel

Royal Tusk is a Canadian rock band from Edmonton, Alberta, Canada, consisting of Daniel Carriere (vocals), Quinn Cyrankiewicz (guitar) and Sandy MacKinnon (bass).

== History ==
=== 2011–2014: Origins and Mountain ===
The band formed in 2011 in Edmonton, in the shadow of Carriere and MacKinnon's previous band, Ten Second Epic. They started writing songs for their debut EP, Mountain. The EP was recorded in Edmonton in 2014, and released by Canadian independent record label Hidden Pony Records. The single Shadow of Love from the EP received airplay in local radio stations.

=== 2015–2017: DealBreaker ===
After minimal touring off of the success of their EP, the band started to record their first album. DealBreaker was released on May 26, 2016. The album spawned two singles, 'Fever' and 'Curse the Weather.' Fever received music video treatment, but Curse the Weather did not.

=== 2018–2021: Tusk II and breakthrough ===
In 2018, the band released their sophomore album with their new label, Entertainment One Music. Tusk II was released on October 25, 2018. The first single from the album, Aftermath, was released earlier in the month, peaked at #36 on the Billboard Mainstream Rock Charts. The music video for Aftermath was directed by Evan Owen Dennis, and was released on October 4, 2018. The album's third single, Die Knowing's music video was directed by Keenan Kirk and was released on January 20, 2019.

=== 2021–Present ===
The band released new singles "All My Life" and "Head Up" on July 7 and August 25, 2023 respectively. The music video for "Head Up" was directed by Travis Nesbitt, and was released on the same day as the single itself.

In 2025, Stony Plain-based artist Keenan Gregory won a Juno Award for his design for Royal Tusk's 2024 album Altruistic.

== Band members ==
=== Current ===
- Daniel Carriere – vocals, rhythm guitar (2013–present)
- Quinn Cyrankiewicz – lead guitar, backing vocals (2013–present)
- Sandy MacKinnon – bass, backing vocals (2013–present)

=== Former ===
- Mike James – keyboards, guitars (2013–2016)
- Calen Stuckel – drums (2013–2020)

Timeline

== Discography ==
=== Albums ===
- DealBreaker (2016)
- Tusk II (2018)
- Altruistic (2024)

EP

● Mountain (2014)

=== Singles ===
- "Shadow of Love" (2014)
- "Smoke Rings" (2014)
- "Fever" (2016)
- "Curse the Weather" (2016)
- "Aftermath" (2018)
- "Reflection" (2019)
- "First Time" (2019)
- "Die Knowing" (2020)
- "All My Life" (2023)
- "Head Up" (2023)

=== Charting singles ===
Title	Year	Peak chart positions		Album
Title	Year	US Main. Rock	CAN. Rock	Album
"Shadow of Love"	2014	—	37	Mountain
"Aftermath"	2018	32	24	Tusk II
"First Time"	2019	—	13	Tusk II
"Die Knowing"	2020	—	30	Tusk II
"Head Up"	2024		4	Altruistic
"Hated"	2025		12	Altruistic

=== Music videos ===
Year	Video	Director
2014	"Shadow of Love"	Royal Tusk
2014	"Smoke Rings"	harv
2016	"Fever"	Travis Nesbitt
2018	"Aftermath"	Evan Owen Dennis
2019	"Reflection"	Keenan Kirk
2020	"Die Knowing"	Keenan Kirk
2023	"Head Up"	Travis Nesbitt
2024	"Hated"	Travis Nesbitt
