= Yoo Doo Right (band) =

Canadian post-rock band

Yoo Doo Right is a Canadian post-rock band from Montreal, Quebec. Named after the Can song "Yoo Doo Right", the band's music is influenced by krautrock and shoegaze styles.

The band, consisting of Justin Cober on guitars, synthesizers and vocals and John Talbot on drums and percussion, released its debut album Don’t Think You Can Escape Your Purpose in 2021, and followed up with A Murmur, Boundless to the East in 2022 and by From the Heights of Our Pastureland in 2024.

A Murmur, Boundless to the East was longlisted for the 2023 Polaris Music Prize, and From the Heights of Our Pastureland was longlisted for the 2025 Polaris Music Prize.

== Discography ==
=== Albums ===
Don't Think You Can Escape Your Purpose

- Released: May 21, 2021
- Format: LP, CD, Digital
- Label: Mothland

A Murmur, Boundless to the East

- Released: June 10, 2022
- Format: LP, Digital
- Label: Mothland

From the Heights of Our Pastureland

- Released: November 8, 2024
- Format: LP, CD, Digital
- Label: Mothland

=== EPs ===
Nobody Panicked and Everybody Got On

- Released: December 3, 2016
- Format: CS, Digital
- Label: Second Best Records

EP2

- Released: June 20, 2017
- Format: Digital
- Label: Second Best Records

The Sacred Fuck

- Released: March 15, 2024
- Format: CS, Digital
- Label: Mothland

=== Singles ===
"The Moral Compass of a Self-Driving Car"

- Released: July 12, 2019
- Format: Digital
- Label: Self-released

Acid Mothers Temple & The Melting Paraiso UFO / Yoo Doo Right (Split single with Acid Mothers Temple)

- Released: June 5, 2020
- Format: Vinyl 7", Digital
- Label: Mothland
- Singles: "Speed Guru"
