= Celebration Rock =

Studio album by Japandroids
- Released: May 29, 2012
- Recorded: 2010–2011
- Studios: The Hive Creative Labs, Vancouver
- Genres: Punk rock; pop punk; alternative rock; indie rock; garage punk; noise pop
- Length: 35:10
- Label: Polyvinyl
- Producer: Japandroids

Japandroids chronology
No Singles (2010)	Celebration Rock (2012)	Near to the Wild Heart of Life (2017)

Singles from Celebration Rock
- 1. "The House That Heaven Built" Released: May 15, 2012

Celebration Rock is the second studio album by Canadian rock duo Japandroids, released on June 5, 2012, by Polyvinyl. Recorded in Vancouver with Post-Nothing engineer Jesse Gander, the band aspired to capture the spirit and energy of their live shows, thus forgoing standard studio techniques such as double tracking and overdubbing, while consciously taking into account the perceived reaction of their audience to hearing the songs live in concert.

The album was released to widespread acclaim from critics, who praised its blending of classic rock and punk rock influences. The Globe and Mail named it the best Canadian album of 2012, while CBC declared it the best rock album of the year, later ranking it #91 on its list of The 100 Greatest Canadian Albums Ever. The album was also well received internationally, with Rolling Stone calling it one of The 10 Coolest Summer Albums of All Time, and Spin naming the duo Band of the Year. Pitchfork later recognized Celebration Rock as one of best albums of the 2010s, describing it as "the most beautiful, life-affirming rock record of the decade".

== Background ==
Japandroids toured extensively in support of their first album, performing over 200 shows in more than 20 countries between June 2009 and October 2010. Following two New Year's shows December 31 and January 1 at Schubas Tavern in Chicago, the band decided to discontinue touring in support of Post-Nothing, and return to Vancouver to begin work on a new album.

After taking the bulk of 2011 off to work on new material, Japandroids revealed that they would tour North America with Bass Drum of Death throughout August and September playing primarily smaller, intimate venues in order to test out their new material prior to the recording of their second album. During these shows, the band debuted several new songs including "Fire's Highway,"", "Adrenaline Nightshift", and "Evil's Sway".

Following the tour, the band temporarily relocated from Vancouver to Nashville to continue writing. The duo cited disillusion with Vancouver, as well as the difficulty of returning to a sedentary lifestyle following two years of continuous touring, as the primary motivations for the move. Both "The House That Heaven Built" and "Continuous Thunder" were written during this period.

== Recording ==
The album was recorded in Vancouver with Post-Nothing engineer Jesse Gander. The band has said they intended for the album to capture the spirit and energy of their live shows, thus foregoing standard studio techniques such as double tracking and overdubbing, while consciously taking into account the perceived reaction of their audience to hearing the songs live in concert. On recording the album, guitarist Brian King said "Technically speaking, the process for recording Celebration Rock was almost identical to that of our previous records: same studio, same engineer, same equipment, same techniques, etc. To me, the progression lies in the songwriting, the captured performances, and the mixing/production of the album, all of which are simply reflections of our shared knowledge and experience since recording Post-Nothing."

In an interview with Pitchfork, drummer Dave Prowse cited Appetite for Destruction as a specific influence on the album's sequencing. Rather than having a traditional ‘Side A’ and ‘Side B’ structure, Appetite For Destruction is split into ‘G’ and ‘R’ sides: the former 'Gun' side dealing with violence and debauchery (‘Welcome To The Jungle’, ‘Paradise City’), while the latter 'Roses' side focused on love and sex (‘Sweet Child o' Mine’, ‘Rocket Queen’). As King further explained, "We had this idea of the album having two sides, where [like Appetite For Destruction] ‘Side A’ is super-intense and ‘Side B’ is softer and poppier."

=== Music ===
The music on Celebration Rock has been described as "one part classic rock, one part punk", due to the blending of classic rock influences such as Bruce Springsteen and Tom Petty, with punk rock influences such as The Replacements and Hüsker Dü. Critic Steven Hyden described Celebration Rock as "taking a mighty lunge at the pantheon of great rock records," commenting that the album "addresses the teenage wasteland with the bombastic mix of fury and empathy that derives from Who's Next; traffics in the same streetwise rock-patter drivel originating from Born to Run; has the drunkard's sentimentality of Let It Be, and the tour-weary determinism of Appetite for Destruction. It's a beefy, pop-conscious punk record in the mold of Nevermind, and it's destined to become, like White Blood Cells, an important battle in the never-ending war to end bass playing as we know it." Tyler Kane of Paste Magazine assessed: "Like on their debut Post-Nothing, Japandroids remain relentless from the get-go, infusing their pulsating anthems with epic sing-alongs as they shout out choruses that 'yell like hell to the heavens.'" King explained: "We actually tried to simulate the sound of what we thought the crowd would do during the songs. Dave and I were in the studio just screaming out as if we were in the audience at our own show."

The band has repeatedly cited Live at Raji's by The Dream Syndicate as a major influence, stating that it was the record they had listened to the most during the writing and recording of Celebration Rock. The song "The Nights of Wine and Roses" is an homage to The Dream Syndicate song "The Days of Wine and Roses".

=== Lyrics ===
Lyrically, Celebration Rock has been described as a callback to classic rock conventions for its use of universal, mythic rock & roll language, including the use of contrasting themes such as good and evil, heaven and hell, life and death, young and old, etc. More specifically, themes explored on the album include friendship, lust, revenge, art, and self-actualization. As Ian Cohen of Pitchfork noted, "Japandroids have gone from having almost none at all [lyrics] to packing their songs with an astonishing command of legend and literalism that all but dares you to feel something." Regarding his use of language and themes, King stated:

Personally, I really like the concepts of good and evil, heaven and hell -- the extreme boundaries of how people can feel and how fast things can change. I like that language. I'm not talking about just some night you felt a certain way, I'm talking about the night you felt that way -- that one time. People have always alluded to those extremes as a way of characterizing the most intense feelings since blues and the early days of rock. A blues singer won't say, "We broke up." He'll say, "Satan stole my baby from me." You just pick it up.

— Brian King, Interview, Pitchfork Media

King has cited the novel Under The Volcano by Malcolm Lowry as a primary influence, inspiring him to try using more descriptive and poetic language in his lyrics: "In retrospect, the only work I can see reflected in the lyrics of Celebration Rock is Under The Volcano by Malcolm Lowry, a book I read twice during 2010-2011."

== Release and promotion ==
Celebration Rock Tour
- World tour by Japandroids
- Location: North America; South America; Europe; Asia; Oceania
- Start date: March 8, 2012; São Paulo, Brazil
- End date: November 10, 2013; Buenos Aires, Argentina
- Legs: 13
- No. of shows: 228; North America (101); South America (8); Europe (89); Asia (15); Oceania (15)

Japandroids concert chronology
- Post-Nothing Tour (2009-2010); Celebration Rock Tour (2012-2013); Near to the Wild Heart of Life Tour (2016-2018)

"Younger Us", the second single by Japandroids, was released by Polyvinyl Record Co. on July 20, 2010. It has been later included on Celebration Rock.

On March 26, 2012, Japandroids announced that their second album Celebration Rock would be released by Polyvinyl on June 5, 2012, preceded by a limited edition 7" of the album's first single "The House That Heaven Built" on May 15, 2012. On May 27, 2012, Celebration Rock was streamed in its entirety on NPR Music. The album was released in the band's native Canada on May 29, 2012. On June 8, 2012, the band performed the songs "Fire's Highway" and "The House That Heaven Built" on Late Night with Jimmy Fallon. On February 25, 2013, the band performed the song "The Nights of Wine & Roses" on Conan. On February 27, 2013, it was announced that "The House That Heaven Built" had temporarily been named the entrance theme for the Vancouver Canucks professional ice hockey team. On June 20, 2013, the band performed the song "Adrenaline Nightshift" on Late Show with David Letterman.

=== Music video ===
A video for "The House That Heaven Built", Japandroids' first music video, was released in August to promote the single. The black-and-white video, directed by Jim Larson and produced by Pitchfork.tv, documented one week in the life of Japandroids on tour using footage from the east coast portion of their spring 2012 U.S. tour, including live footage from shows in Toronto, Montreal, Boston, New York City, Brooklyn, and Washington, D.C.

=== Tour ===
Japandroids toured heavily in support of Celebration Rock, performing over 200 shows in more than 40 countries between March 2012 and November 2013. The Celebration Rock Tour consisted of 13 individual legs across North and South America, Europe, Asia, and Oceania, including numerous festival appearances: Coachella, Bonnaroo, Sasquatch!, Pitchfork, Firefly, Governors Ball, Fun Fun Fun Fest, Free Press Summer Fest, and Metallica's festival Orion in the United States, Primavera Sound, Optimus Alive!, Paredes de Coura, Pitchfork (Paris), OFF, Latitude and Longitude festivals in Europe, Vive Latino in Mexico, Fuji Rock Festival in Japan, and Laneway Festival in Australia.

== Reception and legacy ==
Professional ratings
Aggregate scores
Source	Rating
AnyDecentMusic?	8.0/10
Metacritic	83/100
Review scores
Source	Rating
AllMusic	3.5/5 stars
The A.V. Club	A
Chicago Tribune	3.5/4 stars
The Irish Times	4/5 stars
MSN Music (Expert Witness)	A−
NME	6/10
Pitchfork	8.8/10
Rolling Stone	4/5 stars
Slant Magazine	4.5/5 stars
Spin	9/10

Celebration Rock was released to critical acclaim. On Metacritic, the album has a score of 83 out of 100, based on 33 collected reviews. The A.V. Club's Kyle Ryan wrote, "Maybe it's because the songs were so hard won after that long dry spell that they sound especially lively, but Celebration Rock starts strong and stays there over the course of its eight songs and 35 minutes." Ian Cohen of Pitchfork gave the album a "Best New Music" designation, writing that even though Celebration Rock was recorded the same exact way as Post-Nothing, Celebration Rock "[..] dwarf[s] its impressive predecessor." Cohen continued: "[I]n writing about something other than the experience of being Japandroids, the duo taps into a power greater than itself to address impossibly vast and elemental topics-- friendship, lust, revenge, art, self-actualization-- with songs every bit as big." Megan Ritt of Consequence of Sound felt that the band had "retained the energy that pulses below the surface of the best tracks on Post-Nothing and infused it with more focus. Where Post-Nothing melts into a hazy dream, Celebration Rock does exactly what it claims to do—it burns on and on like the best sort of party." In 2019, Paste included the album in its list of the best indie rock releases of the 2010s. Staff member Tyler Kane wrote: "Japandroids’ eight-track, zero-percent-fat Celebration Rock is bookended by the triumphant sounds of fireworks, but the real explosions lie in the chemistry of duo Brian King and David Prowse, filling out the record with just guitar, drums and vocals. Celebration Rock exists as a testament that chant-along, simple rock songs still have a place in the greater discussion of music, and you’d be hard pressed to argue otherwise after hearing “The Nights of Wine and Roses” and “The House that Heaven Built.”

Not all reviews were positive, however. NME's Alex Denney gave Celebration Rock a mixed review, writing "Japandroids know how to bring the ruckus. But elsewhere the power-chord pummelage gets a bit one-note — and The Gun Club cover only reminds us that journeymen like these have no business dancing with the bones of Jeffrey Lee Pierce." Now's Carla Gillis criticized the album's repetitiveness, writing "[..] the band's refusal ever to let up on volume, bombast, group-shouted vocals, fast-strummed chords or smashing drums makes Celebration Rock an exhausting sonic assault in need of variety."

Pitchfork Media awarded the song "Younger Us" a 'Best New Music' designation, and ranked it #42 on its list of top 100 singles of 2010.

The album peaked at number 37 on the Billboard 200.

=== Accolades ===
Celebration Rock was nominated for the Juno Award for Alternative Album of the Year.

On June 14, 2012, the album was named as a long-listed nominee for the 2012 Polaris Music Prize. On July 17, Celebration Rock was named as a shortlisted nominee, making it one of ten possible candidates to win $30,000 and the recognition as the best Canadian album of the year as voted by jury of Canadian journalists and broadcasters. The album lost to Feist's 2011 album Metals.

Celebration Rock appeared on many critics year-end best-of lists:

- #1 – MTV's 20 Best Albums of 2012
- #1 – The Globe and Mail's Albums of the Year
- #1 – CBC Music's Top Rock Albums of 2012
- #1 – BuzzFeed's Top Rock Albums of 2012
- #2 – The A.V. Club's Top 25 Albums of 2012
- #2 – USA Today's Top Albums of 2012
- #2 – Insound's Top 50 Albums of 2012
- #3 – Spin's 50 Best Albums of 2012
- #4 – Village Voice's Top 25 Albums of 2012
- #4 – Exclaim!'s Top 30 Albums of 2012
- #5 – Los Angeles Times's Best Music of 2012
- #5 – Consequence of Sound's Top 50 Albums of 2012
- #5 – PopMatters's The 75 Best Albums of 2012
- #6 – Chicago Tribune's Top 10 Albums of 2012
- #7 – Stereogum's Top 50 Albums of 2012
- #7 – Paste Magazine's 50 Best Albums of 2012
- #9 – Rolling Stone's 50 Best Albums of 2012
- #11 – Pitchfork's Top 50 Albums of 2012
- NPR's 50 Favorite Albums of 2012

Metacritic lists the album as #5 on its 2012 Music Critic's List, which collects and tallies the individual year-end Top Ten lists published by major music critics and publications. In Canada, The Globe and Mail (Canada's newspaper of record) named Celebration Rock the best Canadian album of 2012, while CBC declared it the best rock album of the year, later ranking it #91 on its list of The 100 Greatest Canadian Albums Ever. The album was also well received internationally, with Rolling Stone listing it as one of The 10 Coolest Summer Albums of All Time, and Spin magazine calling it the third best album of 2012, later naming Japandroids 2012's Band of the Year.

== Track listing ==
Standard CD/LP version
No.	Title	Writer(s)	Length
1.	"The Nights of Wine and Roses"	Japandroids	4:02
2.	"Fire's Highway"	Japandroids	4:44
3.	"Evil's Sway"	Japandroids	4:27
4.	"For the Love of Ivy" (The Gun Club cover)	Jeffrey Lee Pierce, Kid Congo Powers	4:13
5.	"Adrenaline Nightshift"	Japandroids	4:26
6.	"Younger Us"	Japandroids	3:33
7.	"The House That Heaven Built"	Japandroids	4:49
8.	"Continuous Thunder"	Japandroids	4:59

Australian CD version
No.	Title	Writer(s)	Length
9.	"Heavenward Grand Prix"	Japandroids	3:55
10.	"Art Czars"	Japandroids	4:02
11.	"Sex and Dying in High Society" (X cover)	Exene Cervenka, John Doe	2:38
12.	"Shame" (PJ Harvey cover)	PJ Harvey	2:18
13.	"Racer-X" (Big Black cover)	Big Black	3:17
14.	"Jack The Ripper" (Nick Cave & The Bad Seeds cover)	Nick Cave	3:55
15.	"Younger Us" (7" Version)	Japandroids	3:35

Japanese CD version
No.	Title	Writer(s)	Length
9.	"Jack The Ripper" (Nick Cave & The Bad Seeds cover)	Nick Cave	3:55
10.	"Heavenward Grand Prix"	Japandroids	3:55
11.	"Shame" (PJ Harvey cover)	PJ Harvey	2:18
12.	"Art Czars"	Japandroids	4:02
13.	"Racer-X" (Big Black cover)	Big Black	3:17
14.	"Younger Us" (7" Version)	Japandroids	3:35
15.	"Sex and Dying in High Society" (X cover)	Exene Cervenka, John Doe	2:38

== Singles ==
- "The House That Heaven Built" (May 15, 2012)
  - 7" single b/w: "Jack The Ripper" (Nick Cave & The Bad Seeds cover)

== Personnel ==
Japandroids

- Brian King – guitar, lead vocals
- David Prowse – drums, backup vocals

Technical

- Jesse Gander – engineering, mixing, production
- Alan Douches – mastering

Photography

- Reiner Asscheman
- Brian Banks
- Annika Berglund
- Christian Bobak
- Simone Cecchetti
- Andy Collins
- Sam Cowling
- Geoff Hargadon
- Andy Mueller
- Tom Øverlie
- Leonardo Solis Varela
- Maryanne Ventrice
- Charlotte Zoller

== Charts ==
Chart performance
Chart (2012)	Peak position
Australian Hitseekers Albums (ARIA)	19
Canadian Albums (Nielsen SoundScan)	72
UK Independent Albums (Official Charts)	38
US Billboard 200	37
US Independent Albums (Billboard)	7
US Indie Store Album Sales (Billboard)	11
US Top Alternative Albums (Billboard)	9
US Top Rock Albums (Billboard)	17
