= Packs (band) =

Canadian indie rock band

- Origin: Toronto, Ontario, Canada
- Genres: Indie rock
- Years active: 2019–present
- Label: Fire Talk
- Members: Madeline Link; Shane Hooper; Dexter Nash; Noah O'Neil
- Website: packstheband.com

Packs (stylized as PACKS) is a Canadian indie rock band from Toronto.

== History ==
The band originated as the solo project of musician Madeline Link. The project later turned into a band, consisting of Link (guitar, vocals), Noah O'Neil (bass), Dexter Nash (guitar), and Shane Hooper (drums). After releasing singles throughout 2019, the band got the attention of Brooklyn-based label Fire Talk, who signed them in 2020. In March 2021, the band announced their debut album, Take the Cake, to be released jointly through Fire Talk and Royal Mountain Records. The album was released on May 14, 2021, and received mixed reviews.

On March 31, 2023, Packs released their second studio album via Fire Talk. The album features songs written between Toronto, Ottawa and Mexico City. The quartet holed up in a cabin in rural Quebec to record the album, and used the cabin's sauna as a makeshift recording booth. In September 2023, Packs announced they would release their third studio album, Melt the Honey, in January 2024 via Fire Talk.

== Band members ==
- Madeline Link – lead vocals, guitars (2019–present)
- Shane Hooper – drums, percussion (2021–present)
- Dexter Nash – lead guitar, keyboards (2021–present)
- Noah O'Neil – bass guitar (2021–present)

== Discography ==
=== Studio albums ===
- Take the Cake (2021, Fire Talk, Royal Mountain)
- Crispy Crunchy Nothing (2023, Fire Talk)
- Melt the Honey (2024, Fire Talk)

=== EPs ===
- Woah (stylized as WOAH) (2022, Fire Talk)
