= Jon McKiel =

Canadian singer-songwriter

Jon McKiel is a Canadian singer-songwriter, originally from Halifax, Nova Scotia and later based in Baie Verte, New Brunswick. He is most noted for his 2024 album Hex, which was a longlisted nominee for the 2024 Polaris Music Prize.

In addition to his solo recordings, McKiel collaborated with Julie Doiron, C.L. McLaughlin, Michael C. Duguay, James Anderson and Chris Meaney on the project Weird Lines, whose self-titled album was released on Sappy Futures in 2016.

== Discography ==
- The Nature of Things (2008)
- Confidence Lodge (2011)
- Tonka War Cloud (2011)
- Jon McKiel (2014)
- Memorial Ten Count (2017)
- Bobby Joe Hope (2020)
- Hex (2024)
