= No Singles =

Compilation album by Japandroids
- Released: 11 May 2010
- Recorded: 2006–2007; Victoria, BC, Canada
- Genre: Garage rock, noise rock
- Length: 40:05
- Label: Polyvinyl
- Producer: Japandroids

Japandroids chronology
Post-Nothing (2009)	No Singles (2010)	Celebration Rock (2012)

No Singles is a compilation album by Canadian rock duo Japandroids. It was released on 11 May 2010 on the Polyvinyl label.

Professional ratings
Review scores
Source	Rating
AllMusic	3/5 stars
The A.V. Club	B
Consequence	C+
Drowned in Sound	6/10
Pitchfork	6.7/10
Under the Radar	7/10 stars

== Release ==
No Singles is a compilation album consisting of Japandroids' first two EPs: Lullaby Death Jams (2008) and All Lies (2007). Released by Polyvinyl on 11 May 2010, the compilation represents all of the material Japandroids recorded prior to the release of their debut album, Post-Nothing (2009).

Both EPs were originally self-released by the band, and had previously been out of print. Both were remastered by John Golden for this release. A booklet included with No Singles details Japandroids' early history, with rare photos, show fliers, etc. The band has stated that the re-release of their earliest material in 2010 was strictly designed to appease their fans desire for more music, as they would not be able to record a second album until 2011 due to an extensive touring schedule.

The title of "Darkness on the Edge of Gastown" is a dual reference to Bruce Springsteen's 1978 album Darkness on the Edge of Town and the Gastown neighbourhood of Vancouver.

== Track listing ==
CD/LP edition
No.	Title	Writer(s)	Length
1.	"Darkness on the Edge of Gastown"	Japandroids, King	4:14
2.	"No Allegiance to the Queen"	Japandroids, King	4:36
3.	"Sexual Aerosol"	Japandroids, King	3:59
4.	"Lovers/Strangers"	Japandroids, King, Prowse	1:46
5.	"Lucifer's Symphony"	Japandroids, King	6:53
6.	"Couture Suicide"	Japandroids, King	4:41
7.	"Avant Sleepwalk"	Japandroids, King, Prowse	2:37
8.	"Coma Complacency"	Japandroids, King, Prowse	3:05
9.	"To Hell With Good Intentions" (Mclusky cover)	Falkous, Chapple, Harding	3:27
10.	"Press Corps"	Japandroids, King	5:15

== Personnel ==
Japandroids

- Brian King – guitar, lead vocals
- David Prowse – drums, backup vocals

Technical personnel

- Matt Skillings – Engineer
- Thomas Shields – Engineer

== Original EPs ==
Year	EP Details	Track listing
2008	Lullaby Death Jams: Label: Self-released; Recorded: 24–25 June 2007; Released: 1 January 2008; Formats: CD; Copies: 500	1. "Darkness on the Edge of Gastown" – 4:14; 2. "No Allegiance to the Queen" – 4:36; 3. "Sexual Aerosol" – 3:59; 4. "Lovers/Strangers" – 1:46; 5. "Lucifer's Symphony" – 6:53
2007	All Lies: Label: Self-released; Recorded: 26–27 November 2006; Released: 1 May 2007; Formats: CD; Copies: 500	1. "Couture Suicide" – 4:41; 2. "Avant Sleepwalk" – 2:37; 3. "Coma Complacency" – 3:05; 4. "To Hell With Good Intentions" (Mclusky) – 3:27; 5. "Press Corps" – 5:15
