= NOS Alive =

Music festival in Portugal

Coordinates: 38.6958°N 9.2295°W

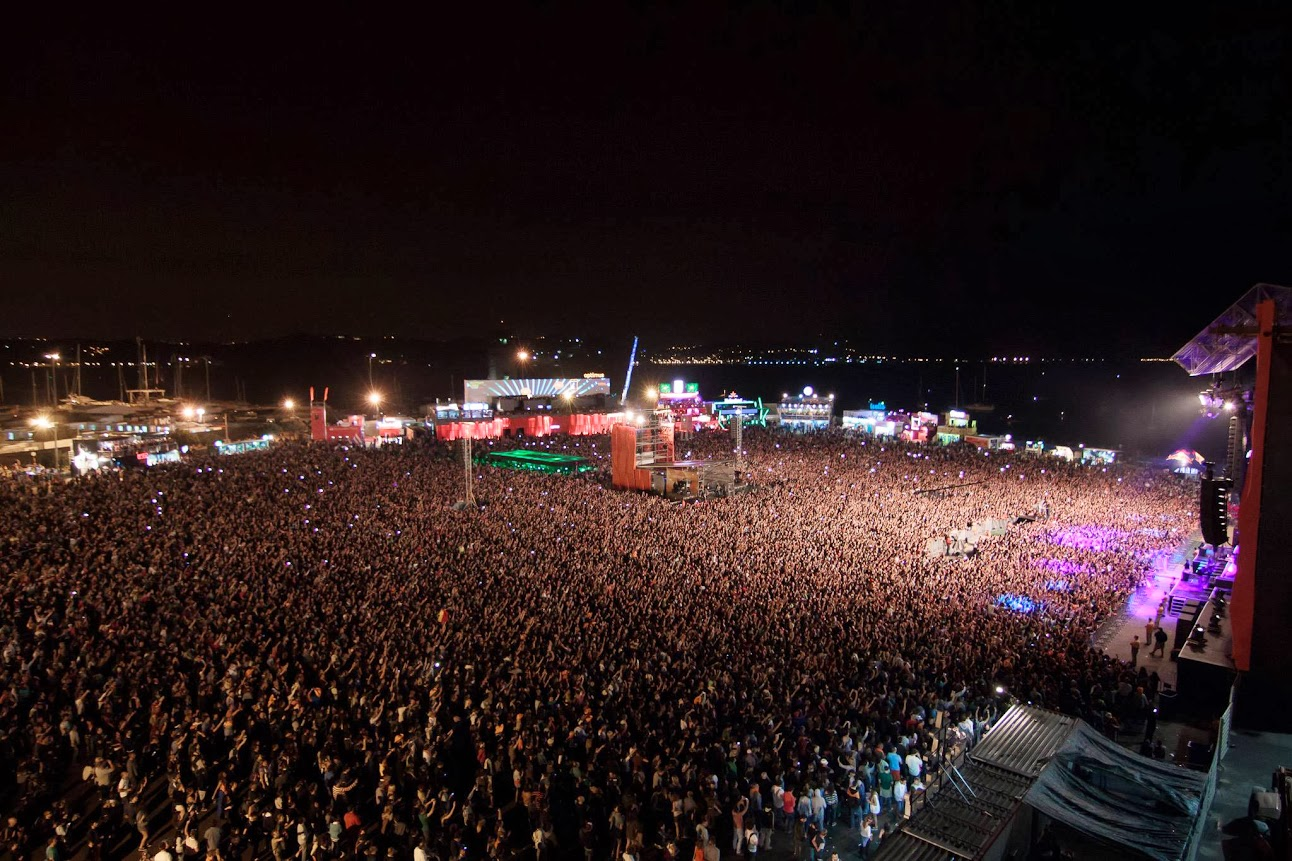
- Optimus Alive in 2013
- Genre: Rock, alternative rock, pop, electronica, fado, stand-up comedy
- Dates: July (since 2008)
- Locations: Passeio Marítimo de Algés, Algés, Oeiras, Portugal
- Years active: 2007–present
- Organizer: Everything is New
- Website: www.nosalive.com

NOS Alive (formerly Optimus Alive) is an annual music and arts festival held in the Algés riverside, close to Lisbon, in Portugal. It is organized since 2007 by the Portuguese live entertainment company Everything is New. Its naming sponsor is telecommunications company NOS (previously named Optimus).

It takes place during the second week of July and lasts 3 or 4 days. It currently has six stages, including a stage dedicated to fado music and a stage dedicated to stand-up comedy.

== History ==
The Alive festival was created by the live entertainment company Everything is New in 2007. The name of the festival is taken from the Pearl Jam song "Alive". The first edition occurred between 8 and 10 June 2007, under the name Oeiras Alive!, and had two stages. The headliners were Pearl Jam, The Smashing Pumpkins and the Beastie Boys.

In its second edition, the date of the festival was changed to the second weekend of July and the name of the festival was changed to include a naming sponsor. Between 2008 and 2010, the festival was named Optimus Alive!, after the telecommunications company Optimus. A third stage was added in the 2009 edition. The 2009 edition was also the only edition to date to have a day dedicated to heavy metal music in the main stage, which had Metallica as the headliner.

In 2011, the exclamation mark was dropped from the festival name, and it became "Optimus Alive" until 2014. To mark its 5th anniversary, an extra day was added to the festival, making it a 4-day event in 2011. A new bandstand stage was added in 2012.

In 2014 the naming sponsor company Optimus changed its name to NOS, and the festival name was changed accordingly to NOS Alive in 2015.

A stage dedicated to stand-up comedy was also added in the 2014 edition. In 2016, a new stage dedicated to fado music was added.

The 2020 edition of NOS Alive was planned to happen between 8 and 11 July 2020, with Kendrick Lamar, Taylor Swift, Billie Eilish and The Strokes as headliners. On 19 May 2020, the festival was cancelled due to the Portuguese government's decision to prohibit all large-scale events in the country until 30 September 2020, amid the COVID-19 pandemic. Following this cancellation, NOS Alive '21 was scheduled to take place between 7 and 10 July 2021, with all tickets bought for 2020 valid for the new dates or refunded by request. In early May 2021, Álvaro Covões, CEO of Everything is New, expressed his doubts regarding the execution of the festival that year due to the continuing COVID-19 pandemic. The festival was cancelled once again on 20 May 2021, and the tickets remained valid for NOS Alive '22.

The festival returned in 2022 with a 4-day format. This edition had a record total attendance of 210,000 people.

== Location ==
The festival takes place at the Passeio Marítimo de Algés, a riverside open-area close to the limits of the city of Lisbon. The nearest public transport stop is the Algés train station, which is part of the Cascais Line.

== Editions ==
Edition	Year	Dates	Attendance	Headliners	Notable acts
1	2007	8–10 June	70,000	Pearl Jam, The Smashing Pumpkins, Beastie Boys	Blasted Mechanism, Da Weasel, Linkin Park, Matisyahu, The Used, The White Stripes
2	2008	10–12 July	100,000	Rage Against The Machine, Bob Dylan, Neil Young	Ben Harper & The Innocent Criminals, Buraka Som Sistema, CSS, Donavon Frankenreiter, Gogol Bordello, Gossip, The Hives, John Butler Trio, MGMT, The National, Spiritualized, Vampire Weekend, Within Temptation
3	2009	9–11 July	110,000	Metallica, The Prodigy, Dave Matthews Band	The Black Eyes Peas, Chris Cornell, Crystal Castles, Deadmau5, Eagles of Death Metal, Erol Alkan, Fischerspooner, Klaxons, The Kooks, Lamb of God, Lykke Li, Machine Head, Mastodon, Placebo, RAMP, Slipknot, TV on the Radio
4	2010	8–10 July	115,000	Faith No More, Deftones, Pearl Jam	Alice in Chains, Biffy Clyro, Calvin Harris, Dropkick Murphys, Gogol Bordello, Gomez, Florence + The Machine, Jet, Kasabian, La Roux, LCD Soundsystem, Manic Street Preachers, Mão Morta, Moonspell, Simian Mobile Disco, Skunk Anansie, Steve Aoki, The xx
5	2011	6–9 July	160,000	Coldplay, Thirty Seconds to Mars, Foo Fighters, Jane's Addiction	Anna Calvi, Atari Teenage Riot, Blondie, The Bloody Beetroots Death Crew 77, The Chemical Brothers, Digitalism, Dizzee Rascal, Fleet Foxes, Foals, Grinderman, Iggy and the Stooges, James Blake, Jimmy Eat World, Kaiser Chiefs, My Chemical Romance, Paramore, Patrick Wolf, Steve Aoki, Thievery Corporation, TV on the Radio
6	2012	13–15 July	165,000	The Stone Roses, The Cure, Radiohead	The Antlers, Awolnation, Buraka Som Sistema, Caribou, Danko Jones, Death in Vegas, LMFAO, Justice, The Kills, The Kooks, The Maccabees, Mazzy Star, Metronomy, Miles Kane, Mumford & Sons, Refused, Santigold, SBTRKT, Snow Patrol, Tricky, Warpaint
7	2013	12–14 July		Green Day, Depeche Mode, Kings of Leon	Alt-J, Band of Horses, Biffy Clyro, Crystal Castles, Crystal Fighters, Death From Above 1979, Disclosure, Django Django, Editors, Edward Sharpe and the Magnetic Zeros, Japandroids, Jessie Ware, Jurassic 5, Icona Pop, Phoenix, Rhye, Steve Aoki, Tame Impala, Two Door Cinema Club, Vampire Weekend
8	2014	10–12 July	165,000	Arctic Monkeys, The Black Keys, The Libertines	The 1975, A-Trak, Au Revoir Simone, Bastille, Ben Howard, Booka Shade, Boys Noize, Buraka Som Sistema, Caribou, Chet Faker, Chromeo, Daughter, Diplo, Elbow, Foster The People, Imagine Dragons, Interpol, Jamie xx, Nicolas Jaar, Nina Kraviz, Kelis, The Lumineers, MGMT, Sam Smith, SBTRKT, Unknown Mortal Orchestra, The War on Drugs
9	2015	9–11 July	155,000	Muse, The Prodigy, Disclosure	Alt-J, Azealia Banks, Ben Harper & The Innocent Criminals, Chet Faker, Chromeo, Counting Crows, Django Django, Flume, Future Islands, James Bay, James Blake, Jessie Ware, The Jesus and Mary Chain, Kodaline, Metronomy, Mogwai, Mumford & Sons, Róisín Murphy, Sam Smith, Sheppard, The Ting Tings, Young Fathers
10	2016	7–9 July	100,000	The Chemical Brothers, Radiohead, Arcade Fire	The 1975, Band of Horses, Biffy Clyro, Calexico, Courtney Barnett, Father John Misty, Foals, Four Tet, Grimes, Hot Chip, John Grant, José González, M83, Pixies, Robert Plant & The Sensational Space Shifters, Ratatat, Soulwax, Tame Impala, Two Door Cinema Club, Wolf Alice, Years & Years
11	2017	6–8 July	165,000	The Weeknd, Foo Fighters, Depeche Mode	Alt-J, The Avalanches, Blossoms, Bonobo, Courteeners, Cage The Elephant, The Cult, Fleet Foxes, Floating Points, Glass Animals, Imagine Dragons, The Kills, Kodaline, Local Natives, Parov Stelar, Peaches, Phoenix, Rhye, Royal Blood, Ryan Adams, Savages, Spoon, Warpaint, Wild Beasts, The xx
12	2018	12–14 July	165,000	Arctic Monkeys, Queens of the Stone Age, Pearl Jam	Alice in Chains, At The Drive-In, Bryan Ferry, Black Rebel Motorcycle Club, Chvrches, Eels, Franz Ferdinand, Friendly Fires, Future Islands, Jack White, Jain, Japandroids, Juana Molina, Kaleo, Khalid, The Kooks, The Last Internationale, MGMT, The National, Nine Inch Nails, Perfume Genius, Portugal. The Man, Rag'n'Bone Man, Real Estate, Sampha, Snow Patrol, Sophie, Two Door Cinema Club, Wolf Alice, Yo La Tengo
13	2019	11–13 July		The Cure, Vampire Weekend, The Smashing Pumpkins	Bon Iver, The Chemical Brothers, Cut Copy, The Gift, Grace Jones, Greta van Fleet, Gossip, Hot Chip, Idles, Jorja Smith, Marina, Mogwai, Ornatos Violeta, Perry Farrell's Kind Heaven Orchestra, Primal Scream, Robyn, Ry X, Sharon van Etten, Tash Sultana, Thom Yorke, Tom Walker, Xavier Rudd, Weezer
14	2022	6–9 July	210,000	The Strokes, Florence + The Machine, Metallica, Imagine Dragons	AJ Tracey, Alt-J, Balthazar, Caribou, Celeste, Da Weasel, Don Broco, Fontaines D.C., Glass Animals, Haim, Jorja Smith, Jungle, Mallu Magalhães, Modest Mouse, Mother Mother, M.I.A., Parcels, Parov Stelar, Phoebe Bridgers, Royal Blood, St. Vincent, Stromae, Nicki Nicole, Two Door Cinema Club, The War on Drugs
15	2023	6–8 July	164,600	Red Hot Chili Peppers, Arctic Monkeys, Sam Smith	Angel Olsen, The Black Keys, Boys Noize, City and Colour, The Driver Era, Girl in Red, Idles, Jacob Collier, King Princess, Lil Nas X, Lizzo, Machine Gun Kelly, Men I Trust, Morad, Omah Lay, Puscifer, Queens of the Stone Age, Rina Sawayama, Rüfüs Du Sol, Tash Sultana
16	2024	11–13 July	165,000	Arcade Fire, Dua Lipa, Pearl Jam	Alec Benjamin, Arlo Parks, Ashnikko, Aurora, Benjamin Clementine, Black Pumas, Blasted Mechanism, The Breeders, The Cat Empire, Floating Points, Gloria Groove, Khruangbin, Jessie Ware, Michael Kiwanuka, Nothing But Thieves, Parcels, The Smashing Pumpkins, Sum 41
17	2025	10-12 July		Olivia Rodrigo, Anyma, Muse	Amyl and the Sniffers, Barry Can't Swim, Benson Boone, Finneas, Foster The People, Future Islands, Girl In Red, Glass Animals, Justice, Mark Ambor, Nathy Peluso, Nine Inch Nails, Noah Kahan, Parov Stelar, Sammy Virji, St. Vincent, The Wombats

== Media coverage ==
NOS Alive has a media partnership with the Portuguese public broadcaster RTP and the radio station Rádio Comercial. RTP provides coverage of the festival, including transmission of selected concerts, in their streaming platform RTP Play.

== See also ==
- List of rock festivals
