= Japandroids =

Canadian rock band

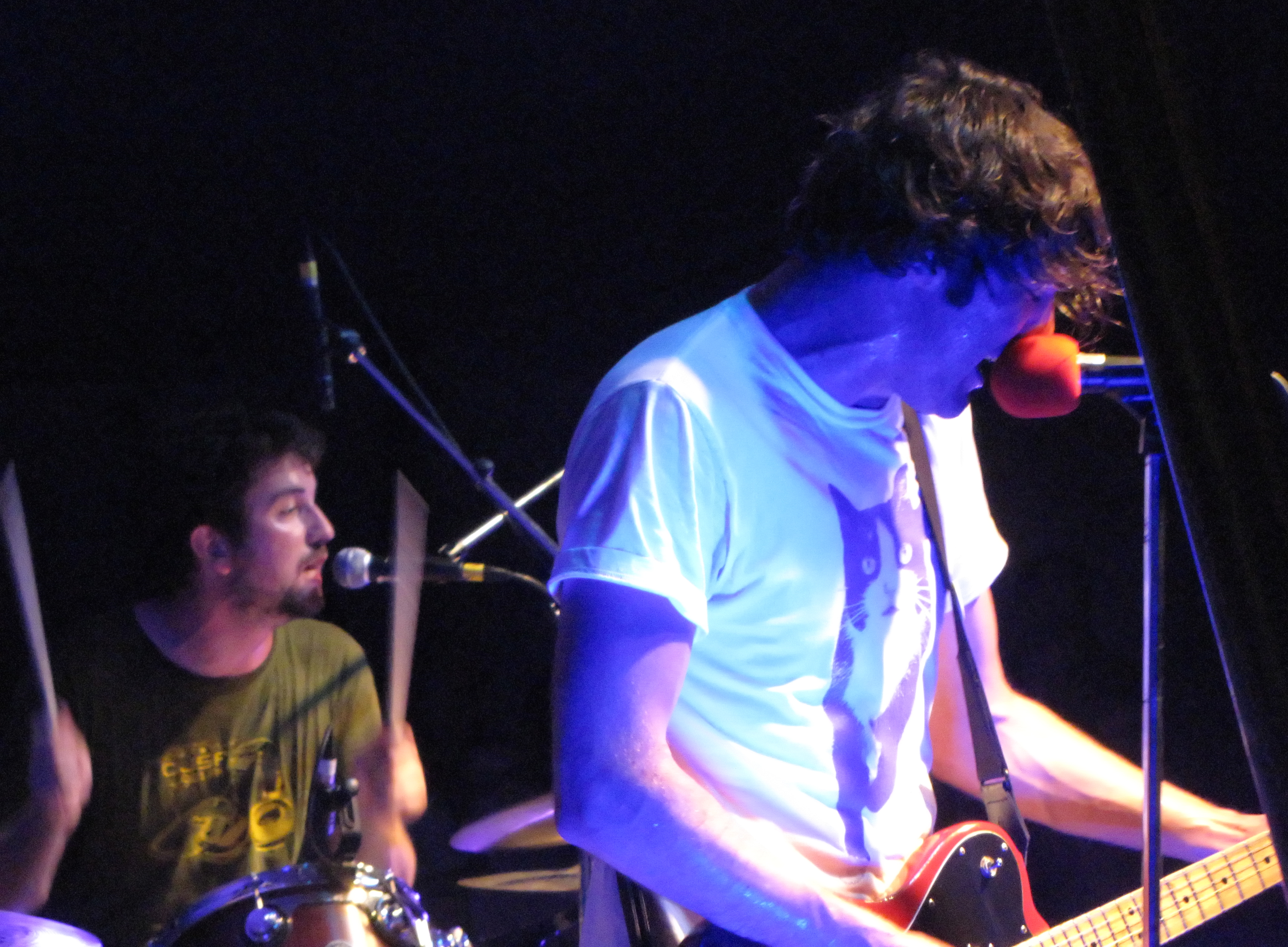
- Japandroids in concert at the Hillside Festival in 2010

Background information
- Origin: Vancouver, British Columbia, Canada
- Genres: Alternative rock; indie rock; noise rock; punk rock; garage rock
- Years active: 2006–2024 (hiatuses: 2013–2016, 2018–2024)
- Labels: Polyvinyl; ANTI-; Arts & Crafts
- Past members: Brian King; David Prowse
- Website: www.japandroids.com

Japandroids were a Canadian rock duo from Vancouver, British Columbia, formed in 2006. The band consisted of Brian King on lead vocals and guitar, and David Prowse on drums and backing (with occasional lead) vocals.

The band rose to prominence following the release of their debut album Post-Nothing (2009). Their second album, Celebration Rock (2012), was released to widespread critical acclaim, with Rolling Stone calling it one of The 10 Coolest Summer Albums of All Time, and Spin naming the duo Band of the Year. Japandroids toured heavily in support of both albums, gaining notoriety for their live performances and extensive international concert tours. Between 2009 and 2013, the band performed approximately 500 shows in 44 countries. The band's third studio album, Near to the Wild Heart of Life (2017), featured a more polished aesthetic and was released to more extensive touring. The band released its fourth and final album, Fate & Alcohol, in October 2024 after several years of inactivity.

Japandroids' music has been described as "one part classic rock, one part punk", due to their blending of classic rock influences such as Bruce Springsteen and Tom Petty, with punk rock influences such as the Replacements and Hüsker Dü.

== History ==
=== Early years (2006–2008) ===
Japandroids was formed in 2006 by Brian King (guitar, vocals) and David Prowse (drums, vocals). The two met in 2000 while attending the University of Victoria in Victoria, British Columbia, and upon discovering a mutual interest in music, began attending live shows together regularly in Victoria and Vancouver. In 2003, Prowse moved to Vancouver, transferring to Simon Fraser University. Eager to form their own band, King agreed to relocate to Vancouver following his graduation, doing so in 2005. Heavily influenced by the raw and energetic recordings of The Sonics, King and Prowse began writing and recording music in 2006, hoping to emulate the same style. While they originally intended to find a third member to act as lead vocalist, they later decided to forego having a specific lead singer and simply share vocal duties. The name Japandroids is a portmanteau formed from two other band name ideas: Japanese Scream (from Prowse) and Pleasure Droids (from King). Occasionally they would spell it without vowels, as JPNDRDS.

Frustrated by the lack of support for live music in Vancouver, as well as the difficulty of 'breaking into' the local music scene, King and Prowse regularly set up their own shows. Inspired by the do-it-yourself methods of bands like Fugazi, they would often arrange for a venue or space to play, rent equipment, design and distribute flyers and posters, as well as arrange for their friends to help run the shows. Japandroids performed their first live show on December 30, 2006. Over the next two years, they would perform regularly in Vancouver, but managed only short, sporadic tours due to conflicts with King's geology studies. During this period, Japandroids self-released two EPs, 2007's All Lies, and 2008's Lullaby Death Jams. Each EP was limited to 500 copies, and would later be re-released as a compilation titled No Singles.

Japandroids recorded their first full-length album, Post-Nothing in the summer of 2008, with the intention of self-releasing it in 2009. However, by the fall of 2008, King and Prowse had become convinced that the band was going nowhere, and mutually decided to call it quits at the end of the year. It was agreed that their appearances at Pop Montreal in Montreal and CMJ Music Marathon in New York City would be their final live performances. It was also agreed that they would self-release the album early in 2009, but would not promote it. By December 2008, King was already attempting to assemble a new band.

=== Post-Nothing (2009–2010) ===
In January 2009, Japandroids signed to independent Canadian label Unfamiliar Records, who were eager to release the album, despite the band's reservations about continuing. Frustrated by label interest only after they had decided to break-up, King and Prowse reluctantly agreed to continue Japandroids temporarily, and began performing live again. In March 2009, taste-making website Pitchfork awarded the song "Young Hearts Spark Fire" a 'Best New Track' designation, instantly exposing the band to a large audience outside of Canada. Their debut album, Post-Nothing was released in Canada in April 2009, originally on vinyl only. Pitchfork championed the album, awarding it a 'Best New Music' designation, and praising its rawness, energy and reckless abandon. Japandroids were subsequently signed to Polyvinyl Record Co. in June 2009.

Post-Nothing Tour
- World tour by Japandroids
- Location: North America; Europe
- Start date: June 13, 2009; Vancouver, Canada
- End date: October 27, 2010; Hoboken, NJ, USA
- Legs: 9
- No. of shows: 229; North America (164); Europe (65)

Post-Nothing was released worldwide in August 2009 to widespread critical acclaim, especially in Canada where Exclaim! named it the second best album of 2009. It was long-listed for the Polaris Music Prize as well as nominated for the Juno Award for Alternative Album of the Year. The album was also well-received internationally, appearing on many year-end lists including Pitchfork (#15), Spin (#16), NME (#39), The A.V. Club (#25), Pop Matters (#35), Stereogum (#21), and reached No. 22 on the Billboard Heatseekers chart.

Japandroids toured extensively to promote the album, earning praise for their energetic live performances. The Post-Nothing Tour consisted of 9 individual legs, and included over 200 shows in more than 20 countries. While primarily headlining their own shows, Japandroids also toured supporting acts such as A Place To Bury Strangers and Health in Europe, and The Walkmen in North America.

The Post-Nothing Tour was originally scheduled to begin on April 23, 2009, in Calgary, Alberta. After performing one show, Japandroids were forced to postpone and reschedule the remainder of their first full-scale North American tour due to a health emergency. On the morning of April 24, 2009, King was checked into Calgary's Foothills Medical Center to undergo emergency surgery for a life-threatening perforated ulcer. Touring resumed June 13, 2009 after King's recovery with a performance at Vancouver's Music Waste festival, and continued uninterrupted through to the final show October 27, 2010 at Maxwell's in Hoboken, New Jersey. Among the dates of the tour were numerous festival appearances in North America and Europe, including Pitchfork Music Festival, Sasquatch!, Bonnaroo, Osheaga Festival, Roskilde Festival, and Primavera Sound.

Initially, the duo desired to include several more tracks on the album, but were unable due to insufficient funds. Many of the un-included tracks that the duo had written for the album were later recorded and released in 2010 as series of limited edition 7" singles. These tracks include "Art Czars", "Younger Us", and "Heavenward Grand Prix". The same year, Japandroids re-released their first two EPs as a compilation titled No Singles. The band has stated that both the 7" singles series, as well as the No Singles compilation, were designed to appease fans desire for more music, as they would not be able to record a second album until 2011 due to an extensive touring schedule.

=== Celebration Rock (2011–2013) ===
After taking the bulk of 2011 off to work on new material, Japandroids revealed that they would tour North America throughout August and September playing primarily smaller, intimate venues in order to test out their new material prior to the recording of their second album. During these shows, the band debuted several new songs including "Fire's Highway", "Adrenaline Nightshift", and "Evil's Sway". Following the tour, the band temporarily relocated from Vancouver to Nashville to continue writing. The duo cited disillusion with Vancouver, as well as the difficulty of returning to a sedentary lifestyle following two years of continuous touring, as the primary motivations for the move.

Celebration Rock Tour
- World tour by Japandroids
- Location: North America; South America; Europe; Asia; Oceania
- Start date: March 8, 2012; São Paulo, Brazil
- End date: November 10, 2013; Buenos Aires, Argentina
- Legs: 13
- No. of shows: 228; North America (101); South America (8); Europe (89); Asia (15); Oceania (15)

On March 26, 2012, Japandroids announced that their second album Celebration Rock would be released by Polyvinyl on June 5, 2012, preceded by a limited edition 7" of the album's first single "The House That Heaven Built" on May 15, 2012. A video for "The House That Heaven Built", Japandroids' first music video, was released that summer to promote the single. The black-and-white video, directed by Jim Larson and produced by Pitchfork.tv, documented one week in the life of Japandroids on tour using footage from the east coast portion of their spring 2012 US tour, including live footage from shows in Toronto, Montreal, Boston, New York City, Brooklyn, and Washington, D.C.

Celebration Rock garnered widespread acclaim from critics, who praised the album's blending of classic rock and punk rock influences, as well as King's newfound lyrical ambition. As Ian Cohen of Pitchfork noted, "Japandroids have gone from having almost none at all [lyrics] to packing their songs with an astonishing command of legend and literalism that all but dares you to feel something." The album was especially well received in their native Canada, with The Globe and Mail naming it the best Canadian album of 2012, while CBC declared it the best rock album of the year. The same year, Celebration Rock was short-listed for the Polaris Music Prize as well as nominated for the Juno Award for Alternative Album of the Year.

The album was also well received internationally earning a Best New Music designation from Pitchfork, a 9 out of 10 from Spin, and a 4 out of 5 from Rolling Stone. The album also appeared on many year-end lists including MTV (#1), The A.V. Club (#2), USA Today (#2), Spin (#3), Village Voice (#4), Pitchfork (#5), Rolling Stone (#8), and reached No. 37 on the Billboard 200 chart.

Japandroids toured heavily in support of Celebration Rock, performing over 200 shows in more than 40 countries between March 2012 and November 2013. The Celebration Rock Tour consisted of 13 individual legs across North and South America, Europe, Asia, and Oceania, including numerous festival appearances: Coachella, Bonnaroo, Sasquatch!, Pitchfork, Firefly, Governors Ball, Fun Fun Fun Fest, Free Press Summer Fest, and Metallica's festival Orion in the United States, Primavera Sound, Optimus Alive!, Paredes de Coura, Pitchfork (Paris), OFF, Latitude and Longitude festivals in Europe, Vive Latino in Mexico, Fuji Rock Festival in Japan, and Laneway Festival in Australia.

On November 17, 2013, the band posted a thank you and farewell message to fans online. Following this message, Japandroids' online presence was inactive for nearly three years. The band did not perform or give any public appearances in this time, leading fans to speculate on the band's status.

///// SLEEP ///// FOREVER ///// hey gang // brian here // after 200-and-something shows in 40-something countries, the Celebration Rock Tour is officially over! // thanks to everyone who came out to the shows and drank, smoked, sweat, bled, puked, fucked, fought, danced, dove, yelled, screamed, sang, and most importantly rocked with us these last two years // we will forever be in all of your debt for allowing us to do what we do // time for us to disappear into the ether for a while…y'all stay crazy/forever // x

=== Near to the Wild Heart of Life (2014–2020) ===
Following the end of the Celebration Rock Tour, the duo decided to take an extended break from the band. In an interview with The Independent, King cited exhaustion as the primary motivation: "When we got home, we were just totally destroyed, really burnt out both physically and mentally; at that point, we hadn't taken a serious break from the band in five years. So we took about six months off – the first half of 2014 – and decided to dedicate that time to ourselves and our personal lives." During this period, King began splitting his time between Toronto and Mexico City, while Prowse remained in their hometown of Vancouver. In late 2014, the band reconvened in New Orleans to begin writing new material: "We rented a house and spent about five weeks there, with all the gear in the living room, just playing every day. We hadn't written anything in a long time, so it took a minute just to get the ball rolling again." The duo would spend the next year writing together via similar sessions, alternating between cities.

The album was recorded in the fall of 2015 with longtime engineer Jesse Gander, but wasn't mixed until the following spring. The band attributed wanting to work with Peter Katis as one of the primary reasons for the album's delayed release: "We really wanted Peter Katis, who's well known for working with bands like The National and Interpol, to mix our record, but we had to wait around a little while in order to work with him."

Near To The Wild Heart Of Life Tour
- World tour by Japandroids
- Location: North America; Europe; Oceania
- Start date: October 5, 2016; Vancouver, Canada
- End date: October 17, 2018; Toronto, Canada
- Legs: 12
- No. of shows: 152; North America (92); Europe (45); Oceania (15)

On August 10, 2016, Japandroids announced their first shows in nearly three years: a 4-night stand (October 5–8) at The Cobalt in Vancouver, followed by shows in Toronto, Los Angeles, New York, London, and Mexico City. On August 18, 2016, additional shows were announced in Sydney and Melbourne. Both tour posters featured images seemingly taken from within a studio, suggesting that new material was forthcoming.

On October 31, 2016, Japandroids announced their third album Near to the Wild Heart of Life via a teaser video featuring live footage from their comeback shows in Vancouver. On November 2, 2016, it was confirmed that the album would be released by Anti- on January 27, 2017, and preceded by a limited edition 7" of the album's title track. When asked about the motivation behind switching labels, King stated: "It just felt like a very natural thing to do, and at a very natural time. Celebration Rock and the Celebration Rock Tour felt like a triumphant ending to the first era of the band, an era that I will forever associate with Polyvinyl. But starting in 2014, I think both Dave and I felt that we were no longer 'continuing' something but starting something new, and wanted a new label to represent whatever that was." According to Prowse, Anti- came to their attention following a chance encounter with one of their staff members at a bar in New Orleans.

On January 10, 2017, "No Known Drink or Drug" was released digitally to promote the album ahead of its release. On January 19, 2017, Near to the Wild Heart of Life was streamed in its entirety on NPR Music in the United States and on CBC Music in Canada. On January 31, 2017, the band performed "Near to the Wild Heart of Life" on The Late Show with Stephen Colbert and on May 9, 2017, performed "Near to the Wild Heart of Life", "True Love and a Free Life of Free Will", and "Midnight To Morning" on Later... with Jools Holland. On May 16, 2017, a limited edition 7" of the album's second single "North East South West" was released. On October 11, 2017, the band performed "No Known Drink Or Drug" on Late Night with Seth Meyers. On October 24, 2017, Japandroids’ show at Massey Hall in Toronto was filmed and recorded for the concert film series Live At Massey Hall. The film was released on June 14, 2018.

Japandroids toured heavily in support of Near to the Wild Heart of Life, performing over 150 shows in 23 countries between October 2016 and October 2018. The Near to the Wild Heart of Life Tour consisted of 12 individual legs across North America, Europe, and Oceania, including numerous festival appearances: South by Southwest, Shaky Knees Music Festival, Sasquatch!, Governors Ball, Pitchfork Music Festival, and Foo Fighters' Cal Jam in the United States, Reading and Leeds Festivals, Latitude, End of the Road, Electric Picnic, Primavera Sound, Paredes de Coura, NOS Alive in Europe, Corona Capital in Mexico, and Meredith Music Festival in Australia.

The final date of the Near to the Wild Heart of Life Tour took place on October 17, 2018, at the Phoenix Concert Theatre in Toronto. A celebration of Legalization Day in Canada, Japandroids' set included five new songs, written on the setlist as "International", "D+T", "Baby's", "Infinity", and "Alice". The show would end up being the band's final performance, with Brian King reflecting in 2024: "I'm very proud of that one. We'd been touring for two years and I was in rough shape, drinking heavily to get through each day. But it was the very last show and I gave it everything I had. Obviously I didn’t know it would be our final show ever, but the fact that we finished the tour on a high note definitely made it easier to walk away. Had it been a bad show, or even mediocre one, there almost certainly would have been more. So many bands end in a fight or an overdose, but we went out guns blazing in Toronto."

On May 27, 2020, Japandroids announced their first live album Massey Fucking Hall. The album was recorded on October 24, 2017, at Massey Hall in Toronto, and would be released by Anti- on June 26, 2020 (digital) and October 2, 2020 (vinyl). The announcement came during the height of the COVID-19 pandemic, when virtually all live concerts and music festivals across North America were either canceled or postponed. On the timing of the release, Prowse stated:

I really, really miss live shows. I miss playing them and I miss being in the crowd. When you love music, there are few things more uplifting and cathartic than being in a room full of people at a show. To not have that opportunity to experience live music together with a group of people has been a hard adjustment. It's disorienting and makes me sad to think about. I hope that in some small way people who are feeling similarly can find some solace in this record. They can hear the crowd and listen to us having the time of our lives at a historic venue and maybe that makes life a little easier for a minute, and reminds them that those moments will happen again down the road.

=== Fate & Alcohol and break-up (2021–2024) ===
In November 2021, it was announced that Japandroids would be performing Celebration Rock in full at Shaky Knees Festival 2022 in Atlanta, Georgia to celebrate its ten-year anniversary. The performance was ultimately cancelled, with no further shows announced. Regarding the cancelation, Prowse noted: "At first, [Brian] was like, 'I don't know about this tour, we're still in the middle of making this record.' And then that conversation kind of quickly evolved into, 'I don't know if I ever want to tour again.'"

On July 17, 2024, Japandroids announced their fourth and final record, Fate & Alcohol, which was released on Oct 18, 2024 on Anti-, with King opting to end the band to focus on his sobriety and family life. The album was preceded by the singles, "Chicago", "D&T", and "All Bets Are Off". On the day of the album's release, Prowse posted a thank you letter to the band's fans, confirming the end of the band: "Brian and I have decided to bring the band to a close with the release of our final album, Fate & Alcohol, which is officially out today. There won't be any farewell shows or a final tour. We are very proud of this album and we knew we needed to finish it before we could say goodbye to the band and go our separate ways. We hope you like it."

Regarding the band's dissolution and decision not to tour behind the album, King noted that the split was amicable: "It's not like we got into a huge fight, screamed 'fuck you' at one another, stormed off, and now we're broken up." Prowse elaborated: "There was a brief moment where I think Brian had some second thoughts, and whether it was unfair to the album that we’re not going to tour and properly promote it. We've had every conversation you could have, looked at every possibility, run every scenario. [...] I'd rather be playing drums and going all over the world playing shows, to be completely honest."

== Discography ==
Studio albums

- Post-Nothing (2009)
- Celebration Rock (2012)
- Near to the Wild Heart of Life (2017)
- Fate & Alcohol (2024)

Live albums

- Massey Fucking Hall (2020)

Compilation albums

- No Singles (2010)
