= Fate & Alcohol =

Studio album by Japandroids
- Released: October 18, 2024
- Studio: Rain City (Vancouver)
- Length: 36:21
- Label: Anti-
- Producers: Japandroids; Jesse Gander

Japandroids chronology
Massey Fucking Hall (2020)	Fate & Alcohol (2024)

Fate & Alcohol is the fourth and final studio album by the Canadian rock duo Japandroids, released on October 18, 2024, by Anti-.

== Background ==
The duo, composed of David Prowse and Brian King, decided to make Fate & Alcohol their last effort due to several factors. A gulf had grown between the two, both geographically—with King in Michigan and Prowse in Vancouver—and personally. "We started as very close friends, and we've kind of grown apart in a lot of different ways, and this seemed like a natural kind of time to close," Prowse told NPR.

== Critical reception ==
Professional ratings
Aggregate scores
Source	Rating
Metacritic	76/100
Review scores
Source	Rating
AllMusic	4/5 stars
The Guardian	3/5 stars
NME	4/5 stars
Paste	8.0/10
Pitchfork	5.9/10

Fate & Alcohol received mostly positive reviews from music critics. According to the review aggregator Metacritic, Fate & Alcohol received "generally favorable reviews" based on a weighted average score of 76 out of 100 from 11 critic scores.

Reviewing the album for AllMusic, Matt Collar declared that it is, "the kind of album that gets into your bloodstream and lingers, ever so slightly shifting the way you see the world and your place in it. If it really is the end for Japandroids, it's a farewell that feels like it could go on forever."

Paste's Eric R. Danton wrote that Fate finds them at the "peak of their power", a "grand finale" both reflective and more mature than past efforts. Craig Howieson of Clash Music called it "the closest they have ever come to perfecting their own sound", while Huw Baines of NME said it "captures the boisterous energy of old while reckoning with their bittersweet farewell." Katie Hawthorne from the Guardian found it middling: "Passionate and bittersweet, Fate & Alcohol is the rare breakup album that suggests this finale is for the best."

Other reviewers were negative. Arielle Gordon of Pitchfork surmised that Fate & Alcohol "comes ready with the booze-soaked conviction, but the keg's finally run dry [...] it strives to rekindle the same spirit that made their first three records sound like the best version of a night of drunken revelry. But with too few innovations and too many well-worn tropes, it lands like those two lonely guys at the bar trying to keep the party going after closing time." Similarly, Brady Gerber at Vulture opined that "this is not how to end your band", calling it a "lazy retread [...] that passionate, life-affirming strain they used to hit in their high notes is gone."

== Track listing ==
All lyrics are written by Brian King, except "A Gaslight Anthem", by David Prowse; all music is composed by Brian King and David Prowse.

Fate & Alcohol track listing
No.	Title	Length
1.	"Eye Contact High"	2:29
2.	"D&T"	3:05
3.	"Alice"	4:28
4.	"Chicago"	3:58
5.	"Upon Sober Reflection"	4:27
6.	"Fugitive Summer"	3:56
7.	"A Gaslight Anthem"	2:30
8.	"Positively 34th Street"	5:03
9.	"One Without the Other"	2:49
10.	"All Bets Are Off"	3:32
Total length:		36:21

== Personnel ==
Japandroids

- Brian King – guitar, vocals, production
- David Prowse – drums, vocals, production

Technical

- Jesse Gander – production, recording, mixing
- Jason Livermore – mastering
