= The House That Heaven Built =

Single by Japandroids

Single by Japandroids

from the album Celebration Rock
- Released: 15 May 2012
- Recorded: 2010–2011; Vancouver, British Columbia, Canada
- Genre: Garage rock, noise pop
- Length: 4:49
- Label: Polyvinyl Record Co.
- Songwriter(s): Brian King, David Prowse
- Producer(s): Japandroids

Japandroids singles chronology
"Heavenward Grand Prix" (2010)	"The House That Heaven Built" (2012)

"The House That Heaven Built" is the fourth 7" single by Canadian rock duo Japandroids. It was released by Polyvinyl Record Co. on May 15, 2012. The initial pressing is limited to 2000 copies on clear vinyl. The song is the first single from Japandroids' second album Celebration Rock.

On February 27, 2013, the song was announced as the winner of a contest to determine the entrance music for the Vancouver Canucks NHL team.

== Critical reception ==
On March 27, 2012, Pitchfork Media awarded the song "The House That Heaven Built" a Best New Music designation, with Pitchfork's Jenn Pelly calling the song "a rapturous head-banger, requiring only one, oft-repeated hook of clearheaded subversiveness: 'And if they try to slow you down/ Tell them all, to go to hell.'" The same website ranked the song #5 on its list of the top 100 tracks of 2012, with Brandon Stosuy writing: "At first, Japandroids reminded me of music and a sensibility from my youthful wanderings: basement shows, photocopied zines, couches you only saw once. But seeing that sing-along made me think about how punk spirit, however you define it, is something that can't be relegated to the past. There will always be rock kids who go to a show wanting to be saved. In 2012, this was their anthem."

Rolling Stone named the song the 24th-best song of 2012.

== Music video ==
A video for "The House That Heaven Built", Japandroids' first and only music video, was released on August 13, 2012. The black-and-white video, directed by Jim Larson and produced by Pitchfork.tv, documented one week in the life of Japandroids on tour using footage from the east coast portion of their spring 2012 US tour, including live footage from shows in Toronto, Montreal, Boston, New York City, Brooklyn, and Washington, D.C.

== Track listing ==
1. "The House That Heaven Built" - 4:49
2. "Jack The Ripper" (Nick Cave and the Bad Seeds cover) - 3:55

== Charts ==
Chart (2012)	Peak position
Canada Alternative Rock (America's Music Charts)	12
