= 2017 in American music =

The following is a list of events and releases that happened in 2017 in music in the United States.

== Notable events ==
=== January ===
- 6 – Dropkick Murphys released their first album in four years, 11 Short Stories of Pain & Glory.
- 9 – Little Big Town performed the National Anthem at the third annual College Football Playoff National Championship at Raymond James Stadium in Tampa, Florida.
- 27 – Bell Biv DeVoe released their first album in sixteen years, Three Stripes.
  - Lauren Alaina released her first album in a little over five years, Road Less Traveled.

=== February ===
- 5 – Luke Bryan performed the National Anthem, and Lady Gaga performed during halftime at Super Bowl LI at NRG Stadium in Houston. Lady Gaga's halftime set garnered 117.5 million television viewers, becoming the second most-watched Super Bowl halftime show in history.
- 6 – Jipsta released his third studio album, Ban2oozle, marking his return to the industry since recovering from the injuries sustained during a hate crime attack in March 2014.
- 12 – The 59th Annual Grammy Awards, hosted by James Corden, took place at the Staples Center in Los Angeles. Adele won the most awards of the night with five wins including Album of the Year for 25. This is the second time she has won Album of the Year after winning for her previous album in 2012, and is the second female to win the award more than once after Taylor Swift. She also won both Record of the Year and Song of the Year for "Hello". Adele ties Paul Simon for the most Grammys won in the general categories, with 7. Chance the Rapper becomes the first ever unsigned artist to win a Grammy. The awards he won are Best New Artist, Best Rap Performance, and Best Rap Album.
- 17 – Alison Krauss released her first solo studio album in seventeen and a half years, Windy City.

=== March ===
- 5 – The iHeartRadio Music Awards took place at The Forum in Inglewood, California.
- 10 – The Shins released their first album in five years, Heartworms.
- Josh Turner released his first album in five years, Deep South.

=== April ===
- 2 – The 52nd Annual Academy of Country Music Awards took place at the T-Mobile Arena in Las Vegas.
- 7 – Michelle Branch released her first studio album in 14 years, Hopeless Romantic.
- 21 – Incubus released their first album in six years, 8.

=== May ===
- 5 – Blondie released their first album in six years, Pollinator.
  - At the Drive-In released In•ter a•li•a, their first studio album in 17 years.
- 12 – Danzig released their first album in seven years, Black Laden Crown.
  - Paramore released their first album in four years, After Laughter. The album marked the return of drummer and co-founder Zac Farro, who had previously departed from the band in 2010.
- 18 – Chris Cornell, frontman for Soundgarden and Audioslave, dies in Detroit at the age of 52 after performing a concert with Soundgarden. It was found that he had hanged himself in his Detroit hotel room. Fans and media outlets took notice of Cornell's choice of date and method and their direct parallels with the suicide of Joy Division frontman Ian Curtis exactly 37 years prior; Joy Division's music was popular among the members of Soundgarden.
- 21 – The Billboard Music Awards took place at the T-Mobile Arena in Las Vegas.
- 23 – Chris Blue won the twelfth season of The Voice. Lauren Duski was named runner-up. Aliyah Moulden and Jesse Larson finished third and fourth place respectively.

=== June ===
- 7 – The CMT Music Awards took place at the Music City Center in Nashville, Tennessee.
- 9 – Katy Perry released her first album in four years, Witness.
  - Glen Campbell released his final studio album and first in four years, Adios.
  - Chuck Berry's first studio album in 38 years (as well as his final album), Chuck, was released, less than 3 months after his death.
- 23 – Imagine Dragons released their 3rd album (and their first album in 2 years), Evolve.
- 30 – Jay-Z released his first album in four years, 4:44.
  - TLC released their first album in fifteen years, TLC.

=== July ===
- 7 – Haim released their first album in four years, Something to Tell You.
- 15 – Dodger Stadium hosts the first night of the Classic West concert. This is the full first Eagles live performance after the death of January 2016 founding member Glenn Frey, his place has been taken by his son Deacon Frey and American Country artist Vince Gill with supporting acts The Doobie Brothers and Steely Dan.
- 16 – Dodger Stadium also hosts the second night of the Classic West concert with Earth, Wind & Fire, Journey, and Fleetwood Mac.
- 20 – Linkin Park and former Stone Temple Pilots and Dead by Sunrise frontman Chester Bennington is found dead at his Los Angeles home from hanging himself. He was 41. Parallels were tied to the suicide even more, on what would have been Chris Cornell's 53rd birthday, Bennington's death occurring only two months after Cornell's death.
- 21 – Parmalee released their first album in four years, 27861.

=== August ===
- 4 – Randy Newman released his first studio new album in nine years, Dark Matter.
  - Dan Wilson released his first solo album in ten years, Re-Covered.
- 8 – Legendary country music singer, songwriter Glen Campbell died after suffering from Alzheimer's disease for six years.
- 11 – Kesha released her first album in five years, Rainbow.
- 25 – Taylor Swift released "Look What You Made Me Do", the lead single from her sixth studio album Reputation. The music video gained 43.2 million views in 24 hours, which broke the 24-hour Vevo record previously held by Adele.
- 27 – The MTV Video Music Awards took place at The Forum in Inglewood, California.

=== September ===
- 8 – Living Colour released their first album in eight years, Shade.
  - Jack Johnson released his first album in four years, All the Light Above It Too.
  - Erin McCarley released her first album in five years, YUYĪ.
  - Troy Gentry of the country music duo Montgomery Gentry was killed in a helicopter crash hours before a concert in New Jersey. He was 50 years old.
- 22 – Fergie released her first album in eleven years, Double Dutchess.
  - The Killers released their first album in five years, Wonderful Wonderful.

=== October ===
- 1 – During Jason Aldean's set at the Route 91 Harvest music festival in Las Vegas, a gunman opens fire, killing 60 people and injuring 869 others.
- 2 – Tom Petty dies of cardiac arrest at his home in Malibu, California at the age of 66.
- 6 – L.A. Guns released their first album in five years, The Missing Piece.
- 13 – Jessie James Decker released her first studio album in nine years, Southern Girl City Lights.
  - P!nk released her first album in five years, Beautiful Trauma.

=== November ===
- 8 – The 51st CMA Awards took place at the Bridgestone Arena in Nashville. This marked the tenth year in a row that Brad Paisley and Carrie Underwood have co-hosted the show.
- 10 – Taylor Swift released her sixth studio album Reputation. It went on to sell 1,238,000 units in the US, and 2,000,000 worldwide in its first week of release.
- 14 – Stone Temple Pilots hire former Dry Cell vocalist Jeff Gutt as their new official lead singer, replacing the late Chester Bennington after a two-year hiatus.
- 17 – Tim McGraw & Faith Hill released their first collaborative album, The Rest of Our Life. The album is Hill's first studio release in twelve years.
- 19 – The American Music Awards took place at the Microsoft Theater.

=== December ===
- 1 – Danielle Bradbery released her first album in four years, I Don't Believe We've Met.
  - – Morbid Angel released their first album in six years, Kingdoms Disdained.
  - – Glassjaw released Material Control, their first album in 15 years.
- 8 – Walker Hayes released his first album in six years, Boom.
- 19 – Chloe Kohanski won the thirteenth season of The Voice. Addison Agen was named runner-up. Brooke Simpson and Red Marlow finishing third and fourth place respectively.

== Bands reformed ==
- The Ace of Cups
- As I Lay Dying
- Audioslave
- Company of Thieves
- The Dangerous Summer
- Eagles
- Eighteen Visions
- House vs. Hurricane
- Iron Monkey
- Jawbreaker
- Light This City
- Madina Lake
- My American Heart
- Nachtmystium
- The Shaggs
- Sugarland
- Tripping Daisy
- Xscape

== Bands formed ==
- Dead Poet Society
- Home Is Where
- Illuminati Hotties
- Little Image
- Powerflo
- Wednesday

== Bands on hiatus ==
- Beach Weather
- Faith No More
- Linkin Park
- Sleepwave
- The Summer Set

== Bands disbanded ==
- Alex & Sierra
- Audioslave
- Bad Seed Rising
- Chairlift
- Cheap Girls
- Cibo Matto
- Cinderella
- Coal Chamber
- The Dillinger Escape Plan
- Emblem3
- Friendzone
- Howler
- Letlive
- Metro Station
- Mindless Behavior
- Mobb Deep
- Montgomery Gentry
- Poured Out
- The Roches
- A Skylit Drive
- Spawn of Possession
- Those Who Fear
- Tom Petty and the Heartbreakers
- Trap Them
- A Tribe Called Quest
- Vanna
- The Walters
- William Control
- Yellowcard
- Your Memorial

== Albums released in 2017 ==
=== January ===
Date	Album	Artist	Genre (s)
6	Nomad	Chasing Safety	Metalcore
6	11 Short Stories of Pain & Glory	Dropkick Murphys	Celtic punk; folk punk
6	Echolocation	Gone Is Gone	Hard rock
6	ReAniMate 3.0: The CoVeRs	Halestorm	Rock
13	Forever	Code Orange	Metalcore
13	Only the Lonely	Colony House	Indie rock
13	Oczy Mlody	The Flaming Lips	Alternative rock
13	Rise	Danny Gokey	Christian pop
13	Puxico	Natalie Hemby	Country
13	The Yunahon Mixtape	Oso Oso	Emo
13	GTTM: Goin Thru the Motions	PnB Rock	Hip hop
13	Feel Your Feelings Fool!	The Regrettes	Punk rock
13	Roman Lips	Omar Rodríguez-López	Electronic
20	AFI	AFI	Alternative rock; punk rock
20	Fifteen Years	The Early November	Acoustic
20	The Search for Everything: Wave One	John Mayer	Blues; pop; rock; soul
20	Kidz Bop 34	Kidz Bop	Pop
20	Fénix	Nicky Jam	Reggaeton
20	Palisades	Palisades	Electronicore
20	The Last Text EP	Jacob Sartorius	Pop
20	Vessels	Starset	Alternative metal; electronic rock
27	Three Stripes	Bell Biv DeVoe	R&B; hip hop
27	Drawing the Target Around the Arrow	CEP	Indie rock; electronic
27	Life Without Sound	Cloud Nothings	Indie rock
27	Tourist in This Town	Allison Crutchfield	Indie rock; alternative rock
27	The Devil Don't Sleep	Brantley Gilbert	Country rock; rock
27	Red Sea Road	Ellie Holcomb	CCM
27	After All These Years	Brian & Jenn Johnson	CCM; Contemporary worship music
27	SweetSexySavage	Kehlani	Alternative R&B
27	Gods of Violence	Kreator	Thrash metal
27	Road Less Traveled	Lauren Alaina	Country; country pop
27	Culture	Migos	Hip hop
27	Nothing Feels Natural	Priests	Post-punk
27	Zen Thrills	Omar Rodríguez-López	Electronic
27	Ty Segall	Ty Segall	Garage rock; lo-fi; psychedelic rock
27	A Girl, a Bottle, a Boat	Train	Pop rock
27	The Continuous Evilution of Life's ?'s	Twiztid	Horrorcore
27	Now 61	Various Artists	Various

=== February ===
Date	Album	Artist	Genre (s)
3	I Decided.	Big Sean	Hip hop
3	Grace Street	Big Wreck	Rock
3	Sing It Now: Songs of Faith & Hope	Reba McEntire	Country; gospel
3	After the Party	The Menzingers	Punk rock; indie rock
3	Remnants	LeAnn Rimes	Country
3	Snowdonia	Surfer Blood	Indie rock; surf rock
3	Fin	Syd	Alternative R&B
10	Zombies on Broadway	Andrew McMahon in the Wilderness	Alternative rock; pop
10	Songs of Cinema	Michael Bolton	Adult contemporary
10	Plata O Plomo	Fat Joe & Remy Ma	Hip hop
10	Memories Are Now	Jesca Hoop	Sub pop
10	Drogas Light	Lupe Fiasco	Hip hop; trap
10	Evolution	Once Human	Melodic death metal
10	The Grinding Wheel	Overkill	Thrash metal
10	FIVE	Prince Royce	
10	Checkered Past (EP)	Save Ferris	Ska punk
14	Teardrops on My Tombstone	Mickey Avalon	Hip hop; alternative hip hop
17	Prisoner	Ryan Adams	Alternative country; rock
17	I'm Only Dreaming	Eisley	Pop; indie pop
17	Plural	Electric Guest	Indie pop
17	FUTURE	Future	Hip hop; trap
17	The Chief	Jidenna	R&B
17	Windy City	Alison Krauss	Country
17	Terrible Human Beings	The Orwells	Punk rock; indie rock
17	All Your Fault	Bebe Rexha	Pop
17	Common as Light and Love Are Red Valleys of Blood	Sun Kil Moon	Folk rock; indie rock
17	Parachute	The Verve Pipe	Alternative rock
20	Odyssey	Eve to Adam	Hard rock
24	Colliding By Design	Acceptance	Alternative rock
24	The Tourist	Clap Your Hands Say Yeah	Indie rock; indie pop
24	Hndrxx	Future	Hip hop; trap
24	The Breaker	Little Big Town	Country
24	Inception	Sanctuary	Thrash metal; power metal
24	Lower the Bar	Steel Panther	
24	Suicide Silence	Suicide Silence	Deathcore

=== March ===
Date	Album	Artist	Genre (s)
3	Bruises	Dia Frampton	Pop; indie pop
3	The Manson Family	Heart Attack Man	Punk rock; pop-punk
3	American Teen	Khalid	Pop; R&B; Soul
3	50 Song Memoir	The Magnetic Fields	Indie pop
3	Voids	Minus the Bear	Indie rock; math rock; experimental rock
10	In Droves	Black Map	Alternative metal
10	Millport	Greg Graffin	Indie folk
10	Godless Prophets & the Migrant Flora	Darkest Hour	Metalcore; melodic death metal
10	Heartworms	The Shins	Indie rock
10	Deep South	Josh Turner	Country; Neotraditional country
17	Rekihndled	Greg Kihn Band	Rock
17	Salutations	Conor Oberst	Indie rock; folk
17	Climate Change	Pitbull	Hip hop; pop
17	Rather You Than Me	Rick Ross	Hip hop
17	Hot Thoughts	Spoon	Indie rock
24	Whiplash Splash	The Dollyrots	Pop punk
24	WildHorse	RaeLynn	Country
24	Rock and Roll Bye Bye	Skaters	Garage rock
31	Bloodlust	Body Count	Heavy metal
31	Triplicate	Bob Dylan	Traditional pop; vocal jazz
31	As the Sun Sleeps	Invidia	Hard rock; heavy metal
31	Emperor of Sand	Mastodon	Heavy metal
31	Brand New Day	The Mavericks	Americana; Tex-Mex
31	Already All Ready	La'Porsha Renae	R&B

=== April ===
Date	Album	Artist	Genre (s)
7	Hopeless Romantic	Michelle Branch	Indie pop
7	All-Amerikkkan Badass	Joey Bada$$	Hip hop
7	Memories...Do Not Open	The Chainsmokers	Pop
7	L.A. Divine	Cold War Kids	Rock; indie rock
7	Coming Home	Falling in Reverse	Metal
7	Pure Comedy	Father John Misty	Indie folk; indie rock
7	The Far Field	Future Islands	Indie pop; synthpop
7	August by Cake	Guided by Voices	Indie rock; lo-fi
7	Every Where Is Some Where	K.Flay	Alternative hip hop; alternative rock
7	Lovely Little Lonely	The Maine	Pop rock; alternative rock
7	The World's Best American Band	White Reaper	Garage rock; blues rock
13	Guppy	Charly Bliss	Indie rock; power pop
14	Hamartia	Novembers Doom	Doom metal
14	The Search for Everything	John Mayer	R&B, blues, rock, pop
14	Damn	Kendrick Lamar	Hip hop
14	WICK	Royal Thunder	Hard rock
21	Guppy	Charly Bliss	Indie rock; indie pop; power pop
21	How Will You Know If You Never Try	Coin	Indie rock; pop rock; alternative rock
21	Be Myself	Sheryl Crow	Rock
21	Side B	Christina Grimmie	Pop; electropop
21	8	Incubus	Alternative rock
21	Love and War	Brad Paisley	Country
21	Wrangled	Angaleena Presley	Country
28	Places	Lea Michele	Pop
28	Sad Clowns & Hillbillies	John Mellencamp	
28	God's Problem Child	Willie Nelson	Country
28	Makes Me Sick	New Found Glory	Pop punk
28	50 Years of Blonde on Blonde	Old Crow Medicine Show	Folk; country
28	What Now	Sylvan Esso	Synth-pop; indie pop
28	Shine	Wale	Hip hop

=== May ===
Date	Album	Artist	Genre (s)
5	In Spades	The Afghan Whigs	Alternative rock
5	In•ter a•li•a	At the Drive-In	Alternative rock; post-hardcore
5	Pollinator	Blondie	Alternative rock; new wave; post-punk revival
5	The Days We Had	Day Wave	Indie rock; indie pop; synthpop
5	Noenemies	Flobots	Alternative hip hop; rock
5	Everybody	Logic	Hip hop
5	Big Bad Luv	John Moreland	Country
5	Graveyard Shift	Motionless in White	Metalcore; nu metal; industrial metal
5	No Shape	Perfume Genius	Art pop; indie pop
5	From A Room: Volume 1	Chris Stapleton	
12	Night Drive	Cannons	Indie rock
12	Young Stunners	Junior Prom	Alternative rock
12	After Laughter	Paramore	Alternative rock
12	Welcome Home	Zac Brown Band	Country
19	Shake the Shudder	!!!	Dance-punk; indie rock
19	Step into Light	Fastball	Pop rock; alternative rock
19	Things Change	Grabbitz	EDM; electronic; dubstep
19	One More Light	Linkin Park	
19	In the Wind	Magic Giant	Indie pop; alternative rock
19	Undercurrent	Matisyahu	Reggae; reggae rock; Jewish hip hop; alternative hip hop
19	Loner	Missio	Electronic
19	Connect the Dots	MisterWives	Indie pop
19	Crooked Teeth	Papa Roach	Rock; Nu Metal; Rap Rock
19	Back to Us	Rascal Flatts	Country
19	You're Welcome	Wavves	Indie rock; punk rock; alternative rock
26	Black Laden Crown	Danzig	Heavy metal; Hard rock
26	Kids in the Street	Justin Townes Earle	Country
26	Other People's Greatest Hits	Patent Pending	Pop rock; pop-punk
26	3-D The Catalogue	Kraftwerk	Electronic Music; New Wave; Electronica

=== June ===
Date	Album	Artist	Genre (s)
2	We the People	Adrenaline Mob	Alternative metal; heavy metal; hard rock
2	Last Young Renegade	All Time Low	Pop punk; pop rock
2	Waiting on a Song	Dan Auerbach	Blues rock
2	Gone Now	Bleachers	Synth-pop; indie rock
2	I Used to Spend So Much Time Alone	Chastity Belt	Indie rock; indie pop; noise pop
2	City of No Reply	Amber Coffman	Indie rock
2	Life Is Good	Flogging Molly	Celtic punk; alternative rock
2	Hopeless Fountain Kingdom	Halsey	Pop
9	The Click	AJR	Pop; electropop; indie pop
9	Chuck	Chuck Berry	Rock
9	Saturation	Brockhampton	Hip hop; alternative hip hop
9	All Is Vanity	Christina Grimmie	Pop; electropop
9	Heart Break	Lady Antebellum	Country
9	Witness	Katy Perry	Pop
9	Purple Rain Deluxe	Prince	Pop
9	Trouble Maker	Rancid	Punk rock
9	Wolves	Rise Against	Melodic hardcore
9	You Don't Own Me Anything	The Secret Sisters	Country
9	Planetarium	Sufjan Stevens/Bryce Dessner/Nico Muhly/James McAlister	
16	Fake Sugar	Beth Ditto	Rock
16	Paradise	Broadside	Pop punk
16	Living Arrangements	Color Film	New wave; post-punk
16	Abysmal Thoughts	The Drums	Indie pop; indie rock
16	Crack-Up	Fleet Foxes	Indie folk; Baroque pop; progressive folk; progressive rock
16	Incorruptible	Iced Earth	Heavy metal
16	The Nashville Sound	Jason Isbell	Americana; alternative country
16	Woodstock	Portugal. The Man	Alternative rock; indie rock
23	Mosaic	311	Alternative rock; reggae rock; rap rock
23	The Underside of Power	Algiers	Experimental rock
23	ƎVOLVE	Imagine Dragons	Rock
23	Big Fish Theory	Vince Staples	Hi hop
23	Grateful	DJ Khaled	
30	Man of the World	Baio	Indie rock
30	4:44	Jay-Z	Hip Hop
30	LANY	LANY	Electropop
30	Unparalleled Universe	Origin	Technical death metal
30	Don't You Worry, Honey	Sir Sly	Alternative rock; psychedelic rock
30	Hydrograd	Stone Sour	Alternative rock
30	TLC	TLC	G-funk; R&B; Hip hop; indie
30	Mister Mellow	Washed Out	Electronic; synth-pop; chillwave; indie pop

=== July ===
Date	Album	Artist	Genre (s)
7	Something to Tell You	Haim	Pop rock; R&B
7	Girl Disrupted	Sevyn Streeter	R&B; pop; soul
14	Juniper Road	Dishwalla	Alternative rock
14	Quazarz: Robed in Rareness	Shabazz Palaces	Experimental hip hop
14	Quazarz: Born on a Gangster Star	Shabazz Palaces	Experimental hip hop
14	Out in the Storm	Waxahatchee	Indie rock
19	Add Violence (EP)	Nine Inch Nails	Industrial rock
21	Sacred Hearts Club	Foster the People	Indie pop; alternative rock
21	The Knife	Goldfinger	Pop punk
21	Lust for Life	Lana Del Rey	Pop
21	Lay It on Down	Kenny Wayne Shepherd	Rock
21	Flower Boy	Tyler, The Creator	Alternative hip hop, Jazz rap, Soul
28	Paranormal	Alice Cooper	Rock
28	Content	Joywave	Indie rock; alternative rock
28	Tremendous Sea of Love	Passion Pit	Electropop; indie pop
28	Red Hands Black Deeds	Shaman's Harvest	Rock
29	A Black Mile to the Surface	Manchester Orchestra	Indie rock

=== August ===
Date	Album	Artist	Genre (s)
4	Brett Eldredge	Brett Eldredge	Country
4	One of Us	Mystery Skulls	Electronica; indie pop
4	Dark Matter	Randy Newman	
4	All We Know of Heaven, All We Need of Hell	PVRIS	Electropop
4	Revival	Third Day	Christian rock; southern rock
4	Deadweight	Wage War	Metalcore
4	Re-Covered	Dan Wilson	Folk rock; alternative rock
11	Ballads	Paula Cole	Jazz; folk
11	Cost of Living	Downtown Boys	Punk rock
11	Rainbow	Kesha	Pop; dance; electropop
11	Musings	Little Image	Pop rock; indie pop
11	Cage Tropical	Frankie Rose	Electropop
14	Road Rage	Quiet Riot	Heavy metal; glam metal; hard rock
15	Come Over When You're Sober, Pt. 1	Lil Peep	Rap rock
17	Science Fiction	Brand New	Alternative rock; post-hardcore
18	Painted Ruins	Grizzly Bear	Indie rock; folk rock; indie pop
18	1 Up Top Ahk	Mozzy	Rap
25	Exile in the Outer Ring	EMA	Noise rock
25	Legacy	The Cadillac Three	Southern rock
25	Fifth Harmony	Fifth Harmony	Pop; R&B
25	Invitation	Filthy Friends	Alternative rock
25	Bad Habits	Giovannie and the Hired Guns	Country rock
25	TFCF	Liars	Rock
25	Happy Endings	Old Dominion	Country
25	Villains	Queens of the Stone Age	Hard rock; stoner rock
25	A Deeper Understanding	The War on Drugs	Indie rock

=== September ===
Date	Album	Artist	Genre (s)
1	American Dream	LCD Soundsystem	Rock; Dance-rock; electro
1	Songs of Bob Dylan	Joan Osborne	Rock
1	The Echo of Pleasure	The Pains of Being Pure at Heart	Indie pop
8	Southern Blood	Gregg Allman	Southern rock; blues; soul
8	Native Invader	Tori Amos	
8	Left Hand Pass	Cannabis Corpse	Death metal; parody
8	Mountain Moves	Deerhoof	Indie rock
8	All the Light Above It Too	Jack Johnson	Folk rock; soft rock
8	The Hanged Man	Ted Leo	
8	Shade	Living Colour	Hard rock; funk rock
8	YU YĪ	Erin McCarley	Alternative
8	Slowheart	Kip Moore	Country
8	Play Dead	Mutemath	Alternative rock; indie rock; Christian rock
8	Sleep Well Beast	The National	Alternative Rock
8	Life Changes	Thomas Rhett	Country; country pop
8	Half-Light	Rostam	Indie pop; indie rock
8	The Lower Side of Uptown	Toadies	Alternative rock
8	Closer	Wild Cub	Indie rock; indie pop
8	Okovi	Zola Jesus	Gothic rock; dark wave
15	Rookie	Black Kids	Indie rock; indie pop
15	Golden Rail Motel	Eamon	R&B; soul; pop
15	Concrete and Gold	Foo Fighters	Rock
15	Rebel Heart Tour	Madonna	Pop; live
15	Mr. Davis	Gucci Mane	Hip hop
15	Wide Open	Michael McDonald	Pop; Blue Eyed Soul
15	Prophets of Rage	Prophets of Rage	Rap rock
15	Future Friends	Sup3rfruit	Pop
22	Stranger in the Alps	Phoebe Bridgers	Indie rock; emo
22	The Amulet	Circa Survive	Alternative rock; progressive rock
22	Double Dutchess	Fergie	Pop
22	Wonderful Wonderful	The Killers	Rock
22	Cities in Search of a Heart	The Movielife	Pop punk; emo
22	Nobody's Home	Dalton Rapattoni	Alternative; alternative pop
22	What's That Sound?	Haley Reinhart	Pop
22	Gossip	Sleeping with Sirens	Pop rock
22	Hiss Spun	Chelsea Wolfe	Folk rock; electronica
29	Younger Now	Miley Cyrus	Pop
29	Inside a Dream	Echosmith	Indie pop
29	The Centre Cannot Hold	Ben Frost	Electronic
29	Destroyers of the Soft Life	J. Roddy Walston and the Business	Southern rock
29	Tell Me You Love Me	Demi Lovato	Pop; R&B
29	The Desaturating Seven	Primus	Progressive rock
29	Three Futures	Torres	Folk rock; alternative
29	Always Foreign	The World Is a Beautiful Place & I Am No Longer Afraid to Die	Indie rock; post-rock

=== October ===
Date	Album	Artist	Genre (s)
6	Phantom Anthem	August Burns Red	Melodic metalcore
6	Offering	Cults	Indie pop
6	Take Me Apart	Kelela	Alternative R&B
6	The Missing Peace	L.A. Guns	Heavy metal; hard rock
6	Heaven Upside Down	Marilyn Manson	Gothic rock; industrial metal; heavy metal
6	Perception	NF	Rap; hip hop
6	Poppy.Computer	Poppy	Pop
6	You Make It Feel Like Christmas	Gwen Stefani	Christmas
13	Gossip Columns	Marc E. Bassy	Hip hop
13	Colors	Beck	Alternative
13	Ogilala	William Patrick Corgan	Alternative rock
13	Southern Girl City Lights	Jessie James Decker	Country pop
13	Yours	Russell Dickerson	Country pop
13	Swim Team	Dirty Heads	Alternative rock; reggae rock; alternative hip hop
13	Going Grey	The Front Bottoms	Indie rock; folk punk; alternative rock
13	Mr. Davis	Gucci Mane	Hip hop
13	Every Little Thing	Carly Pearce	Country
13	Beautiful Trauma	P!nk	Pop
13	MASSEDUCTION	St. Vincent	Indie rock; art rock
17	Strangler Days	Middle Class Rut	Alternative rock
20	Let It Snow	98 Degrees	Christmas
20	Under the Streetlight	Boyz II Men	R&B
20	Losing	Bully	Indie rock; punk rock
20	Christmas Christmas	Cheap Trick	Christmas; hard rock; power pop
20	11:11 Reset	Keyshia Cole	R&B
20	Feel Something	Movements	Post-hardcore; emo
20	Reaper	Nothing,Nowhere	Emo rap; indie rock
20	All American Made	Margo Price	Americana; country
20	When Was the Last Time	Darius Rucker	Country
20	Warmer in the Winter	Lindsey Stirling	Christmas; crossover classical
20	The Sin and the Sentence	Trivium	Heavy metal; thrash metal; metalcore; progressive metal
20	A Long Way from Your Heart	Turnpike Troubadours	Americana; roots rock; folk rock
20	From Then On	Paul van Dyk	Trance
20	Losing Sleep	Chris Young	Country
27	Q, Mike, Slim, Daron	112	R&B; soul
27	Meaning of Life	Kelly Clarkson	Pop; Soul; R&B
27	Finally It's Christmas	Hanson	Christmas
27	Five	Hollywood Undead	Rap rock
27	Screen Memories	John Maus	
27	Waves	Rachel Platten	Pop
27	Nat King Cole & Me	Gregory Porter	Jazz
27	New Wave	Powerman 5000	Industrial rock; hard rock; nu metal
27	When the Good Guys Win	Granger Smith	Country
27	Beach House 3	Ty Dolla Sign	Hip hop
27	The Canyon	The Used	Post-hardcore; alternative rock
27	Pacific Daydream	Weezer	Pop punk; alternative rock
27	The Lonely, the Lonesome & the Gone	Lee Ann Womack	Americana; Country; country blues; southern soul
27	Trial by Fire	Yelawolf	Hip hop; country rap
27	Under the Covers, Vol. II	Ninja Sex Party	Rock, synthpop, progressive rock, glam rock

=== November ===
Date	Album	Artist	Genre (s)
3	American Fall	Anti-Flag	Punk rock
3	Unapologetically	Kelsea Ballerini	Country
3	Lee Brice	Lee Brice	Country
3	The Dusk in Us	Converge	Metalcore; Hardcore punk
3	Sweet Southern Sugar	Kid Rock	Rock; country
3	Red Pill Blues	Maroon 5	Pop
3	Texoma Shore	Blake Shelton	Country
3	Overexposed	Sleep On It	Pop punk
3	Just the Beginning	Grace VanderWaal	Pop
10	Synthesis	Evanescence	Electronica
10	Alpha / Omega	Kutless	Christian rock, worship
10	Kid Kruschev (EP)	Sleigh Bells	Noise pop
10	Reputation	Taylor Swift	Electropop; R&B; trap
10	What If Nothing	Walk the Moon	Rock
17	Ascending a Mountain of Heavy Light	Full of Hell	Metalcore
17	The Rest of Our Life	Tim McGraw & Faith Hill	Country
17	I Fall in Love Too Easy	Katharine McPhee	Pop
17	I Knew You When	Bob Seger	Rock
17	Syre	Jaden Smith	Rap
17	If All I Was Was Black	Mavis Staples	R&B; Soul
24	Glory Days: The Platinum Edition	Little Mix	Pop
24	PRETTYMUCH	PRETTYMUCH	Pop
24	Squeeze Box: The Complete Works of "Weird Al" Yankovic	"Weird Al" Yankovic	Comedy
24	No Shame	Hopsin	Hip hop
24	What More Could You Ask for?	Futuristic	Hip hop

=== December ===
Date	Album	Artist	Genre (s)
1	I Don't Believe We've Met	Danielle Bradbery	Country pop
1	Material Control	Glassjaw	Post-hardcore; alternative rock
1	Kingdoms Disdained	Morbid Angel	Death metal
1	From A Room: Volume 2	Chris Stapleton	Country
1	Change	Cindy Wilson	Pop
5	Sheep Among Wolves	Project 86	Christian rock; post-hardcore
8	Aberration	Aidan Baker	Ambient
8	What Makes You Country	Luke Bryan	Country
8	Wolves	Story of the Year	Melodic hardcore
8	Boom	Walker Hayes	Country
15	The Stage (Deluxe Edition)	Avenged Sevenfold	Heavy metal
15	Revival	Eminem	Hip Hop, Rap
15	These Are the Days	Lit	Country rock
15	No One Ever Really Dies	N.E.R.D.	Alternative hip hop
22	Philthy Fresh 3	Philthy Rich & Stevie J	Hip Hop, Rap
22	El Gato The Human Glacier	Gucci Mane	Hip hop, Rap
29	Dedication 6	Lil Wayne	Hip Hop, Rap
29	Rubba Band Business	Juicy J	Hip Hop, Rap

== Top songs on record ==
=== Billboard Hot 100 No. 1 Songs ===
- "Bad and Boujee" – Migos feat. Lil Uzi Vert (3 weeks)
- "Black Beatles" – Rae Sremmurd feat. Gucci Mane (6 weeks in 2016, 1 week in 2017)
- "Bodak Yellow" – Cardi B (3 weeks)
- "Despacito" – Luis Fonsi and Daddy Yankee feat. Justin Bieber (16 weeks)
- "Humble" – Kendrick Lamar (1 week)
- "I'm the One" – DJ Khaled feat. Justin Bieber, Quavo, Chance the Rapper and Lil Wayne (1 week)
- "Look What You Made Me Do" – Taylor Swift (3 weeks)
- "Perfect" – Ed Sheeran and Beyoncé (2 weeks)
- "Rockstar" – Post Malone feat. 21 Savage (8 weeks)
- "Shape of You" – Ed Sheeran (12 weeks)
- "Starboy" – The Weeknd feat. Daft Punk (1 week)
- "That's What I Like" – Bruno Mars (1 week)

=== Billboard Hot 100 Top 20 Hits ===
All songs that reached the Top 20 on the Billboard Hot 100 chart during the year, complete with peak chart placement.

- "1-800-273-8255" – Logic feat. Alessia Cara and Khalid (#3)
- "2U" – David Guetta feat. Justin Bieber (#16)
- "24K Magic" – Bruno Mars (#4)
- "All I Want for Christmas Is You" – Mariah Carey (#9)
- "All Time Low" – Jon Bellion (#16)
- "Almost Like Praying" – Lin-Manuel Miranda feat. Artists for Puerto Rico (#20)
- "Attention" – Charlie Puth (#5)
- "Bad and Boujee" – Migos feat. Lil Uzi Vert (#1)
- "Bad at Love" – Halsey (#8)
- "Bad Liar" – Selena Gomez (#20)
- "Bad Things" – Machine Gun Kelly and Camila Cabello (#4)
- "Bank Account" – 21 Savage (#12)
- "Believer" – Imagine Dragons (#4)
- "Black Beatles" – Rae Sremmurd feat. Gucci Mane (#1)
- "Bodak Yellow" – Cardi B (#1)
- "Body Like a Back Road" – Sam Hunt (#6)
- "Bounce Back" – Big Sean (#6)
- "Broccoli" – DRAM feat. Lil Yachty (#5 in 2016, #10 in 2017)
- "Can't Stop the Feeling!" – Justin Timberlake (#1 in 2016, #13 in 2017)
- "Caroline" – Aminé (#11)
- "Castle on the Hill" – Ed Sheeran (#6)
- "Chained to the Rhythm" – Katy Perry feat. Skip Marley (#4)
- "Closer" – The Chainsmokers feat. Halsey (#1 in 2016, #3 in 2017)
- "Cold" – Maroon 5 feat. Future (#16)
- "Congratulations" – Post Malone feat. Quavo (#8)
- "Despacito" – Luis Fonsi and Daddy Yankee feat. Justin Bieber (#1)
- "DNA" – Kendrick Lamar (#4)
- "Don't Wanna Know" – Maroon 5 feat. Kendrick Lamar (#6)
- "Element" – Kendrick Lamar (#16)
- "Fake Love" – Drake (#8)
- "Feel It Still" – Portugal. The Man (#4)
- "Feels" – Calvin Harris feat. Pharrell Williams, Katy Perry and Big Sean (#20)
- "Free Smoke" – Drake (#18)
- "Friends" – Justin Bieber and BloodPop (#20)
- "Gorgeous" – Taylor Swift (#13)
- "Green Light" – Lorde (#19)
- "Gucci Gang" – Lil Pump (#3)
- "Gummo" – 6ix9ine (#12)
- "Havana" – Camila Cabello feat. Young Thug (#2)
- "Heathens" – Twenty One Pilots (#2 in 2016, #12 in 2017)
- "Humble" – Kendrick Lamar (#1)
- "I Don't Wanna Live Forever" – Zayn and Taylor Swift (#2)
- "I Fall Apart" – Post Malone (#19)
- "I Feel It Coming" – The Weeknd feat. Daft Punk (#4)
- "I Get the Bag" – Gucci Mane feat. Migos (#11)
- "I'm the One" – DJ Khaled feat. Justin Bieber, Quavo, Chance the Rapper and Lil Wayne (#1)
- "In Case You Didn't Know" – Brett Young (#19)
- "iSpy" – Kyle feat. Lil Yachty (#4)
- "Issues" – Julia Michaels (#11)
- "It Ain't Me" – Kygo and Selena Gomez (#10)
- "Juju on that Beat (TZ Anthem)" – Zay Hilfigerrr and Zayion McCall (#5)
- "Let Me Love You" – DJ Snake feat. Justin Bieber (#4)
- "Let You Down" – NF (#16)
- "Location" – Khalid (#16)
- "Look What You Made Me Do" – Taylor Swift (#1)
- "Love" – Kendrick Lamar feat. Zacari (#18)
- "Love on the Brain" – Rihanna (#5)
- "Loyalty" – Kendrick Lamar feat. Rihanna (#14)
- "Malibu" – Miley Cyrus (#10)
- "Mask Off" – Future (#5)
- "Mercy" – Shawn Mendes (#15)
- "Mi Gente" – J Balvin and Willy William feat. Beyoncé (#3)
- "Million Reasons" – Lady Gaga (#4)
- "MotorSport" – Migos, Nicki Minaj and Cardi B (#6)
- "New Rules" – Dua Lipa (#14 in 2017, #6 in 2018)
- "No Frauds" – Nicki Minaj, Drake and Lil Wayne (#14)
- "No Limit" – G-Eazy feat. ASAP Rocky and Cardi B (#7)
- "Now or Never" – Halsey (#17)
- "Ooouuu" – Young M.A (#19)
- "Paris" – The Chainsmokers (#6)
- "Passionfruit" – Drake (#8)
- "Perfect" – Ed Sheeran and Beyoncé (#1)
- "Portland" – Drake feat. Quavo and Travis Scott (#9)
- "Rake It Up" – Yo Gotti feat. Nicki Minaj (#8)
- "...Ready for It?" – Taylor Swift (#4)
- "Redbone" – Childish Gambino (#12)
- "Rockabye" – Clean Bandit feat. Sean Paul and Anne-Marie (#9)
- "Rockstar" – Post Malone feat. 21 Savage (#1)
- "Rolex" – Ayo & Teo (#20)
- "Say You Won't Let Go" – James Arthur (#11)
- "Scars to Your Beautiful" – Alessia Cara (#8)
- "Shape of You" – Ed Sheeran (#1)
- "Side to Side" – Ariana Grande feat. Nicki Minaj (#4 in 2016, #6 in 2017)
- "Sign of the Times" – Harry Styles (#4)
- "Slow Hands" – Niall Horan (#11)
- "Something Just Like This" – The Chainsmokers and Coldplay (#3)
- "Sorry Not Sorry" – Demi Lovato (#6)
- "Starboy" – The Weeknd feat. Daft Punk (#1)
- "Starving" – Hailee Steinfeld and Grey feat. Zedd (#12 in 2016, #17 in 2017)
- "Stay" – Zedd and Alessia Cara (#7)
- "Strip That Down" – Liam Payne feat. Quavo (#10)
- "T-Shirt" – Migos (#19)
- "That's What I Like" – Bruno Mars (#1)
- "There's Nothing Holdin' Me Back" – Shawn Mendes (#6)
- "This Town" – Niall Horan (#20)
- "Thunder" – Imagine Dragons (#4)
- "Too Good at Goodbyes" – Sam Smith (#4)
- "Tunnel Vision" – Kodak Black (#6)
- "Unforgettable" – French Montana feat. Swae Lee (#3)
- "Walk on Water" – Eminem feat. Beyoncé (#14)
- "What About Us" – Pink (#13)
- "What Lovers Do" – Maroon 5 feat. SZA (#9)
- "Wild Thoughts" – DJ Khaled feat. Rihanna and Bryson Tiller (#2)
- "Wolves" – Selena Gomez and Marshmello (#20)
- "XO Tour Llif3" – Lil Uzi Vert (#7)

== Deaths ==
- January 6 – Sylvester Potts, 78, singer (The Contours)
- January 8 – Buddy Bregman, 86, arranger, producer, and composer
- January 9 – Crazy Toones, 45, hip-hop record producer and DJ (WC and the Maad Circle)
- January 10 – Buddy Greco, 90, jazz and pop singer and actor
- January 11 – Tommy Allsup, 85, rockabilly and swing musician
- January 13 –
  - Dick Gautier, 85, actor and singer
  - Richie Ingui, 69, singer (Soul Survivors)
  - Alan Jabbour, 74, fiddler and folklorist
- January 15 – Greg Trooper, 61, singer-songwriter
- January 16 –
  - Charles "Bobo" Shaw, 69, jazz drummer
  - Steve Wright, bassist (The Greg Kihn Band)
- January 18 – Roberta Peters, 86, coloratura soprano
- January 20 –
  - Ronald "Bingo" Mundy, 76, singer (The Marcels)
  - Joey Powers, 82, singer-songwriter
  - Tommy Tate, 71, singer-songwriter
- January 21 –
  - Karl Hendricks, 46, singer-songwriter and guitarist (The Karl Hendricks Trio)
  - Walter "Junie" Morrison, 62, keyboardist (Ohio Players)
  - Maggie Roche, 65, singer-songwriter (The Roches)
- January 23 –
  - Bobby Freeman, 76, singer
  - Marvell Thomas, 75, keyboardist, record producer and arranger
- January 24 –
  - Gil Ray, 60, drummer (Game Theory, The Loud Family)
  - Butch Trucks, 69, drummer (The Allman Brothers Band)
- January 27 – Stan Boreson, 91, comedian, accordionist and singer
- January 28 – Guitar Gable, 79, blues guitarist and singer
- February 5
  - David Axelrod, 85, arranger, composer and record producer (The Electric Prunes)
  - Sonny Geraci, 70, singer (The Outsiders, Climax)
- February 12
  - Barbara Carroll, 92, jazz pianist and singer
  - Robert Fisher, 59, singer (Willard Grant Conspiracy)
  - Al Jarreau, 76, singer
- February 17 – Dave Yorko, 73, guitarist (Johnny and the Hurricanes)
- February 18 – Clyde Stubblefield, 73, drummer
- February 19 – Larry Coryell, 73, jazz guitarist
- February 23 – Leon Ware, 77, singer-songwriter and record producer
- February 28 – Ric Marlow, 91, songwriter and actor
- March 3 – Jim Fuller, 69, guitarist (The Surfaris)
- March 4
  - Valerie Carter, 64, singer-songwriter
  - Tommy Page, 46, singer-songwriter
- March 6
  - Ritchie Adams, 78, songwriter and singer (The Fireflies)
  - Robbie Hoddinott, 62, guitarist (Kingfish)
- March 8 – Dave Valentin, 64, jazz flutist
- March 10 – Joni Sledge, 60, singer (Sister Sledge)
- March 11 –
  - Evan Johns, 60, guitarist (The LeRoi Brothers)
  - Don Warden, 87, country musician and manager
- March 12 –
  - Joey Alves, 63, guitarist (Y&T)
  - Robert "P-Nut" Johnson, 69, singer (Bootsy's Rubber Band, Sweat Band)
- March 13 – Tommy LiPuma, 80, music producer
- March 16 – James Cotton, 81, blues harmonica player
- March 18 – Chuck Berry, 90, singer-songwriter and guitarist
- March 20 –
  - Tony Terran, 90, trumpeter, and session musician
  - Buck Hill, 90, jazz saxophonist
- March 22 – Sib Hashian, 67, drummer (Boston)
- March 24 – Avo Uvezian, 91, Armenian-American jazz pianist, and cigar manufacturer
- March 26 – Jimmy Dotson, 83, blues musician
- March 27 – Arthur Blythe, 76, jazz alto saxophonist, and composer
- March 28 – Terry Fischer, 70, singer (The Murmaids)
- March 30 – Rosie Hamlin, 71, singer (Rosie and the Originals)
- April 1 –
  - Lonnie Brooks, 83, blues singer and guitarist
  - Bob Cunningham, 82, jazz bassist
- April 3 – Brenda Jones, 62, singer (The Jones Girls)
- April 5 – Paul O'Neill, 61, producer, composer and songwriter (Trans-Siberian Orchestra)
- April 6 – David Peel, 74, musician and political activist
- April 8 – Keni Richards, 60, drummer (Autograph)
- April 9 – Bob Wootton, 75, guitarist (The Tennessee Three)
- April 10 –
  - Linda Hopkins, 92, actress and blues and gospel singer
  - Banner Thomas, 62, bassist (Molly Hatchet)
- April 11 –
  - J. Geils, 71, guitarist (The J. Geils Band)
  - Scotty Miller, 65, drummer (Instant Funk)
- April 12 –
  - Tom Coyne, 62, Grammy award-winning mastering engineer (21, 25)
  - Barry "Frosty" Smith, 71, drummer (Sweathog, Soulhat)
- April 14 – Bruce Langhorne, 78, folk musician
- April 15 –
  - Matt Holt, 39, singer (Nothingface)
  - Sylvia Moy, 78, songwriter
- April 19 – Dick Contino, 87, accordionist
- April 20 – Cuba Gooding Sr., 72, singer (The Main Ingredient)
- May 2 – Kevin Garcia, 41, bassist (Grandaddy)
- May 9 – Michael Parks, 77, actor and singer
- May 10 – Pierre DeMudd, 64, trumpeter and singer (Dazz Band)
- May 14 – Keith Mitchell, drummer (Mazzy Star)
- May 17 – Chris Cornell, 52, singer-songwriter and musician (Soundgarden, Audioslave)
- May 21
  - Kenny Cordray, 62, guitarist and songwriter
  - Jimmy LaFave, 61, folk singer-songwriter and guitarist
  - Curtis Womack, 74, singer (The Valentinos)
- May 22 – Mickey Roker, 84, jazz drummer
- May 27 – Gregg Allman, 69, singer-songwriter and musician (The Allman Brothers Band)
- May 29 – Arleen Lanzotti, 73, pop singer (The Delicates)
- May 31 – Bern Nix, 69, jazz guitarist (worked with Ornette Coleman)
- June 8 – Norro Wilson, 79, singer-songwriter and record producer
- June 20
  - Prodigy, 42, rapper (Mobb Deep)
  - Bo Wagner, 72, marimba player (Starbuck)
- June 22 – Jimmy Nalls, 66, guitarist (Sea Level)
- June 28 – Gary DeCarlo, 75, singer-songwriter (Steam)
- July 9 – Erik Cartwright, 66, guitarist (Foghat)
- July 13 – Chris Wong Won, 53, rapper (2 Live Crew)
- July 14 – David Zablidowsky, 38, bass guitarist
- July 20 – Chester Bennington, 41, singer, songwriter, musician (Linkin Park)
- July 25 – Michael Johnson, 72, singer-songwriter
- July 27 – Billy Joe Walker Jr., 64, record producer
- July 28 – D.L. Menard, 85, Cajun singer
- July 31 – Chuck Loeb, 61, drummer (Fourplay)
- August 8 – Glen Campbell, 81, country singer, songwriter, actor
- August 20 – Jerry Lewis, 91, actor and singer
- August 21 – Sonny Burgess, 88, rockabilly singer
- August 22 – John Abercrombie, 73, jazz guitarist
- August 29 – Larry Elgart, 95, jazz bandleader and alto saxophonist
- September 2 – Dave Hlubek, 66, guitarist (Molly Hatchet)
- September 3 – Walter Becker, 67, jazz guitarist, songwriter, record producer (Steely Dan)
- September 8 –
  - Troy Gentry, 50, country singer (Montgomery Gentry)
  - Don Williams, 78, singer
- September 13 – Grant Hart, 56, drummer and songwriter (Hüsker Dü)
- September 22
  - Eric Eycke, 41 heavy metal singer (Corrosion of Conformity)
  - Ammon Tharp, 75, drummer (Bill Deal and the Rhondels)
- September 23 – Charles Bradley, 68, soul singer
- September 27 – CeDell Davis, 91, blues guitarist
- September 30 – Tom Paley, 89, folk guitarist and banjoist
- October 2 – Tom Petty, 66, rock singer and songwriter
- October 4 – Janis Hansen, 74, singer (Sérgio Mendes & Brasil '66, The Carnival)
- October 5 – Alvin DeGuzman, 42, hardcore guitarist
- October 6 – Bunny Sigler, 76, singer songwriter and record producer
- October 7 – Jimmy Beaumont, 76, doo-wop singer (The Skyliners)
- October 8 – Grady Tate, 85, jazz drummer and singer
- October 22
  - Al Hurricane, 81, folk singer and songwriter
  - Scott Putesky, 49, guitarist (Marilyn Manson)
- October 24
  - Fats Domino, 89, soul singer
  - Larry Raye, 63, guitarist
- October 27 –
  - Mike Hudson, 61, punk rock singer
  - Dick Noel, 90, big band singer
- October 28 – Bruce Black, 56, heavy metal drummer (Meliah Rage)
- October 29
  - Billy Mize, 88, steel guitarist, band leader and singer-songwriter
  - Keith Wilder, 65, funk singer (Heatwave)
- November 1
  - Katie Lee, 98, folk singer
  - Scott Wily, singer
- November 5
  - Danny Anaya, 52, heavy metal drummer (MX Machine)
  - Robert Knight, 72, singer-songwriter
- November 9
  - Fred Cole, 69, garage singer and guitarist
  - Chuck Mosley, 57, singer-songwriter (Faith No More)
- November 12 – Chad Hanks, 46, bassist (American Head Charge)
- November 15 – Lil Peep, 21, Swedish-American rapper and singer
- November 18 – Ben Riley, 84, jazz drummer
- November 19
  - Warren "Pete" Moore, 79, singer-songwriter (The Miracles)
  - Della Reese, 86, singer and actress
  - Mel Tillis, 85, country singer
- November 21
  - David Cassidy, 67, singer and actor
  - Wayne Cochran, 78, singer-songwriter
- November 22 – Tommy Keene, 59, singer-songwriter
- November 23 –
  - John Coates Jr., 79, jazz pianist
  - Jon Hendricks, 96, jazz singer
- November 24 – Mitch Margo, 70, singer-songwriter (The Tokens)
- November 27 – Robert Popwell, 66, jazz and rock bassist
- November 29 – Robert Walker, 80, blues guitarist
- November 30 – Jim Nabors, 87, actor and singer
- December 2 – Mundell Lowe, 95, guitarist
- December 8 – Gloria Ann Taylor, 73, soul singer
- December 12 – Pat DiNizio, 62, singer-songwriter and guitarist (The Smithereens)
- December 13
  - Dave Christenson, 54, singer (Stabilizers)
  - Willie Pickens, 86 jazz pianist
  - Warrel Dane, 56 heavy metal singer
- December 16
  - Ralph Carney, 61 Rock and jazz saxophonist and clarinetest
  - Richard Dobson, 75 country singer and songwriter
  - Keely Smith, 89 Jazz Singer
- December 17 – Kevin Mahogany, 59 jazz singer
- December 19
  - Jim Forrester, 43 American hard rock guitarist
  - Leo Welch, 85 American gospel blues singer and guitarist
- December 21
  - Roswell Rudd, 82 American jazz trombonist
  - Marylin Tyler, 91 American opera singer
- December 22 – Pam the Funkstress, American hip hop DJ
- December 28 – Curly Seckler, 98 American bluegrass guitarist and mandolinist

== See also ==
- 2010s in music
