= Capacity (song) =

Single by Charly Bliss

from the album Young Enough
- Released: February 6, 2019
- Recorded: 2018
- Genre: Synth-pop; power pop
- Length: 3:41
- Label: Barsuk
- Songwriters: Eva Hendricks; Sam Hendricks; Spencer Fox; Dan Shure
- Producer: Joe Chiccarelli

Charly Bliss singles chronology
"Heaven" (2018)	"Capacity" (2019)	"Chatroom" (2019)

"Capacity" is a song recorded by American rock band Charly Bliss. The song was released on February 6, 2019, through Barsuk Records, as the lead single from the band's second studio album, Young Enough (2019). The song was written by the entire band: vocalist/guitarist Eva Hendricks, drummer Sam Hendricks, guitarist Spencer Fox, and bassist Dan Shure. The song and accompanying album were produced by veteran engineer Joe Chiccarelli. Hendricks penned the song's lyrics as a self-critique of her own tendency to be accommodating.

"Capacity" was widely interpreted as an anthem exploring exhaustion and occupational burnout, and attracted positive notices from music critics. Its music video is set during a heist and was directed by Michelle Zauner of the band Japanese Breakfast.

== Background ==
Hendricks described the song as "about wanting to kill your inner people-pleaser." Expanding upon this concept in a later interview, she said, "I've always framed this song negatively, as in, it's about wanting to kill off this self-sacrificing part of my personality that I really despise, but if I frame it positively, it’s about learning to trust your gut [...] It is so cool and feels so good to say no!" The song went through many different iterations in its demo form, with each member of the band leaving an impression on its form, according to Hendricks. Musically, the song shifts the band's grungier, rock-oriented sound to a more synth-driven, pop approach.

The song's music video, directed by Michelle Zauner of the band Japanese Breakfast, depicts a heist gone awry. Zauner makes a cameo appearance as a "gonzo news reporter".

== Reception ==
"Capacity" was widely acclaimed by contemporary music critics. Steffanee Wang, writing for The Fader, said that the tune "blooms in its softness — a reminder that recovery can be as joyful and euphoric as self-destruction." Lindsay Zoladz, writing about the band in a profile for The Ringer, praised its lyrics as "biting and insightful," perceiving it as a "shot fired at the normalized exhaustion of late capitalism and the conditioning of 'triple-overtime ambition.'" Nina Corcoran of Pitchfork dubbed it an "antidote for the burnout generation." Rolling Stone's Jonathan Bernstein listed it among the magazine's "Songs You Need to Know", similarly referring to it as a "catchy, smart synth anthem for twentysomething burnouts." Joshua Bote of NPR interpreted it as "an anthem for emotional exhaustion at the hands of someone you deeply care for."
