= Forever (Charly Bliss album) =

Studio album by Charly Bliss
- Released: August 16, 2024
- Length: 36:49
- Label: Lucky Number Music
- Producer: Jake Luppen; Caleb Wright; Sam Hendricks

Charly Bliss chronology
Young Enough (2019)	Forever (2024)

Singles from Forever
- 1. "Nineteen" Released: May 1, 2024; 2. "Calling You Out" Released: May 30, 2024; 3. "Waiting for You" Released: July 9, 2024; 4. "Back There Now" Released: August 13, 2024

Forever is the third studio album of Brooklyn power pop group Charly Bliss, released on August 16, 2024 on the Lucky Number Music label. Forever is the band's first studio album since Young Enough, which was released in 2019.

== Background ==
Forever was produced by Jake Luppen (of the band Hippo Campus), Caleb Wright (who has worked with Samia), and the band's drummer Sam Hendricks.

Professional ratings
Aggregate scores
Source	Rating
AnyDecentMusic?	7.3/10
Metacritic	78/100
Review scores
Source	Rating
AllMusic	3.5/5 stars
And It Don't Stop	A
DIY	4/5 stars
Exclaim!	8/10
The Guardian	4/5 stars
Paste	6.2/10
Pitchfork	7.8/10
Rolling Stone	4/5 stars

== Track listing ==
No.	Title	Length
1.	"Tragic"	2:51
2.	"Calling You Out"	3:01
3.	"Back There Now"	3:30
4.	"Nineteen"	3:22
5.	"In Your Bed"	3:22
6.	"I'm Not Dead"	3:00
7.	"How Do You Do It"	3:02
8.	"I Don't Know Anything"	3:37
9.	"Here Comes the Darkness"	3:13
10.	"Waiting For You"	2:46
11.	"Easy to Love You"	2:42
12.	"Last First Kiss"	3:14
Total length:		36:49
