= The Takeover UK =

American rock group

The Takeover UK was an American rock group from Pittsburgh, Pennsylvania. Formed in mid-2004, the band released its first EP, It's All Happening in July 2008, and its first full-length album, Running With the Wasters, in March 2009, both for Rykodisc. The first single, "Ah La La," was featured on popular MTV reality show The Hills as well as in promotional commercials for ABC's Castle. The band has toured with The Juliana Theory, The Shys, and Army Navy. In Winter 2009 - 2010, the band toured their Running with the Wasters album.

== History ==
The members of The Takeover UK have been playing music for most of their lives. Snyder is the son of former Iron City Houserockers member, Gil Snyder. Solomich played in Disturbed Youth, A for Arson, and 53rd State as a youth growing up in Pittsburgh. Sickels was a member of various bands around the Pittsburgh area as well, sometimes fronting and sometimes taking over drum duty. White, the newest addition to the band, most recently fronted Derek White and the Monophobics, and has been a talented staple of the Pittsburgh music scene for sometime. Snyder, Sickels, and Shash were in school together growing up. Solomich and Sickels first met as youths, both being involved in different bands at the time. Both Solomich and Sickels continued to hone their craft over the years. From 2002 - 2004, Snyder and Sickles were playing in various bands together. On a trip home from college, Boston University, Solomich came to see one of Snyder and Sickles' shows. Shortly after this, the three decided to form a new project, The Takeover. Unfortunately, the name was already taken, so they added a UK to the end of the band name, thus forming "The Takeover UK."

As of November 2010, the band has been on hiatus for over a year.

As of March 2011, the band has split and members Snyder and Sickels have started a new band called 1,2,3. Solomich formed the band Junior Prom with Erik Ratensperger (formerly of The Virgins).

== Former members ==
- Nic Snyder - Guitar, Vocals
- Mark Solomich - Guitar, Vocals
- Derek White - Bass Guitar, Vocals
- Josh Sickels - Drums
- Adam Shash - Bass Guitar, Vocals (2004–2009)

== Discography ==
- It's All Happening EP (July 2008 - Rykodisc)
- Running With The Wasters (March 2009 - Rykodisc)

== In popular culture ==
Takeover UK appears in an episode of Jake and Amir on CollegeHumor.

Singers Mark Solomich and Nic Snyder appear briefly as extras in the 2008 film, The Mysteries of Pittsburgh, starring Nick Nolte, Sienna Miller and Peter Sarsgaard.
