= Young Enough =

Studio album by Charly Bliss
- Released: May 10, 2019
- Studios: Sunset Sound, Los Angeles; Brooklyn Recording, Brooklyn, New York
- Length: 38:54
- Label: Barsuk
- Producer: Joe Chiccarelli

Charly Bliss chronology
Guppy (2017)	Young Enough (2019)	Forever (2024)

Singles from Young Enough
- 1. "Capacity" Released: February 6, 2019; 2. "Chatroom" Released: March 6, 2019; 3. "Hard to Believe" Released: April 10, 2019

Young Enough is the second studio album of Brooklyn power pop group Charly Bliss, consisting of Eva Hendricks (vocals, guitar), Spencer Fox (vocals, guitar), Sam Hendricks (drums), and Dan Shure (vocals, bass).

The album's sound has drawn comparisons to No Doubt.

== Background ==
Young Enough is a more pop-focused album than its predecessor, and was inspired by Lorde's album Melodrama, as well as the music of the Cars and Carly Rae Jepsen. The album was produced by veteran producer Joe Chiccarelli, who has worked with U2, the Shins, and My Morning Jacket.

== Critical reception ==
Professional ratings
Aggregate scores
Source	Rating
AnyDecentMusic?	7.8/10
Metacritic	81/100
Review scores
Source	Rating
AllMusic	4/5 stars
Paste	8.2/10
Pitchfork	8.0/10
Rolling Stone	3.5/5 stars
Stereogum	positive
Vice (Expert Witness)	A−

Marcy Donelson at AllMusic gave the album four out of five stars, writing that "Ultimately, Young Enough outshines a promising debut, delivering a steady mix of summery earworms and angst." Jon Dolan of Rolling Stone called it "the mark of a band deepening the feelings of real personal struggle beneath the churning guitars and sheer melodies." At Pitchfork, reviewer Quinn Moreland gave the album an 8.0/10, writing that "It's also not uncommon for bands to lose their lyrical sincerity within a newfound over-produced sound. On Young Enough, Charly Bliss walk this thin line gracefully." Stereogum designated it their Album of the Week, with writer Tom Breihan, extolling the release as "sound[ing] the way major-label debuts used to sound [...] Charly Bliss have figured out how to make polished, hooky rock music that radiates energy and life, something of a lost art these days."

Ben Salmon at Paste said that "Young Enough introduces new moods and textures without tamping down the band’s irrepressible likeability."

== Track listing ==
No.	Title	Length
1.	"Blown to Bits"	3:37
2.	"Capacity"	3:41
3.	"Under You"	3:20
4.	"Camera"	3:11
5.	"Fighting in the Dark"	1:10
6.	"Young Enough"	5:19
7.	"Bleach"	3:51
8.	"Chatroom"	3:36
9.	"Hurt Me"	3:43
10.	"Hard to Believe"	3:46
11.	"The Truth"	3:41
Total length:		38:54

== Charts ==
Chart (2019)	Peak position
UK Independent Albums (Official Charts)	49
US Heatseekers Albums (Billboard)	4
US Independent Albums (Billboard)	21
US Top Album Sales (Billboard)	80
