= Little Image =

American alt-pop band

little image
- Origin: Dallas, Texas
- Genre: Alternative pop
- Years active: 2017–present
- Label: Hollywood
- Members: Jackson Simmons; Brandon Walters; Troy Bruner
- Website: littleimagemusic.com

Little Image (stylized as little image) are an American alternative pop band from Dallas, Texas. They released their major label debut, Self Titled, on Hollywood Records on May 12, 2023, after the independent release of Musings in 2017.

== History ==
Jackson Simmons, Brandon Walters and Troy Bruner met in high school in Dallas, where they formed the band. Simmons first conceived of the band when he attended a Battle of the Bands at The Curtain Club in Dallas. While in high school in 2017, they independently released their first album, Musings. They released their debut single, "Worth It," in 2020.

On January 20, 2023, the band announced the upcoming release of their album Self Titled. Their 2023 single "Out of My Mind" reached number 3 on the Billboard Alternative Airplay chart. On March 3, 2023, they released the single "Ballet." On May 12, 2023, the band released the album under Hollywood Records. It was produced by Chad Copelin, along with Jeremy Lutito. On July 12, 2024, the band released the single "Strange Friends," along with a music video by Sawyer Skipper.

In March 2026, they released the album Kill the Ghost on Hollywood Records, with the singles "The Pressure", "Run for Forever", "Novocaine", "Kill the Ghost", and "Real Estate". On July 10, 2026, they released the deluxe version of Kill the Ghost, featuring two new songs.

== Members ==
- Jackson Simmons (vocals, guitar)
- Brandon Walters (bass, synth)
- Troy Bruner (drums)

== Performances ==
In 2022, Little Image opened for Panic! at the Disco. From February through April 2023, they opened for indie rock band Colony House on a US tour. In August 2023, the band embarked on The Self Titled Tour, their first as headliners, with Levi Evans and Hastings as their opening acts. During 2025, the band opened for Almost Monday on their 20-city European tour starting March 1, 2025, Joywave on their Here to Perform... Tour starting on April 16, 2025., Bad Suns on their summer US tour, and The Academy Is... on their fall US tour starting on November 13, 2025. The band has also made appearances at Shaky Knees Music Festival, Float Fest, and Wonderbus Music & Arts Festival. The band embarked on their second headline tour, The Kill The Ghost Tour, playing 16 cities from May 6, 2026 to June 20, 2026. They will be supporting Young the Giant and Cold War Kids on tour in July and August 2026.

== Discography ==
=== Albums ===
Title	Album details
Musings	Released: August 11, 2017; Label: Self-released; Formats: LP, digital download
Self Titled	Released: May 12, 2023; Label: Hollywood Records; Formats: LP, digital download
Kill the Ghost	Released: March 27, 2026; Label: Hollywood Records; Formats: LP, digital download

=== Singles ===
List of singles, with showing year released, peak chart positions and album name
Title	Year	Peak chart positions	Album
Title	Year	US Alt.	Album
"Worth It"	2020	—	Self Titled
"Ego"	2021	—	Self Titled
"Lungs Burn"	2022	—	Self Titled
"Blue"	2022	—	Self Titled
"Out of My Mind"	2023	3	Self Titled
"Ballet"	2023	—	Self Titled
"Strange Friends"	2024	—	Non-album single
"The Pressure"	2025	—	Kill the Ghost
"Run for Forever"	2025	—	Kill the Ghost
"Novocaine"	2025	—	Kill the Ghost
"Kill the Ghost"	2025	34	Kill the Ghost
"Real Estate"	2026	—	Kill the Ghost
"Bottles (I Loved You)"	2026	—	Non-album single
"—" denotes a recording that did not chart or was not released in that territory.
