= Soulhat =

American rock band

Soulhat, in a publicity photo from 1994

Soulhat is an American rock band from Texas. The group formed in 1990 around the nucleus of Kevin McKinney, Bill Cassis, and Brian Walsh; Barry E. "Frosty" Smith, who had previously played drums with Lee Michaels and Funkadelic, joined soon after: at first playing percussion alongside, and eventually replacing original drummer Ian Bailey. Their self-released debut followed in 1993, and was reissued after they signed to Epic Records later that year. Their single "Bonecrusher" peaked at #25 on the Billboard Mainstream Rock charts. A follow-up studio album appeared in 1994, and a third in 2000.

In early 2003, Soulhat won the Austin Regional Poll in The 2nd Annual Independent Music Awards for their song "Flat Feet"

Barry "Frosty" Smith (born March 20, 1946, in Bellingham, Washington) died after a long illness on April 12, 2017, at the age of 71.

== Members ==
- Kevin McKinney - guitar, vocals
- Bill Cassis - guitar, vocals
- Brian Walsh - bass
- Barry E. Smith (a.k.a. Bartholomew Eugene Smith-Frost) - drums (died 2017)

== Discography ==
- Outdebox (Spindletop, 1992 & Epic Records, 1993)
- Live at the Black Cat Lounge (Currant, 1991)
- Good to Be Gone (Epic Records, 1994)
- Too Gone to be Good EP (Epic Records, 1994)
- Soulhat EP (SHAT Records, 1998)
- Experiment on a Flat Plane (Terminus Records, 2000)
- Live at the Black Cat Lounge (Dualtone, 2009)
