= Charly Bliss =

Power pop band from New York City

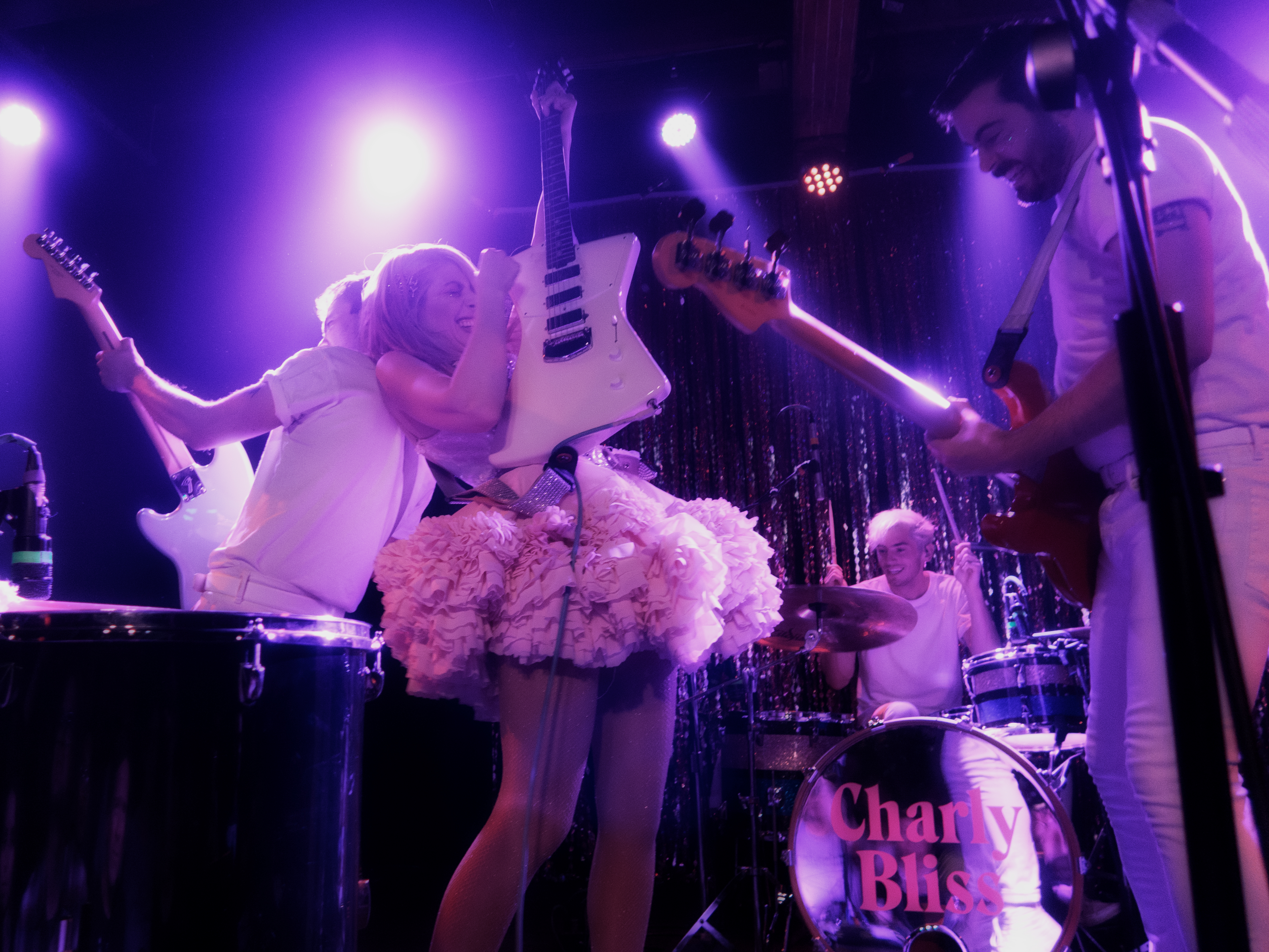
- (L–R): Spencer Fox, Eva Hendricks, Sam Hendricks, and Dan Shure performing in June 2019

Background information
- Origin: Brooklyn, New York, United States
- Genres: Power pop, indie rock, pop punk, grunge-pop
- Years active: 2011–present
- Labels: Barsuk Records, Lucky Number Music
- Members: Eva Hendricks; Spencer Fox; Sam Hendricks; Dan Shure
- Website: charlybliss.com

Charly Bliss is an American power pop band from Brooklyn, New York, who formed in 2011. The band's line-up is composed of siblings Eva (lead vocals, guitar) and Sam (drums) Hendricks, lead guitarist Spencer Fox, and bassist Dan Shure. To date, the band have released three studio albums, Guppy (2017), Young Enough (2019), and Forever (2024).

The music of Charly Bliss has been described as "bubblegrunge", a portmanteau of bubblegum pop and grunge music. Of Guppy, Pitchfork wrote that the band "hone in on [sic] an era from about 20 years ago, when seemingly every other band came blissed out, drenched in sun, and outfitted for a spot on the 10 Things I Hate About You or Jawbreaker soundtrack next to Veruca Salt."

== History ==
=== 2011-2015: EP, A Lot to Say EP, and Soft Serve EP ===
Eva and Sam Hendricks grew up in Westport, Connecticut, the children of devoted music fans. Eva first developed her interests in musical theater and also sang jingles for local commercials. She first met Spencer Fox, a former child actor who voiced Dash Parr in the 2004 film The Incredibles, outside of a Tokyo Police Club show at New York's Webster Hall. Fox moved to Westport midway through his junior year of high school and began collaborating with Eva on songs. Their earliest recordings, more acoustic, folk-based, and recorded in her bedroom, were posted to YouTube. Eva planned to go to New York University (NYU)'s Clive Davis Institute of Recorded Music post-graduation, and wanted to have a finished product to enter the program with. She and Fox recorded an extended play under the Charly Bliss name, simply titled EP, which posted to Bandcamp in 2011.

Their first tour was a six-month stint across Connecticut that was sparsely attended by friends and "a few drunk townies". Eva went on to attend NYU, while Fox attended the State University of New York at Purchase, and Sam Hendricks diverged to attend Ohio's Miami University.

Their second EP, A Lot to Say, was released in 2013. The first iteration of Charly Bliss included bassist Kevin Copeland, who eventually left to pursue other interests. They toured consistently, opening for bands such as Sleater-Kinney, Wolf Parade, and Veruca Salt.

In June 2014, they released the EP Soft Serve, which included a three-part video series as well as a comic book trilogy. After Copeland's exit, the band recruited Dan Shure on bass. He and Fox had met at theater camp as children and were longtime friends. At that time, Shure was directing off-Broadway productions but was an early fan of the band and did not want to miss the opportunity to join.

=== 2015–2018: Guppy ===
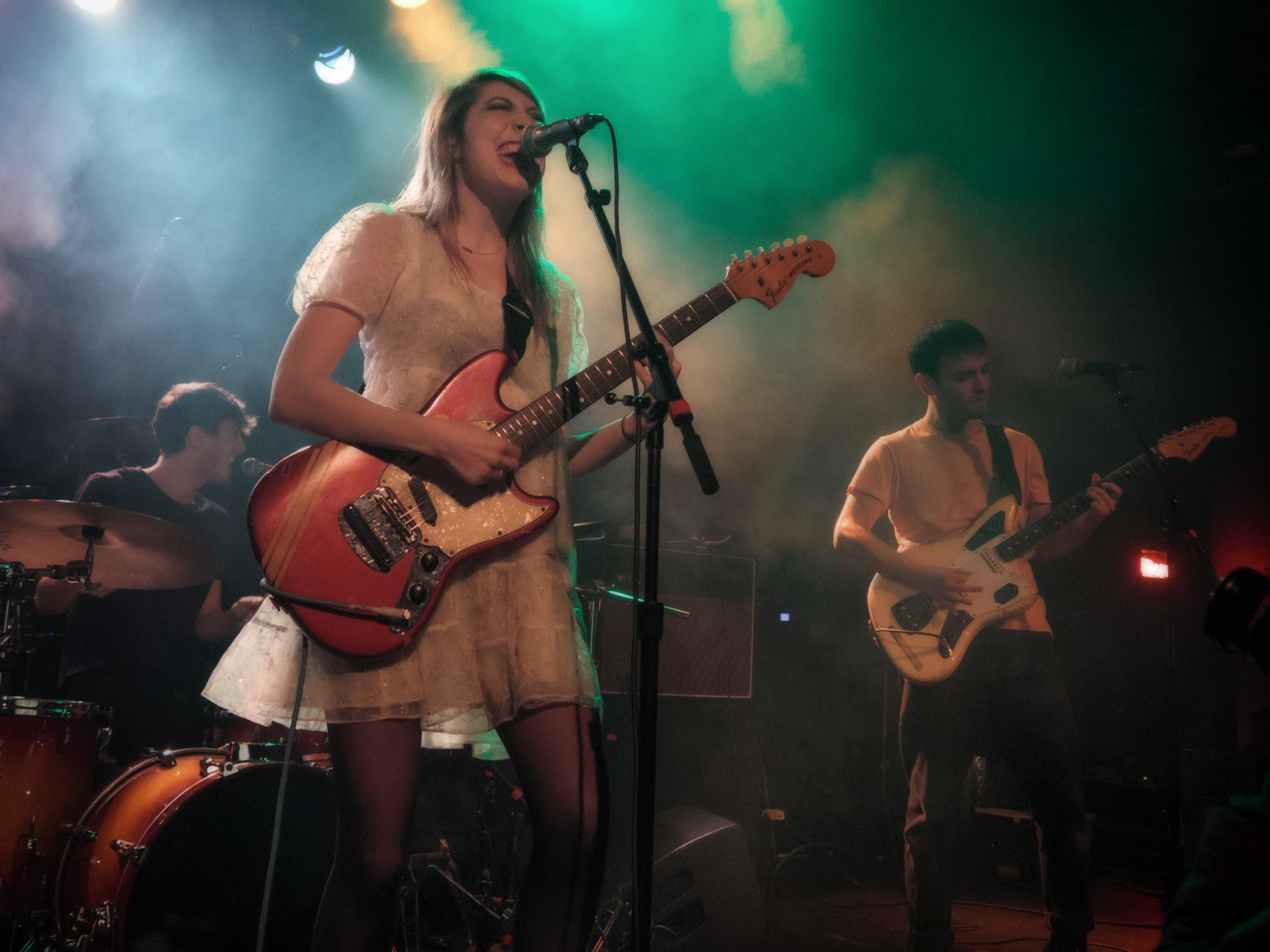
Charly Bliss performing in 2018

Charly Bliss began recording their debut album, Guppy, in 2015, but shelved the first result, feeling as though it did not sound like them. "We were really highlighting the aspects of our sound that make us a garage band, or a punk band," Eva remarked in a later interview. But the group came around to the fact that each member favored pop music above all, and they re-recorded Guppy with this renewed focus in mind.

Guppy was released on Barsuk Records in April 2017 to rave reviews from music critics. Following its release, the band went on tour across the U.S., and made their first-ever tour of the United Kingdom as well. In 2018, they opened for Death Cab for Cutie, and released the single "Heaven".

=== 2019-2023: Young Enough and Supermoon EP ===
On February 6, 2019, Charly Bliss released the single "Capacity" and announced their second studio album Young Enough, which released on May 10, 2019. They recorded the album with veteran producer Joe Chiccarelli, who has also worked with U2, the Shins, and My Morning Jacket. To commemorate the release, the band launched a 24 hour livestream on their youtube channel called CBTV, which included a full stream of the album, behind the scenes footage, and Charly Bliss-themed spoofs of TV shows, such as MTV Cribs.

On October 30, 2019, the band released Supermoon, an EP with five songs, recorded during the same sessions that produced Young Enough. In 2020, the group contributed a cover of the song "Pretend to Be Nice" from the Josie and the Pussycats soundtrack for Saving for a Custom Van, a tribute compilation celebrating the life of musician Adam Schlesinger.

=== 2024-present: Forever ===
On August 16, 2024, Charly Bliss released its third studio album Forever, the band's first since 2019.

== Musical style and influences ==
Charly Bliss' music has been frequently compared to Weezer. "Weezer was our touchstone for such a long time," Eva Hendricks admitted in an interview in 2019. The band have also been inspired by the Killers (frequently covering "Mr. Brightside" on their Young Enough tour), Cibo Matto, the All-American Rejects, Fountains of Wayne and Kate Bush.

In an interview with Junkee, Eva Hendricks elaborated on the impact that new wave and the CBGB's music scene had on both her and her bandmates. "Growing up, our parents always had on records by Blondie, Talking Heads, David Bowie... a lot of that kind of music. I don't think we really appreciated all of it until we were a bit older — especially Talking Heads. By the time Spencer and I were teenagers, we were obsessed with them. I'm pretty sure every paper I ever wrote when I was in college was about David Byrne in one way or another." In the same interview, Hendricks also noted the influence of Lorde and her album Melodrama on the writing of the Young Enough album. "It's a perfect pop record, but it's a pop record that sounds like nothing else on the market," she said. "We were really inspired by that. The songwriting, the production... it's all in this very singular universe. Lyrically, too, it felt like she was so unafraid to say everything. The embarrassing things, the hard things... she dug as deep as she possibly could. They're such beautiful words."

== Members ==
Current members

- Eva Hendricks – lead vocals, rhythm guitar, synthesizer, additional percussion (2011–present)
- Sam Hendricks – drums, percussion, backing vocals (2011–present)
- Spencer Fox – lead guitar, backing vocals, synthesizer (2011–present)
- Dan Shure – bass guitar, backing vocals, bass synthesizer, rhythm guitar (2014–present)

Former members

- Kevin Copeland – bass guitar (2011–2014)

== Discography ==
=== Studio albums ===
Title	Album details	Peak chart positions		
Title	Album details	US Current	US Indie	UK Indie
Guppy	Released: April 21, 2017; Label: Barsuk	—	—	—
Young Enough	Released: May 10, 2019; Label: Barsuk	80	21	49
Forever	Released: August 16, 2024; Label: Lucky Number	—	—	47
"—" denotes releases that did not chart.

=== Extended plays ===
Title	Album details
Soft Serve EP	Released: June 7, 2014; Label: Self-Released; Recorded with Philadelphia-based producer, Kyle “Slic'k” Johnson (Modest Mouse, The Hives)
Audiotree Live	Released: October 30, 2019; Label: Audiotree Music
Supermoon	Released: October 30, 2019; Label: Barsuk

=== Singles ===
List of singles, showing year released and album name
Title	Year	Album
"Clean"	2013	Non-album singles
"Ruby"	2016	Non-album singles
"Turd"	2016	Non-album singles
"Glitter"	2017	Guppy
"Westermarck"	2017	Guppy
"Scare U"	2017	Guppy
"Heaven"	2018	Non-album single
"Capacity"	2019	Young Enough
"Chatroom"	2019	Young Enough
"Hard to Believe"	2019	Young Enough
"Young Enough"	2019	Young Enough
"It's Christmas and I Fucking Miss You" (with PUP)	2020	Non-album singles
"You Don't Even Know Me Anymore"	2023	Non-album singles
"I Need a New Boyfriend"	2023	Non-album singles
"Nineteen"	2024	Forever
"Calling You Out"	2024	Forever
"Waiting for You"	2024	Forever
"Back There Now"	2024	Forever

==== Promotional singles ====
List of singles, showing year released and album name
Title	Year	Album
"All I Want for Christmas Is You"	2017	Non-album single
