= Invidia (band) =

American heavy metal band

- Origin: Las Vegas, Nevada, U.S.
- Genres: Nu metal
- Years active: 2016–present
- Members: Brian Jackson; Matt Snell; Marcos Medina Rivera; Darren Badorine; Evan Seidlitz
- Past members: Chris Hamilton; Travis Johnson
- Website: Invidia on Facebook

Invidia is an American heavy metal band from Las Vegas, Nevada, consisting of Brian Jackson formerly of Skinlab on lead guitar, Matt Snell formerly of Five Finger Death Punch on bass, Marcos Medina Rivera formerly of Skinlab on rhythm guitar, Darren Badorine of Six Ounce Gloves on drums, and Evan Seidlitz formerly of Thrown into Exile, Grimace, and Vyces on lead vocals.

== History ==
The band started when Travis Johnson created a post on the internet, at which time Brian Jackson contacted him, stating that he would be happy to work with him. In 2017, the ensemble released their debut studio album, As the Sun Sleeps with music producer and Once Human guitarist Logan Mader.

== Members ==
=== Current members ===
- Brian Jackson – lead guitar, backing vocals (2015–present)
- Matt Snell – bass, backing vocals (2015–present)
- Marcos Medina Rivera – rhythm guitar, backing vocals (2016–present)
- Darren Badorine – drums (2016–present)
- Evan Seidlitz – lead vocals (2017–present)

=== Former members ===
- Travis Johnson – lead vocals (2015–2017)
- Chris Hamilton – drums (2015)

== Discography ==
- As the Sun Sleeps (2017)

=== Singles ===
- "Making My Amends" (2016)
- "Feed the Fire" (2017)
