= Guppy (album) =

Studio album by Charly Bliss
- Released: April 21, 2017
- Recorded: Early 2016
- Studios: Atomic Sound, New York City; Fancy Time Studio, Philadelphia
- Genres: Bubblegrunge; power pop; pop punk; garage rock; glam rock; college rock
- Length: 29:26
- Label: Barsuk
- Producer: Kyle "Slick" Johnson

Charly Bliss chronology
Soft Serve (2014)	Guppy (2017)	Young Enough (2019)

Singles from Guppy
- 1. "Ruby" Released: May 16, 2016; 2. "Glitter" Released: February 7, 2017; 3. "Percolator" Released: March 2, 2017; 4. "Black Hole" Released: April 5, 2017

Guppy is the debut album by Brooklyn power pop group Charly Bliss, consisting of Eva Hendricks (vocals, guitar), Spencer Fox (vocals, guitar), Sam Hendricks (drums), and Dan Shure (vocals, bass). The group wrote it over the course of four years and recorded two versions of it: one tracked in 2015, which they rejected because it was not "fun", and a more pop-infused version recorded in early 2016 that was released by Barsuk Records in April 2017. The album contains a harsh 1990s-esque alternative rock sound with lyrics that deal with emotional vulnerability.

Guppy was promoted with six campy, Andrew Costa-directed music videos and a 16-page limited edition comic book based on the album. Critics gave it glowing reviews upon its release, praising its lyrics and unique musical style. The album was in the top ten of several year-end lists by publications such as Newsweek, ABC News, PopMatters, Stereogum, The Ringer, and Billboard, and landed at number 42 on The Village Voice's annual Pazz & Jop poll.

== Production and composition ==
All of the songs for Guppy were written over the course of four years. Charly Bliss recorded the first version of the album in early 2015, a month after Shure joined the group, and it was produced and engineered by Justin Pizzoferrato. However, the band disliked it as not being "fun" and it was not released. Sam Hendricks reasoned, "It never really seemed like we quite fit in with a sub-scene within the larger New York scene. I think we were kind of horrified to feel like we didn't fit in."

Charly Bliss then did lots of touring, which gave them a better idea on how to record the album. Shure explained, "When we first recorded it, we were like, 'We want to make a good indie record.' But once we started seeing the response we were getting at shows, we were like 'No. We want our first album to be as strong as possible.'" The band was going for an indie rock style when recording the LP's first version, but later realized they had to follow the tendencies of pop music to make an enjoyable album. Thus, they followed that plan when recording the version of Guppy that was officially released.

Guppy was recorded in early 2016 and produced by Kyle "Slick" Johnson, who worked on the band's debut extended play Soft Serve (2014), instead of Pizzoferrato. In an interview published on August 2, 2016, the band announced they were around 90% finished with the LP. Fox stated that in making the record, instead of just rushing out the songs in a fashion of most indie rock music, he arranged and produced the tracks that would naturally appeal to most listeners or "fulfill our idea of what a good song should be." As Eva Hendricks described the intentions of the LP, "We wanted this recording to sound as fun as our live show, but also different from our live show. We've learned a lot from looking to bands that are more poppy. Like, Is this as catchy or concise as it can be? Is this a banger?"

Featuring a 1990s alternative rock sound, Guppy musically consists of "day-glo pop-punk guitars" and "endless-rainbow [pop] hooks", as with the works of Circle Jerks, Germs, Fall Out Boy, My Chemical Romance, Blink-182, and Weezer Charly Bliss was inspired by, wrote J. Edward Keyes of Bandcamp Daily. Eva's childlike singing style on the album was inspired by Kay Hanley: "I love Kay Hanley, and it is my dream of all dreams to meet her." The bright tone of her vocals juxtaposes the harsh-sounding instrumentals, which led a Hyperallergic writer to categorize the album as "Grimes singing for Roomrunner."

== Lyrics ==
Eva Hendricks wrote the lyrics in her bedroom, "the only place where I'm comfortable enough to try new ideas that I'd normally feel self-conscious about." Guppy deals with emotional vulnerability. Despite the LP's joyous tone, Hendricks explained that the lyrics involve "taking all those things people have said about me and spitting them back out and saying, 'Fuck you.'" In "trying to make fun of this teeny-bopper way I have of talking", she wrote the songs as "extensions" of herself, "me, with the saturation turned up all the way." She elaborated, "I'm either flipping out happy, off the walls, and stoked, or miserable, freaking out, super neurotic, and anxious. The record sounds like that, like me careening between those extremes in my personality." The LP explores the "injustices of girlhood through everything from a sour date ("Am I the best, or just the first to say yes?") to the death of a lover's dog ("does he love me most now that his dog is toast?")", wrote Tatiana Cirisano. "Ruby" is a tribute to Eva Hendricks' therapist. It was inspired by an event one week before writing the song, when she discussed with her therapist about how little time her brother Sam Hendricks gave her to write lyrics.

== Cover art ==
The cover art of Guppy is a photograph of five goldfish the band purchased at a pet store, taken by Jacqueline Harriet and Mark T. Davis. It was taken two days before cover art for the album was due to be submitted to Barsuk Records. The first planned cover artwork was not used due to it being copyrighted by the Los Angeles Times.

== Music videos ==
Guppy was promoted with several music videos that "veer towards that kind of campy, fun feeling", explained Eva. All of them were directed by Andrew Costa, Eva Hendricks co-directing the videos for "DQ" and "Scare U." The music video for "Ruby" was released on May 16, 2016 via The A.V. Club. The video was influenced by public-access television shows such as Kelly & Company show. As Eva summarized, the video takes place in a "bizarre, pastel, Midwestern world" with zombies. Friends of members from the band portrayed zombie extras in the video. On March 2, 2017. The Fader premiered "Percolator"'s video, which depicts the group members as superheroes fighting "an undisclosed evil." The music video for "Black Hole", which Nylon magazine's official site issued on April 5, 2017, is a spoof of the film Matilda (1996) and also features cousins of the band's members.

Billboard magazine's official website premiered "Westermarck"'s video on June 13, 2017. Described by the magazine as "like Camp Rock minus the Jonas Brothers", the video was filmed as a summer camp in western Massachusetts Eva used to go to as a child and features three of the camp's employees. On August 29, 2017, Noisey premiered the video for "DQ." Filmed in Westport, Connecticut homes owned by parents of the band, the video involves being in several teen movie-esque scenarios such as a pool party. On October 13, 2017, the website of W premiered the official video for "Scare U." Inspired by the Buffy the Vampire Slayer episode "Doublemeat Palace", the video stars Eva as a trainee at a restaurant who investigates why its capturing and transforming its customers into hamburgers.

== Comic book ==
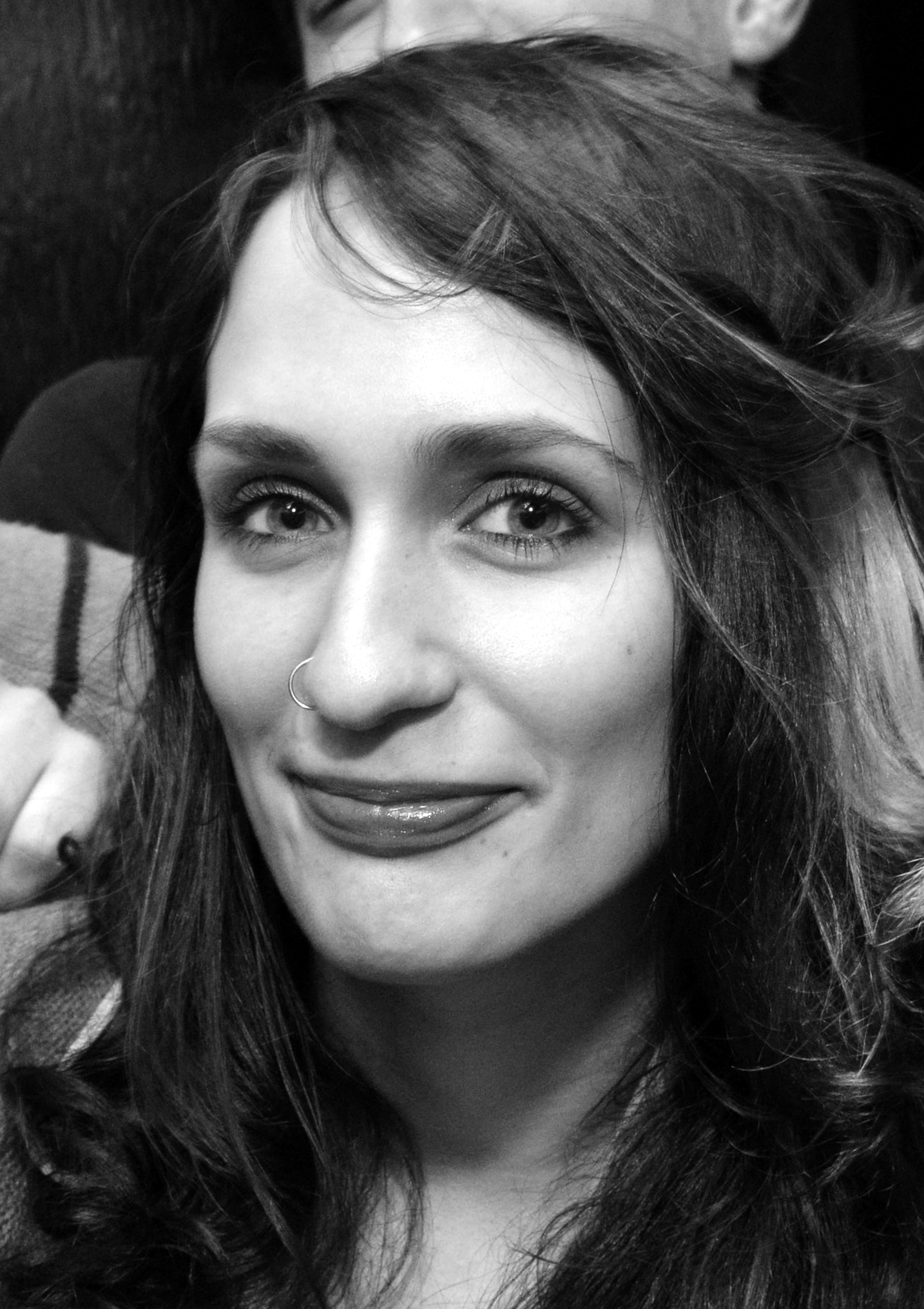
Sadie Dupuis contributed artwork for a companion piece comic book of Guppy.

On October 20, 2017, Guppy: Issue One, a 16-page comic and companion piece for songs from Guppy, was released and sold for a limited edition of 500 copies. It features art from Sadie Dupuis and Michael DeForge, with Noah Van Sciver creating the cover art. Copies of the comic also came with a flexi-disc consisting of two previously unreleased Charly Bliss songs, "Golden Age" and "Special."

== Critical reception ==
Professional ratings
Aggregate scores
Source	Rating
Album of the Year	82/100
AnyDecentMusic?	7.9/10
Metacritic	87/100
Review scores
Source	Rating
AllMusic	3.5/5 stars
The A.V. Club	A
Consequence of Sound	B+
Exclaim!	8/10
Flood Magazine	8/10
Knoxville News Sentinel	4/5
Pitchfork	7.8/10
PopMatters	9/10 stars
Punknews.org	3.5/5 stars
Spectrum Culture	4/5 stars

Nashville Scene labeled Guppy as "one of the best pop records of the year, rightfully drawing comparisons to Veruca Salt, The Rentals, Weezer and other acts whose pop songcraft has proven to age well as decades pass." Cirisano described the album as "both devastatingly honest and surprisingly funny -- a tough combination to nail, but one which would make 1994 Rivers Cuomo proud here." Pitchfork claimed the band achieved a "deceptively hard balance" with Guppy, reasoning that it "works on multiple levels: as tossed-off sarcasm, as a statement of pride, and, crucially, as an undeniable pop [album]." AllMusic stated, "Guppy may be just the ticket for those looking for a reprieve from the ubiquitous gloss of electro-pop, and they can have it without sacrificing catchiness or sunny vibrations."

The A.V. Club's Alex McLevy labeled Guppy a "nearly flawless exemplar of its kind" and "the sound of rock music doing the timeless job it only achieves from its best practitioners." He praised the LP for being "wholly adrift and disposable by any metric of serious analysis," and an Exclaim! writer similarly called it a "clever exercise in repositioning of boring genre rules", though he disliked the lack of a specific genre resulted in "occasional cognitive inconsistency." PopMatters critic Brian Duricy called it "a special release. It has powers: the power to transport you back to some of your most formative experiences, but also the power to let you know that you're nowhere near done having them yet. That the best happened, and the best is yet to come." He opined that the LP "tap[s] into such adrenaline-inducing melodies with meaningful lyrics to match," a combination very few albums have. Spectrum Culture claims the album has "a sort of magic that neither one could achieve on their own."

Multiple reviewers highlighted the aggressive and depth-filled nature of Eva's lyrics. Duricy wrote, "Eva Hendricks has that rare quality of knowing what her voice is in both the written and spoken forms, and this marriage usually only is forged through decades of experience." Knoxville News Sentinel stated, "She's the ultimate passive-aggressive imp, sending manipulative side-eye disguised as vulnerability." McLevy wrote that the band "speaks to the uncertain core of each of us, doling out the screams and hollers of inner upheaval the rest of us lack the artistry to express in such passionate and expressive ways." A writer for Earbuddy stated the lyrics have a "killer sense of humor, which only makes Guppy's songs that more infectious." Dylan Gallimore praised Eva's singing on the album: "[she] makes it clear that she possesses subterranean, super-human talent, and, especially on the latter half of the record, she showcases her range, depth and raw vocal prowess." Punknews.org favorably reviewed the album, but also stated "a little more anger and roughing up" was need for the music to fully work. Writing for Backstage Pass, Jordan Gibbs offered, singer Eva "Hendricks backed by the controlled ferocity of the band presents a vulnerability so intense it that it doubles as a strength."

== Accolades ==
=== Semester-end lists ===
Publication	Accolade	Rank	Ref.
The Alternative	The 50 Best Albums So Far in 2017	*	
The A.V. Club	The Best Albums of 2017 So Far	*	
Consequence of Sound	Top 25 Albums of 2017 (So Far)	22	
Spin	50 Best Albums of 2017 So Far	39	
Stereogum	50 Best Albums of 2017 So Far	3	
"*" indicates an unordered list.

=== Year-end lists ===
In The Village Voice's Pazz & Jop, an poll regarding the best albums of the year as voted by more than 400 American music critics, Guppy ranked number 42 with 178 points.

Publication	Accolade	Rank	Ref.
ABC News	50 Best Albums of 2017	6	
The Alternative	Top 50 Albums of 2017	4	
The A.V. Club	20 Best Albums of 2017	16	
Bandcamp Daily	The Best Albums of 2017	5	
Billboard	Best Albums of 2017	38	
Billboard	25 Best Rock Albums of 2017	7	
Newsweek	The 17 Best Albums of 2017	2	
Noisey	The 100 Best Albums of 2017	46	
PopMatters	The 60 Best Albums of 2017	55	
PopMatters	The Best Indie Rock of 2017	6	
The Ringer	Best Albums of 2017	9	
Stereogum	The 50 Best Albums of 2017	7	
Uproxx	50 Best Albums of 2017	23	
The Village Voice	Pazz & Jop	42	

== Track listing ==
Track lengths derived from the iTunes Store.

No.	Title	Length
1.	"Percolator"	2:46
2.	"Westermarck"	3:12
3.	"Glitter"	3:14
4.	"Black Hole"	3:02
5.	"Scare U"	2:25
6.	"Ruby"	2:11
7.	"DQ"	3:19
8.	"Gatorade"	2:19
9.	"Totalizer"	2:33
10.	"Julia"	4:25
Total length:		29:26

== Personnel ==
- Written and performed by Charly Bliss (Dan Shure, Eva Hendricks, Sam Hendricks, and Spencer Fox)
- Lyrics by Hendricks
- Arrangements by Fox
- Recorded, produced, engineered, and mixed by Kyle "Slick" Johnson at Atomic Sound in New York City and Fancy Time Studio in Philadelphia
- Mastered by Joe LaPorta at Sterling Sound in New York City
- Artwork photography by Jacqueline Harriet and Mark T. Davis

== Release history ==
Region	Date	Format(s)	Label
Worldwide	April 13, 2017	Streaming	NPR Music
Worldwide	April 21, 2017	CD; digital download; vinyl	Barsuk
