= Dry Cell (band) =

American metal band

- Origin: Los Angeles, California, U.S.
- Genres: Nu metal; alternative metal
- Years active: 1998–2005; 2008–2010
- Labels: Beyond Control; Warner Bros.; Reprise; Epic; Hollywood
- Past members: Jeff Gutt; Danny Hartwell; Judd Gruenbaum; Brandon Brown; Dave Wasierski

Dry Cell was an American nu metal band formed in 1998 in California, known in earlier stages as Impúr. They are best known for their song "Body Crumbles", which was featured in numerous third party media, such as the Queen of the Damned soundtrack and Madden NFL 2003. They're also known for the song "Slip Away" which was featured in Freekstyle. The band released one studio album, Disconnected, in 2002.

== History ==
=== Early years (1998–2001) ===
Guitarist Danny Hartwell and drummer Brandon Brown met in 1998 at a Ratt Show on the Sunset Strip. The pair later added bassist Judd Gruenbaum and began playing under the name Beyond Control.

Beyond Control soon earned the attention of Warner Brothers A&R executive Jeff Blue, responsible for discovering Linkin Park. Blue signed the band to a development deal, found a new lead singer in Jeff Gutt from Detroit and renamed the group Impúr.

Blue described the band as "Like Metallica meets Incubus meets Linkin Park but heavier. No DJing, no rapping, very melodic and the kids are just phenomenal musicians".

While known as Impúr the song Body Crumbles was featured on Rob Zombie's sampler disc Calling All Maniacs which circulated with his 2001 release titled The Sinister Urge.

=== Disconnected (2002–2003) ===
The Disconnected album jewel case

After being signed to Warner Bros. Records, the band went to work recording their debut album titled Disconnected. The 12-track album was due to be released on July 16, 2002. It was later pushed back to August 27, 2002. In the end, one of the band members' father got into a heated argument with Blue regarding the size of the band's promotion budget, the result of months of behind-the-scenes disagreement. Within 48 hours the father took his complaints to Warner, and two days later they released Dry Cell from their contract.

The only place Disconnected was ever sold at (albeit in limited quantities) was during the Locobazooka Festival in 2002. These were the final Warner pressed copies complete with artwork. However, advanced copies of the album which come in a paper sleeve cover and contain different artwork, can be found more regularly. However, one song from the album, "Body Crumbles", could be found in other places, such as; the Queen of the Damned soundtrack, as part of the Madden NFL 2003 soundtrack and on the Hard Mix 2002 promo CD. That same year, the band's cover version of the Stone Temple Pilots song "Heaven & Hot Rods" was used on the NASCAR on Fox and the Crank It Up soundtrack, "Slip Away" appeared in the EA Sports BIG franchise video game Freekstyle and the song "So Long Ago" is on the soundtrack for Warren Miller's Storm.

The band always stated there was no chance of releasing the album, even if they were to sign a new record deal. In 2008, it was announced that the band would be releasing Disconnected sometime after September of the same year. It was eventually released in 2009 on iTunes.

In October 2002, Dry Cell was featured in an article in The New York Times regarding their brief stint with Warner Bros.

=== After Warner Brothers (2003–2005) ===
In March 2003, it was reported that a deal had signed with Epic Records. However, nothing ever became of this contract.

In early 2004, Dave Wasierski was named as the band's new vocalist. At the time, it was reported that 8 new songs had been completed.

In 2005, vocalist Jeff Gutt re-joined the band, and they recorded four new demo tracks. The two songs released to the public were titled "New Revolution" and "The Lie". In late 2005, Danny Hartwell left the band. The group subsequently disbanded. After their split, two other tracks titled "Into Oblivion" and "Find a Way" were made available for download via their MySpace page.

=== Reunion and second break-up (2007–2010) ===
In 2007, the band stated that:

Dry Cell back by popular demand! Contacted by legendary A&R producer to reunite in late 2007 the band is currently working together on four new demos for Jeff Blue, and is gearing up for their release of their Disconnected record. Dry Cell will be starting to write music for their next record on July 13. New record to be released In early summer of '09. Disconnected record is to be released after September of this year the moment we get confirmation of the date we will post it here. Get the word out- log on and chat with band members!

In February 2008, bassist Judd Gruenbaum noted on the band's MySpace that they had gotten back together for guitarist Danny Hartwell's birthday party at The Roxy on Sunset strip. They were also recording new music according to Gruenbaum. Sometime afterwards, Dry Cell updated their MySpace page stating they were halfway finished with recording a brand new album according, to Danny Hartwell in this message, "About half of it is done the rest is coming soon so its all good there should be some new posts of it up online in the near future keep it real..."

On December 15, 2009, Dry Cell announced through a comment left on their MySpace, that they released two full-length records on iTunes, saying that one was of old songs (assumed to be Disconnected), and one was of new songs. But the songs were not found on iTunes for several days. A few days later, the Disconnected album (advance version) appeared on iTunes, with alternate cover art.

Later in January 2010, the second album appeared on iTunes with the title The Dry Cell Collection, which included mostly previously released material and several more. Four songs on the record had been on the band's MySpace months before the release.

Since early 2010, there were no updates/news from the band. In 2012, it was revealed that Jeff Gutt has left the band in 2009 for good and the band is now defunct. After his departure, Gutt competed on The X Factor in 2012 and 2013 (he eliminated on "Boot Camp" and as runner-up, respectively), and later Gutt became as lead vocalist of Stone Temple Pilots since 2017.

== Members ==
- Danny Hartwell – lead guitar (1998–2005, 2007–2010)
- Judd Gruenbaum – bass, lead and backing vocals (1998–2005, 2007–2010)
- Brandon Brown – drums, percussion (1998–2005, 2007–2010)
- Jeff Gutt – lead vocals, rhythm guitar (2000–2004, 2005, 2007–2009)
- Dave Wasierski – lead vocals (2004–2005)

Timeline

== Discography ==
=== Albums ===
Album information
Disconnected
- Recorded: 2002
- Released: December 2009 (digital only)
- Label: Warner Bros. Records/Hollywood Riviera/Beyond Control Records
- Singles: Body Crumbles
The Dry Cell Collection
- Recorded: 2002–2005 and 2008
- Released: January 8, 2010 on iTunes
- Label: Hollywood Riviera/Beyond Control Records

=== Disconnected (Album Advance) ===
==== Advance/iTunes ====
1. "Slip Away" – 3:58
2. "Under the Sun" – 3:32
3. "Body Crumbles" – 3:05
4. "Last Time" – 3:12
5. "Sorry" – 3:33
6. "Silence" – 3:11
7. "So Long Ago" – 3:44
8. "Forever Beautiful" – 2:49
9. "Disconnected" – 2:48
10. "Ordinary" – 4:20
11. "Brave" – 3:00
12. "Last Time (Reprise)" – 3:12

==== Jewel Case version ====
1. "Slip Away" – 4:15
2. "Under the Sun" – 3:33
3. "So Long Ago" – 3:47
4. "Forever Beautiful" – 2:53
5. "Ordinary" – 4:37
6. "Last Time" – 3:37
7. "Brave" – 3:03
8. "Disconnected" – 2:50
9. "Sick" – 3:14
10. "Silence" – 3:16
11. "Body Crumbles" – 3:13
12. "Sorry" – 3:34
13. "I Confide" – 2:58
14. "Body Crumbles (Humble Brothers Remix)" – 3:21

=== The Dry Cell Collection ===
1. "The Lie" – 3:31 (previously released as "The Lie (Rock Version)" on demo sampler 2008)
2. "I Deny" – 3:29
3. "Affliction" – 3:07
4. "Find a Way" – 3:39
5. "New Revolution" – 3:50
6. "Into Oblivion" – 3:52
7. "Living for Nothing" – 3:35 (previously released as "Grape Jelly" on demo sampler 2003)
8. "Velvet Elvis" – 3:02
9. "Sick" (demo version) – 3:12
10. "Body Crumbles Remix" – 3:24
11. "So Alive" – 3:21
12. "Tragedy" – 3:37 (previously released as "Tragedy Pass" on demo sampler 2008)

=== Impür - Demo EP 2001 ===
1. ”Body Crumblez”
2. ”I Confide (Over and Over)
3. ”Brave”
4. ”Slip Away”
5. ”Ordinary”

=== 2001 - 3 Song Demo ===
1. ”Body Crumblez”
2. ”Brave”
3. ”Slip Away”

=== 2002 Sampler Freekstyle ===
1. ”Body Crumbles (Rough Mix)”
2. ”Slip Away (Rough Mix)”
3. ”Body Crumbles (Humble Brothers Freekstyle Remix)”

=== 2002 Sampler ===
1. ”Body Crumbles”
2. ”Slip Away”
3. ”Body Crumbles (Remix)”
4. ”Sorry”

2002 Sampler

1. Body Crumbles
2. Brave
3. Slip Away

=== 2003 Sampler ===
1. "Living for Nothing / Grape Jelly"
2. "I Regret / PeeWee"
3. "The Way You Abuse Me / Velvet Elvis"

All songs were given two titles: the first title using lyrics from the song, and the second were the primarily used titles.

=== 2005 Sampler ===
1. "Find a Way"
2. "New Revolution"
3. "Into Oblivion"
4. "The Lie"

=== 2008 Sampler ===
1. "Affliction"
2. "I Deny"
3. "The Lie (Rock Version)"
4. "Tragedy Pass"

=== Non-album songs ===
- "Heaven & Hot Rods (Stone Temple Pilots cover)" – was released on NASCAR: Crank It Up
- "Understand Me (Demo 2000)" – was released on 10th Annual Los Angeles Music Awards 2000 Sonic Sampler
- "I Confide" – BSide from the Disconnected Advance, mixed differently from the jewel case version
- "Sick" – BSide from the Disconnected Advance, mixed differently from the jewel case version
- "Sick (Clean Edit)" – BSide from the Disconnected Advance, which was a censored version of the song
