= In Droves =

Studio album by Black Map
- Released: March 10, 2017
- Genre: Hard rock, alternative rock
- Label: eOne Music, SPV
- Producer: Aaron Helllam

Black Map chronology
...And We Explode (2014)	In Droves (2017)	Melodoria (2022)

In Droves is the second studio album by alternative metal band Black Map, released on March 10, 2017.

== Track listing ==
No.	Title	Length
1.	"Transit I"	0:27
2.	"Run Rabbit Run"	3:21
3.	"Foxglove"	3:26
4.	"Ruin"	3:21
5.	"Heavy Waves"	3:16
6.	"Dead Ringer"	4:35
7.	"Octavia"	3:21
8.	"Transit II"	0:30
9.	"No Color"	4:39
10.	"Indoor Kid"	3:42
11.	"White Fence"	3:40
12.	"Just My Luck"	3:40
13.	"Cash for the Fears"	3:51
14.	"Transit III"	1:27
15.	"Coma Phase"	6:04

Charts

Run Rabbit Run. Mainstream rock #31
