= Black Map =

American post-hardcore

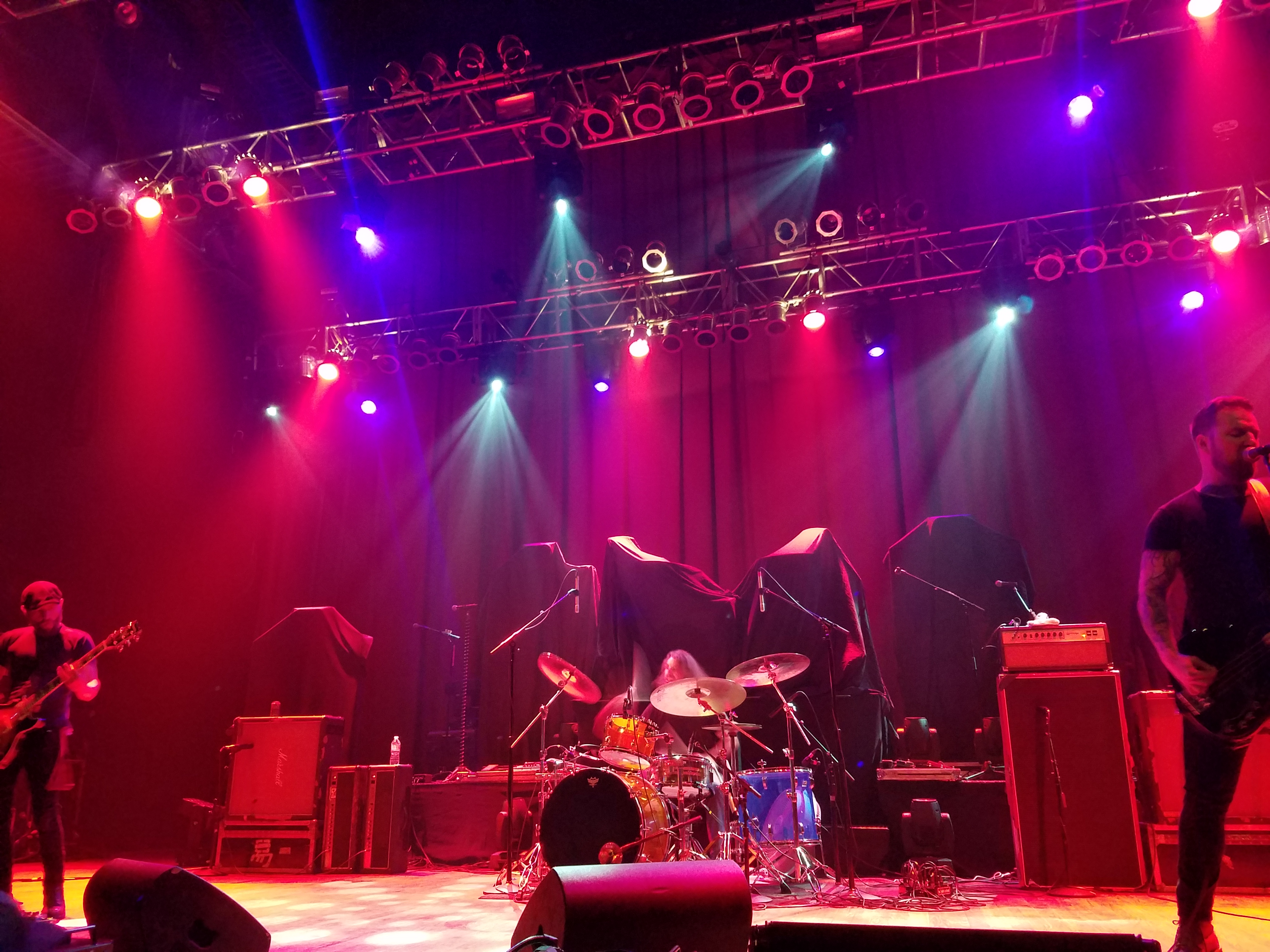
- Black Map performing in 2018

Background information
- Origin: San Francisco, California, United States
- Genres: Alternative rock; post-hardcore
- Labels: Spinefarm Records; Minus Head; EOne
- Members: Mark Engles; Chris Robyn; Ben Flanagan
- Website: blackmapmusic.com

Black Map (stylized as BL∀CK MAP) was an American post-hardcore supergroup based out of San Francisco, California. The trio consists of Ben Flanagan on bass and vocals, Chris Robyn on drums and Mark Engles on guitar. The band most recently has toured with Chevelle, Bush, and Circa Survive.

Black Map formed following a hiatus from the members' respective bands: Dredg (guitarist Mark Engles), Far (drummer Chris Robyn), and The Trophy Fire (vocalist/guitarist Ben Flanagan). The band's first release was a four-song EP, titled Driver, released in February 2014. On October 27, 2014, the band's debut LP, ...And We Explode, was released through Minus Head Records. Their second full-length album, In Droves, was released on March 10, 2017. through their current label EOne. On February 9, 2018, Black Map released a four-song EP, titled Trace the Path.

Black Map released their third studio album, Melodoria, on February 18, 2022, through Minus Head Records. Produced with Zach Ohren and mixed by Beau Burchell, the album was praised for its dynamic range and sonic ambition. Highlights included the anthemic single “Super Deluxe” and fan-favorite “Chasms.”

In September 2024, Black Map announced their signing with Spinefarm Records, a milestone for the band. Alongside this announcement, they released their first new single in over two years, “Disintegrate,” which MetalSucks described as “a towering, cinematic anthem that captures the band’s evolving sound.” The partnership with Spinefarm Records is expected to mark a new phase in their career, with additional releases anticipated in 2025.

On October 12, 2026, the band announced they had broken up.

== Discography ==
=== EPs ===
- Driver (2014)
- Trace The Path (2018)

=== Studio albums ===
- ...And We Explode (2014)
- In Droves (2017)
- Melodoria (2022)
- Hex (2025)

=== Singles ===
Year	Song	Peak chart positions	Album	Link
Year	Song	US Main.	Album	Link
2017	"Run Rabbit Run"	31	In Droves	
2025	"Hex (Come Get It)"	39	Hex	

=== Music Videos ===
List of music videos, showing year released and directors
Title	Year	Album	Director(s)
"I'm Just the Driver"	2014	...And We Explode	Frank Door
"Gold"	2014	...And We Explode	Unknown
"Run Rabbit Run"	2017	In Droves	Anthony J. Garay
"Octavia"	2017	In Droves	Unknown
"Ruin"	2017	In Droves	Unknown
"Let Me Out"	2018	Trace the Path	Anthony J. Garay
"Super Deluxe"	2022	Melodoria	Anthony J. Garay
"Hex (Come Get It)"	2025	Hex	J.T. Ibanez
"Badlands"	2025	Hex	Carlos Almanza
