= Spencer Fox =

American musician, singer and actor (born 1993)

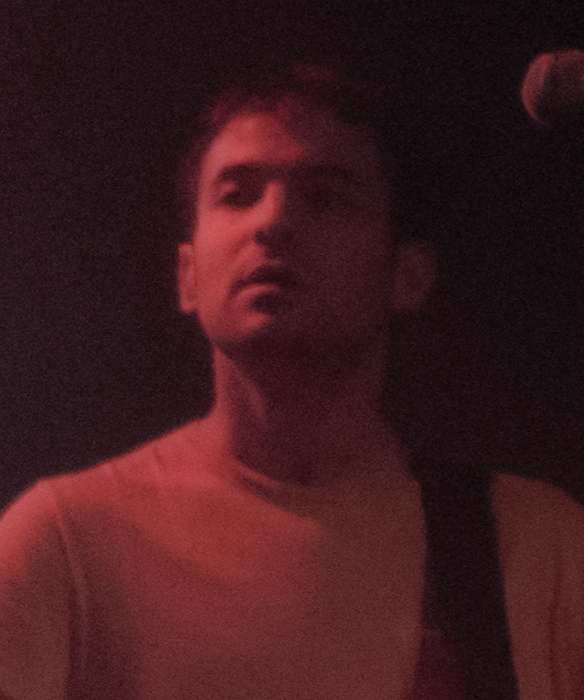
- Fox in 2018

Background information
- Born: May 10, 1993 (age 33); New York City, New York, U.S.
- Genres: Power pop; indie rock
- Occupations: Musician; singer; actor
- Instruments: Vocals; guitar; keyboards
- Years active: 2002–present
- Member of: Charly Bliss

Spencer Fox (born May 10, 1993) is an American musician, singer and former child actor. He is best known as the voice of Dash Parr in the 2004 animated film The Incredibles, and as the lead guitarist for the indie rock band Charly Bliss, which he co-founded in 2011.

== Early life ==
Fox was born in New York City on May 10, 1993. He is the son of actor Carey Fox.

== Career ==
Fox began his career in 2002 as a child voice actor between 9 years old to 11 years old. He provided the voice of Dash Parr in The Incredibles, and again in the Disney on Ice show Disney Presents Pixar's The Incredibles in a Magic Kingdom Adventure. He also provided the voices of Jim and Tim Possible for the fourth season of Kim Possible, and he was the voice of Mudbud in the first Air Buddies movie.

Fox was signed to the "Woozy Tribe" and has played some one-off shows in the NYC area. As of 2011, Fox is a member of the power pop band Charly Bliss as a vocalist and guitarist.

== Personal life ==
Fox attended Farragut Middle School in Hastings-on-Hudson, New York, and Staples High School in Westport, Connecticut. Fox studied literature at the State University of New York at Purchase. In his spare time, Fox went under the moniker "Slates" and was a solo musician.

== Discography ==
- A Lot to Say (2013)
- Soft Serve EP (2014)
- Ruby (2016)
- Turd (2016)
- Glitter (2017)
- Guppy (2017)
- Young Enough (2019)
- Forever (2024)

== Filmography ==
=== Film ===
Year	Title	Role	Notes
2004	The Incredibles	Dash Parr (voice)	
2006	The Groomsmen	Jack	
2006	Air Buddies	Mudbud (voice)	
2007	Neal Cassady	Mickey Mature	
2011	Light	Spencer	
2019	Chatroom	Hunter	Short film

=== Television ===
Year	Title	Role	Notes
2004	Late Night with Conan O'Brien	Himself / Guest	
2007	Kim Possible	Tim Possible, Jim Possible (voices)	11 episodes
2009	Cupid	Music Geek	Episode: "Left of the Dial"
2012	Gentlemen's Auto Club	Himself	

=== Video games ===
Year	Title	Voice role	Notes
2004	The Incredibles	Dash Parr	
2004	The Incredibles: When Danger Calls	Dash Parr	

=== Music videos ===
Year	Title	Role
2016	Charly Bliss: Ruby	Rodney 'Thunderdome' Carmichael / Albert Longfellow
2017	Father John Misty: Total Entertainment Forever	Bilbo Clinton
2019	Charly Bliss: Capacity	Himself
2019	Charly Bliss: Hard to Believe	Himself
2019	Charly Bliss: Young Enough	Himself
