= Junior Prom (band) =

US musical group

- Origin: Brooklyn, NY
- Genres: Alternative rock, indie pop
- Years active: 2012–present
- Label: Elektra Records
- Members: Mark Solomich
- Past members: Erik Ratensperger; John Paul Frank
- Website: junior-prom.com

Junior Prom is the artist name of Mark Solomich. Based in Brooklyn, the band has been operating since 2012 and released their debut EP in February 2014. The debut album "Young Stunners" has been released on a song by song basis starting in July 2015 with the single "Let's Make A Lot of Money"

== Career ==
=== Early beginnings ===
Solomich and Erik Ratensperger were both former members of The Rassle. Ratensperger was a member of The Virgins and Solomich of The Takeover UK. They met in 2010 in New York through mutual friends. "Basically from day one, we started playing music together." When it came time to finally decide on a band name, they received some help from a fellow bar goer. "We were talking about possible names and someone suggested Senior Prom, and this old drunk dude sitting a couple feet down was eavesdropping and he was like ‘na na na – Junior Prom’."

=== Late 2013 ===
In 2013, Jeff Castelaz signed the duo to Elektra Records and they released their first single "Sheila Put The Knife Down" on September 30, 2013. They then released their second single "International" on December 17, 2013. The single features Mark’s 66-year-old landlord singing backup vocals.

=== 2014–present ===
On February 4, 2014, the band released their self-titled debut EP. Originally, Ratensperger and Solomich "wrote and scrapped an entire album before they did the songs on the EP." The pair wrote and produced their EP, which was mostly recorded in Mark’s kitchen and the band's rehearsal space. The music video for "Sheila Put The Knife Down" was also released in February, premiering on Refinery29. After the release of their EP, it was announced that they would support Panic! at the Disco on select dates of their Too Weird to Live, Too Rare to Die! Tour. They also joined Bear Hands on a string of dates during their Summer 2014 Tour across the US. They spent the fall of 2015 on tour with Andrew McMahon in the Wilderness and Hunter Hunted. In 2014, "Sheila Put the Knife Down" spent 14 weeks in the Alt-18 countdown on Alt Nation on Sirius XM Radio and ranked 32 in the year end Alt Nation Top 36 of 2014.

Junior Prom’s music has been featured in various TV Spots. "Big Timer" was featured on the premiere of MTV’s Faking It in April 2014. A month later, it was used on MTV’s Awkward Season 4 Episode 4. Their second single, "International" appeared on ESPN’s College Basketball Anthem 2013-2014.

In January 2016 Ratensperger left the band and John Paul Frank joined to release the single "Stand!" It appeared on the soundtrack in Electronic Arts video game Need for Speed 2015. In September 2016, the band was changed to a solo project of Mark Solomich upon the release of the single "You, Me & Joe Strummer".

Solomich is also a writer/producer for other artists including Kissy ("Killer Vibes" & "Osaka") and social media star Jacob Sartorius ("All My Friends")

== Young Stunners ==
In September 2016 Solomich announced "Young Stunners" would be the name of the debut album and it would be released on a song by song basis. The album was produced by Solomich and Ian Longwell, producer/drummer for Santigold

== Discography ==
=== Junior Prom EP ===
Junior Prom's debut EP was released on February 4, 2014.

==== Track listing ====
All tracks are written by Erik Ratensperger and Mark Solomich.

No.	Title	Length
1.	"Sheila Put The Knife Down"	3:37
2.	"Run Around the Back"	3:18
3.	"Big Timer"	3:32
4.	"International"	3:18
5.	"Shoot the Guitar Player"	3:42
Total length:		17:45

=== Young Stunners LP ===
Produced by Mark Solomich and Ian Longwell at Stu Stu Studio NYC.Released on a song by song basis throughout 2016-2017.

==== Track listing ====
No.	Title	Length
1.	"Let's Make A Lot of Money"	3:21
2.	"Unknown Guilty Pleasures"	3:31
3.	"Everything You Want"	3:28
4.	"Are We All Alone?"	4:07
5.	"Stand!"	3:41
6.	"Contenders"	2:57
7.	"Untouchable"	3:41
8.	"You, Me and Joe Strummer"	3:36
9.	"So Your Boyfriend's a DJ"	3:15
10.	"Tapdancer"	4:10
11.	"Stay Awhile"	3:45
12.	"Young Stunners"	3:05
Total length:		42:02

=== Singles and remixes ===
Year	Title
May 31, 2012	"A Little Time"
June 20, 2012	"Take It Back"
September 30, 2013	"Sheila Put the Knife Down"
December 17, 2013	"International"
January 10, 2014	"Sheila Put the Knife Down" K.Flay Remix
February 10, 2014	"Sheila Put the Knife Down" Com Truise Remix
October 21, 2014	"Cheap Thrills"
July 24, 2015	"Let's Make a Lot of Money"
January 15, 2016	"Stand!"
June 6, 2016	"Unknown Guilty Pleasures"
July 13, 2016	"Un Tiempo" (Spanish language version of debut single "A Little Time")
September 16, 2016	"You, Me & Joe Strummer"
November 4, 2016	"Are We All Alone?"
December 16, 2016	"Contenders"
January 30, 2017	"Untouchable"
February 10, 2017	"So Your Boyfriend's A DJ"
February 6, 2017	"Cheap Date"
February 24, 2017	"Everything You Want"
March 17, 2017	"Tapdancer"
April 21, 2017	"Stay Awhile"
May 5, 2017	"Young Stunners"
December 15, 2017	"I Can't Go For That(No Can Do)" (Hall & Oates Cover)

== Covers ==
- September 10, 2012 "I Can't Go For That" (Hall and Oates)

- September 28, 2015 "Best Song Ever" (One Direction)
