= End of the Road Festival =

Annual music festival in England

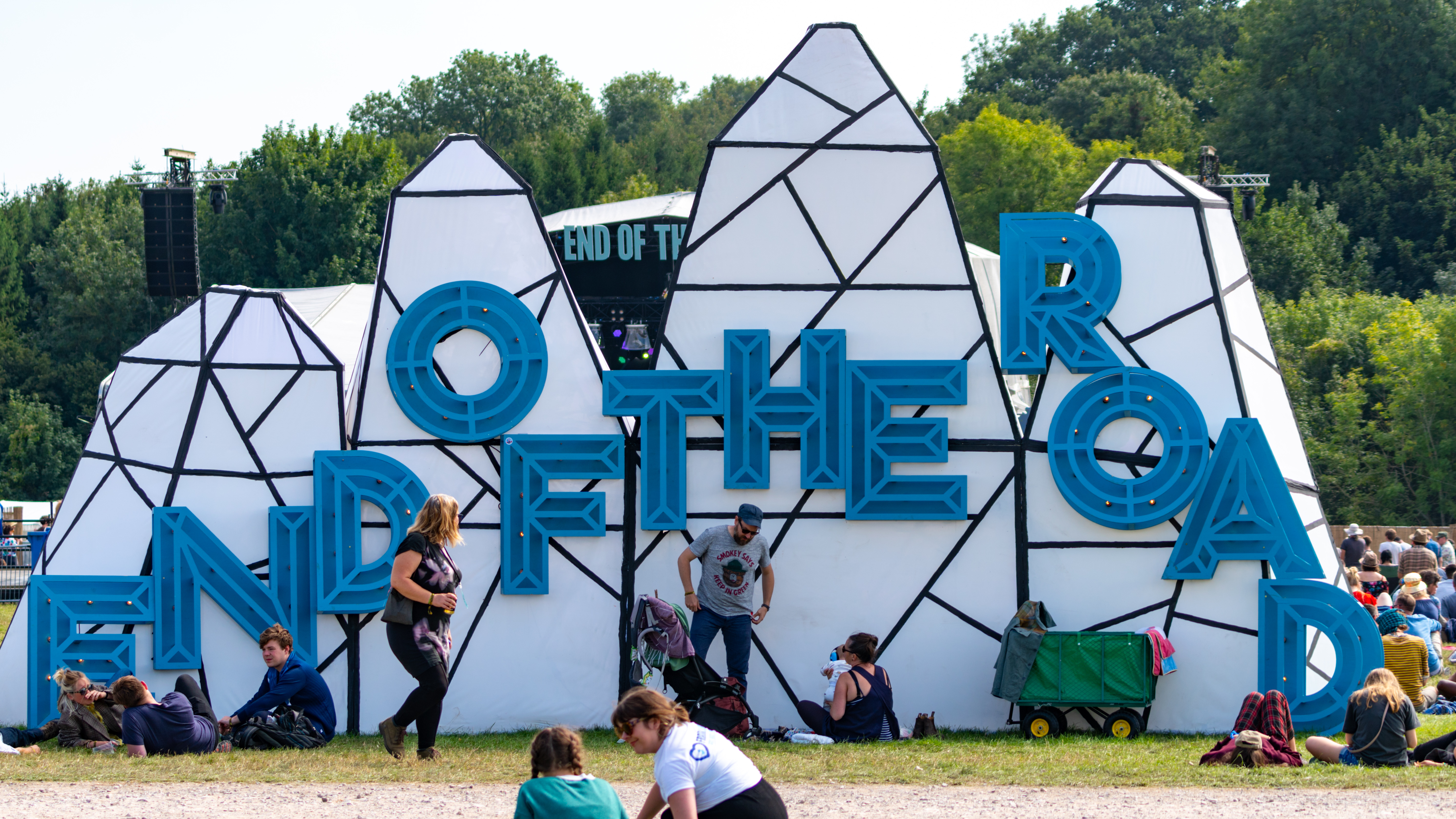
- Festival-goers in 2018
- Genre: Indie rock, folk, rock, world
- Dates: Four days, first weekend after the late summer bank holiday
- Locations: Larmer Tree Gardens, Wiltshire
- Years active: 2006–present
- Website: endoftheroadfestival.com

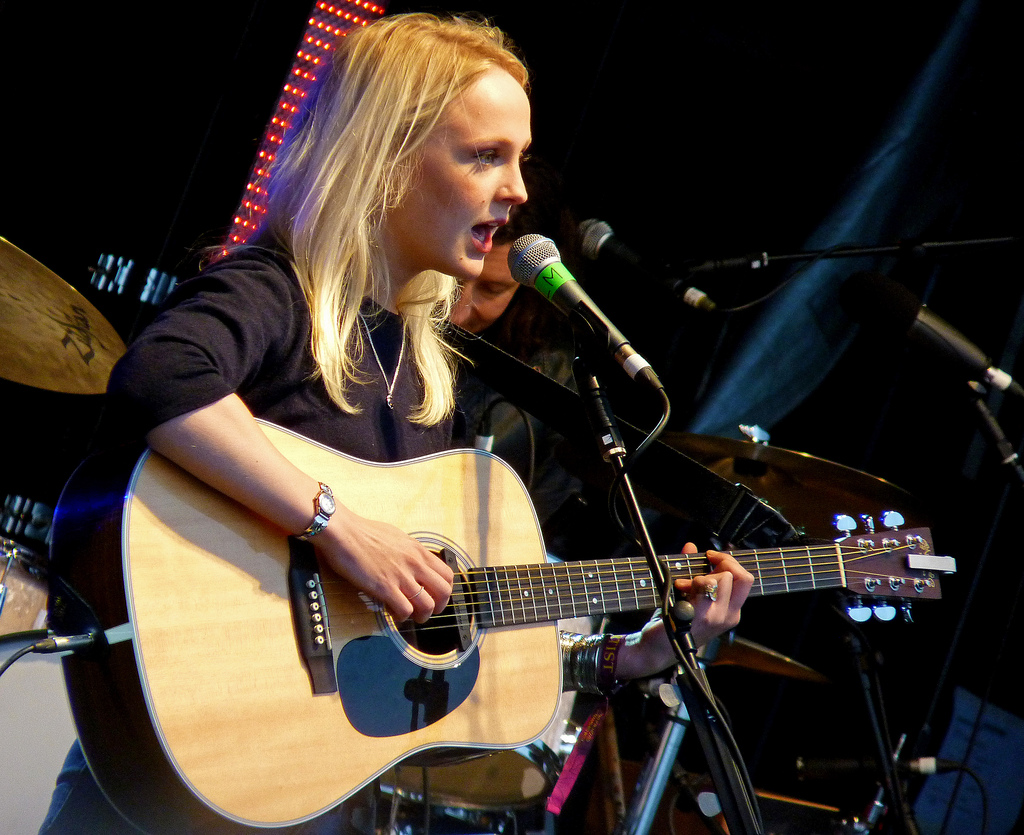
Laura Marling at End of the Road 2011

End of the Road Festival is an annual music festival in England which focuses on independent rock and folk music. It is hosted at the Larmer Tree Gardens, on the border of north Dorset and Wiltshire, and usually takes place over the last weekend of August or the first full weekend in September. The first festival took place in 2006, and after selling out for the first time in 2008, it has sold out in advance every year since.

== Origin ==
The festival was started by Simon Taffe, who continues to run it as of 2024, and his friend Sofia Hagberg, who retired in 2015. Taffe, who ran a building and decorating business before starting the festival, described its origins in an article in 2024. Planning started in 2004; Taffe mortgaged his house and borrowed widely to raise funds for the festival, which then lost money for the first three years.

== Description ==
The festival has six stages: the Woods Stage, the Garden Stage, the Big Top Stage, the Folly, The Boat and the Talking Heads, as well as a clearing in the woods around the Garden Stage containing a piano at which semi-secret sets take place. There are also children's areas and workshops, a healing field, a film tent, comedy, a library in the forest and a games area (ping pong, table football etc.). Late night entertainment usually includes high-profile DJ sets, a silent disco, unpublicised pop-up performances and karaoke. Due to the nature of the gardens the festival is set in, it is not unusual to see peacocks wandering around the area.

The festival has a capacity of 15,000 (2014). The site opens for camping on Thursday afternoon and the entertainment runs from Thursday evening to Sunday inclusive.

In 2011, the festival won an award for 'Best Small Festival' at the UK Festival Awards. In 2012 claims were made that the festival was secretly organised by Scientology. The festival stated that it had no formal link with Scientology, although two directors were Scientologists. In 2016, 2017 and 2019, the festival won an award for 'Best Small Festival' at the NME Awards.

The 2020 festival was cancelled as a result of the COVID-19 pandemic. The festival returned in 2021 with some of the same artists including King Krule, Little Simz, The Comet Is Coming, Squid, Dry Cleaning and Richard Dawson.

End of the Road 2026 will take place between 3 and 6 September.

== Line-ups ==
=== 2025 festival ===
End of the Road 2025 ran from 28 to 31 August.

==== Woods Stage ====
Thursday	Friday	Saturday	Sunday
Sharon Van Etten & the Attachment Theory	Caribou	Self Esteem	Father John Misty
Youth Lagoon	Goat	Mount Kimbie	Squid
Westside Cowboy	Bombino	Sofia Kourtesis	Tropical Fuck Storm
Daraa Tribes	The Bug Club	Jim Ghedi	Sylvie Kreusch
	Rosali	The Golden Dregs	Ryan Davis & the Roadhouse Band
	Good Looks	The New Eves	Floodlights

==== Garden Stage ====
Thursday	Friday	Saturday	Sunday
	Matt Berninger	Viagra Boys	Black Country, New Road
	Lisa O’Neill	Geordie Greep	Sorry
	Broadside Hacks Presents: A Celebration of the Incredible String Band	Emma-Jean Thackray	Katy J Pearson
	The Orchestra (For Now)	Personal Trainer	Vieux Farka Touré
	Wild Pink	Tyler Ballgame	Tucker Zimmerman
	Daisy Rickman	Jerron Paxton	Jake Xerxes Fussell
	Hayden Pedigo	Muireann Bradley	Shovel Dance Collective

==== Big Top ====
Thursday	Friday	Saturday	Sunday
	Erol Alkan (DJ)	DIIV	John Maus
	Joy Orbison	Throwing Muses	For Those I Love
	These New Puritans	Moin	Blawan (Live)
	Ela Minus	Moonchild Sanelly	Mabe Fratti
	Dame Area	Ex-Easter Island Head	Miso Extra
	C.O.F.F.I.N	Mary in the Junkyard	Bambara
	Man / Woman / Chainsaw	TVOD	Cryogeyser
	Cubzoa	Search Results	Rob Auton & JFabraham Present Words with Music

==== The Folly ====
Thursday	Friday	Saturday	Sunday
Getdown Services	Chastity Belt	BDRMM	Fabiana Palladino
Anna Erhard	Florist	Ducks Ltd.	Sofie Royer
Rogê	Warhaus	Jasmine 4.T	Trace Mountains
La Sécurité	Horse Jumper of Love	Greg Freeman	Anika
Shortstraw.	C Turtle	Titanic	Adult DVD
	Silver Gore	Scott Lavene	Dutch Interior
	Dove Ellis	Lily Seabird	Slow Fiction
	Ellie O’Neill	The Sophs	
	Uwade		

==== The Boat ====
Thursday	Friday	Saturday	Sunday
	Tom Ravenscroft (DJ)	Takuya Nakamura	Astrid Sonne
	Mandy, Indiana	TAAHLIAH (Live)	Aunty Rayzor
	Jackie-O Motherfucker	Kassie Krut	Aili
	Six Organs of Admittance	Black Fondu	Glasshouse Red Spider Mite
	Smote	RIP Magic	Eva May
	Gal Go	Dactyl Terra	
	Rubie		

==== Talking Heads ====
Thursday	Friday	Saturday	Sunday
	Sabine McCalla	Merce Lemon	Ned Collette
	Mohammad Syfkhan	Jennifer Castle	Christopher Owens
	Bridget Hayden and The Apparitions	Miriam Elhaji	Yoshika Colwell

=== 2024 festival ===
The 2024 festival ran from 29 August to 1 September.

==== Woods Stage ====
Thursday	Friday	Saturday	Sunday
Bonnie "Prince" Billy	IDLES	Slowdive	Yo La Tengo
Richard Dawson	Sleater-Kinney	Jockstrap	Altin Gün
Laetitia Sadier Source Ensemble	CMAT	The Lemon Tiwgs	Nation of Language
	Nusantara Beat	Curtis Harding	Jalen Ngonda
	MRCY	Gently Tender	Julianna Riolino
	Holiday Ghosts	Brown Horse	Girl And Girl

==== Garden Stage ====
Thursday	Friday	Saturday	Sunday
	Lankum	Richard Hawley	Floating Points
	Mdou Moctar	Phosphorescent	Ty Segall (Solo Acoustic)
	Gruff Rhys	Camera Obscura	Joanna Sternberg
	Bill Ryder-Jones	Lisa O'Neill	Ichiko Aoba
	Mary Lattimore	SANAM	Florence Adooni
	Sahra Halgan	Cat Clyde	Bonny Doon
	Kassi Valazza	Julia Jacklin	Molly Lewis

==== Big Top ====
Thursday	Friday	Saturday	Sunday
	Yu-Su (DJ)	John Talabot (DJ)	Cornelius
	Baxter Dury	CASISDEAD	English Teacher
	Sprints	Billy Woods	Water From Your Eyes
	Paranoid London	Sam Morton	Slift
	Militarie Gun	Master Peace	Thus Love
	Hotwax	Lip Critic	Upchuck
	Sextile	Powerplant	Malice K
	King Hannah	The None	The Orchestra (For Now)
	Senyawa	Rob Auton & JFAbraham present Words With Music	

==== The Folly ====
Thursday	Friday	Saturday	Sunday
NewDad	Heartworms	Big Special	Lambrini Girls
MSPAINT	Durry	Flamingods	Snõõper
Gustaf	Gurriers	Mozart Estate	The Tubs
Plantoid	House of All	The Itch	Ugly
SOMOH	RVG	Odie Leigh	Tiberius b
	Wine Lips	Palehound	Maple Glider
	Mui Zyu	Freak Slug	Deary
	Hello Mary	Jellyskin	Sarah Meth
	The Shits	Cerys Hafana	Fruit Tones

==== The Boat ====
Thursday	Friday	Saturday	Sunday
	ML Buch	Tom Ravenscroft (DJ)	MC Yallah & Debmaster
	Chanel Beads	Still House Plants	Tara Clerkin Trio
	Colossal Squid	Nourished by Time	H31R
	Blue Lake	Mark William Lewis	EBBB
	Joe Gideon	Debby Friday	OTG
	Ex-Easter Island Head	Elsy Wameyo	
		NiCky	

==== Talking Heads ====
Thursday	Friday	Saturday	Sunday
	Clarissa Connelly	Sam Amidon	Dawn Landes performs the Liberated Woman's Songbook
	Jess Williamson	Jeffrey Martin	Me Lost Me
	Mary Elizabeth Remington	Anastasia Coope	

=== 2023 festival ===
End of the Road returned to Larmer Tree Gardens in 2023, from 31 August to 3 September.

==== Woods Stage ====
Thursday	Friday	Saturday	Sunday
Wilco	Unknown Mortal Orchestra	Future Islands	King Gizzard & The Lizard Wizard
Deerhoof	Greentea Peng	Wet Leg	Fatoumata Diawara
The Last Dinner Party	KOKOKO!	KOKOROKO	Lee Fields
	King Tuff	Oracle Sisters	Charley Crockett
	Say She She	CVC	TEKE::TEKE
	Royel Otis	Personal Trainer	Divorce

==== Garden Stage ====
Thursday	Friday	Saturday	Sunday
	Angel Olsen	Arooj Aftab	Ezra Furman
	Cass McCombs	Crack Cloud	Allah-Las
	The Mary Wallopers	Samia	Caitlin Rose
	Daniel Norgren	Caroline	Alogte Oho and His Sounds of Joy
	Horse Lords	Avalanche Kaito	Joan Shelley
	Charlotte Cornfield	John Francis Flynn	Sweet Baboo
	Friendship	Mabe Fratti	Floodlights

==== Big Top ====
Thursday	Friday	Saturday	Sunday
	Marie Davidson (DJ)	Elkka(DJ)	The Murder Capital
	Panda Bear & Sonic Boom	Overmono	Biig Piig
	Yeule	Charlotte Adigéry & Bolis Popul	Bar Italia
	Flohio	The Anchoress	The Murlocs
	Ela Minus	PVA	Divide And Dissolve
	Okay Kaya	Moin	Geese
	Adwaith	Big|Brave	MADMADMAD
	Fat Dog	They Hate Change	Enys Men with Live Score by the Cornish Sound Unit
	Deliluh	Saint Jude	

==== The Folly ====
Thursday	Friday	Saturday	Sunday
HMLTD	Yunè Pinku	High Vis	Infinity Knives & Brian Ennals
Heartworms	Part Chimp	Lime Garden	Yot Club
Louis Culture	Wunderhorse	Runnner	Gretel Hänlyn
Beige Banquet	Ulrika Spacek	Marina Allen	Panic Shack
Meadow Meadow	The Prize	Mary in The Junkyard	Laundromat
	Katy Kirby	Tapir!	Master Peace
	Sylvie	MF Tomlinson	Indigo Sparke
	Laura Jean	October Baby	Gena Rose Bruce
	Blue Bendy	Scott Lavene	Jessica's Brother
	Ursa Major Moving Group		

==== The Boat ====
Thursday	Friday	Saturday	Sunday
	Tom Ravenscroft (DJ)	Dungen	MC Yallah & Debmaster
	Bodega	75 Dollar Bill	System Exclusive
	Macie Stewart	The Courettes	University
	Oren Ambarchi	7ebra	Julia Reidy
	Joyful Talk	Donna Thompson	Whitney K
	Jon Mckiel	Three Spoons	
	Sculpture		

==== Talking Heads ====
Thursday	Friday	Saturday	Sunday
	Nina Nastasia	H. Hawkline	Héloïse Werner
	Sessa	Simon Joyner	Sam Burton
	Angeline Morrison	Cinder Well	Kara Jackson

=== 2022 festival ===
End of the Road returned to Larmer Tree Gardens in 2022, from 1 to 4 September.

==== Woods Stage ====
Thursday	Friday	Saturday	Sunday
Khruangbin	Fleet Foxes	Pixies	Bright Eyes
Sudan Archives	Tinariwen	Perfume Genius	Kurt Vile & The Violators
K.O.G.	Durand Jones & The Indications	Los Bitchos	Hurray for The Riff Raff
	Steam Down	Starcrawler	BCUC
	English Teacher	The Umlauts	Ural Thomas & The Pain
	Shovel Dance Collective	The Heavy Heavy	The Bug Club

==== Garden Stage ====
Thursday	Friday	Saturday	Sunday
	Black Midi	The Magnetic Fields	Aldous Harding
	Porridge Radio	Kevin Morby	Lucy Dacus
	Nilüfer Yanya	The Weather Station	Hailu Mergia
	Anaïs Mitchell	Emma-Jean Thackray	Ryley Walker
	The Golden Dregs	Alabaster DePlume	Cassandra Jenkins
	Naima Bock	Margo Cilker	Jake Xerxes Fussell
	Rosali	Yasmin Williams	Katherine Priddy

==== Big Top ====
Thursday	Friday	Saturday	Sunday
	Laurel Halo (DJ)	I.JORDAN (DJ)	Yard Act
	Battles	Ross From Friends (Live)	Scalping
	Soccer Mommy	Moor Mother	Purling Hiss
	DEHD	Priya Ragu	Willie J Healey
	WU-LU	NewDad	The Lounge Society
	Circuit Dex Yeux	Grove	Lee Patterson
	Mandy, Indiana	Modern Woman	Deathcrash
	KEG	Warrington-Runcorn New Town Development Plan	Stephen Durkan & The Acid Commune
	Automotion	Sniffany & The Nits	

==== The Tipi ====
Thursday	Friday	Saturday	Sunday
Pigs Pigs Pigs Pigs Pigs Pigs Pigs	Audiobooks	Xenia Rubinos	Ahmen Fakroun
Apollo Ghosts	Fruit Bats	Mike Polizze	Cola
Vogues	Bingo Fury	Lynks	Sinead O'Brien
Joe & The Shitboys	Skullcrusher	TV Priest	Grace Cummings
	Mess Esque	Coco	The Chisel
	M(H)AOL	Lutalo	Jana Horn
	Highschool	Nukuluk	Cobalt Chapel
	Keyah/Blu	Jealous of The Birds	Joanna Sternberg
	Lichen		Tiny Leaves

==== The Boat ====
Thursday	Friday	Saturday	Sunday
	Snapped Ankles	Tom Ravenscroft (DJ)	James Holden & Wacław Zimpel
	Lunge	Jockstrap	Bad with Phones
	Fat Dog	Taraka	O.
	Party Dozen	Bar Italia	Robert Stillman
	Aga Ujma	John Francis Flynn	Duncan Marquiss
		Lara Jones	

==== Talking Heads ====
Thursday	Friday	Saturday	Sunday
	James Yorkston	Gwennifer Raymond	Marlaena Moore
	Christian Lee Hutson	Darren Hanlon	Karima Walker
	Uwade	Sophie Jamieson	Lael Neale

=== 2021 festival ===
The 2021 festival took place from 2 September to 5 September. The line-up was as follows:

==== Woods Stage ====
Thursday	Friday	Saturday	Sunday
Stereolab	Hot Chip	Sleaford Mods	King Krule
Kikagaku Moyo	Damon Albarn	The Comet Is Coming	Little Simz
Blood Wizard	Teleman	Field Music	Black Country, New Road
	Balimaya Project	Hen Ogledd	Girl Ray
	Katy J Pearson	Modern Nature	Billy Nomates
		Pozi	Junior Brother

==== Garden Stage ====
Thursday	Friday	Saturday	Sunday
	John Grant	Jonny Greenwood	Richard Dawson
	Arlo Parks	Anna Meredith	Arab Strap
	BDRMM	Squid	Crack Cloud
	CMAT	Jane Weaver	Shirley Collins
	Modern Woman	Anteloper	Jim Ghedi
	Aoife Nessa Frances	H. Hawkline	Charlie Cunningham
	Jonny Dillon	The Golden Dregs	Anna B Savage

==== Big Top ====
Thursday	Friday	Saturday	Sunday
	Warmduscher	Auntie Flo	Girl Band
	Trash Kit	Romare	Dry Cleaning
	Lorraine James	Sipho	Porridge Radio
	Vanishing Twin	Chubby and the Gang	WH Lung
	Just Mustard	All We Are	PVA
	Lonelady	Penelope Isles	William Doyle
	Goa Express	Lee Patterson	John
	Gwenno & Angharad Davies	The Umlauts	Oldboy
		Kiran Leonard	

==== The Tipi ====
Thursday	Friday	Saturday	Sunday
NiNE8	Sarathy Korwar	Sorry	Darren Hayman
Regressive Left	Wu-Lu	Jerkcub	Big Joanie
Sam Akpro	Soccer 96	Lice	Yard Act
Fortitude Valley	Keeley Forsyth	Drug Store Romeos	Red River Dialect
	Wesley Gonzalez	Lazarus Kane	Fenne Lily
	Babii	Caroline	Pan Amsterdam
	Sleep Eaters	Bingo Fury	Dana Gavanski
	Me Rex	Melin Melyn	Tiberius B
	Mermaid Chunky		Eve Owen

==== Talking Heads Stage ====
Thursday	Friday	Saturday	Sunday
	Josie Long	Simon Amstell	Studio Electrophonique
	Willy Tea Taylor	Elijah Wolf	Michael Clark
	Naima Bock	Martha Rose	Pat T Smith
	John Francis Flynn	James Leonard Hewitson	
	Arlo Parks	Sleaford Mods	
	Shaparak Khorsandi	Flo and Joan	
	Tom Ward	Rob Auton	
	Joe Levene	Crybabies	
	Ignacio Lopez	Micky Overman	

=== 2020 festival ===
The 2020 festival was cancelled due to the COVID-19 pandemic, though some artists still performed without the crowds and it was possible to watch live online. It was to have been headlined by the Pixies, Angel Olsen, King Krule and Big Thief, with other notable slots taken by Bright Eyes, Richard Hawley and Little Simz. Some of the acts featured on the proposed line-up went on to play the 2021 edition of the festival, though this was hampered by notable COVID-19 travel restrictions.

=== 2019 festival ===
The 2019 festival took place from 29 August to 1 September. The line-up was as follows:

==== Woods Stage ====
Thursday	Friday	Saturday	Sunday
Spiritualized	Michael Kiwanuka	Courtney Barnett	Metronomy
Flamingods	Baxter Dury	Kae Tempest	Deerhunter
	Bodega	Goat Girl	Cate Le Bon
	The Beths	KOKOKO!	BCUC
	Steve Gunn	Nubya Garcia	Steam Down
	Westerman	Martha	Pom Poko

==== Garden Stage ====
Friday	Saturday	Sunday
Parquet Courts	Low	Jarvis Cocker (Introducing JARV IS...)
Mitski	Kikagaku Moyo	BC Camplight
Cass McCombs	Black Midi	serpentwithfeet
Let's Eat Grandma	Lonnie Holley	Tunng
Jade Bird	Tyler Childers	Israel Nash
Stella Donnelly	William Tyler	Jessica Pratt
Ohtis	Nérija	Seazoo

==== Big Top ====
Friday	Saturday	Sunday
Joy Orbison	Daniel Avery	BEAK>
Kelly Lee Owens	Sleaford Mods	Fontaines D.C.
Wire	Moses Boyd Exodus	Ata Kak
Yves Tumor	Kero Kero Bonito	Pigs Pigs Pigs Pigs Pigs Pigs Pigs
Georgia	Gazelle Twin	Viagra Boys
SASAMI	Bilge Pump	Crack Cloud
Kelly Moran	Squid	Lewsberg
Once & Future Band	TVAM	Sweaty Palms

==== The Tipi ====
Thursday	Friday	Saturday	Sunday
Jockstrap	Derya Yildirim & Grup Simsek	N0V3L	Mark Mulcahy
Du Blonde	BodyVice	Black Country, New Road	The Murder Capital
Pottery	Penya	Porridge Radio	Babe Rainbow
Peach Pyramid	Mary Lattimore	Sam Evian	Group Listening
	Virginia Wing	Lisa O'Neill	Sandro Perri
	girl in red	Nardeydey	Sons Of Raphael
	Kathryn Joseph	Jim Ghedi	Sing Leaf
	E.B. The Younger	Happyness	
	Harrison Whitford	Molly Sarlé	

==== Talking Heads Stage ====
Friday	Saturday	Sunday
Rozi Plain	Oliver Coates	Angelo de Augustine
Charlie Parr	John Johanna	Anna St. Louis
Helena Deland		

=== 2018 festival ===
The 2018 festival took place from 30 August to 2 September. The line-up was as follows:

==== Woods Stage ====
Thursday	Friday	Saturday	Sunday
Yo La Tengo; Shopping	St. Vincent; Fat White Family; Josh T. Pearson; Lucy Dacus; Du Blonde; Red River Dialect	Vampire Weekend; Gruff Rhys; Shame; Omar Souleyman; Shannon and the Clams; A. Wesley Chung	Feist; Ezra Furman; Titus Andronicus; Imarhan; The Liminanas; Plastic Mermaids

==== Garden Stage ====
Friday	Saturday	Sunday
Jeff Tweedy; Big Thief; The Low Anthem; This Is the Kit; Hiss Golden Messenger; Daniel Blumberg; Tiny Ruins	Oh Sees; Destroyer; Mulatu Astatke; (Sandy) Alex G; Julien Baker; Boy Azooga; Stealing Sheep's Suffragette Tribute; Colter Wall	White Denim; John Cale; Julia Holter; Jonathan Wilson; The Wave Pictures (late replacements for Damien Jurado); Richard Dawson; Haley Heynderickx

==== Big Top ====
Friday	Saturday	Sunday
Protomartyr; The Orielles; Simon Raymonde's Lost Horizons; Tirzah; Amyl and the Sniffers; Nilufer Yanya; Creatures; Penelope Isles	James Holden and the Animal Spirits; Hookworms; Sunflower Bean; Wild Billy Childish and the CTMF; Flat Worms; Duds; Insecure Men; Screaming Females	Ariel Pink; Idles; Iceage; Japanese Breakfast; Amen Dunes; The Posies; AK/DK; Zulu Zulu

==== The Tipi ====
Thursday	Friday	Saturday	Sunday
Kiran Leonard; Bas Jan; Laura Misch; Suggested Friends	Warmduscher; The Scorpios; Powerdove; Moor Mother; Zimpel / Ziolek; Darren Hayman; Warhaus; The Weather Station; Saba Lou; Stella Donnelly	Snapped Ankles; Sweet Baboo; Soccer Mommy; Gwenno; Josienne Clarke and Ben Walker; Samuel R. Saffery; Caroline Spence; Lail Arad; Steve Ray Latham; Hater	Snail Mail; Aidan Crowley; Jim White; Cut Worms; David Thomas Broughton; Honey Harper; Anna Burch; Erin Rae; Unannounced late night sets were played by Amyl and the Sniffers and AK/DK with Snapped Ankles

=== 2017 festival ===
After again winning the 'Best Small Festival' award at the 2017 NME Awards, the 2017 festival took place from 31 August to 3 September. The line-up included Father John Misty performing his first UK headline festival set, along with the year's only UK festival shows from Mac DeMarco, Bill Callahan, Lucinda Williams, Amadou & Mariam, Ty Segall, Perfume Genius, Parquet Courts, Alvvays, Foxygen, Car Seat Headrest, Jens Lekman, Baxter Dury, Deerhoof and Waxahatchee. Acts returning to the festival from previous years included Japandroids, Pond, Nadine Shah, Bill Ryder-Jones, Jens Lekman, Ryley Walker, Ultimate Painting, Parquet Courts, DUDS, Gulp and Marika Hackman. Other notable acts, including The Jesus & Mary Chain, Slowdive, Real Estate, The Lemon Twigs, The Moonlandingz, Rolling Blackouts Coastal Fever, Moses Sumney, Deerhoof, Laraaji, Kelly Lee Owens, Brix & the Extricated, Waxahatchee, Xylouris White and Starcrawler, performed at the festival for the first time.

=== 2016 festival ===
Following on from winning the 'Best Small Festival award at the 2016 NME Awards, the 2016 festival took place on 1–4 September, expanding to the Thursday night for the first time. The line up included The Shins, Joanna Newsom, Animal Collective, Bat For Lashes, Cat Power, Teenage Fanclub, Devendra Banhart, Local Natives, Goat, Savages, Thee Oh Sees, Broken Social Scene, Phosphorescent, Thurston Moore, Sam Beam & Jesca Hoop, M. Ward, Scritti Politti, Jeffrey Lewis & Los Bolts, Steve Mason, JD McPherson, Shura, Field Music, Omar Souleyman, King Gizzard & the Lizard Wizard, Bill Ryder-Jones, Kevin Morby, Eleanor Friedberger, Dr. Dog, Kelley Stoltz, U.S Girls, Money, Anna Meredith, Jenny Hval, Ezra Furman, Field Music, Sunflower Bean, Karl Blau, Tigercats, Lail Arad and J.F. Robitaille, Meilyr Jones, Hard Skin, Kevin Morby, B.C. Camplight, BEAK>, The Leaf Library, Flamingods and many more.

=== 2015 festival ===
In 2015 the festival celebrated its 10th anniversary and it took place on 4–6 September. The line up included Tame Impala, Sufjan Stevens in his only 2015 European festival date and The War on Drugs, Mac Demarco, Future Islands, My Morning Jacket, Laura Marling, Django Django, Alvvays, Fat White Family, Slow Club, The Duke Spirit, The King Khan & BBQ Show, Torres, Oscar, Hinds, Low, Fuzz, Natalie Prass, Ought, Stealing Sheep, Giant Sand, Marika Hackman, Kevin Morby, East India Youth, Sleaford Mods, Girlpool, Du Blonde, Brakes, Wand, Jacco Gardner, Flo Morrissey, Metz, Pond, Kiran Leonard, Peter Matthew Bauer, H Hawkline, Ryley Walker, Fumaca Preta, Ultimate Painting, Jane Weaver, Andy Shauf, Saint Etienne, Giant Sand, Palma Violets, Meilyr Jones, Euros Childs, Ex Hex, Diagrams, Stephen Steinbrink and Crushed Beaks.

=== 2014 festival ===
The festival took place 28–30 August. The 2014 headliners were "The Gene Clark No Other Band"*, The Flaming Lips and Wild Beasts. Other notable acts included St. Vincent, The Horrors, Yo La Tengo, John Grant, Stephen Malkmus and the Jicks, White Denim, British Sea Power, Gruff Rhys, Tune-Yards, Unknown Mortal Orchestra, Ezra Furman, Adult Jazz, The Wave Pictures, Cate Le Bon, Sweet Baboo, H. Hawkline, Lucius, Perfume Genius, Lau, Archie Bronson Outfit, The Felice Brothers, Marissa Nadler, Benjamin Booker, The Radiophonic Workshop, Jenny Lewis, Stealing Sheep, Kiran Leonard, Tiny Ruins, Benjamin Clementine, Johnny Flynn & The Sussex Wit, Sam Lee, Temples, Laish, Pink Mountaintops, Ghost of a Sabre Toothed Tiger, Woods, and Tinariwen.

The Gene Clark No Other Band was a supergroup formed especially to perform Gene Clark's 1974 solo album No Other in full. Having toured the east coast of the US, End of the Road was their sole UK performance.

=== 2013 festival ===
The 2013 festival took place from 30 August to 1 September. The line-up included Sigur Rós, Belle and Sebastian, David Byrne & St Vincent, Dinosaur Jr., Efterklang, Warpaint, Jens Lekman, Eels, Ralfe Band, Allo Darlin', Mark Mulcahy, Doug Paisley, Matthew E. White, Serafina Steer, Parquet Courts, Wolf Alice, Pokey Lafarge, Ethan Johns, Cass McCombs, Frontier Ruckus, Ed Harcourt, East India Youth, Dutch Uncles, RM Hubbert, Golden Fable, Trembling Bells & Mike Heron, Daughn Gibson, Frightened Rabbit, The Barr Brothers, The Walkmen, Charlie Boyer & the Voyeurs, Bo Ningen, Palma Violets, Public Service Broadcasting, Strand of Oaks, Marika Hackman, Landshapes, Evans the Death, Tigercats, Julianna Barwick, Caitlin Rose, William Tyler, Damien Jurado, Daughter, Deap Vally, Catfish and the Bottlemen, Diana Jones, Braids, King Khan and Doug Paisley.

=== 2012 festival ===
In 2012 the festival took place from 31 August to 2 September. Headliners were Patti Smith, Grandaddy, Beach House, Grizzly Bear, Alabama Shakes. Also playing were Dirty Three, Midlake, The Low Anthem, Roy Harper, Mark Lanegan, Tindersticks, Jeffrey Lewis, Robyn Hitchcock, Graham Coxon, Villagers, Patrick Watson, Justin Townes Earle, First Aid Kit, Deer Tick, Anna Calvi, I Break Horses, Moulettes, Gravenhurst, The Futureheads, Mountain Man, Alt-J, Islet, Sleep Party People, Frank Fairfield, Woods, Patti Smith, Tindersticks, Lanterns on the Lake, Jonathan Wilson, Leif Vollebekk, Van Dyke Parks, Deer Tick, Francois & the Atlas Mountains, Dirty Beaches and more.

=== 2011 festival ===
In 2011 the festival took place from 2 to 4 September. Headliners were Beirut, Joanna Newsom and Mogwai. Also playing were Midlake, Laura Marling, The Walkmen, Wild Beasts, The Fall, Lykke Li, Tinariwen, The Unthanks, M. Ward, Gruff Rhys, Okkervil River, Phosphorescent, John Grant, Clap Your Hands Say Yeah, Best Coast, White Denim, Tune-Yards, Willy Mason, The Black Angels, Wooden Shjips, Jolie Holland, Josh T Pearson, Kurt Vile, Micah P Hinson, James Yorkston, Gordon Gano & the Ryans, Caitlin Rose, The Leisure Society, Brakes, Zola Jesus, Austra, Beth Jeans Houghton, Timber Timbre, Allo Darlin, Bob Log III, The Unthanks, Woods, Midlake, Lanterns on the Lake, Sam Amidon and more. There was also comedy from Robin Ince, Jo Neary, and Simon Munnery and literature from Laura Barton, Rob Young, Clinton Heylin and others.

The festival won the award for "Best Small Festival" at the 2011 UK Festival Awards.

=== 2010 festival ===
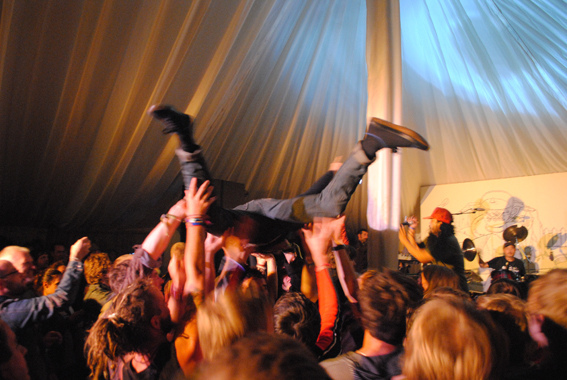
Crowdsurfer, 2010

For its fifth year, the festival took place from 10 to 12 September. Headliners were Modest Mouse, Yo La Tengo and Wilco. Also playing were Deer Tick, Wolf Parade, The Low Anthem, The Felice Brothers, Woodpigeon, Phosphorescent, The Wilderness of Manitoba, The Unthanks, Iron & Wine, The Mountains and the Trees, Annie & The Beekeepers, Dylan LeBlanc, Joe Pug, CW Stoneking, Charlie Parr, Frank Fairfield, Daniel Lefkowitz, Monotonix, The Mountain Goats, The New Pornographers, Caribou, The Antlers, Citay, Freelance Whales, a Jarvis Cocker DJ set and many more. Also present was comedian Russel Howard and music journalist Barney Hoskyns.

=== 2009 festival ===
The 2009 festival took place on 11–13 September. Explosions in the Sky, Fleet Foxes and The Hold Steady were headliners. Also playing were The Acorn, Alela Diane, Beth Jeans Houghton, Blitzen Trapper, The Boy Least Likely To, The Broken Family Band, Charlie Parr, Darren Hayman, David Thomas Broughton, Dent May & His Magnificent Ukulele, Dirty Projectors, The Dodos, Efterklang, Herman Dune, The Horrors, Josh T Pearson, The Leisure Society, The Low Anthem, Malcolm Middleton, Mumford & Sons, Neko Case, Okkervil River, Richmond Fontaine, Shearwater, Steve Earle, Vetiver and Wildbirds & Peacedrums.

=== 2008 festival ===
For the first sellout year, over 12–14 September, the headliners were Conor Oberst & The Mystic Valley Band, Mercury Rev and Calexico. Also appearing were A Hawk And A Hacksaw, Akron/Family, American Music Club, Billy Childish and the Musicians of the British Empire, Bon Iver, Brakes, British Sea Power, Darren Hayman playing Hefner songs, Dirty Three, Jason Molina, Jeffrey Lewis, Kimya Dawson, Kurt Wagner, Laura Marling, Low, Micah P Hinson, The Mountain Goats, Noah & the Whale, Richard Hawley, Robyn Hitchcock, Someone Still Loves You Boris Yeltsin, Sons of Noel and Adrian, Sun Kil Moon, Tindersticks, Two Gallants, The Wave Pictures and Zombie Zombie.

=== 2007 festival ===
The second event, held 14–16 September, was given a five-star review by The Independent newspaper. It was headlined by Yo La Tengo, Super Furry Animals and Lambchop, and also featured Archie Bronson Outfit, Architecture in Helsinki, The Bees, Brakes, British Sea Power, The Broken Family Band, The Concretes, Danielson, Darren Hayman, Dawn Landes, Euros Childs, Frida Hyvönen, Herman Dune, Howe Gelb (who also curated the two main stages on the Friday, headlining the Big Top stage with a Giant Sand jam session), I'm from Barcelona, James Yorkston, Jeffrey Lewis, Jens Lekman, Joan As Police Woman, John Parish, Johnny Flynn, Josh T Pearson, King Creosote, Loney Dear, Malcolm Middleton, Midlake, Pete and the Pirates, Robyn Hitchcock (who was accompanied by John Paul Jones), Scout Niblett, Seasick Steve, Stephanie Dosen, The Twilight Sad, Willard Grant Conspiracy and Zombie Zombie.

=== 2006 festival ===
The first festival took place on 15–17 September. It was headlined on the Friday by Josh Ritter, on Saturday by Badly Drawn Boy and on Sunday by Ryan Adams. Other artists included Absentee, The Boy Least Likely To, Brakes, British Sea Power, Chris T-T, Darren Hayman, Dawn Landes, Ed Harcourt, El Perro Del Mar, Electric Soft Parade, Emmy the Great, Fanfarlo, Frightened Rabbit, Gravenhurst, Guillemots, Holly Golightly, Howe Gelb, I'm from Barcelona, James Yorkston, Jeremy Warmsley, Jim Noir, Jolie Holland, Kathryn Williams, Metronomy, Micah P Hinson, Richard Hawley, Simple Kid, Suburban Kids with Biblical Names, and Tilly and the Wall.
