= Program Records =

Australian vinyl pressing plant

- Company type: Pressing plant
- Founded: 27 Apr 2017
- Founder: Steve Lynch, Dave Roper
- Headquarters: Thornbury, Victoria, Australia
- Website: programrecords.com

Program Records is a vinyl record pressing facility in Thornbury, Victoria, Australia. It is one of only three in Australia.

Program Records was founded by Steve Lynch and Dave Roper in 2017. After an initial announcement to launch in 2018, Program began pressing in 2020, when the only other Australian pressing plant was Zenith Records. By 2023, Program employed 13 staff and had pressed records by major international and local artists, including Courtney Barnett, King Gizzard & the Lizard Wizard, and Jimmy Barnes. They press between 1500 and 1800 units daily, over ten hours.

The pressing plant uses WarmTone presses from Viryl Technologies in Canada, and sources vinyl compound locally.

In 2021, Program launched a Vinyl Deposit Scheme, where unwanted vinyl records can be donated to be turned into new records.

The success of Program lead to Neil Wilson opening Suitcase Records, a third Australian pressing plant, based in Brisbane.
