= Goblin Band =

English folk band

- Genres: Folk
- Years active: 2022–present
- Label: Broadside Hacks
- Members: Alice Beadle; Sonny Brazil; Rowan Gatherer; Gwena Harman

Goblin Band is an English folk band based in London. The band formed around folk sessions at Hobgoblin Music in London, where the band's name came from. Their debut EP 'Come Slack Your Horse!' was released on 1 May 2024 on Broadside Hacks, and was lauded by prominent musicians like Paul McCartney and Martin Carthy. As part of a steadily rising profile, their second release and first full-length album A Loaf of Wax (Live from MOTH Club) was released on 14 November 2025.

== Current members ==
- Alice Beadle – fiddle, recorder, vocals
- Sonny Brazil – accordion, concertinas, vocals
- Rowan Gatherer – hurdy-gurdy, recorders, vocals
- Gwena Harman – pump organ, drum, vocals

== Discography ==
- Come Slack Your Horse! (EP, May 2024, Broadside Hacks)
- A Loaf of Wax (Live from MOTH Club) (Album, November 2025, Broadside Hacks)
- Clyde Water / Go From My Window (Single, April 2026, Broadside Hacks)
