= I Would Not Live Always =

Studio album by John Francis Flynn
- Released: 30 July 2021
- Genre: Irish folk music
- Length: 44:06
- Language: English
- Label: River Lea
- Producer: Brendan Jenkinson

John Francis Flynn chronology
I Would Not Live Always (2021)	Look Over the Wall, See the Sky (2023)

“Songs come and go for me — but that one song, I’ve always sung it... I feel like I’m friends with that song, almost. It’s the song I’ve gone with the furthest. It’s never got to the point where I’m tired of it. It’s a very emotional experience. It’s very much of the Irish experience of emigration. When you’re singing the song, you try to drop the ego and let people in.”

— Flynn on including the traditional "Come My Son" as this album's closer

I Would Not Live Always is the debut full-length album by Irish folk musician John Francis Flynn. The album mixes traditional music with contemporary instrumentation and has received positive reviews from critics.

== Reception ==
A 2022 profile of Flynn in Financial Times found Garth Cartwright calling this album "unique [for] both Flynn’s voice—mournful, deep, expressive—and the adventurous arrangements of songs by celebrated British folk authorities Shirley Collins and Ewan MacColl, alongside centuries-old ballads". In The Guardian, Jude Rogers scored this release 4 out of 5 stars, stating that it has "an unearthly intensity" that made it the folk album of the month. The publication listed it among the best albums of August 2021 and it topped the best folk releases of the year. In Hot Press, Kate Brayden gave this album a 9 out of 10, calling it "at times otherworldly and poignant, often hauntingly gripping but always spine-tingling". The Irish Times also included it among their 10 best Irish albums of the year. In an overview of the best Irish underground music for October 2021, The Quietus' Eoin Murray called this release "traditional songs with an experimental twist, weaving subtle elements of kosmische and electronic music into the form’s deep roots" with "drones that tie Irish folk music to numerous contemporary experimental styles gleam". In Uncut, Rob Hughes gave this album 4 out of 5 stars, characterizing it as "an extraordinary debut by any standard" and praising Flynn's combination of traditional tunes with modern sounds and supporting session players.

== Track listing ==
1. "Lovely Joan" – 3:56
2. "Cannily, Cannily" – 5:44
3. "My Son Tim" – 2:41
4. "Tralee Gaol" – 2:53
5. "Shallow Brown" – 7:57
6. "Chaney's Tape Dream" – 2:05
7. "Bring Me Home Pt. I The Dear Irish Boy" – 3:13
8. "Bring Me Home Pt. II I Would Not Live Always" – 4:11
9. "Bring Me Home Pt. III An Buachaillín Bán" – 4:09
10. "Come My Little Son" – 7:19

== Personnel ==
- John Francis Flynn – guitar, tin whistle, vocals
- Consuelo Nerea Breschi – vocals
- Ross Chaney – drums, synthesizer, loops
- Phil Christie – keyboards
- Brendan Jenkinson – synthesizer, clarinet, electric guitar, engineering, mixing, production
- Saileog Ní Cheannabháin – vocals
- Ultan O'Brien – fiddle

== Charts ==
Chart performance for I Would Not Live Always
Chart (2021)	Peak position
UK Folk Albums (Official Charts)	8
UK Independent Albums (Official Charts)	49

== See also ==
- List of 2021 albums
