= Crack Cloud =

Canadian punk band

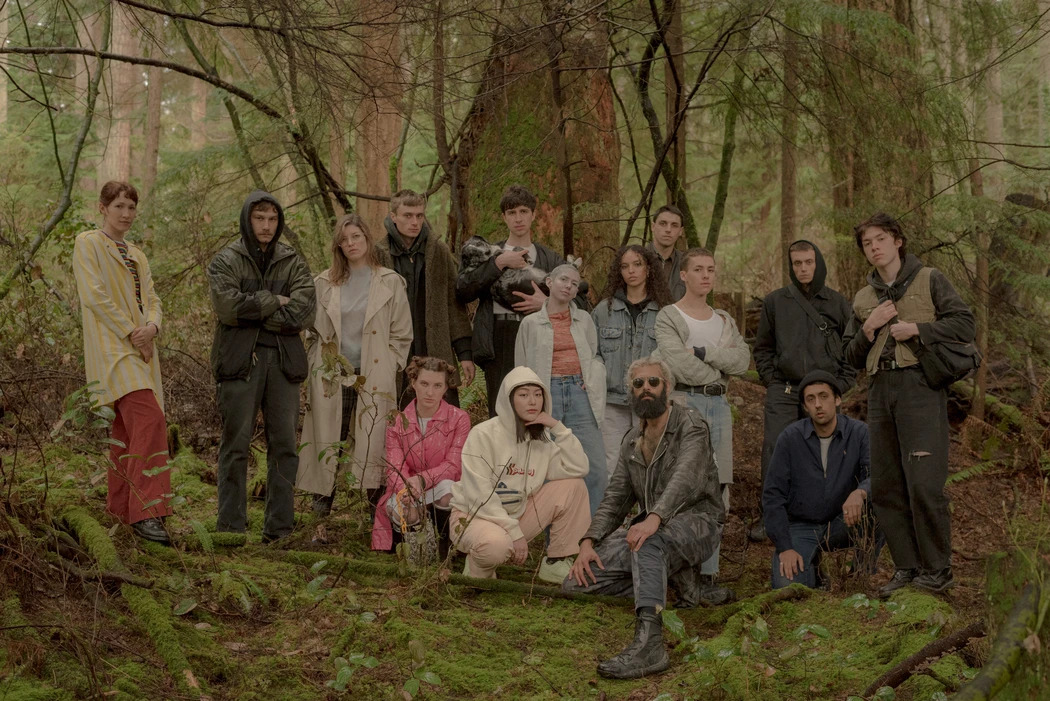

Background information
- Origin: Calgary, Alberta, Canada
- Genres: Art punk, post-punk new wave, avant garde avant pop, electropunk, industrial hip hop, experimental
- Years active: 2015–present
- Labels: Crack Cloud Media Studio; Meat Machine; Tin Angel; Big Love Records; Deranged; Jagjaguwar
- Members: Zach Choy; Bryce Cloghesy; Aleem Khan; Emma Acs; Aidan Pontarini; Henry Hsieh
- Past members: Patrick Seager; Jon Reynolds; Will Johnson; Jon Varley; Noah Varley; Daniel Robertson; Mohammad Sharar; Garnet Aroynk; Jared Drake; William Choy; Jesse Atkey; Eve Adams; Mackenzie Cruse; Nat Philipps

Crack Cloud are a Canadian musical and multimedia collective currently based in Calgary, Alberta, formed by drummer and frontman Zach Choy. Alongside the group's core musical members who perform live as a band, a large number of multimedia artists are also associated and operate simultaneously as an in-house production studio within the group, due to the project's strong focus on visual storytelling.

To date, they have released four studio albums: Pain Olympics (2020), Tough Baby (2022), Red Mile (2024) via American independent label Jagjaguwar, and their latest, Peace and Purpose was released on March 13, 2026.

== History ==
Formed in 2015, Crack Cloud started as the solo project of lead vocalist and drummer Zach Choy while he was living in Calgary, Alberta. Soon after, the project moved to Vancouver, British Columbia, in 2018, where most of its members met through various addiction recovery and mental health programmes both as participants and as support workers. Choy stated that the purpose of Crack Cloud is a "healing mechanism". The group's logo is also notable as an appropriation of the exclamation mark used by Concerned Children's Advertisers, a series of public service-announcements aimed towards children on various topics (drug abuse, peer pressure, exercise, etc.) that were broadcast on Canadian television during 1990s until the mid-2000s.

Crack Cloud released their first self-titled EP, in 2016, followed by another the next year called Anchoring Point in 2017. These two EP's were re-released as a self-titled compilation via Deranged and Tin Angel/Meat Machine Records on 1 June 2018. Following those releases, the group toured internationally and featured at several music festivals including Levitation, End of the Road, and Roskilde which garnered the group considerable exposure between North America, the United Kingdom and Europe respectively.

Crack Cloud released their debut studio album, Pain Olympics, via Meat Machine Records on 17 July 2020, preceded by four singles, "The Next Fix", "Ouster Stew", "Tunnel Vision", and "Favour Your Fortune", released between May 2019 until October 2020. The record was received favourably, based on the album receiving an average score of 87 from 8 reviews on Metacritic, indicating "universal acclaim".

On 8 July 2021, the group were named as the winners of the Hi-Fidelity Award, a prize for Canadian recording artists use of innovation within their music videos at the 2021 Prism Prize.

On 11 May 2022, Crack Cloud announced their second album, Tough Baby, released 16 September 2022, via Meat Machine, with the release of the album's first single, "Please Yourself". The album's self-titled second single was released on 8 July 2022. "Costly Engineered Illusion", the album's third single was released 1 September 2022.

On 15 May 2024, the group revealed they had signed to American independent label, Jagjaguwar, and announced their third studio album, Red Mile, set to be released 26 July 2024. The announcement was in-tandem with the album's first single, "Blue Kite". Follow-up single, "The Medium" was released soon after on 18 June 2024.

On 8 January 2026, Crack Cloud announced their fourth studio album, Peace and Purpose, alongside release of its lead single, "Safe Room". The album released on 13 March 2026 via Tin Angel and Meat Machine.

== Members ==
Current

- Zach Choy – lead vocals, drums, synthesizer, film editing, production, percussion, creative direction (2015–present)
- Bryce Cloghesy – saxophone, lead guitar, sampler (2018–present), piano, synthesizer, organ (2025–present)
- Aleem Khan – keyboards, synthesizer, percussion, backing vocals (2021–present) rhythm guitar, bass, organ (2023–present)
- Aidan Pontarini – production (2023–present), creative direction, film editing (2023–2024)
- Emma Acs – backing and occasional lead vocals, keyboards (2024–present)
- Henry Hsieh – rhythm guitar (2016–2017), bass (2026–present)

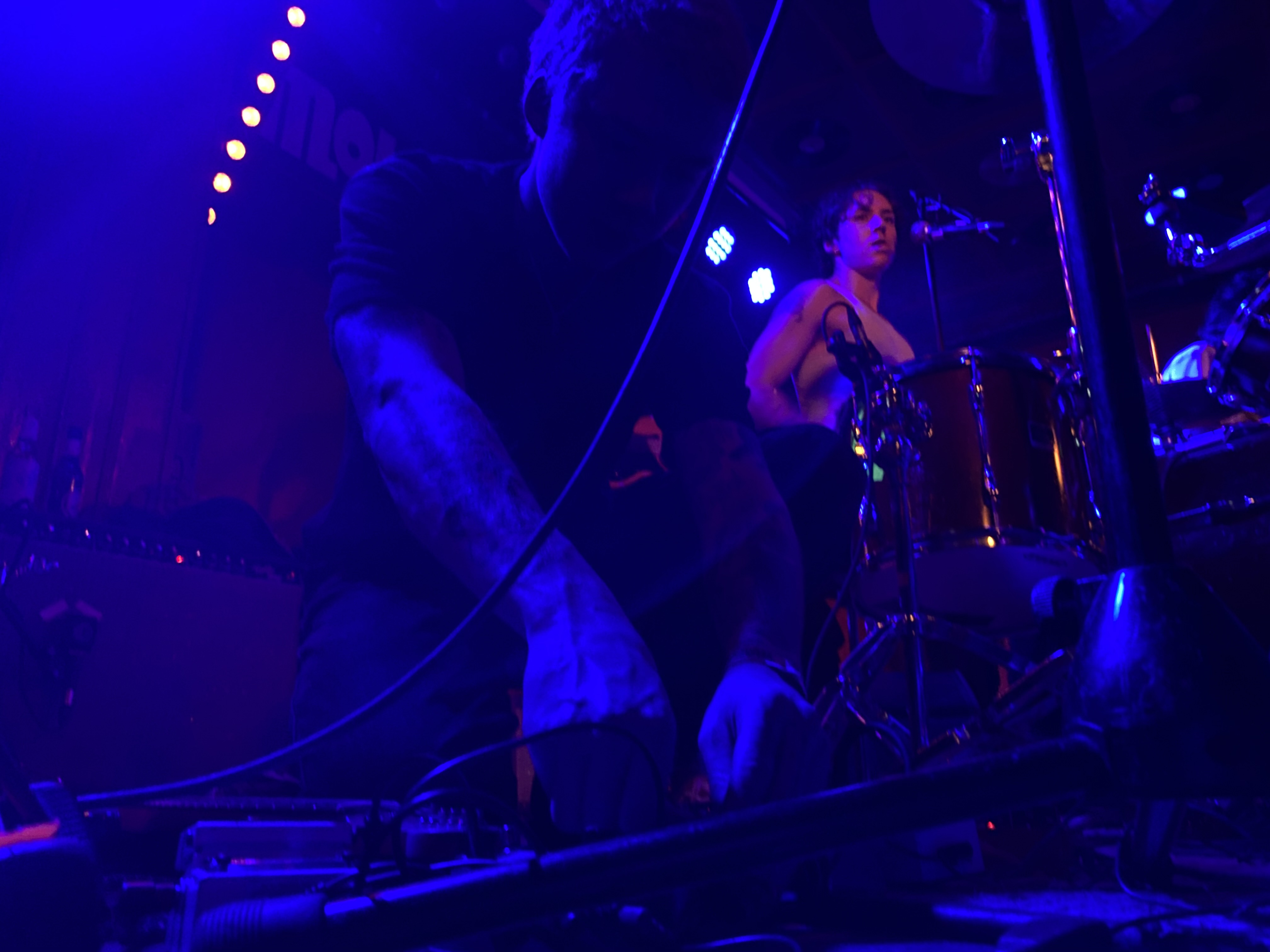
Crack Cloud – live @ Molotow Club in Hamburg, Germany (November 2022)

Former

- Patrick Seager – rhythm guitar, backing vocals (2016–2017)
- Jon Reynolds – lead guitar, saxophone, backing vocals (2016–2017)
- Will Johnson – lead guitar, bass, backing vocals (2016–2017)
- Jon Varley – lead guitar, backing vocals (2017–2019)
- Noah Varley – bass, saxophone (2017–2019)
- Kelsie Hjorleifson – bass (2018)
- Daniel Robertson – keyboards, synthesizer, rhythm guitar, backing vocals (2018–2021)
- Megan Magdalena – bass, backing vocals (2020–2021)
- Mohammad "Mo" Ali Sharar – rhythm guitar, bass, keyboards, sampler, backing vocals, production, graphic design, film editing (2016–2022)
- Garnet Aroynk Muhammad – rhythm guitar, bass, backing vocals (2019–2022)
- Camryn Sproule – keyboards, synthesizer, backing vocals (2022)
- David Proctor – lead guitar, bass, backing vocals (2022)
- Mikhail Oreshkov – guitar, bass, backing vocals (2022)
- Jared Drake – bass, backing vocals (2016–2017; 2023–2024)
- Will Choy – lead guitar, backing vocals (2017–2024), lead vocals (2024)
- Jesse Atkey – saxophone, sampler, backing vocals (2018–2022; 2024)
- Eve Adams – backing vocals (2024; associate 2018–2024)
- Mackenzie Cruse – backing vocals, graphic design (2024; associate 2018–2024)
- Nat Philipps – saxophone (2022–2026)

Associates

- Alex Burke – choir, percussion
- Nicolas Dirksen – engineering, mixing, strings, additional percussion, additional synthesizer
- Missy Donaldson – backing vocals
- Silvia Fioretti – choir, percussion
- Richard Guy – production
- Oliver Hamilton – violin
- Victoria Hamblett – choir, percussion
- Wei Huang – graphic design, lettering
- Annalisa Iembo – sound engineer
- Syd Kemp – choir, percussion, mixing
- Amy Lowe – graphic design, assistant choreography
- Jennilee Marigomen – photography
- Magdalena McLean – violin
- Sage Aronyk Muhammad – percussion, backing vocals
- David Novotny – guitar, lap steel, flute
- Eris Nyx – artist, activist, community organizer
- Arthur Sajas – flute, choir, percussion
- Eden Solomon – dancer, choreography
- John Paul Stewart – engineering, mixing, processing
- Joseph Stone – saxophone, percussion
- Gam Traynor – cello
- Aga Ujma – harp, backing vocals
- Jing Wang – photography, graphic design, assistant choreography

== Discography ==
Studio Albums

- Pain Olympics (2020)
- Tough Baby (2022)
- Red Mile (2024)
- Peace and Purpose (2026)

Live Albums

- Crackin Up: Live In London (2023)

EPs

- Crack Cloud (2016)
- Anchoring Point (2017)

Compilations

- Crack Cloud (2018)
- Live Leak (2020)

== Music videos ==
=== As "Crack Cloud" ===
Title	Year	Album
"Image Craft"	2016	Anchoring Point
"Swish Swash"	2017	Anchoring Point
"Uncanny Valley"	2018	Non-album single
"The Next Fix"	2019	Pain Olympics
"Crackin Up"	2019	Non-album single
"Ouster Stew"	2020	Pain Olympics
"Tunnel Vision"	2020	Pain Olympics
"Favour Your Fortune"	2020	Pain Olympics
"Please Yourself"	2022	Tough Baby
"Tough Baby"	2022	Tough Baby
"Costly Engineered Illusion"	2022	Tough Baby
"Blue Kite"	2024	Red Mile
"The Medium"	2024	Red Mile
"Safe Room"	2026	Peace and Purpose

=== As "Crack Cloud Media Studio" ===
Title	Year	Album
"Elastic" (ZDBT & Slim Media Player featuring Prado)	2021	ELASTIC
"Preoccupation" Black Marble	2021	Fast Idol

== Recognition ==
=== Prism Prize ===
The Prism Prize is a national, juried award established to recognize outstanding artistry in the Canadian music video production community. The Hi-Fidelity Award is presented to a recording artist (band or musician) who has used video art to represent their work in a consistently creative and innovative way.

Year	Nominee / work	Award	Result
2021	Crack Cloud	Hi-Fidelity Award	Won
