= Bite Down =

Studio album by Rosali
- Released: March 22, 2024
- Genre: Folk rock
- Length: 44:45
- Language: English
- Label: Merge
- Producer: Rosali; James Schroeder

Rosali chronology
No Medium (2021)	Bite Down (2024)

I tried not to let it because you never know how anything's going to go. I don't ever want to make music or art with a commercial idea or any of that in mind. But I definitely felt pressure on myself because I felt like No Medium was an important record to me and to a lot of other people, and I wanted to make a record that was just as good as that.

—Rosali on releasing Bite Down on Merge Records, a larger label than her previous albums.

Bite Down is a 2024 studio album by American indie rock musician Rosali, released by Merge Records. It has received positive reviews from critics.

== Reception ==
Editors at AllMusic rated this album 4.5 out of 5 stars, with critic Fred Thomas writing that on this album, "Rosali offers the best examples yet of her peculiar ability to craft songs that sound uncannily at peace as they explode, and to sing about time-halting vulnerabilities in a calm, almost relaxed voice... one that communicates full-hearted intensity without ever resorting to heavy-handedness or overstatement". Online retailer Bandcamp chose this as Album of the Day, where reviewer Marian Timony emphasized the strength of Rosali's collaborations on what she called "one of 2024's most remarkable records, arriving fully-formed with songs lightly blending a smooth and poppy style of inward-looking yet universal singer-songwriter fare and cosmically-inclined free-form rock experimentalism". At BrooklynVegan, Andrew Sacher compared this work to Neil Young and stated that "Bite Down's mix of intimate folk music and electrified jams has already gotten its fair share of Crazy Horse comparisons, while Rosali's warm, soaring voice has echoes of Fairport Convention's Sandy Denny."

Writing for Paste, Ben Salmon rated Bite Down an 8.5 out of 10, calling it "packed wall to wall with tunes that are unsettled but unhurried, generous with melody, wandering but never lost, and reliably steady despite the never-ending twists and turns of an earthly existence". In The Shepherd Express, John M. Gilbertson called this album "a reminder that the difference [between alternative country and mainstream country] still has meaning" and compared Rosali's vocals to Margo Timmins of Cowboy Junkies. Editors at Stereogum chose Bite Down as Album of the Week, where critic Chris DeVille called it "a folk rock album that actually rocks" and "one of the most stirring albums of this young year". Steven Hyden at Uproxx also dubbed this one of the best albums of the year, calling it a "real achievement" that sounds like it was "created by a gang of likeminded individuals expressing something authentic and true together"

Prior to the album's release, Boutanye Chokrane reviewed the title track for Pitchfork, characterizing it as "like going under anesthesia: disorientating at first until the mind drifts into blissful detachment" and comparing it to Aimee Mann's "Lost in Space".

A review of the best albums of the first quarter of 2024 by BrooklynVegan saw Andrew Sacher calling this work "more collaborative" than previous Rosali albums and that its release "kind of feel[s] like an event". In a May 31 roundup of the best albums of the year, editors at Exclaim! ranked this 22 for blending "searing guitar licks with outright catchiness". On June 4, Stereogum did a roundup of the best albums of the year so far and ranked this 28, with Chris DeVille stating that these songs have similarities to Gillian Welch and Yo La Tengo, and speculated that Rosali may be her generation's Neil Young. On June 10, The A. V. Club released a similar listing, including this among the 30 best of the year, where Grace Ann Natanawan stated that the backing band "has opened up her introspective folk songs, giving them a spaciousness and bar-band danceability unheard on her previous records".

== Track listing ==
All songs written by Rosali

1. "On Tonight" – 4:18
2. "Rewind" – 4:49
3. "Hills on Fire" – 5:13
4. "My Kind" – 3:46
5. "Bite Down" – 4:28
6. "Hopeless" – 3:45
7. "Slow Pain" – 4:50
8. "Is It Too Late" – 3:47
9. "Change Is in the Form" – 4:07
10. "May It Be on Offer" – 5:44

== Personnel ==
"On Tonight"

- Rosali – acoustic guitar, vocals
- Pearl Lovejoy Boyd – backing vocals
- Kevin Donahue – drums, percussion
- JJ Idt – bass guitar
- James Schroeder – electric guitar, synthesizer

"Rewind"

- Rosali – electric guitar, vocals
- Ted Bois – keyboards
- Kevin Donahue – drums, percussion
- Colin Duckworth – dobro
- David Nance – bass guitar
- James Schroeder – electric guitar

"Hills On Fire"

- Rosali – electric guitar, vocals
- Ted Bois – piano
- Kevin Donahue – drums, percussion
- David Nance – bass guitar
- James Schroeder – electric guitar

"My Kind"

- Rosali – electric guitar, vocals
- Ted Bois – piano
- Kevin Donahue – drums, percussion
- David Nance – bass guitar
- James Schroeder – electric guitar

"Bite Down"

- Rosali – vocals
- Ted Bois – keyboards
- Kevin Donahue – drums
- David Nance – bass guitar
- Megan Siebe – cello
- James Schroeder – electric guitar

"Hopeless"

- Rosali – electric guitar, vocals
- Alex Bingham – bass guitar, drum machine
- Ted Bois – synthesizer
- Kevin Donahue – drums, percussion
- David Nance – electric guitar
- James Schroeder – electric guitar

"Slow Pain"

- Rosali – electric guitar, vocals
- David Nance – bass guitar
- Kevin Donahue – drums, percussion
- James Schroeder – electric guitar
- Megan Siebe – cello

"Is It Too Late"

- Rosali – electric guitar, vocals
- Ted Bois – keyboards
- Kevin Donahue – drums
- David Nance – bass guitar
- James Schroeder – electric guitar

"Change Is in the Form"

- Rosali – electric guitar, vocals
- Ted Bois – keyboards
- Kevin Donahue – drums, percussion
- Colin Duckworth – pedal steel guitar
- David Nance – bass guitar, electric guitar
- James Schroeder – electric guitar, vibraphone, autoharp

"May It Be On Offer"

- Rosali – electric guitar, acoustic guitar, vocals
- Ted Bois – synthesizer
- Kevin Donahue – drums, percussion
- David Nance – bass guitar
- James Schroeder – electric guitar

Technical personnel

- Alex Bingham – additional engineering
- Asia Harman – cover photography
- JJ Idt – engineering
- Rosali Middleman – mixing, production
- William Schmiechen – illustration
- James Schroeder – engineering, mixing, production
- Mikey Young – mastering

== Charts ==
Bite Down entered the UK Americana Chart, peaking at #32.

== See also ==
- 2024 in American music
- List of 2024 albums
