= Bittersweet Demons =

Studio album by the Murlocs
- Released: 25 June 2021
- Genre: Garage rock; glam rock; power pop; garage soul
- Length: 42:37
- Label: Flightless

The Murlocs chronology
Manic Candid Episode (2019)	Bittersweet Demons (2021)	Rapscallion (2022)

Singles from Bittersweet Demons
- 1. "Francesca" Released: 19 April 2021; 2. "Eating at You" Released: 17 May 2021; 3. "Bittersweet Demons" Released: 2 June 2021

Bittersweet Demons is the fifth studio album by Australian garage rock band the Murlocs, released on 25 June 2021 by Flightless Records. The album has been described as garage rock, glam rock, power pop, and garage soul.

== Background ==
The album is about the "people who leave a profound imprint on our lives". In general, the album has been noted for being highly reflective on human nature. When asked about this, frontman Ambrose Kenny-Smith stated:

The whole concept for this record was to try and write about my family, friends and any other old acquaintances that made an impact on me throughout my life. I moved three times growing up so each song reflects on different parts of that journey. It doesn’t get much more personal than this! I hope everyone feels at just as much at peace as I do when listening to it.

== Reception ==
Writing for Trouble Juice, Josseph Massaro enjoyed the record, calling the soundscapes on the record Harry Nilsson-like and how the record revitalises the band's fuzzy and distorted stylings. Carmine Basilicata of Pancakes and Whiskey also enjoyed the record, feeling that it was a breath of fresh air "in which every song sounds like the one that came before it". He also stated that the record would fit in with bands such as the Strokes and Yeah Yeah Yeahs, seeing the album being played on a "modern college radio station". He went on to mention a possible Rolling Stones influence. Post-Trash's Conor Lochrie also enjoyed the album, stating that it "courses on a long and winding path, each turn infectious and melodious. It's a soulful and rowdy record, rollicking and ballsy". Christopher Anthony of The Fire Note stated that the entire record gave a "memorable foot tapping pace" and also said the cohesion and experience of the record elevates it to one of the best by the band.

== Track listing ==
Bittersweet Demon track listing
No.	Title	Length
1.	"Francesca"	2:42
2.	"Dangerous Nature"	3:26
3.	"Bittersweet Demons"	3:37
4.	"Eating at You"	3:23
5.	"Illuminate the Shade"	3:53
6.	"No Self Control"	4:00
7.	"Skyrocket"	4:35
8.	"Skewiff"	4:30
9.	"Limerence"	3:26
10.	"Blue Eyed Runner"	4:01
11.	"Misinterpreted"	4:59
Total length:		42:37

== Credits ==
=== Personnel ===
- Ambrose Kenny-Smith: lead vocals, harmonica, acoustic guitar, keyboards, piano, percussion
- Callum Shortal: lead guitar, rhythm guitar, twelve-string guitar
- Cook Craig: bass guitar; keyboards and wine glasses on “No Self Control”
- Tim Karmouche: keyboards, synthesizer, piano
- Matt Blach: drums, percussion, backing vocals

Additional musicians

- John Lee: mellotron and percussion on “Misinterpreted”
- Sam Joseph: pedal steel guitar on “Eating At You”

=== Production ===
- Timi Dunn: recording except for “Illuminate the Shade” & “Skyrocket”
- Stu Mackenzie: recording on “Illuminate the Shade” & “Skyrocket”
- Sam Joseph: additional recording on “Francesca”, “Bittersweet Demons” & “Eating At You”
- The Murlocs: additional recording
- Jasper Jolley: additional recording
- Jesse Williams: additional recording
- John Lee: mixing
- Joe Carra: mastering
- Julian Hocking: artwork, design
- Jamie Wdziekonski: band photography
- Louise Kenny, Damien Shortal, Christine Hergstrom, Deborah Karmouche, Leonie Blach (the members' mothers): baby photography

== Charts ==
Chart performance for Bittersweet Demon
Chart (2021)	Peak position
Australian Albums (ARIA)	6
