= Pain Olympics =

Studio album by Crack Cloud
- Released: July 17, 2020
- Recorded: 2017–2019
- Genres: Post-rock, post-punk, new wave, experimental, art-punk, industrial hip hop
- Length: 29:11
- Label: Meat Machine
- Producer: Crack Cloud

Crack Cloud chronology
Crack Cloud (2018)	Pain Olympics (2020)	Tough Baby (2022)

Singles from Pain Olympics
- 1. "The Next Fix" Released: May 3, 2019; 2. "Ouster Stew" Released: May 13, 2020; 3. "Tunnel Vision" Released: June 25, 2020; 4. "Favour Your Fortune" Released: October 16, 2020

Pain Olympics is the debut studio album by Canadian musical collective, Crack Cloud, released July 17, 2020 via Meat Machine Records. The album was preceded by three singles, "The Next Fix", "Ouster Stew" and "Tunnel Vision" released between May 2019 until June 2020 respectively.

== Promotion and release ==
Prior to any album announcement, Crack Cloud kicked off the campaign for Pain Olympics, with the release of the album's first single, The Next Fix on May 3, 2019, along with the self-produced music video, a series of stylishly, interconnected vignettes focused on each individual member of the collective functioning through daily life in the city, amid struggles with drug use, mental health and depression. The group's drummer and lead vocalist, Zach Choy explained the single was made as tribute "to remember the people we’ve lost to suicide and drug overdose". The single was cryptically referred to as "Part One of the PAIN OLYMPICS series" upon its release.

The following month, the group premiered the music video for Crackin Up, a commercially unreleased, b-side on June 27, 2019. Described by the collective as "a stylized portrait" of consumerism within a "predatory media landscape", the video touches on those themes in an abstract and surrealist nature, while featuring brief pop culture references to the Dark web, Malcolm X, The Seventh Seal and Muchmusic. Despite being referred to as "Part Two" of the series, Crackin Up ultimately would be left off of the album and treated as a video only, non-album single. Following those two singles, new music would not be released from the collective until the following year.

On May 13, 2020, the group announced and confirmed the album's title as "Pain Olympics", alongside the release of the official second and lead single, Ouster Stew. The album's third single, Tunnel Vision was released June 25, 2020, along with an ambitious CGI music video produced by the collective.

Pain Olympics was released July 17, 2020. Due to the COVID-19 global pandemic, no touring could be done to promote the album. The fourth and final single, Favour Your Fortune was released October 16, 2020 with an overwhelmingly, dystopian music video, starring Cree-Canadian professional skateboarder, Joe Buffalo.

== Critical reception ==
At Metacritic, which assigns a normalized rating out of 100 to reviews from mainstream critics, Pain Olympics received an average score of 87 from 8 reviews, indicating "universal acclaim".

In his review for NME, Will Richards praised the album, saying it's "a disturbing, joyous, cataclysmic listen that travels from claustrophobia and fear into wide-eyed expressions of joy." Richards also commends the group's ability to channel and reflect their shared experience with drug rehabilitation and harm reduction throughout the entirety of the project, further stating, "it also feels like an extension of their work on the frontline against Canada's opioid crisis, and a testament to the power of strength in numbers

== Track listing ==
No.	Title	Length
1.	"Post Truth (Birth of a Nation)"	5:41
2.	"Bastard Basket"	4:29
3.	"Somethings Gotta Give"	2:04
4.	"The Next Fix"	3:24
5.	"Favour Your Fortune"	2:06
6.	"Ouster Stew"	2:21
7.	"Tunnel Vision"	4:37
8.	"Angel Dust (Eternal Peace)"	4:26
Total length:		29:11

== Personnel ==
- Zack Choy – lead vocals, drums, percussion, production, writing, lyrics,
- Mohammad Ali Sharar – guitar, backing vocals, production, visual formatting, editing
- Will Choy – lead guitar, bass, backing vocals
- Bryce Cloghesy – saxophone, guitar
- Jon Varley – lead guitar, backing vocals
- Noah Varley – bass
- Paulina Cantoral – vocals (track 1)
- Missy Donaldson – vocals (track 1,4,8)
- Caton Diab – trumpet, vocals (track 1,4)
- Clarice Scop – strings (track 1)
- Kristina Hedlund – strings (track 1)
- David Novotny – guitar, lap steel, flute (track 1)
- Mackenzie Cruse – vocals (track 1,4)
- Kelsie Hjorliefson – vocals (track 4)
- Crystal Coleman – vocals (track 4)
- Jesse Atkey – vocals (track 1,4)
- E.H Alley – voice (track 5,8)
- Garnet Aroynk – bass (track 3)
- Eden Solomon – choreographer
- Scotty Alva – assistant choreographer
- Isabelle Anderson – assistant choreographer
- Kaylee Cumming – assistant choreographer
- Hannah McCuley – assistant choreographer
- Jing Wang – assistant choreographer

Technical

- Nicolas Dirksen – arrangements, engineering, additional mixing (track 1,5), effects, strings, woodwinds, additional percussion, additional synths, organs
- John Paul Stewart – engineering, mixing, effects, processing
- Christian Wright – mastering
- Jennilee Marigomen – photography
- Marc Gabbana – cover art
- Wei Huang – lettering
