= The Murlocs =

Australian band

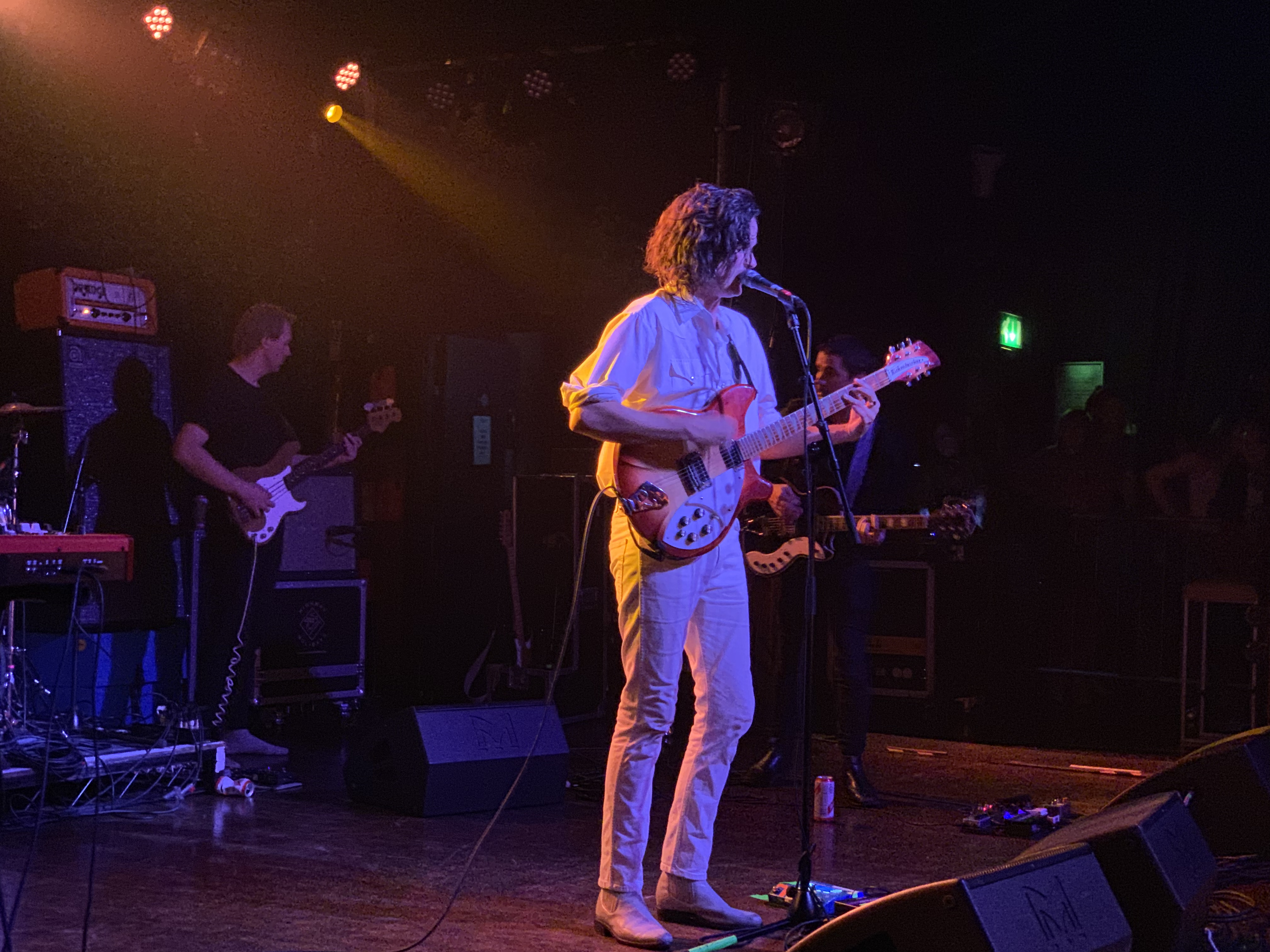
- The Murlocs performing in London, 2019

Background information
- Origin: Melbourne, Victoria, Australia
- Genres: Psychedelic rock; garage rock; R&B
- Years active: 2010–present
- Labels: Flightless; ATO; p(doom)
- Members: Ambrose Kenny-Smith; Cal Shortal; Cook Craig; Tim Karmouche; Matt Blach
- Website: unclemurl.com

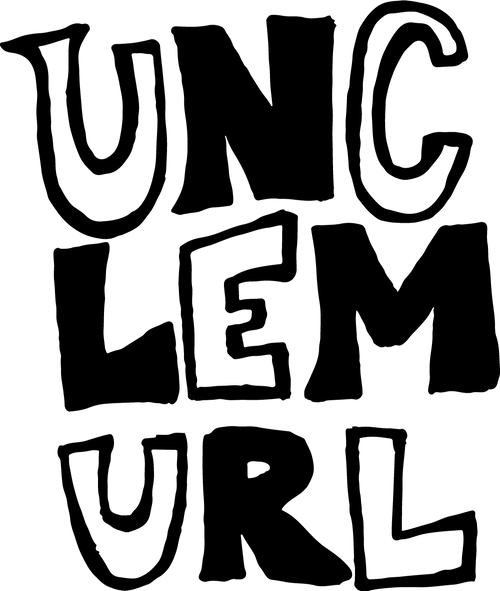
Logo of the Murlocs' website

The Murlocs are an Australian rock band from Melbourne. They are composed of Ambrose Kenny-Smith on vocals and harmonica, Cal Shortal on guitar, Cook Craig on bass guitar, Tim Karmouche on keyboards, and Matt Blach on drums. They were formed in 2010 by Ambrose Kenny-Smith, and they have released seven studio albums since then. Their sound is a mix of rock and R&B, with the distorted harmonica of Kenny-Smith providing the band with a distinctive sound.

== History ==
The Murlocs were formed in 2010 in Ocean Grove, Geelong, Australia. According to Ambrose Kenny-Smith, their name was derived from the game World of Warcraft. In Kenny-Smith's words, "A murloc ... is a mythical creature.....originating from the game World of Warcraft.". They released their first EP, their self-titled project The Murlocs, in March 2012. This was followed closely by another EP, Tee Pee, in August 2012. Their first full studio album, Loopholes, was released in 2014 under the Flightless Records label. Halfway through the recording of the album, the laptop containing the tracks was stolen, and the band had to re-record most of it. In 2015, The Murlocs joined King Gizzard & the Lizard Wizard for all three stops of the inaugural Gizzfest festival tour. They would play at the annual festival every year until 2018, when the festival went on hiatus.

Their second album, Young Blindness, was released in March 2016. The album's second single, "Rolling On", was released in September 2015. "Rolling On" was a breakthrough for The Murlocs, and the song continues to be one of their most popular to date. Young Blindness was followed in 2017 by The Murlocs' third album, Old Locomotive, which included the singles "Noble Soldier" and "Oblivion". Old Locomotive gave the band its first chart appearance when it debuted at #15 on the ARIA album charts. In another first, the band toured Europe for the first time in late 2017.

The band's fourth studio album, Manic Candid Episode, was released in March 2019. Kenny-Smith described this album as "...definitely the most lush thing we have done". The album's earned the band its second chart appearance when it reached #16 on the ARIA album charts. In support of the album, the band began their first headlining tour of the United States in April 2019. Ohtis accompanied them for this tour as the opening act.

On 20 April 2021, they announced their fifth studio album Bittersweet Demons, due 25 June 2021, and released the first single "Francesca". About the single, Kenny-Smith said that “it's probably the most positive, feel-good song we’ve ever done. It's also the closest we’ve ever come to having an 80s phase.” In a YouTube Q&A, the Kenny-Smith stated that Bittersweet Demons is "very personal to me as every song is based upon different places I grew up and certain family members and friends that are close". Drummer Matt Blach also said that they "...have experimented a lot more with this album than others."

Also on 20 April, they released vinyl re-pressings of Loopholes and the Tee Pee and Self Titled EPs, the latter of which had never been released on vinyl before.

On 12 July 2022, the band announced their sixth album, Rapscallion, which was released on 16 September 2022.

On 22 March 2023, the band announced their seventh studio album, "Calm Ya Farm", which was released on 19 May 2023.

On 28 May 2024, the band announced the live album "Live at The Teragram Ballroom", which was released on 7 June 2024.

== Members ==
Current

- Ambrose Kenny-Smith – lead vocals, harmonica, percussion, keyboards, guitar (2011–present)
- Cal Shortal – guitar, backing vocals (2011–present)
- Matt Blach – drums, backing vocals (2011–present)
- Cook Craig – bass, guitar (2013–present)
- Tim Karmouche – keyboards, guitar, vocals (2016–present)

Former

- Jamie Harmer – guitar, backing vocals (2011–2013)
- Andrew Crossley – bass guitar (2011–2013)
- Lalic Milinkovic – guitar, backing vocals (2015–2016)

== Discography ==
=== Studio albums ===
List of studio albums, with selected details and chart positions
Title	Details	Peak chart positions
Title	Details	AUS
Loopholes	Released: 17 April 2014; Label: Flightless (FLT-010); Formats: CD, LP, digital download, streaming	—
Young Blindness	Released: 18 March 2016; Label: Flightless (FLT-020); Formats: CD, LP, digital download, streaming	—
Old Locomotive	Released: 28 July 2017; Label: Flightless (FLT-034); Formats: LP, digital download, streaming	15
Manic Candid Episode	Released: 22 March 2019; Label: Flightless (FLT-046); Formats: LP, digital download, streaming	16
Bittersweet Demons	Released: 25 June 2021; Label: Flightless (FLT-064); Formats: CD, LP, digital download, streaming	6
Rapscallion	Released: 16 September 2022; Label: ATO; Formats: CD, LP, digital download, streaming	82
Calm Ya Farm	Released: 19 May 2023; Label: ATO; Formats: CD, LP, digital download, streaming	67

=== Live albums ===
List of live albums, with selected details
Title	Details	Peak chart positions
Title	Details	AUS
Live At the Teragram Ballroom	Released: 7 June 2024; Label: ATO; Formats: CD, LP, digital download, streaming	

=== Extended plays ===
List of extended plays, with selected details
Title	Details
The Murlocs	Released: 1 March 2012; Label: The Murlocs; Formats: CD, digital download
Tee Pee	Released: 7 August 2012; Label: Flightless (FLT-002); Formats: CD, digital download

=== Music videos ===
List of music videos, showing year released and director
Title	Year	Album	Director(s)
"Tee Pee"	2012	Tee Pee EP	Danny Wild
"Bogan Grove"	2013	Tee Pee EP	Jason Galea and Greg Holden
"Rattle The Chain"	2013	Loopholes	Jason Galea
"Space Cadet"	2013	Loopholes	Jason Galea
"Paranoid Joy"	2014	Loopholes	Jason Galea
"Loopholes"	2014	Loopholes	Jason Galea
"Adolescence"	2015	Young Blindness	Jason Galea
"Rolling On"	2015	Young Blindness	Danny Wild
"Compensation"	2016	Young Blindness	Jason Galea
"Young Blindness"	2016	Young Blindness	Dr D Foothead
"Unknown Disease"	2016	Young Blindness	Alex McLaren and Sean McAnulty
"Wolf Creep"	2016	Young Blindness	Alex McLaren and Jason Galea
"Noble Soldier"	2017	Old Locomotive	Alex McLaren
"Oblivion"	2017	Old Locomotive	Alex McLaren
"Snake In The Grass"	2017	Old Locomotive	Alex McLaren and Sean McAnulty
"Comfort Zone"	2019	Manic Candid Episode	John Angus Stewart
"Withstand"	2019	Manic Candid Episode	Alex McLaren
"What if?"	2019	Manic Candid Episode	John Angus Stewart
"Francesca"	2021	Bittersweet Demons	Alex McLaren
"Eating At You"	2021	Bittersweet Demons	John Angus Stewart
"Bittersweet Demons"	2021	Bittersweet Demons	Guy Tyzack
"Skyrocket"	2021	Bittersweet Demons	Jake Armstrong
"Virgin Criminal"	2022	Rapscallion	Guy Tyzack
"Compos Mentis"	2022	Rapscallion	Guy Tyzack
"Bellarine Ballerina"	2022	Rapscallion	Guy Tyzack
"Living Under A Rock" (Live at the Forum)	2022	—N/a	Jason Kendirian
"Initiative"	2023	Calm Ya Farm	Guy Tyzack
"Undone And Unashamed"	2023	Calm Ya Farm	Jack Rule and Matt Wallace
"Queen Pinky"	2023	Calm Ya Farm	Hayden Somerville

== Awards and nominations ==
Year	Nominee / work	Award	Result	Ref.
Music Victoria Awards of 2015	The Murlocs	Best Regional Act	Nominated	
Music Victoria Awards of 2016	The Murlocs	Best Regional Act	Nominated	
