= Look Over the Wall, See the Sky =

Studio album by John Francis Flynn
- Released: 10 November 2023
- Genre: Irish folk music
- Length: 42:35
- Language: English
- Label: River Lea

John Francis Flynn chronology
I Would Not Live Always (2021)	Look Over the Wall, See the Sky (2023)

"I was drawn to 'I Wish I Was A Mole In The Ground' at the time in Dublin when traditional music was centred round this pub The Cobblestone, and it was under threat. This venue was the real hope of our scene. It's beyond just a pub, it's a social space where people can learn traditional music or the Irish language or even learn French dancing."

— Flynn on including the lead single on Look Over the Wall, See the Sky

Look Over the Wall, See the Sky is a 2023 studio album by Irish folk musician John Francis Flynn. The release was announced in September 2023 and preceded by the single "Mole in the Ground". This collection of traditional Irish folk music, related to the culture of Dublin and an exploration of Irish identity and has received positive reviews from critics.

== Reception ==
In Hot Press, Will Russell rated this album 9 out of 10, calling it "a profound album that demands repeated exploration" and a feature interview by Jess Murray included the characterization that this album is "dripping in Flynn's originality and creativity". Siobhán Long of Irish Times scored this release 4 out of 5 stars, calling this album and stating that "the nocturnal, muzzy soundscape builds on what he conjured on his solo debut" and "Flynn's reach is both wide and deep, embracing this time around two songs from Ewan MacColl's catalogue and layering fresh meaning on both". In a feature interview for Loud and Quiet, Ollie Rankine describes Flynn as "being one of the genre's most recent offshoots and contending with hordes of different song variations before him, Flynn still succeeds in finding his niche" with his focus on a Dublin-specific sound and stated that this album "offers an abstract fantasy, a fleeting glimpse of what could exist when all that is truly Irish remains". Neil Spencer of The Observer rated this album 4 out of 5 stars, calling it a "blast from the past" with "songs emerge from walls of growling guitars and doomy drones and disappear into distorted electronica". At The Quietus, Patrick Clarke included Look Over the Wall, See the Sky among the best music of October, stating that the album rewards repeated listening with a sense of cohesion, and it was chosen as Album of the Week on its eventual release. Editors at Stereogum also chose Look Over the Wall, See the Sky as the Album of the Week, with critic Ryan Leas remarking that the music is "wracked with sadness, but makes it vivid, immersive, and strikingly beautiful".

Editors at The Quietus chose it for the fifth best album of 2023. Editors at The Fader chose this as the 31st best album of the year. In The Atlantic, it was ranked 10th best of 2023. Look Over the Wall, See the Sky was shortlisted for the RTÉ Choice Music Prize Irish Album of the Year 2023.

== Track listing ==
1. "The Zoological Gardens" – 3:15
2. "Mole in the Ground" – 3:52
3. "Willie Crotty" – 6:47
4. "Kitty" – 7:20
5. "The Seasons" – 4:25
6. "Within a Mile of Dublin" – 5:41
7. "The Lag Song" – 6:25
8. "Dirty Old Town" – 4:50

== Personnel ==
- John Francis Flynn – guitar, tin whistle, vocals

== See also ==
- List of 2023 albums
