= Brown Wimpenny =

British folk band

- Genre: Folk
- Label: Broadside Hacks

Brown Wimpenny is an English folk band based in Manchester.

Their debut album 'Long Live Brown Wimpenny' was released on the 5th June 2026, via the label Broadside Hacks. The band has 11 members and features 11 different instruments, including mandolin; five-string banjo; tenor banjo; acoustic guitar; drums; accordion; double bass; violin; flute; whistle and the musical saw.
