= Uwade =

Nigerian-American singer (born 2000/2001)

- Born: Uwade Akhere; 2000/2001 (age 25–26); Edo State, Nigeria
- Origin: Charlotte, North Carolina
- Genre: Indie folk
- Years active: 2021–present
- Label: Thirty Tigers
- Website: uwade.com

Uwade Akhere (born 2000/2001), known mononymously as Uwade, is a Nigerian-American indie folk singer-songwriter.

== History ==
Uwade was born in Edo State, Nigeria, and moved with her family to Charlotte, North Carolina, when she was 2-years-old.

Uwade attended Columbia University, graduating in 2021. She released her first recording the same year, titled The Man Who Sees Tomorrow/Lodarore. In 2022, she released a new song titled "Do You See The Light Around Me?" In 2025, Uwade released her debut album, Florilegium, on Thirty Tigers. she toured the US to promote the album, performing at small venues from April to July 2025, then travelled to England in August to perform at the End of the Road Festival.

== Discography ==
Studio albums

- Florilegium (2025, Thirty Tigers)
