= Tough Baby =

Studio album by Crack Cloud
- Released: September 16, 2022
- Recorded: 2020–2022
- Genres: Post-rock, post-punk, art rock, new wave, indie rock, baroque pop experimental
- Labels: Crack Cloud Media Studio; Meat Machine
- Producer: Crack Cloud

Crack Cloud chronology
| Pain Olympics (2020) | Tough Baby (2022) | Red Mile (2024) |

Singles from Tough Baby
- 1. "Please Yourself" Released: May 11, 2022; 2. "Tough Baby" Released: July 6, 2022; 3. "Costly Engineered Illusion" Released: September 1, 2022

Tough Baby is the second studio album by Canadian musical collective, Crack Cloud, released on September 16, 2022, via the group's independent imprint, Crack Cloud Media Studio, and Meat Machine Records. The album was preceded by three singles, "Please Yourself", "Tough Baby" and "Costly Engineered Illusion" released May 11, July 8, and September 1. 2022, respectively.

== Promotion and release ==
On April 1, 2022, Crack Cloud released a teaser trailer via social media, featuring a brief cameo by Canadian singer/songwriter, Mac Demarco as a clapper loader, alongside members of the collective on a soundstage as a film crew documenting a teenage girl and a group of patients in hospital gowns watching a mysterious television program in a partially-constructed set decorated and made to appear like the girl's bedroom.

The trailer was later revealed to be the music video for the album's first single, "Please Yourself" which was released on May 11, 2022, alongside the album's announcement. On July 6, 2022, the group released the album's self-titled second single and music video, consisting of a narrative focused around a young, adolescent girl who daydreams of living amongst a group of Troglodytes (also portrayed by members of the collective).

The album's third single, Costly Engineered Illusion was released September 1. 2022.

== Track listing ==
| No. | Title | Length |
|---|---|---|
| 1. | "Danny's Message" | 2:07 |
| 2. | "The Politician" | 2:09 |
| 3. | "Costly Engineered Illusion" | 3:19 |
| 4. | "Please Yourself" | 4:51 |
| 5. | "Virtuous Industry" | 2:54 |
| 6. | "Tough Baby" | 4:34 |
| 7. | "Criminal" | 6:11 |
| 8. | "115 At Night" | 3:01 |
| 9. | "Afterthought (Sukhi's Prayer)" | 5:18 |
| 10. | "Crackin Up" | 2:56 |

== Personnel ==
- Zack Rain Hope Choy – lead vocals, drums, percussion, violin, mellotron, production, synthesizer, keyboards, design, album concept, writing, composition, lyrics, processing, arrangements, additional mixing
- Nicolas Dirksen – strings, organ, guitar, synths, drum machine, bass, vocals, additional engineering, additional mixing, additional lyrics (track 6)
- Eve Adams – vocals
- Jesse Atkey – saxophone
- Sukhi Aulakh – voice (track 9)
- Will Hael Choy – guitar, vocals
- Danny Choy – voice (track 1), masks (featured on the album cover)
- Bryce Cloghesy – saxophone, guitar, synths, vocals
- Mackenzie Cruse – vocals, graphic design
- Justin Defries – percussion
- Caton Diab – trumpet, bowed guitar, flute
- Aleem Khan – piano, vocals
- Jouvaughan Meek – voice
- Garnet Aroynk MMuhammmed – guitar, bass, vocals
- Sage Aroynk Muhammed – percussion, vocals
- Daniel Robertson – keys, synths, mellotron, guitar, vocals
- Mohammad Ali Sharar – guitar, vocals, graphic design, album concept
- Camryn Sproule – percussion, vocals

Additional musicians

- Tabitha Brasso-Ernst – vocals
- Greta Das – trumpet
- Kira Fondse – vocals
- Alison Gorman – flugelhorn
- Jacob Grammit – vocals
- Brian Harding – trombone
- Marc Lindy – tuba
- Steve Maddock – vocals
- Carman J. Price – vocals
- Taka Shimojima – vocals
- Lucy Smith – vocals
- Risa Takahashi – vocals

Technical

- John Paul Stewart – engineering, additional mixing, processing, synths, guitar, bass, vocals
- Be Hussey – additional engineering
- Paul Corley – mixing
- Lisa Choy – cover model
- Heba Kadry – mastering
- Fahim Kassam – cover photography
- Amy Lowe – diorama (featured on album insert)
- Shilo Preshyon – additional engineering
- Nathan Salon – additional mixing
- Curtis Windover – album layout
