= Red Mile (album) =

Studio album by Crack Cloud
- Released: July 26, 2024
- Recorded: 2023–2024
- Genres: Post-rock, post-punk, art rock, new wave, baroque pop, world music, blues, experimental
- Length: 45:09
- Labels: Jagjaguwar, Big Love
- Producer: Crack Cloud

Crack Cloud chronology
Tough Baby (2022)	Red Mile (2024)	Peace and Purpose (2026)

Singles from Red Mile
- 1. "Blue Kite" Released: May 15, 2024; 2. "The Medium" Released: June 18, 2024

Alternative cover
- "Japan Edition" variant

Red Mile is the third studio album by Canadian musical collective, Crack Cloud, released July 26, 2024, through American independent label, Jagjagwuar. The album was preceded by the singles, "Blue Kite" and "The Medium" released on May 15 and June 18. 2024, respectively.

While the album's title, colloquially refers to a stretch of road in primary vocalist/songwriter and drummer, Zack Choy's hometown of Calgary, Alberta, that served as a public gathering place for fans of the city's NHL hockey team during the 2004 Stanley Cup Finals, thematically, it touches on themes of existentialism, consumerism, genealogy, self-reflection and pop culture through a deconstructive lens. Recording for the album took place between Calgary and Joshua Tree, California in the Mojave Desert.

== Critical reception ==
Red Mile was favourably received upon its release. Review aggregator, Metacritic, which assigns a normalized rating out of 100 to reviews from mainstream critics, the album received an average score of 80 from 6 reviews, indicating "generally favorable reviews".

Writing for SPIN, Margaret Farrell offered a very positive review of the album, opining "Red Mile is a disarmingly earnest exercise in philosophizing" and further praising it as the group's "ultimate rock odyssey—a combination of epic poem-leaning lyrics with spacious, anthemic compositions that recall everyone from Gary Numan and early '80s David Bowie to Broken Social Scene"

Matt the Raven of Under the Radar also gives a fairly positive review, stating the album "lays out with an offbeat synergy of melodic weirdness and unconventional dynamism", but warns the juxtaposition "could be an acquired taste for some". He further implores "But be forewarned, pressing skip is at your own risk and will result in missing out on expanding your musical palette with some terrifically playful and energetic indie rock" and ensures "those that do will quickly realize the crisp underbelly of gnarly guitars, keyboards, and electronics—mixed with upbeat and curious rhythms while retaining the band's signature peculiarity—make Red Mile worth hearing".

Joe Creely of The Skinny offered a more pedantically mixed review of the album, due to the group's sound shifting from their early post-punk roots into a territory with more "pop sensibilities" stating the album "sounds like a 1976 punk band's third record, where raw fury ceases, replaced by flirtations with pianos and optimism". While Creely commends the songwriting and highlights blues rock effort, Ballad of Billy for its "really enjoyable surly barroom energy", he ultimately criticizes Red Mile as "an experiment in straight-forwardness".

== Track listing ==
All tracks are written by Zack Choy, Aleem Khan and Bryce Cloghesy unless otherwise specified.

No.	Title	Writer(s)	Length
1.	"Crack of Life"		5:50
2.	"The Medium"	Choy; Khan; Cloghesy; Emma Acs	4:36
3.	"Blue Kite"		6:10
4.	"Lack of Lack"		4:42
5.	"Epitaph"		4:29
6.	"I Am (I was)"		5:33
7.	"Ballad of Billy"	Choy; Khan; Cloghesy; Acs; Will Choy; Jared Drake	5:24
8.	"Lost on the Red Mile"	Choy; Khan; Cloghesy; Acs	8:15
Total length:			45:09

"Dinked Edition" Bonus tracks
No.	Title	Length
1.	"Wretched Ways"	3:55
2.	"Down The Drain"	5:15
Total length:		9:10

== Personnel ==
Crack Cloud

- Zack Choy – lead vocals, drums, percussion, piano, marimba, mellotron, synthesizer, organ, production, writing, composition, lyrics, processing, arrangements, additional mixing, additional engineering, video editing, string arrangements
- Emma Acs – vocals, writing (tracks 2, 7, 8)
- Eve Adams – vocals
- Will Choy – guitar, vocals, writing (track 7)
- Bryce Cloghesy – guitar, acoustic guitar, synths, vocals, bass, piano, organ, synths, percussion, vocals, engineering, arrangements
- Jared Drake – bass, backing vocals, writing (track 7)
- Aleem Khan – piano, vocals, electric guitar, bass, novachord, organ, harmonium, mellotron, harpsichord, wurlitzer, synths, additional engineering, additional string arrangements (track 8), writing
- Nat Philipps – saxophone

Additional musicians

- Ellie Consta – violin
- Silvia Fioretti – vocals
- Victoria Hamblett – vocals
- Will Harvey – viola
- Venetia Jollands – violin
- Arthur Sajas – vocals
- Gamaliel Traynor – cello, string transcription

Technical

- Isabelle Anderson – additional photography
- Craig O'Brien – cover photography
- Spela Cedilnik – additional photography
- Eric Cinnamon – additional engineering
- Daniel Fox – mixing assistant
- Greg Kalbi – mastering
- Syd Kemp – additional engineering
- Aidan Pontarini – album layout, artwork, visual concept, formatting, graphic design
- Daniel Schlett – mixing
- John Paul Stewart – tape processing, vocals
- Beck Vogelgesang – cover model
