= Girl and Girl =

Australian rock band

- Origin: Gold Coast, Queensland, Australia
- Genres: Indie rock; garage rock revival
- Years active: 2020–present
- Label: Sub Pop/Virgin
- Members: Kai James; Sebastian Ward; Fraser Bell; Aunt Liss
- Past members: Coby Williams
- Website: Girl and Girl

Girl and Girl are a four-piece Australian rock band from Brisbane. They were formed in the Gold Coast. The current lineup includes Kai James on lead vocals, Sebastian Ward on lead guitar and Aunt Liss (Melissa James) on drums. Fraser Bell later joined on bass guitar. Girl and Girl were signed by Sub Pop in 2023, and their debut album was released on May 24, 2024.

== History ==
Vocalist Kai James and guitarist Jayden Williams began cramming for their upcoming music exam in James' mother's garage. One day, James' Aunt Liss (Melissa James) joined them on drums after walking her dog. Girl and Girl were formed in Gold Coast, in 2020, by James, Williams, Liss and Jayden's brother Coby Williams on bass guitar. The quartet's early singles were "Shame Its not Now" and "White Tiles" (April 2021). Their first extended play, A Typical Friday Night (Shame, Sex And Misery), was released in September alongside a 10" released by Colossus Records, together with a music video for its single, "Doctor Marten". Initially intended as a temporary arrangement, Aunt Liss became a permanent member of the band.

Their second EP is the six-track Divorce, which was issued independently in September 2022. Coby co-wrote "Dance Now" with James but had left the band before the EP was released. He was replaced by Fraser Bell on bass guitar. In 2023 the band were signed by Sub Pop and released the single "All I See", and re-released "Dance Now". Their second EP was re-released in June, which was extended to eight tracks, as Divorce+. On 24 May 2024 Girl and Girl released their debut album, Call a Doctor. In February 2024 they issued its lead single, "Hello".

== Discography ==
=== Albums ===
- Call a Doctor (2024)

=== Extended plays ===
- A Typical Friday Night (Shame, Sex and Misery) (October 2021) Colossus Records (0001)
- Divorce (September 2022) Independent/Suitcase (GAG2000)
