= Plan 76 =

2025 EP by The Orchestra (For Now)

EP by The Orchestra (For Now)
- Released: 31 October 2025
- Studio: Chale Abbey Studios, The Church Studios
- Genre: Progressive rock; post-rock
- Length: 24:41
- Label: Self-published
- Producer: Baláza Altsach

The Orchestra (For Now) chronology
Plan 75 (2025)	Plan 76 (2025)

Singles from Plan 76
- 1. "Hattrick" Released: 5 September 2025; 2. "Deplore You / Farmers Market" Released: 9 October 2025

Plan 76 is an extended play by English progressive rock band The Orchestra (For Now). It was self-published by the band and released on 31 October 2025. Two singles were released in promotion of the EP; "Hattrick" on 5 September and "Deplore You / Farmers Market" on 9 October. The EP was received positively by critics, who described it as a solid evolution of the sound from their debut, Plan 75.

== Background ==
The Orchestra (For Now) is a seven-piece band from London consisting of vocalist and pianist Joseph Scarisbrick, cellist Erin Snape, guitarists Bill Bickerstaff and Neil Thomson, violinist Lingling Bao-Smith, bassist Millie Kirby and drummer Charlie Hancock. The band released their debut EP, Plan 75 on 28 March 2025. The band's sound has been described as "London prog".

== Musical style ==
Plan 76 has been described as progressive rock and post-rock. Critics noted the similarities between the EP's sound and the sound of other acts from the Windmill scene such as Black Country, New Road and Geordie Greep. The band noted the EP "completes the first story we wanted to tell", and acts as a continuation of the themes and sounds on their debut. Much of the music on Plan 76 frequently switches between fast-paced and more intimate sections; one critic said that the band "band thrive on extremes" in this way.

The opening track "Impatient" begins with a "mystic ambience" before morphing into a "undulating landscape of boisterous guitar" and "almost uncomfortably unpredictable movement". One critic compared its "aggression and bravado" to early My Chemical Romance, and "the subtlety" of Radiohead and Bark Psychosis. "Hattrick" contains a mix of "fiery tunnels of rage-laced guitar", piano and string sections. A review for Dork noted the song as the best example of the group's "London prog" sound. Another critic noted how the song's lyrics "[lent] yet more credence to the band's more poetic side". According to DIY, "Amsterdam" is particularly reminiscent of Radiohead, making use of soundscapes and piano sections. The track also makes use of the melody from "Wake Robin" from Plan 75. "The Administration" is a somber track with "orchestral flourishes". Influences of "Human Sadness" by The Voidz, "Paranoid Android" by Radiohead and some of the Black Midi catalogue were noted by Alex Taylor of Still Listening Magazine. The closing track "Deplore You / Farmers Market" was described as "wobbly and withdrawn", made up of softer instrumentation to imply "intimacy and minimalism". The track becomes faster-paced and intense as it progresses. The band described it as a "front-facing reckoning that explores ambition and fatigue, and the strains of failure and minor success".

== Release ==
Plan 76 was released on 31 October 2025, being self-published by the band. In an interview before its release, the band described both it and Plan 75 as "one body of work", noting they "[tie] up the first phase of our band". Two singles for the album were released: "Hattrick", which was released on 5 September, and "Deplore You / Farmers Market", which was released on 9 October. The music video for "Hattrick" was directed by Joe Starrs. The band toured in support of the album, starting on 13 November in Sheffield and ending on 4 December in Cambridge.

== Reception ==
Professional ratings
Review scores
Source	Rating
DIY	4.5/5 stars
Dork	4.5/5

Plan 76 was received positively by critics. Reviewing the EP for DIY, Kyle Roczniak called the music "playful, theatrical, gigantic post-rock". Teddy Maloney of So Young Magazine noted how the EP was "testing the boundaries" of the sound of its own genre. In a piece for Still Listening Magazine, Alex Taylor called the EP a "satisfying continuation from their last project", though noted the band's live performances sounded better. Louder Than War writer James Kilkenny called the EP a "sonically successful evolution" of their debut, though added it was not as "odd or consistently fascinating" as the former. Writing for Dork, Jordan Ellison described the EP as "messy, ambitious and never less than gripping".

== Track listing ==
Plan 76 track listing
No.	Title	Length
1.	"Impatient"	3:09
2.	"Hattrick"	5:40
3.	"Amsterdam"	4:33
4.	"The Administration"	5:37
5.	"Deplore You / Farmers Market"	5:42
Total length:		24:41

== Personnel ==
Credits adapted from Apple Music and liner notes.

- Joseph Scarisbrick – composition, writing
- Bill Bickerstaff – composition, cover design, art direction
- Erin Snape – composition
- Neil Thomson – composition
- Charlie Hancock – composition
- Lingling Bao-Smith – composition
- Isobel Nisbett – composition
- Baláza Altsach – production, mixing
- James Poucher – engineering
- David Granshaw – assistant engineering
- Jason Mitchell – mastering
