= Katy J Pearson =

English indie pop musician

- Born: 1996 (age 29–30); Swindon, England
- Genres: Pop rock
- Years active: 2015-present
- Label: Heavenly Recordings
- Formerly of: Ardyn
- Website: katyjpearsonmusic.com

Katy J Pearson is an English indie pop musician based in Bristol, England. DIY Magazine referred to her music as "earthy, Americana-tinged sound" citing influences including "idol" Kate Bush and PJ Harvey.

== Early life ==
She was born in Swindon, Wiltshire, England and raised in Cirencester, Gloucestershire.

== Career ==
She started out in the band Ardyn with her brother Rob, initially under the name Kitten And Bear. She signed a management contract at 15 and joined National Anthem at age 19 releasing their debut EP titled Universe in September 2015.

Life recording for a major London label did not suit Pearson however, who instead says the band "went to shit". She told DIY Magazine that she was "happy" to have been released from the major label, instead moving back to Bristol from London.

Pearson released her debut single "Tonight" in 2019 through Heavenly Recordings. In 2020, Pearson issued her debut album, Return, also on Heavenly Recordings. In 2022, Pearson released her second album, Sound of the Morning. The album received positive reviews.

For Record Store Day 2024, she released a 9 track EP The Wicker Man with covers of songs from the film. The EP features collaborations with Broadside Hacks, Drug Store Romeos, Sarah Meth, Orbury Common, Bert Ussher, H. Hawkline, and remixes by Richard Norris and Stone Club.

In 2024 Pearson featured on the song "When The Laughter Stops" by Yard Act.

On 20 September 2024 she released her third album, Someday, Now which involved collaborators including Nathan Jenkins (Bullion) as well as previous collaborators Joel Burton (Broadside Hacks), Huw Evans (H. Hawkline) and Davey Newington (Boy Azooga).

== Influences ==
Pearson cites Kate Bush as "her number-one idol", an influence formed on "yearly camping trips to Devon" where she would "spy on (Bush's) cliffside house with her dad". She also takes influence from Stevie Nicks, Broadcast, The Stranglers, and Beck.

She is an "avid reader" and cites Vashti Bunyan's Wayward as an "inspiration".

She says Vaughan Williams's The Lark Ascending is a song she always listens to in the morning.

Fellow West Country musician PJ Harvey is a friend and mentor to Pearson.

== Personal life ==
Her brother Rob is also a musician, initially playing with Katy in the band Ardyn. He has appeared on stage with her during her solo career.

== Discography ==
=== Albums ===
- Return (2020)
- Sound of the Morning (2022)
- Someday, Now (2024)

=== Singles and EPs ===
- Tonight (2019)
- Hey You (2020)
- Take Back The Radio (2020)
- Fix Me Up (2020)
- Something Real (2020)
- Take Back The Radio (Flying Mojito Bros Refrito) (2020)
- Tonight (Field Recording) 2021
- Return (Remixes) (2021)
- Tonight (Roxanne Roll Remix) (2021)
- Willie of Winsbury (2021)
- Talk Over Town (2022)
- Game Of Cards (2022)
- Alligator (2022)
- Float (2022)
- Willow's Song (2023)
- Willow's Song (feat. Broadside Hacks) (2023)
- Fire Leap (2023)
- Katy J Pearson & Friends Present Songs From The Wicker Man (2023)
- Those Goodbyes (2024)
- Sky (2024)
- Maybe (2024)
- Save Me (Radio Mix) (2024)
