= Jake Xerxes Fussell =

American singer and guitarist (born 1981)

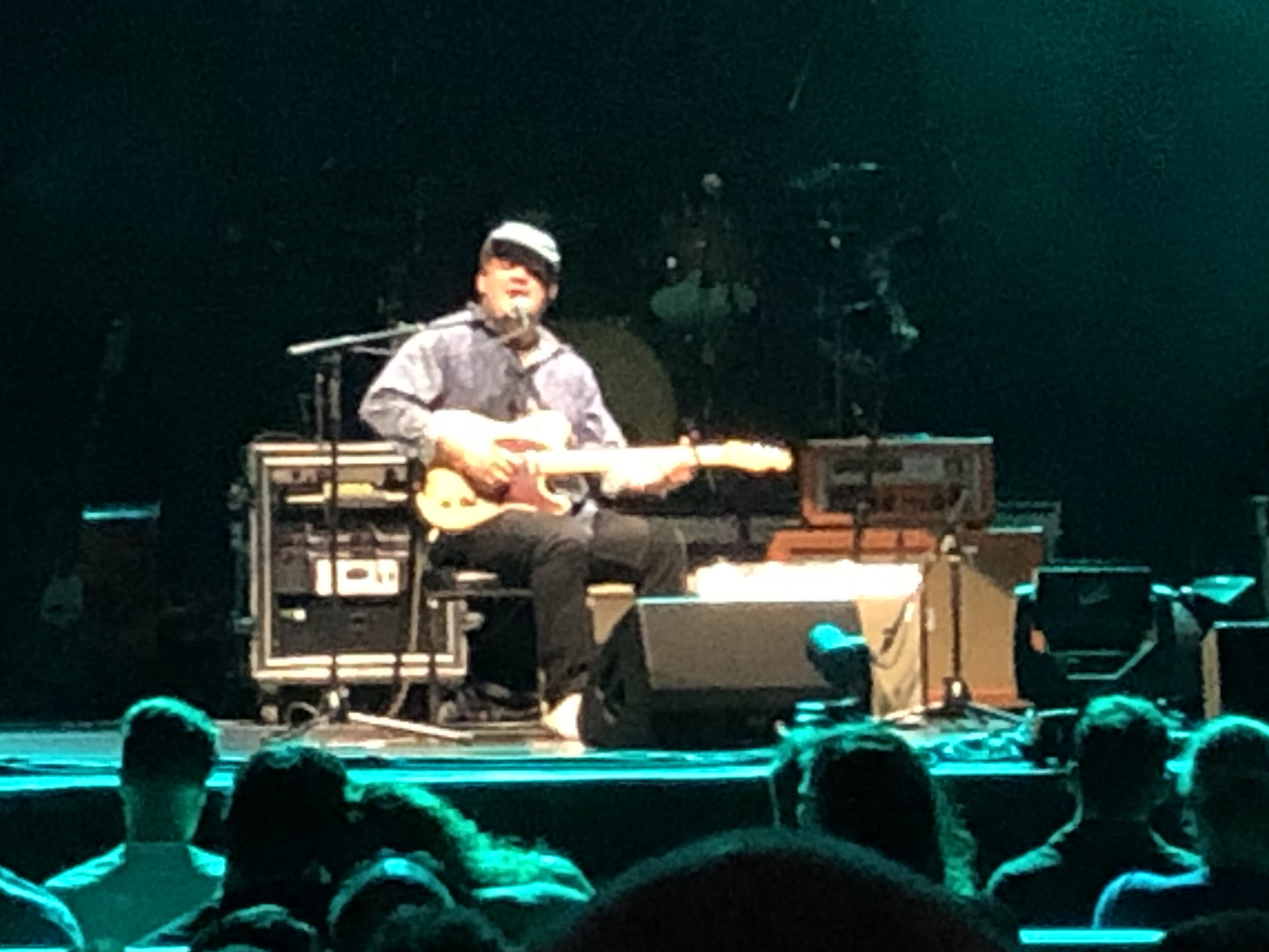
- Jake Xerxes Fussell performing at Wolf Trap in August 2022

Background information
- Born: November 9, 1981 (age 44); Columbus, Georgia, U.S.
- Occupation: Singer
- Instrument: Guitar
- Website: jakexerxesfussell.com

Jake Xerxes Fussell (born 1981, in Columbus, Georgia) is an American singer and guitarist who plays folk and blues music, with a focus on traditional Southern folk songs.

== Background ==
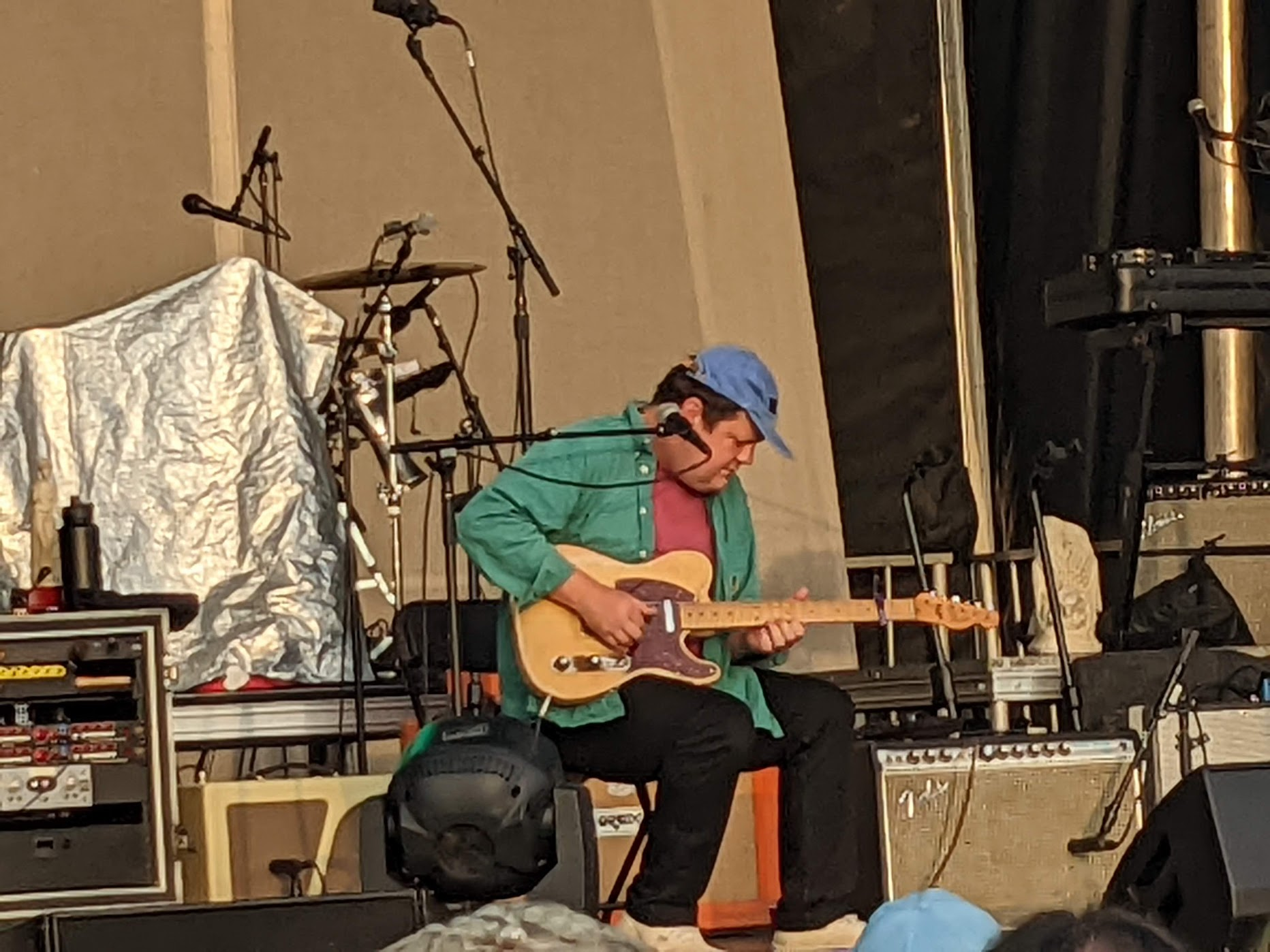
Fussell opening for The Decemberists at Surly Brewing Company in Minneapolis.

Fussell was raised in Columbus, Georgia, the son of Fred C. Fussell, a folklorist, curator, and photographer. As a teenager Jake began playing and studying with elder musicians in the Chattahoochee Valley, apprenticing with Piedmont blues legend Precious Bryant, with whom he toured and recorded. He joined a Phenix City, Alabama, country band who were students of Jimmie Tarlton of Darby and Tarlton, and accompanied Etta Baker in concert in North Carolina.

Before releasing his debut album, Fussell recorded vernacular Southern Music in the field with music historian George Mitchell and Grammy Award-winning folklorist Art Rosenbaum. He often leverages his knowledge of traditional American folk music in his own work, for example, by adapting the cry of a 19th Century fishmonger for his song "The River St. John’s".

Fussell has appeared on A Prairie Home Companion. He toured in the U.S. as an opening act for Wilco, Bill Callahan, and The Decemberists.

== Music ==
In 2015, Fussell released his debut self-titled album composed entirely of adapted folk and blues songs. William Tyler produced the album and contributed features on the guitar and organ. Chris Scruggs recorded features on steel guitar, bass, and mandolin, and Hoot Hester on the fiddle.

In 2017, Fussell released his second album, What in the Natural World. Writing for The New Yorker, Amanda Petrusich named What in the Natural World to her "My Ten Best Albums of 2017".

Fussell released his third album in January 2019. In a review of his 2019 album Out of Sight, Pitchfork magazine noted,

Musicians like Jake Xerxes Fussell are nearly as rare nowadays as the material he performs. “All songs are traditional & in the public domain,” reads the sole composition credit on Out of Sight, Fussell’s often-transcendent third album. Put another way: Each of these nine songs survived the great folk-pop copyright round-up of the 1950s and ’60s (and beyond), when publishers hunted down and claimed untold numbers of “traditional” melodies as their own.

In 2022, Fussell released his fourth album, Good and Green Again. Produced by James Elkington, the album is a combination of traditional song adaptations and original compositions.

Fussell's fifth album, When I'm Called, was announced on April 17, 2024, along with the release of the album's first single, "Going to Georgia". The album, produced by Elkington, was released on July 12, 2024, on Fat Possum Records. The album features nine songs, "some of them traditional [and] some not so traditional."

== Discography ==
Albums
Title	Date of Release	Label
Jake Xerxes Fussell	January 27, 2015	Paradise of Bachelors
What in the Natural World	March 31, 2017	Paradise of Bachelors
Out of Sight	June 7, 2019	Paradise of Bachelors
Good and Green Again	January 21, 2022	Paradise of Bachelors
When I'm Called	July 12, 2024	Fat Possum Records
Rebuilding (Original Motion Picture Soundtrack)	November 14, 2025	Fat Possum Records
The Old Beloved Path	September 18, 2026	Fat Possum Records

Singles
Title	Date of Release
"Have You Ever Seen Peaches Growing on a Sweet Potato Vine?"	January 19, 2017
"Furniture Man"	February 9, 2017
"Jump for Joy"	March 10, 2017
"The River St. Johns"	April 3, 2019
"Michael Was Hearty"	April 25, 2019
"Oh Captain" / "Three Ravens"	May 23, 2019
"Copper Kettle"	February 5, 2021
"Hills of Mexico"	March 5, 2021
"Love Farewell"	October 29, 2021
"Going to Georgia"	April 17, 2024
