= Broadside Hacks =

British folk music collective and record label

- Origin: London, England
- Genres: Folk, contemporary folk
- Years active: 2020–present
- Label: Broadside Hacks Recordings

Broadside Hacks is a London-based folk music collective, independent record label, and live music promoter founded in 2020 by Campbell Baum. The group is associated with the 2020s British folk revival and focuses on programming, performing, and releasing traditional folk music. The collective features a rotating roster of musicians and was the subject of the 2022 documentary film The Broadside Hack.

== History ==
Broadside Hacks was formed in early 2020 by Campbell Baum, bassist for the London indie band Sorry.

The collective takes its name from broadside ballads (inexpensive, single-sheet prints of traditional songs) and focuses on interpreting compositions with no known authors. The collective's fluid house band, sometimes referred to as Maudlin, is led by Baum and has included contributions from artists such as Naima Bock (formerly of Goat Girl), Aga Ujma, Daragh Lynch (of Lankum), and Katy J Pearson.

== Label and releases ==
The collective operates the independent record label Broadside Hacks Recordings. In June 2021, the label released its debut project, Our Singing Tradition Vol. 1, a limited-edition cassette compilation of unaccompanied, a cappella songs recorded by various musicians.

This was followed in September 2021 by Songs Without Authors Vol. 1, a double-LP compilation of traditional folk songs reworked by various contemporary artists. The Guardian named the record its "Folk Album of the Month".

The label has subsequently released music for other emerging artists in the contemporary folk scene, including Goblin Band, Spitzer Space Telescope, Brown Wimpenny, and Milkweed.

== Live events and media ==
As a live promoter, Broadside Hacks programmes a regular London folk club onboard Theatreship in Canary Wharf. The collective has organised multi-day tribute events and retrospective concerts for folk institutions such as Les Cousins, as well as figures including Martin Carthy, Mike Heron, and The Pogues.

In 2022, the group was the subject of The Broadside Hack, a short documentary directed by Crispin Parry and funded by Arts Council England. The film premiered at the South by Southwest (SXSW) festival and subsequently screened at the Glastonbury Festival.

== Discography ==
=== Compilations ===
- Our Singing Tradition Vol. 1 (Cassette, June 2021)
- Songs Without Authors Vol. 1 (Double LP, September 2021)
