= John Francis Flynn =

Irish singer and musician

- Genres: Irish folk music
- Occupations: Singer; songwriter
- Years active: 2021–present

John Francis Flynn is an Irish singer and multi-instrumentalist whose work traverses the worlds of traditional and contemporary folk music. He is a founder member of the traditional Irish folk band Skippers' Alley. His solo work combines traditional material with influences from the worlds of post-punk, electronica, improvisation and contemporary music.

He released his solo debut I Would Not Live Always in 2021. It received widespread favourable reviews and was named Folk Album of the year in The Guardian newspaper. It spent 11 weeks on the Folk Albums Chart in the United Kingdom reaching number 8.

His second album Look Over the Wall, See the Sky was released in 2023 and also garnered very favourable reviews. In The Quietus Albums of the Year 2023 it was rated 5th best album of 2023. In the Nialler9 blog it was rated 6th best album of 2023. In the Loud and Quiet magazine it was rated 9th best album of 2023; in The Atlantic it was rated number 10. Editors at The Fader chose it as the 31st best album of the year. It was shortlisted for both the RTÉ Choice Prize Irish Album of the Year 2023 and the Best Folk Album in the 6th RTÉ Radio 1 Folk Awards.

In the 2021 RTÉ Radio 1 Folk Awards he won Best Folk Singer and Best Emerging Artist.

He was featured in the award-winning 2022 documentary film North Circular, directed by Luke McManus.

== Discography ==
- I Would Not Live Always, 2021 (River Lea Recordings)
- Look Over the Wall, See the Sky, 2023 (River Lea Recordings)
