= Lutalo =

American indie rock musician

Lutalo Jones, better known as just Lutalo, is an American indie rock musician. To date, Lutalo has released two EPs. In 2022, Lutalo released their first EP, Once Now, Then Again. In 2023, Lutalo released second EP titled Again. In addition to releasing solo music, Lutalo has also collaborated on one song each with the musicians Claud and Lomelda.

In 2024, Lutalo released their debut album, titled The Academy.

Lutalo has toured with Katy Kirby, Claud, Andy Shauf, and Adrianne Lenker.

== Personal life ==
Lutalo is cousins with musician Adrianne Lenker of the band Big Thief.
