= Jealous of the Birds =

Northern Ireland band

- Origin: Northern Ireland
- Genres: Indie Pop; Indie Folk; Indie Rock
- Years active: 2015–present
- Labels: Canvasback
- Members: Naomi Hamilton
- Website: www.jealousofthebirdsmusic.com

Naomi Hamilton, known professionally as Jealous of the Birds, is a singer-songwriter from Northern Ireland whose songs are in the indie pop, indie folk, and indie rock genres.

== History ==
Naomi Hamilton grew up in Portadown, Northern Ireland. She studied English and creative writing at Queens University Belfast in Belfast, and her writing background is reflected in the lyrics of her songs. In addition to her work as Jealous of the Birds, Hamilton is also a painter, visual artist, and podcast host.

While Hamilton had played guitar since she was twelve years old and written poetry since her teen years, she only began writing and recording her own music around late 2014 and early 2015. Jealous of the Birds released its first EP, Capricorn, in 2015, and its first single, "Goji Berry Sunset," in 2016, while Naomi Hamilton was still at university. It was around this time that Hamilton began working with manager and producer Declan Legge, with whom she has worked on most of her Jealous of the Birds projects. Jealous of the Birds released its first full-length album, Parma Violets, in 2017. At that time, Jealous of the Birds was also picked up by US label Canvasback, and The Moths Of What I Want Will Eat Me In My Sleep was Hamilton's major label debut EP.

At the end of 2019, Hamilton spent two weeks in Lisbon, Portugal working on the second Jealous of the Birds album. She recorded the album in London, UK in February and March 2020, and Peninsula was released in September 2020. Hamilton began working on Jealous of the Birds' next album in 2021 and recorded most of the album in Declan Legge's home studio. That album, Hinterland, was released in 2023.

Jealous of the Birds was artist-in-residence at the Cathedral Quarter Arts Festival in Belfast in 2016, and the band's song "Dandelion" was featured on the soundtrack of the 2020 limited drama series Normal People.

== Discography ==
- Capricorn (EP) (2016)
- Parma Violets (2016)
- Love is a Crow (EP) (2017)
- The Moths of What I Want Will Eat Me in My Sleep (EP) (2018)
- Wisdom Teeth (EP) (2019)
- Peninsula (2020)
- Hinterland (2023)
