= Thank God We Left the Garden =

Studio album by Jeffrey Martin
- Released: November 3, 2023
- Recorded: Late 2022
- Studio: Martin's backyard, Portland, Oregon
- Genre: Folk; Americana
- Length: 38:29
- Label: Fluff and Gravy
- Producer: Jon Neufeld

Jeffrey Martin chronology
One Go Around (2017)	Thank God We Left the Garden (2023)

Thank God We Left the Garden is the fourth studio album by American musician Jeffrey Martin, released on November 3, 2023, through Fluff and Gravy. The album is Martin's first in six years, following 2017's One Go Around. It was recorded in Portland, Oregon with producer Jon Neufeld and received acclaim from critics.

== Recording ==
Martin, a former schoolteacher, wrote and recorded the album in a "shack" in his backyard in Portland, Oregon in late 2022. He eventually worked on them with the help of producer Jon Neufeld and session musicians.

== Critical reception ==
Professional ratings
Aggregate scores
Source	Rating
Metacritic	88/100
Review scores
Source	Rating
Mojo	4/5 stars
Paste	8.2/10
Uncut	4.5/5 stars

Thank God We Left the Garden received a score of 88 out of 100 on review aggregator Metacritic based on four critics' reviews, indicating "universal acclaim". Mojo called it "reminiscent of early Nathaniel Rateliff and John Moreland, and prime John Prine" and wrote that "there's no reason here to doubt Martin might one day eclipse them all". Paste's Eric R. Danton called it "a stunner of a record, with songs that are stark in their simplicity, yet emotionally rich in a way that can catch your breath in your throat or leave your eyes suddenly damp". Allan Jones of Uncut stated that it "so often sounds like something you might have heard for the first time in an early-'70s bedsit" and is "starker yet, 11 songs [...] occasionally embellished by co-producer Jon Neufeld's crepuscular electric guitar, but more usually unadorned", calling it "Martin's most mesmerising, brilliant album". Jim Hynes of Glide Magazine felt that Martin "instills his songs with heartfelt emotion that is more apparent the more one listens" and "the less-is-more approach, despite the aforementioned lack of melodic hooks, works well due to Martin's intimate connection with these songs".

== Track listing ==
Thank God We Left the Garden track listing
No.	Title	Length
1.	"Lost Dog"	2:59
2.	"Garden"	3:02
3.	"Quiet Man"	3:39
4.	"Red Station Wagon"	4:14
5.	"Paper Crown"	3:26
6.	"There Is a Treasure"	3:47
7.	"All My Love"	2:35
8.	"Daylight"	3:44
9.	"I Didn't Know"	3:55
10.	"Sculptor"	3:29
11.	"Walking"	3:39
Total length:		38:29
