= Jana Horn =

American folk musician

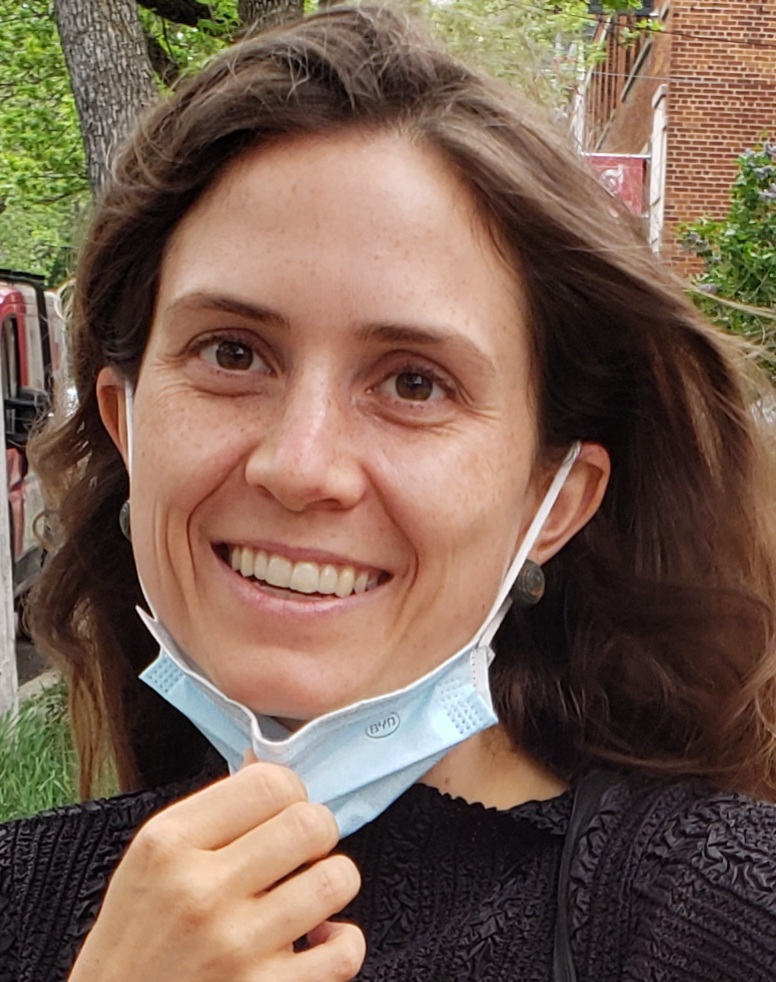
- Horn in May 2022
- Born: Glen Rose, Texas, U.S.
- Occupations: Musician; professor
- Employer: University of Virginia
- Musical career
- Genres: Folk; screamo
- Label: No Quarter
- Website: www.janahorn.com

Jana Horn is an American folk musician based in Austin, Texas.

== Background ==
Jana Horn grew up in Glen Rose, Texas. She is a teacher and a fiction writer in the MFA program at the University of Virginia in Charlottesville. She became interested in Christian screamo music while growing up in a small town in Texas and she attended screamo concerts in Dallas. Prior to releasing her debut album, she recorded an album that was not released. Her debut album, Optimism, was initially self-released, before No Quarter, a Philadelphia record label, chose to give the album a wider release.

In 2023, Horn announced her sophomore album, The Window Is the Dream, which released on April 7 of that year. She released her self-titled third album on January 16, 2026, receiving positive reviews.

== Discography ==
=== Studio albums ===
- Optimism (No Quarter, 2020)
- The Window Is the Dream (No Quarter, 2023)
- Jana Horn (No Quarter, 2026)
