= Mermaid Chunky =

English experimental musical duo

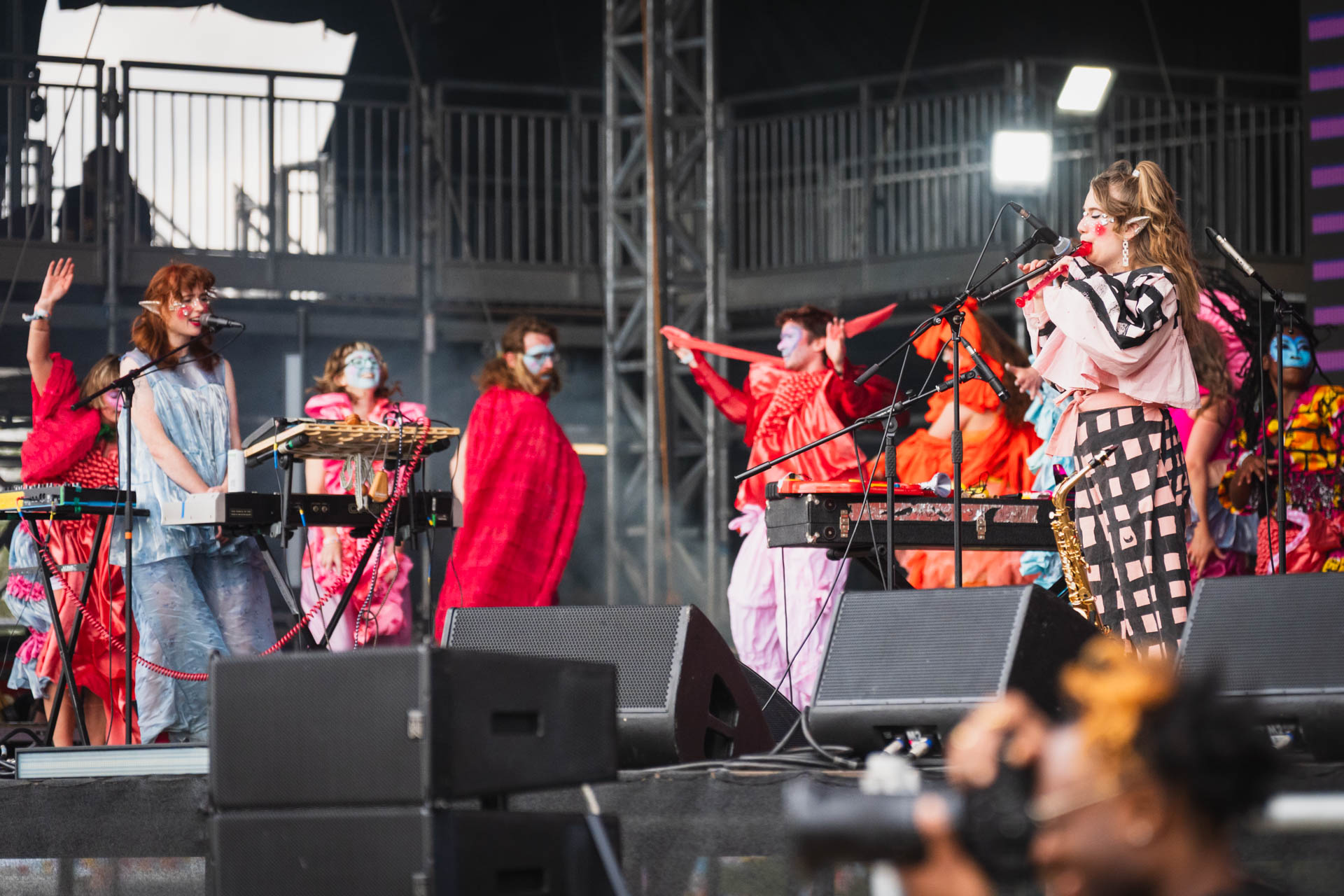
- Mermaid Chunky performing at Wide Awake music festival in 2025

Background information
- Origin: London, England
- Genres: Experimental music; avant-folk; dance-pop; electronic music
- Years active: 2017–present
- Labels: DFA Records; Faith and Industry
- Members: Moina Moin; Freya Tate
- Website: www.mermaidchunky.org.uk

Mermaid Chunky is a London-based duo, Moina Moin and Freya Tate, signed to DFA Records. Moin plays saxophone, Tate plays keyboards and drives the drum machine. Pitchfork named their second LP, Slif Slaf Slof one of the "10 New Albums You Should Listen To Now" in 2024 and NME called Slif Slaf Slof "brilliantly eccentric, funny and inventive avant-pop." Metal Magazine describes their music as an "eclectic storm of electro, jazz, experimental pop, and folk."

== History ==
Tate and Moin are both from Stroud, Gloucestershire. They met as teenagers at Strouds Valleys Artspace. They played their first show together as Mermaid Chunky in 2017 at a poetry night in Stroud.

Mermaid Chunky's EP VEST, was released November 6th 2020 on Faith & Industry, produced by Capitol K. When LCD Soundsystem’s James Murphy heard the track "Friends" in a coffee shop in Brooklyn, he Shazam'd the song. Murphy emailed Mermaid Chunky, saying "You've restored my faith in music." Soon after, they were signed to Murphy's label, DFA Records. In 2022, he asked Mermaid Chunky to open for LCD Soundsystem at Brixton Academy.

Slif Slaf Slof was released September 13, 2024.

== Discography ==
=== Albums ===
- slif slaf slof (DFA Records, 2024)

=== EPs ===
- VEST (Faith and Industry, 2020)
