= Tara Clerkin Trio =

English alternative rock band

- Origin: Bristol, United Kingdom
- Members: Tara Clerkin, Sunny Joe Paradisos, Patrick Benjamin

Tara Clerkin Trio is a United Kingdom based band formed in Bristol in 2020. The band's music has been described as jazz rock, avant-rock and trip hop.

== History ==
The band originally formed in Bristol as the Tara Clerkin Band in 2020, originally as a collective of musicians with eight members. The current lineup of the band as a trio comprises vocalist Tara Clerkin, drummer Sunny Joe Paradisos and keyboard player Patrick Benjamin. A succession of extended play releases followed, including In Spring in 2021 and On The Turning Ground in 2023. Pitchfork praised On The Turning Ground as "slow, airy music that nonetheless teems with life", writing that "every new idea seems like a natural progression".

Following the release of their debut, the band moved to Liverpool and London following financial difficulty, and writing and recording of a second album was undertaken sporadically during international touring. Their second album, Somewhere Good, was released on 5 June 2026 on World of Echo. The Guardian praised the album as a "step in a new direction" due to its "more structured songwriting and storytelling". Describing the album as "inventive and restrained", and naming its title track 'Best New Track', Pitchfork praised Somewhere Good as a "triumph of restrained invention", commending its fusion of instrumental and experimental features. Allmusic wrote that the album was "arty, dubby, melodic, head-nodding", and a "perfect mixture of sound and tunes that's meditative and invigorating in equal doses".

== Members ==
- Tara Clerkin - vocalist, guitar, keyboards, clarinet
- Sunny Joe Paradisos - drums, cello, guitar, occasional vocalist
- Patrick Benjamin - keyboards, melodica

== Discography ==
=== Albums ===
- Tara Clerkin Trio (2020)
- Somewhere Good (2026)

=== Extended plays ===
- In Spring (2021)
- On the Turning Ground (2023)
