= The Orchestra (For Now) =

English rock band

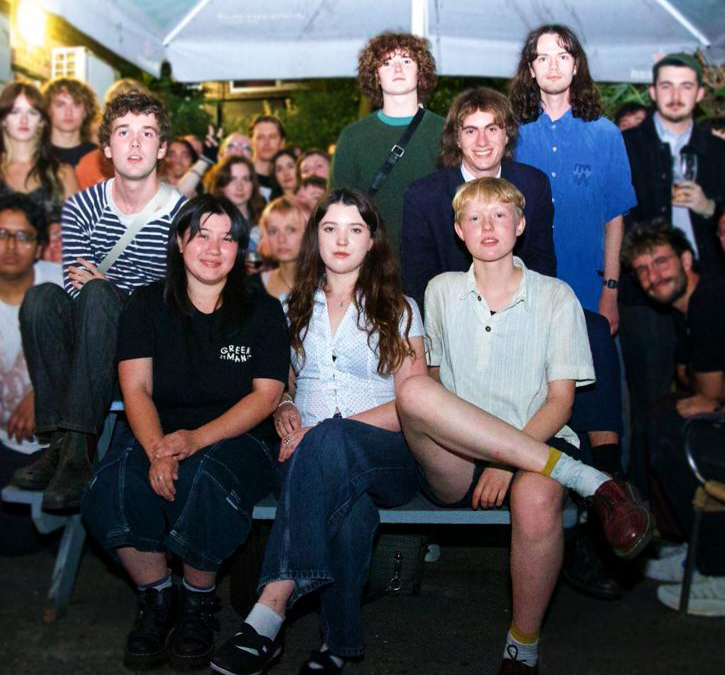
- Left to Right: Bickerstaff, Bao-Smith, Kirby, Hancock, Scarisbrick, Snape, Thomson

Background information
- Origin: London, United Kingdom
- Genres: Art rock; progressive rock
- Years active: 2023–present
- Members: Joseph Scarisbrick; Neil Thomson; Bill Bickerstaff; Lingling Bao-Smith; Erin Snape; Millie Kirby; Charlie Hancock
- Past members: Isobel Nisbett
- Website: theorchestrafornow.com

The Orchestra (For Now) (sometimes abbreviated as TO(FN)) is an English progressive rock band based in London. Formed in early 2023, the band consists of lead singer and keyboardist Joseph (Joe) Scarisbrick, guitarists Neil Thomson and Bill Bickerstaff, violinist Lingling Bao-Smith, bassist Millie Kirby, cellist Erin Snape, and drummer Charlie Hancock. They regularly perform around London and the UK and released three singles before releasing their debut EP Plan 75 on 28 March 2025. Their most recent EP, Plan 76 was released in October 2025, with the first single, Hattrick, released on 3 September 2025. They are also set to release an album in 2026.

== History ==
The Orchestra (For Now) was formed in early 2023. The band made various live performances and won the 2024 Green Man Rising competition at the Green Man Festival, before releasing their debut single "Wake Robin" in November 2024. In 2025, they followed up with the release of "Skins" in late January, as well as "The Strip" in March. The three released singles were part of the four-song EP Plan 75, released on 28 March 2025 independently.

Their follow-up EP titled Plan 76 released on 31 October of the same year.

== Musical style and influences ==
The Orchestra (For Now) has been described as art rock or progressive rock and has been compared to fellow Windmill scene artists like Black Country, New Road and Geordie Greep, or groups like Arcade Fire.

== Members ==
- Joseph (Joe) Scarisbrick – vocals, keyboards
- Neil Thomson – guitar
- Bill Bickerstaff – guitar
- Lingling Bao-Smith – violin
- Millie Kirby – bass
- Erin Snape – cello
- Charlie Hancock – drums

== Discography ==
=== EPs ===
- Plan 75 (2025)
- Plan 76 (2025)

=== Singles ===
- "Wake Robin" (2024)
- "Skins" (2025)
- "The Strip" (2025)
- ”Hattrick” (2025)
- "Deplore You / Farmers Market" (2025)
