= Rosali =

American indie rock musician

Rosali A. Middleman (born May 29, 1982) better known as just Rosali, is an American indie rock singer-songwriter originally from Philadelphia. She is currently signed to Merge Records.

== History ==
Rosali released her first album in 2016 titled Out of Love. She released her second album, Trouble Anyway, in 2018 on Scissor Tail and Spinster, and in 2021 her third album, No Medium, on Spinster Records.

Rosali moved from Philadelphia to North Carolina in 2021. In 2024 she announced her fourth album and first with Merge Records, whom she had signed to the previous year, titled Bite Down.
