= Ohtis =

American country rock band

- Origin: Normal, Illinois, United States
- Genres: Country, country rock, alternative country
- Years active: c. 2004 – present
- Members: Sam Swinson; Adam Pressley; Nate Hahn

Ohtis is an American country rock band from Normal, Illinois. Their debut album Curve of Earth was released in 2019.

== History ==
Singer-songwriter Sam Swinson formed the band with Adam Pressley while in high school; they were later joined by multi-instrumentalist Nate Hahn. Despite initial popularity in and around Normal, Illinois, and several do-it-yourself releases, Swinson's heroin addiction and recovery caused the band to disintegrate. The band were subsequently mostly inactive from 2009 to 2016.

== If This Country Had a Heart, That’s Where I Was Born (2008) ==
If This Country Had a Heart, That’s Where I Was Born was self-released in 2008. Reviewing the album for Tiny Mix Tapes, Laura Witkowski likened it to "Paul Simon putting his spin on late-’70s-era Talking Heads backed by a commune of accomplished hippie musicians", noted its theme of religious uncertainty, and described Swinson's songwriting as that of "a deep thinker with a sharp, wry wit."

== Curve of Earth (2019) ==
Ohtis' debut album Curve of Earth was released on March 29, 2019, 15 years after the band was first formed. The songs were written while Swinson was in drug rehabilitation and during relapse, and recorded after Swinson contacted Pressley and Hahn as part of a twelve-step program. The album also draws on religious themes, inspired by Swinson's early life spent in a cult.

Chris Conaton of PopMatters described the album as characterised by "an unusual musical variety in the songs that makes it an intriguing listening experience" and praised "Swinson's raw honesty and the band's musical creativity". Marcy Donelson of AllMusic noted that despite the album's subject matter, its "lyrics are delivered throughout the album with a relaxed, affable tone befitting the group's twangy, sauntering indie rock", and characterized the album as "30-minute set that plays like a character-centered short story."

In a five-star review in NME, Jordan Bassett wrote that "These eight country songs course with pain and regret, although there’s a strong seam of hope and optimism too." Bassett praised "Black Blood" and concluded that the album "contain[s] the chaos of addiction, crystallising mistakes into something much more beautiful. The result is extraordinary and life-affirming."

George O'Brien of London in Stereo wrote that the album "paints a picture of hope, through examining the bleakest moments", while Woody Delaney of Loud and Quiet described it as having an "aura that’s melancholic yet comforting". Reviewing the album in The Line of Best Fit, Evan Lilly wrote that "Curve of Earth is an intimate recollection that's meant to illuminate and heal our spirits, reminding us that even in dark times, light somehow manages to always pass through."
