= Suitcase Records =

Australian vinyl pressing plant

Suitcase Records is a vinyl record pressing facility in Brisbane, Queensland, Australia. It is one of only three in Australia.

Suitcase Records was founded by Neil and Kathy Wilson in 2021 after they saw the growth and demand for vinyl in Australia. At the time, there were only two vinyl record pressing plants in Australia, so the Wilsons started the third Australian pressing plant, based in Pinkenba, Brisbane. They began operating in July 2022, with the first record pressed being Girl and Girl's EP 'Divorce'.

Suitcase Records uses Optimum Mastering to cut their lacquers, and Stamper Discs to create their stampers. Currently, they use an Allegro Line II machine, which allows them to press one record every 30 seconds.
