= Green Man Festival =

Major music festival held annually in Wales

Coordinates: 51.869°N 3.172°W

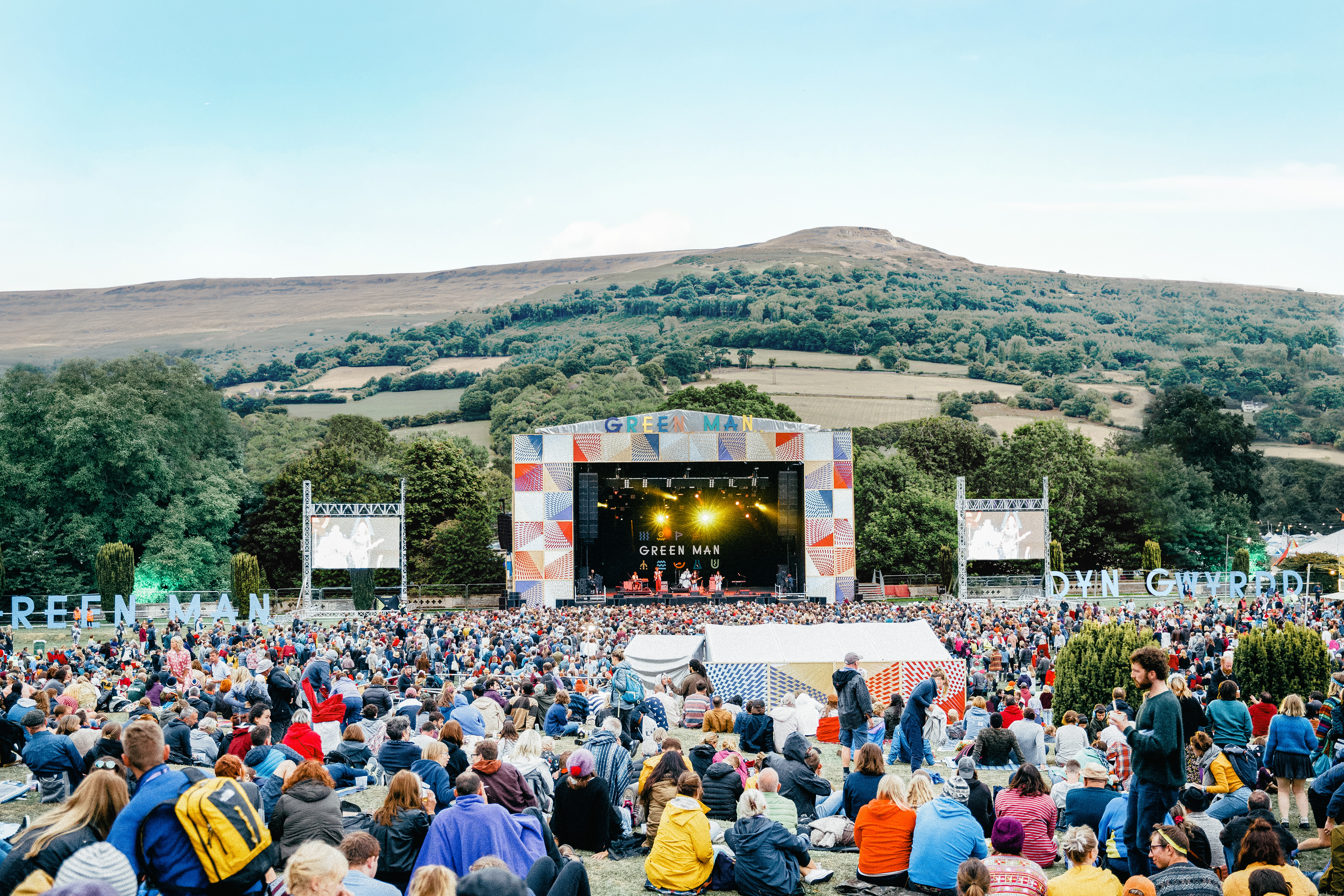
- Green Man Festival, Mountain Stage, 2018
- Genre: Folk music / Psychedelia / Indie / Dance / World Music / Americana / Electronica
- Locations: Near Crickhowell, Powys, Wales
- Years active: 2003–present
- Website: www.greenman.net

The Green Man Festival is an independent music, science and arts festival held annually in mid-August in the Brecon Beacons, Wales. Green Man has evolved into a 25,000 capacity week long event, showcasing predominantly live music (in particular alternative, indie, rock, folk, dance and Americana). The festival site is divided into 10 areas, hosting literature, film, comedy, science, theatre, wellness and family acts.

The festival has expanded into other ventures, including setting up a charitable wing called the Green Man Trust and launching its own beer range called Green Man Growler. Previous headliners have included Kraftwerk, Bicep, Laura Marling, Van Morrison, Michael Kiwanuka, PJ Harvey, Fontaines D.C, Devo, Fleet Foxes and First Aid Kit.

== Awards and press ==
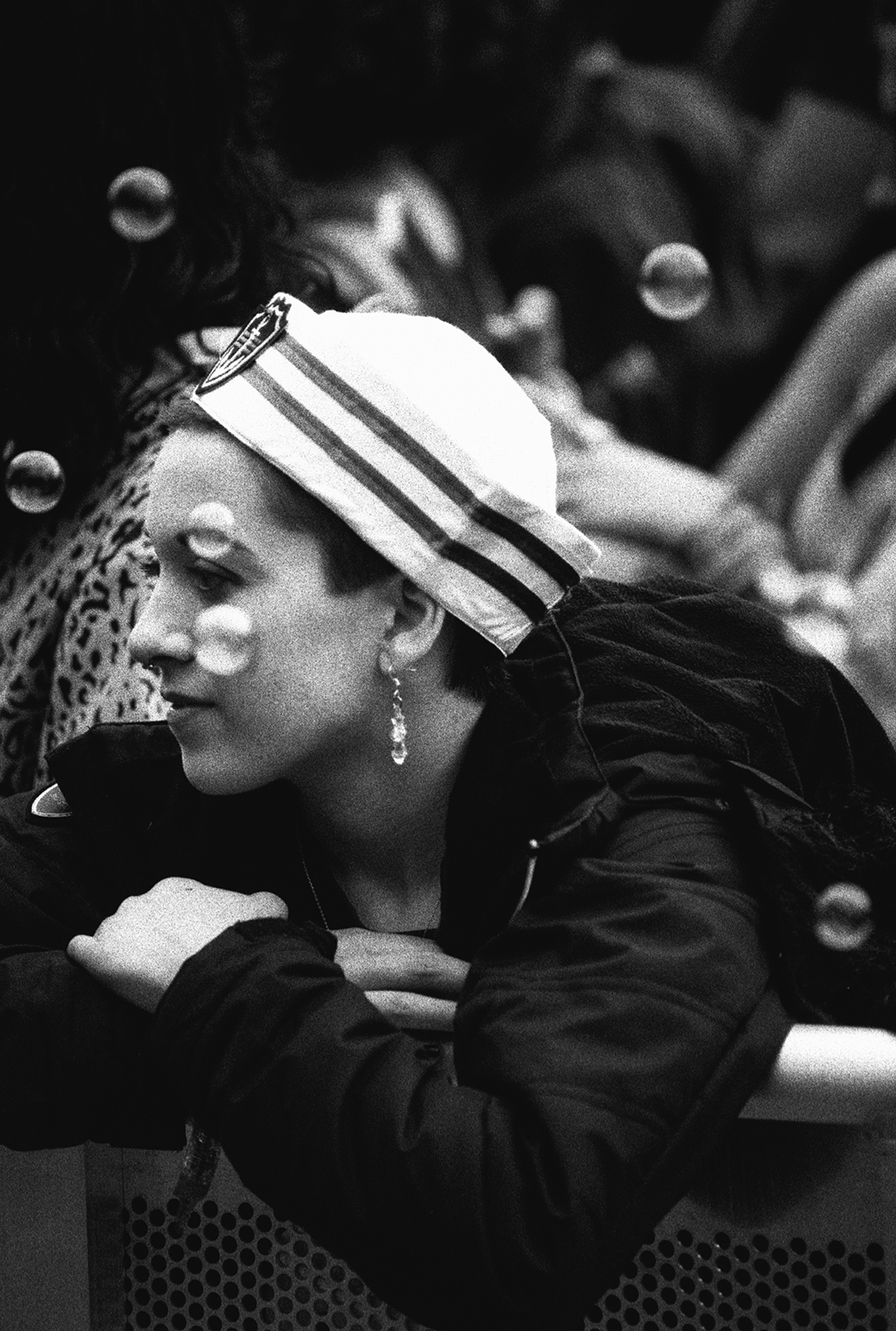
A woman framed by bubbles at Green Man Festival 2021

Renowned for its non-corporate, ethical approach, the Green Man Festival has won several awards including "Best Medium Sized Festival 2010", and "Grass Roots Festival 2012". In 2015, Green Man won "Best Festival" at the Live Music Business Awards. As Owner and Managing Director, Fiona Stewart received the Outstanding Achievement Award at the UK Festival Awards in 2013. It is the largest contemporary music and arts festival in Wales and has been given major event status by Welsh Government due to the festival's positive impact and wealth creation.

Green Man receives regular features and reviews in international, national and local press. It was previously awarded 5 star reviews by the Guardian, The Times, NME and iPaper. The Quietus stated that it "stakes its claim as one of Europe's very finest festivals", the Guardian wrote that the 2018 festival "proved again why Green Man is one of the UK's most beloved festivals" and Cosmopolitan stated that "Green Man is the most queer-friendly festival in the UK".

== Line-ups ==
The Green Man Festival line-ups have featured many notable bands over the years.

=== 2026 ===
The 2026 festival took place at Glanusk Park from 20 to 23 August. Headliners included Wolf Alice, Shame and Four Tet.

=== 2025 ===
Notable acts included: Wet Leg, Underworld, TV on the Radio, CMAT, Beth Gibbons, Stewart Lee, Gruff Rhys, English Teacher, Cymande, Wunderhorse, John Grant, Perfume Genius, Kneecap

=== 2024 ===
Notable acts included: Big Thief, Sampha, Jon Hopkins, Sleaford Mods, Arlo Parks, Explosions In The Sky, Devendra Banhart, The Jesus & Mary Chain and Ezra Collective.

=== 2023 ===
Devo, First Aid Kit, Self Esteem, Spiritualized, Amyl & The Sniffers, Slowdive, Young Fathers, The Walkmen, Confidence Man, Goat, The Comet Is Coming, Squid, Lankum, Sudan Archives, Snail Mail, Jockstrap, Warmduscher, Gilla Band, Les Savy Fav, The Delgados, The Wedding Present, Beth Orton, Obongjayar, Billy Nomates, Bob Vylan, Daniel Avery, Dur-Dur Band, Courtney Marie Andrews, Buck Meek, James Holden, Sorry, PVA, Clipping, Girl Ray, Julie Byrne, Rozi Plain, Alabaster DePlume, Kanda Bongo Man, Special Interest, Gina Birch, Jake Xerxes Fussell, Anna B Savage, Cory Hanson, Etran De L'Air, The Orielles, Melin Melyn, The Bug Club, Josephine Foster, Christian Lee Hutson, Sarah Jarosz, Say She She, Marie Davidson, Arushi Jain, H. Hawkline, Crows, Water from Your Eyes, Floodlights, Thus Love, Alice Boman, Salami Rose Joe Louis, deathcrash, Yasmin Williams, Aoife Nessa Frances, Oscar Lang, Mega Bog, Gently Tender, Fat Dog, Hagop Tchaparian, The Gentle Good, Etta Marcus, Clara Mann, Cumgirl8, Freak Slug, Island of Love, Lady Maisery, The Last Dinner Party, Mary in the Junkyard, Seb Lowe

=== 2022 ===
Kraftwerk, Michael Kiwanuka, Beach House, Metronomy, Bicep, Parquet Courts, Kae Tempest, Cate Le Bon, Ty Segall & Freedom Band, Ezra Furman, Dry Cleaning, Tune-Yards, Yves Tumor, Black Country, New Road, Jenny Hval, Arab Strap, Valerie June, Alex G, Arooj Aftab, Viagra Boys, Mdou Moctar, Orchestra Baobab, The Murder Capital, Witch, Mary Lattimore, Jessie Buckley & Bernard Butler, Willie J Healey, Frazey Ford, Torres, Donny Benét, BCUC, Charlotte Adigery & Bolis Pupul, Nia Archives, Carwyn Ellis/Rio18 w/BBC National Orchestra of Wales, Ichiko Aoba, Sofia Kourtesis, Optimo (Espacio), Lone, Nathan Fake (live), Lice, Psychedelic Porn Crumpets, Scalping, Cassandra Jenkins, James Yorkston & Second Hand Orchestra, Katy J Pearson, John Francis Flynn, Pip Blom, Pictish Trail, Minyo Crusaders, Marisa Anderson & William Tyler, Modern Nature, Planningtorock, Balimaya Project, Prima Queen, Group Listening, Keeley Forsyth, Soccer96, Art School Girlfriend, Grove, Indigo De Souza, Gretel Hanlyn, Bess Atwell, Cola, Gotts Street Park, Ethan P. Flynn, Naima Bock, Annie Hart, Adwaith, Elanor Moss, Maria Somerville, Strawberry Guy, Katherine Priddy, Melin Melyn, Wunderhorse, The Umlauts, Keg, Honeyglaze, Maria BC, Rhodri Davies, Cerys Hafana, Blue Bendy, Deathcrash, English Teacher, Lime Garden, Tapir!, Tara Clerkin Trio

=== 2021 ===
Mogwai, Caribou, Fontaines D.C., Tirzah, Thundercat, Teenage Fanclub, Django Django, This Is The Kit, José González, Gruff Rhys, The Staves, Nadine Shah, Black Midi, Shame, Lump, Kokoroko, BC Camplight, Nubya Garcia, Self Esteem, Richard Dawson, Kelly Lee Owens, Ghost Poet, Greentea Peng, Georgia, Snapped Ankles, Goat Girl, Billie Marten, Erland Cooper, Catrin Finch & Seckou Keita, Gwenno, Vanishing Twin, Porridge Radio, Viagra Boys, Working Men's Club, Boy Azooga, Ross From Friends (live), The Orielles, Matt Maltese, Emma-Jean Thackray, Pictish Trail, The Surfing Magazines, Peggy Sue, Yazmin Lacey, Overmono, Los Bitchos, Big Joanie, Jockstrap, Crack Cloud, Giant Swan, DJ Rap, Stephen Fretwell, Hen Ogledd, Alabaster DePlume, Falle Nioke, Liz Lawrence, Wu-Lu, Katy J Pearson, Steam Down, PVA, Sinead O'Brien, Phoebe Green, NewDad, King Hannah, Hak Baker, H.Hawkline, Loraine James, Hannah Holland, Sarathy Korwar, Deep Throat Choir, Broadside Hacks, Fenne Lily, Ed Dowie, Buzzard Buzzard Buzzard, Peaness, Home Counties, Yard Act, The Lounge Society, Wet Leg, Matilda Mann, Gwenifer Raymond, Studio Electrophonique, Tony Njoku, LYR, John, The Golden Dregs, Deliluh, The Cool Greenhouse, Speedboat, Blood Wizard, Bugs, Caroline, Do Nothing, Drug Store Romeos, Duski, Egyptian Blue, Iwan Rheon, The Goa Express, Gonhill, Hanya, Laundromat, Lazarus Kane, Martha Skye Murphy, Melin Melyn, Modern Woman, Nuha Ruby Ra, Panic Shack, Pet Deaths, Prima Queen, Roscoe Roscoe, Sister Wives, Teddy Hunter, Tina, Alfresco Disco, Art School Girlfriend DJ, Big Jeff, Birthday Club, Charlotte Church's Late Night Pop Dungeon, Deptford Northern Soul Club, Dutty Disco, Hot Singles Club

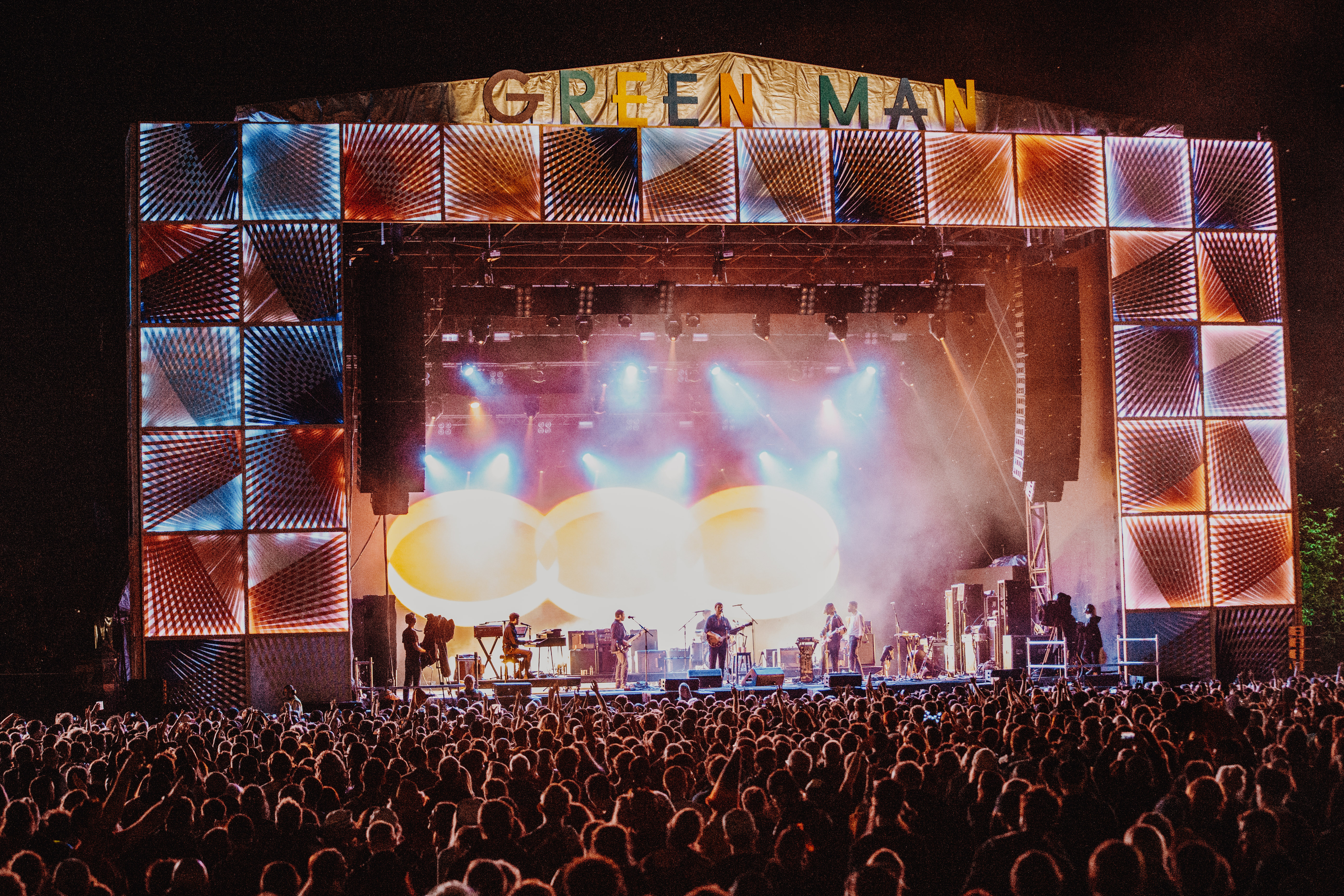
Fleet Foxes, headlining Green Man Festival 2018

=== 2019 ===
A Certain Ratio, Adwaith, Aidan Moffat & RM Hubbert, Aldous Harding, Alex Rex, Alfresco Disco, Amadou & Mariam, Anais Mitchell, Anna St Louis, Arlo Day, Art School Girlfriend, Audiobooks, Avi Buffalo, Beabadoobee, Bess Atwell, Big Thief, Bill Ryder-Jones, Black Country, New Road, Bodega, Bridget St John, Brigid Mae Power, Callum Easter, Car Seat Headrest, Chappaqua Wrestling, Chelou, Chloe Foy, Deptford Northern Soul Club, DJ Big Jeff, Dry Cleaning, Durand Jones & The Indications, Dutty Disco, Eels, Eitha Da, Ex:Re, Ezra Collective, Father John Misty, Fever Club, Four Tet, Foxwarren, George Ogilvie, Greg Wilson, Grimm Grimm, Gwenifer Raymond, Gwenno, Hand Habits, Heavenly Jukebox, Hen Ogledd, Idles, James Heath, James Yorkston, Jerry, Jesca Hoop, Jockstrap, Johanna Samuels, John Talabot, Julia Jacklin, Just Mustard, Khruangbin, Lamb, Lee Fields & The Expressions, Malena Zavala, Mama's Broke, Mapache, Maribou State, Marika Hackman, Meggie Brown, Modern Nature, Molly Payton, N0V3L, Nilüfer Yanya, Oscar Lang, Peaness, Penelope Isles, Pet Shimmers, Pictish Trail, Pigs Pigs Pigs Pigs Pigs Pigs Pigs, Porridge Radio, Pottery, Pozi, PVA, Richard Thompson, Rosehip Teahouse, Say Sue Me, Scalping, Self Esteem, Sharon van Etten, Shy FX, Skinny Pelembe, Snapped Ankles, Sons of Kemet, Spiritcake, Squid, Squirrel Flower, Stealing Sheep, Stella Donnelly, Stereolab, Steve Mason, Tamino, The Beths, The Big Moon, The Comet is Coming, The Growlers, The Intergalactic Republic of Kongo, The Liminanas, The Mauskovic Dance Band, These New Puritans, The Wedding Present, Tim Presley's White Fence, Tiny Ruins, TVAM, Villagers, Whitney, Willie J Healey, Wych Elm, Yak, Yo La Tengo

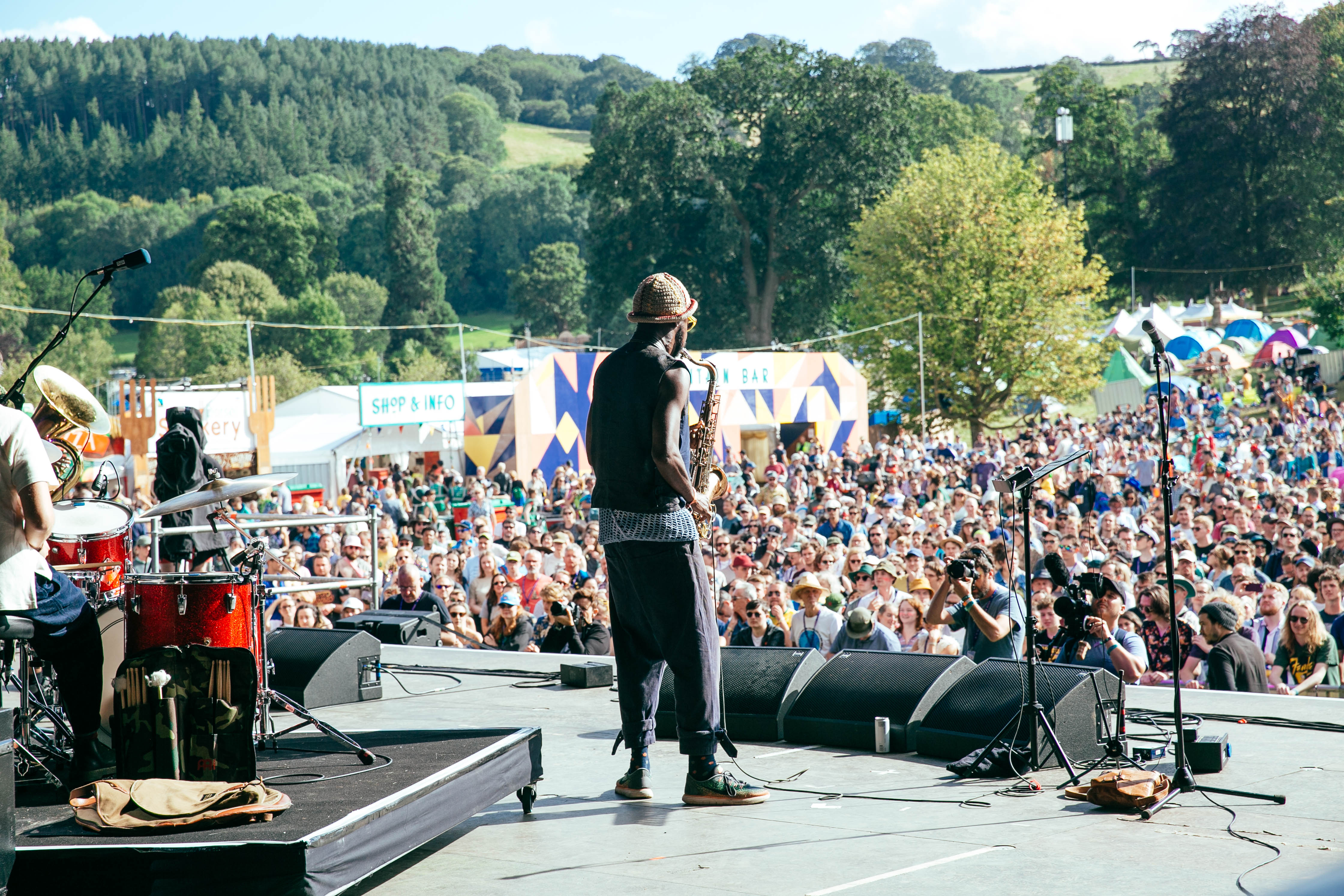
Sons of Kemet, Green Man 2019

=== 2018 ===
Fenne Lily, The War on Drugs, Fleet Foxes, Brian Jonestown Massacre, Lemon Twigs, Teenage Fanclub, Anna Calvi, Dirty Projectors, The Wedding Present

=== 2017 ===
PJ Harvey, Ryan Adams, Future Islands, Kae Tempest, Angel Olsen, Thee Oh Sees, Saint Etienne, Sleaford Mods, Conor Oberst, Julia Jacklin, Ride, Pictish Trail and The Big Moon.

=== 2016 ===
Her’s, Belle and Sebastian, James Blake, Laura Marling, Wild Beasts, Warpaint, Grandaddy, Tindersticks, Julia Holter, White Denim, Battles, BC Camplight, Unknown Mortal Orchestra, Floating Points, Ezra Furman, Michael Rother, Songhoy Blues, Jagwar Ma, Cate Le Bon, Fat White Family

=== 2015 ===
St Vincent, Super Furry Animals, Hot Chip, Leftfield, Slowdive, Goat, Father John Misty, Calexico, Television, Mew, Courtney Barnett, The Fall, Public Service Broadcasting, Temples, The Staves, Charles Bradley, Sun Ra Arkestra, Matthew E. White, Hunck, Beyond The Wizards Sleeve, The 2 Bears, Viet Cong, Dan Deacon, Waxahatchee, Hookworms, Marika Hackman, Emmy the Great

=== 2014 ===
Neutral Milk Hotel, Mercury Rev, Beirut, The Waterboys, Bill Callahan, Caribou, First Aid Kit, Slint, Nick Mulvey, The War on Drugs, Kurt Vile, Sharon Van Etten, Daughter, Poliça, Real Estate, Mac DeMarco, Panda Bear, Anna Calvi, Georgia Ruth, H. Hawkline, Sen Segur, Memory Clinic

=== 2013 ===
Kings of Convenience, Band of Horses, Ben Howard, Patti Smith, Fuck Buttons, Villagers, Swans, John Cale, Edwyn Collins, Stornoway, The Horrors, Midlake, Beak, Moon Duo, Parquet Courts, Phosphorescent, Jacco Gardner, Jon Hopkins, Sweet Baboo, Grass House, Roy Harper, Erol Alkan, Veronica Falls, Unknown Mortal Orchestra, Local Natives, Low, Darkstar, British Sea Power, Intermission Project, First Aid Kit

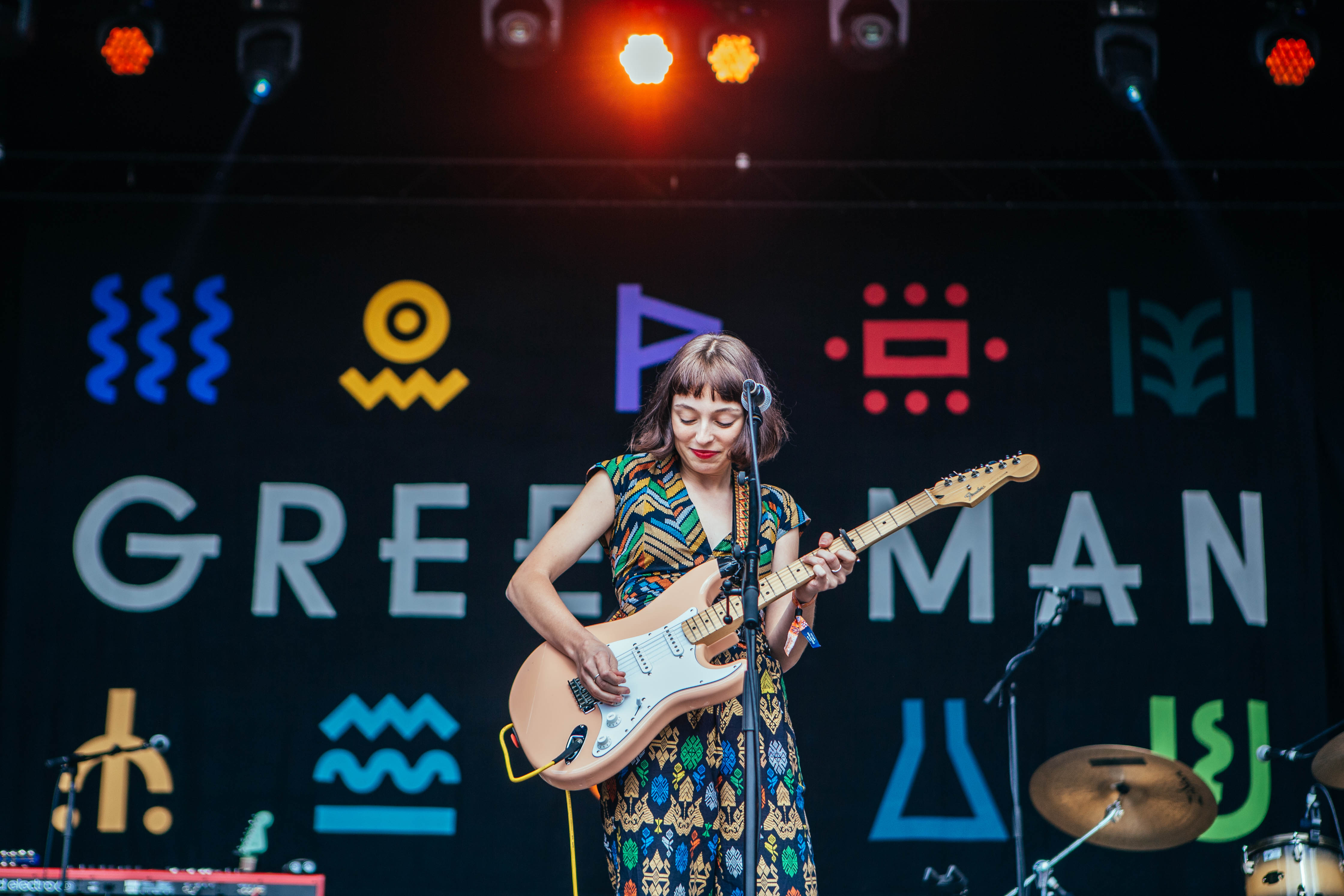
Stella Donnelly, Green Man Festival 2019

=== 2012 ===
Mogwai, Feist, Van Morrison, The Tallest Man On Earth, The Walkmen, Yann Tiersen, The Felice Brothers, Tune-Yards, Jonathan Richman, Dexys, Michael Kiwanuka, Cate Le Bon

=== 2011 ===
Fleet Foxes, Explosions In The Sky, Iron and Wine, The Low Anthem, Noah & The Whale, James Blake, Bellowhead, Villagers, Laura Marling, Robyn Hitchcock, The 2 Bears, Andrew Weatherall

=== 2010 ===
Doves, The Flaming Lips, Joanna Newsom, Mumford & Sons, Beirut, Billy Bragg, The Unthanks, Tindersticks, Laura Marling, Darwin Deez, John Grant, Fionn Regan, Fuck Buttons, Wild Beasts, Girls, Johnny Flynn, These New Puritans, The Tallest Man on Earth, Summer Camp, Steve Mason, "Metronomy Presents"

=== 2009 ===
Animal Collective, Jarvis Cocker, Wilco, Bon Iver, Wooden Shjips, British Sea Power, Errors, Grizzly Bear, Peggy Sue, Erland & The Carnival, Andrew Bird, Trembling Bells, Dirty Three

=== 2008 ===
Spiritualized, Super Furry Animals, Pentangle, Richard Thompson, Iron & Wine, The National, Laura Marling, Radio Luxembourg

=== 2007 ===
Joanna Newsom, Robert Plant, Stephen Malkmus, Devendra Banhart, Bill Callahan, Vashti Bunyan, Stephen Duffy & The Lilac Time, Battles, Seasick Steve, Gruff Rhys, Vetiver, Tunng, Steve Adey, John Renbourn, The Aliens, The Earlies

=== 2006 ===
Donovan, Jose Gonzalez, Calexico, Bat for Lashes, Micah P. Hinson, Jack Rose, Adem, Marissa Nadler

=== 2005 ===
Incredible String Band, Bonnie Prince Billy, Joanna Newsom, Adem, Wizz Jones, Tunng

== History ==
Green Man Festival was founded by Jo Bartlett and Danny Hagan as a 300-person one-day event at Craig-y-Nos Castle, Brecon, in 2003. The festival moved to Baskerville Hall, outside Hay-on-Wye, for a two-day event in 2004, and by 2005 it had evolved into a three-day event. The festival was attended by 300 people in 2003, its first year, by 1,000 in 2004, and by 3,000 in 2005. Fiona Stewart joined in 2006 as joint Managing Director. In the same year, Press Officer Ken Lower was made a non-voting minority shareholder, and the team moved the festival to its current location on Glanusk Park near Crickhowell, in the Brecon Beacons National Park in Wales and increased Green Man to a 6,000 capacity festival. In 2009 Danny Hagan resigned as Director, retaining his shares, and Ken Lower sold his shares. In 2011 Jo and Danny sold their shares to Fiona Stewart and left the company. Fiona increased the capacity from 15,000 to 25,000 and Green Man is currently the only major independent UK music festival to have a female director with controlling ownership.

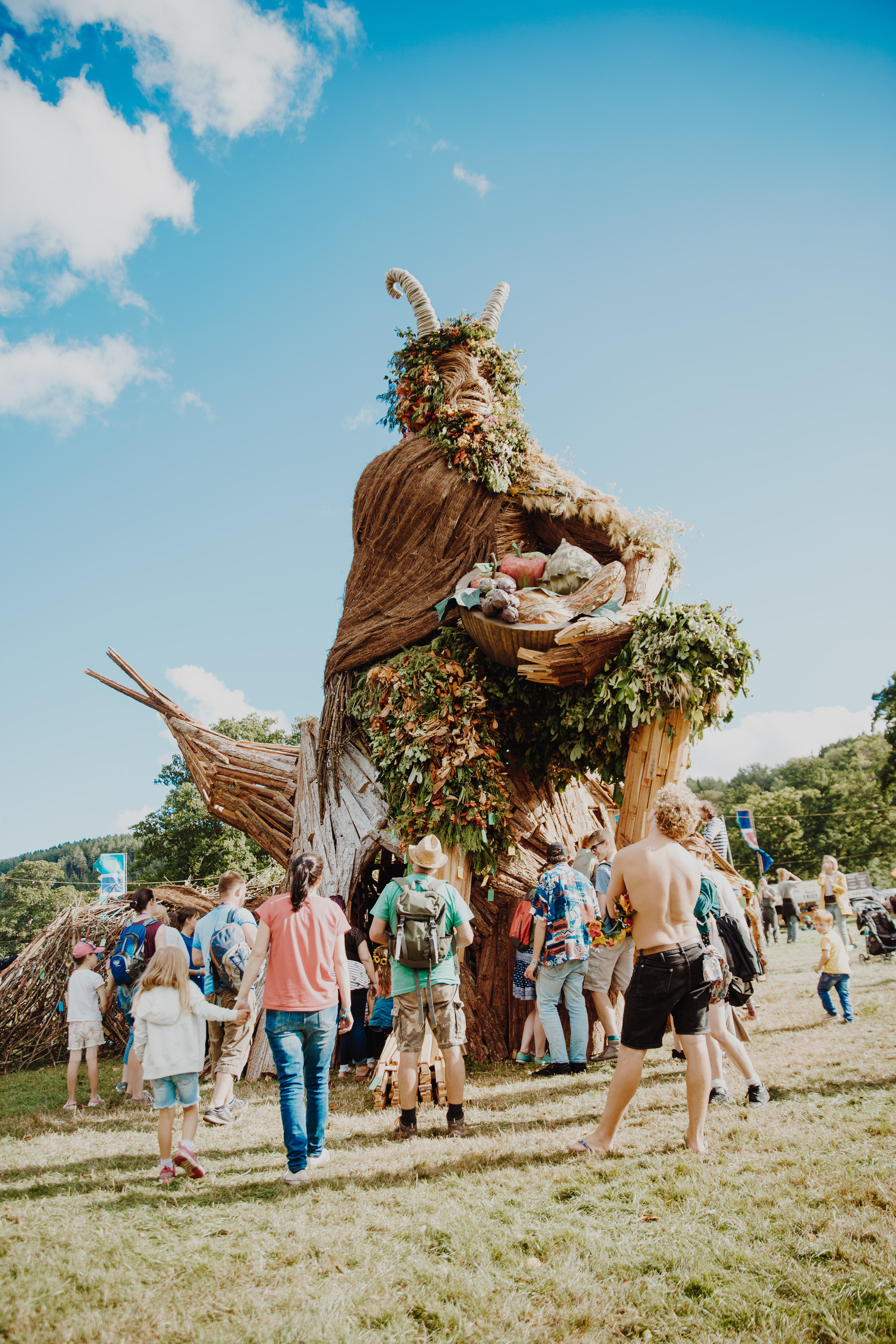
The Green Man statue, which is set on fire at the end of each Green Man Festival

In 2012, the festival had a daily capacity of 15,000 people and the headline acts were Mogwai, Van Morrisson and Feist. By 2013, the festival had 20,000 visitors. The 2017 festival celebrated the event's 15th anniversary. In 2018, it had 25,000 visitors, with headline acts including Fleet Foxes, The War on Drugs and Public Service Broadcasting. Bands and DJs play a range of musical styles, including indie, Americana, folk, psychedelia, reggae, and electro. In 2019, the headliners were Stereolab, Four Tet and Idles. Headline acts announced for 2020 were Caribou, Goldfrapp, Michael Kiwanuka, Mac DeMarco and Little Dragon - the 2020 edition was postponed due to the COVID-19 pandemic, replaced by a digital version that year.

As well as music areas, the festival has a wellness and spa, children and teen zones, a science engagement area called Einstein's Garden, tents for literature, film and comedy. The festival regularly sells out months in advance and in 2018 contributed £10.4 million to the Welsh economy.

Green Man Festival refuses commercial sponsorship and therefore can focus on local Welsh food and drink providers, rather than being tied into corporate deals. It directly employs its workers, paying a living wage. The festival has a strong ethical and environmental focus, using solar power as much as possible. The food and drink services are required to meet standards such as being Fairtrade, Red Tractor and Marine Conservation Society accredited. In 2019, Help Refugees (now known as Choose Love) and Newport to Calais Aid Collective collected donated tents to be recycled and reused. The festival has never used single-use plastics and encourages caterers to use Welsh produce.

For the August 2026 festival Green Man decided not to burn the giant effigy as part of the closing ceremony, because of the risk of wildfires. Portable barbecues and campfires were also prohibited.

== Charities, community work and regional partnerships ==
The festival is a charitable partner of The Bevan Foundation and Oxfam Cymru, Cymdeithas yr Iaith Gymraeg, RSPB Cymru and Brecon Beacons National Park Authority all host stalls at the festival. Each year 40 stalls (worth over £17,000) are allocated to Welsh Charities and Not-for-Profit Organisations. £20,000 is raised annually for local arts and sports projects through a stall run by the Cwmdu Friends. In 2013 more than £16,000 was raised for a charitable trip to Uganda for students at the local Crickhowell High School. Since 2010, Green Man has raised £250,000 of donations for charities. A 2015 UK Music report, compiled based on research from Oxford Economics, identified Green Man, alongside the Wales Millennium Centre, as a major driver of Music Tourism in Wales.

=== Green Man Trust ===
The Green Man Trust is the charitable wing of the festival, its aim is to create arts development programmes, training opportunities, science engagement and bring about positive change to Welsh communities. The current ambassador for Green Man Trust is Welsh actor and musician, Iwan Rheon, whose work has included Game of Thrones, Misfits and Riviera. As of 2020, it had provided 92 community grants, supported more than 5,000 emerging artists, trained over 2,000 people and funded more than 200 science projects. Training programs have included partnering with Merthyr Tydfil College and the Salvation Army in Cardiff to give training and mentoring to young adults from disadvantaged backgrounds. In 2020, the trust pledged an emergency fund supporting Welsh people affected by flooding caused by Storm Dennis. and raised over £20,000.

== Other ventures ==
- Launched in 2008, Green Man Rising is an annual contest in which an emerging act is chosen by a panel of music industry experts to open the Mountain Stage on the first day of the festival.
- Green Man Growler is the festival's specially brewed beer, it has been sold at the festival since 2012 and was made available to buy online as a canned beer in 2020.
- In 2006, Green Man hosted its first annual Boat Party on the River Thames. The event usually featured a line-up of both live music and DJ sets and a bar. The last boat party in 2012 featured performances by Field Music, Three Trapped Tigers and Tom Williams & The Boat. In 2016, Green Man renamed the boat party Green Man Ahoy!. The event took place on 7 May 2016 and featured Slow Club, Gengahr and Palace Winter.
- In September 2015, the Green Man took its Courtyard bar to King's Cross in London for a four-day celebration of Welsh beer and cider. Over 180 beers and ciders were bought from independent Welsh brewers. Live music came from Ibibio Sound Machine, Stealing Sheep, Boxed In, Meilyr Jones, C Duncan, Cairobi and The Wave Pictures. The line-up on the Sunday was co-curated with Moshi Moshi Records.
- The Green Man Festival celebrated St David's Day with a special one-day event in London's Cecil Sharp House. It was named ‘Hwyl’ (a lyrical Welsh term for ‘fun’) and was a celebration of Welsh culture, crafts and gastronomy with talks, theatre, storytelling and comedy. In 2015, live music came from Teleman, Georgia Ruth, Stanley Brinks, Sweet Baboo and Cowbois Rhos Botwnnog. HWYL did not take place in 2016.
- Busk On The Usk was a free one-day festival held in Newport, South Wales at various locations along the banks of the River Usk. The event was The Welsh Contemporary Music's contribution to the London 2012 Cultural Olympiad and was co-produced by Fiona Stewart. The event featured a program of live music, discussions and lectures, art installations and local food stalls. The event was organised by Green Man with help from the people of Newport along with contributions from a number of Wales’ most important cultural organisations including Sŵn Festival, the Do Lectures, the Laugharne Weekend, the Bevan Foundation, the Centre for Regeneration Excellence Wales, Riverfront Theatre, University of Wales Newport and Arts Council Wales. The music line-up included Scritti Politti, Anna Calvi, Cate Le Bon and Jon Langford. An estimated 6,000 people attended the event.

== See also ==
- List of music festivals in the United Kingdom
