= I'm Not Your Man =

Studio album by Marika Hackman
- Released: 2 June 2017
- Studio: Iguana Studio (London, England)
- Length: 48:43
- Labels: AMF; Virgin EMI; Sub Pop; Hostess
- Producer: Charlie Andrew

Marika Hackman chronology
We Slept at Last (2015)	I'm Not Your Man (2017)	Any Human Friend (2019)

I'm Not Your Man is the second full-length studio album by English musician Marika Hackman. It was released on 2 June 2017 by AMF Records, Virgin EMI Records, Sub Pop and Hostess Entertainment Unlimited.

== Critical reception ==
Professional ratings
Aggregate scores
Source	Rating
AnyDecentMusic?	7.9/10
Metacritic	80/100
Review scores
Source	Rating
The 405	9/10
AllMusic	4/5 stars
DIY	5/5 stars
The Guardian	4/5 stars
Mojo	3/5 stars
MusicOMH	4/5 stars
The Observer	3/5 stars
Pitchfork	7.5/10
Q	4/5 stars
Uncut	8/10

I'm Not Your Man received positive reviews from critics upon its release. At Metacritic, which assigns a normalised rating out of 100 to reviews from mainstream publications, the album received an average score of 80, based on 15 reviews.

Comparing it to Hackman's debut album, Rob Hughes of Uncut said, "I'm Not Your Man is a much rowdier navigation of female relationships and sexuality that moves between dark dreampop and post-Belly/Breeders rock, armed with flashing hooks." Andre Pain of the Evening Standard said, "Hackman has come of age on this arresting and emotionally charged album." Chris Taylor of The Line of Best Fit praised the album, writing, "Her new found confidence comes through in spades here and the end product is a record that shines with a captivating vibrancy. Often mislabeled and perhaps underestimated, Marika uses I'm Not Your Man to break out of that pigeonhole she was put into with gusto."

Chris Catchpole of Q wrote, "It's too long, but otherwise is an unexpected and thoroughly enjoyable artistic left-turn." In his review for Mojo, Andrew Perry wrote that "the record increasingly drifts into hazy, slo-mo dream-pop, which inescapably pales beside the bolder tracks upfront."

== Track listing ==
All tracks are written by Marika Hackman

No.	Title	Length
1.	"Boyfriend"	3:59
2.	"Good Intentions"	3:37
3.	"Gina's World"	4:14
4.	"My Lover Cindy"	3:11
5.	"Round We Go"	3:36
6.	"Violet"	4:02
7.	"Cigarette"	2:37
8.	"Time's Been Reckless"	3:54
9.	"Apple Tree"	2:55
10.	"So Long"	3:43
11.	"Eastbound Train"	4:02
12.	"Blahblahblah"	4:44
13.	"I'd Rather Be with Them"	4:09
Total length:		48:43

Bonus 7" / Digital bonus tracks
No.	Title	Length
14.	"AM"	4:05
15.	"Majesty"	3:17
Total length:		56:05

Deluxe bonus tracks
No.	Title	Length
14.	"AM"	4:05
15.	"Majesty"	3:17
16.	"Boyfriend" (Live from Marika's Bedroom)	4:04
17.	"My Lover Cindy" (Live from Marika's Bedroom)	3:03
Total length:		63:12

== Personnel ==
Credits adapted from liner notes.

Musicians

- Marika Hackman – vocals (all tracks), guitar (all tracks), bass guitar (5, 12), drums (9, 12), sarangi (6), congas (9), string arrangement (5, 12)
- Charlie Andrew – congas (1), drums (5)
- Juliette Jackson – guitar (1–4, 6, 8, 10, 11), background vocals (1–4, 6, 8, 10, 11)
- Sophie Nathan – guitar (1–4, 6, 8, 10, 11), background vocals (1–4, 6, 8, 10, 11)
- Celia Archer – bass guitar (1–4, 6, 8, 10, 11), background vocals (1–4, 6, 8, 10, 11)
- Fern Ford – drums (1–4, 6, 8, 10, 11)
- Kirsty Mangan – viola (7, 12), violin (12), strings (13), string arrangement (7, 13)
- Rachael Lander – cello (5)
- Austin Cooper – trumpet (9)
- Mark Rainbow – background vocals (9)

Technical

- Charlie Andrew – production, mixing
- Brett Cox – recording engineering
- Jay Pocknell – assistant recording engineering
- Katie Earl – assistant recording engineering
- Dick Beetham – mastering

Artwork

- Tristan Pigott – artwork
- Jeff Kleinsmith – design, art direction
- Marika Hackman – art direction

== Charts ==
Chart (2019)	Peak position
UK Albums (Official Charts)	74
