= Fiona Stewart =

Fiona Stewart may refer to:

- Fiona Stewart (author) (born 1966), Australian author and euthanasia activist
- Fiona Stewart (event director), UK-based owner and director of Green Man Festival
