= This Wicked Tongue (band) =

- Origin: England
- Genres: Rock music alternative rock
- Years active: 2010–present
- Members: Christina Maynard; Haydn Rogers; Rob Taylor; Ryan Lerigo-Jones
- Past members: James Allin; Si Anthony; Ben Pemberton
- Website: www.thiswickedtongue.com

This Wicked Tongue is a self-published independent rock band formed in March 2010, in Worcester, England. The band has supported Van Morrison, Athlete, Toploader (three times) and Dodgy at major regional festivals and events in the English West Midlands. Band members are Christina Maynard (vocals, guitar and keyboards); Haydn Rogers (guitar, vocals); Rob Taylor (bass); and Ryan Lerigo-Jones (drums). Previous drummers include James Allin and Ben Pemberton.

== History ==
Founding member Christina Maynard was reviewed by Andy O'Hare of BBC Hereford and Worcester local radio, who described her as "the soon-to-be-superstar that is the wonderful Christina Maynard aka Tina V" aired on BBC local radio on 9 April 2010.

The broadcast speculated upon the name "The Tina V band", mentioning that Tina's nascent band had been booked to perform at the Teme Valley Bridge Bash. The band, by then named This Wicked Tongue after the song by PJ Harvey, opened on the main stage two acts before the festival headliners Athlete.

The band's debut took place at Worcester's Marrs Bar on 18 April 2010, where the band was described by a BBC reviewer as "the best bunch of rockers I have heard in a long long time" (broadcast 30 April 2010).

On 4 January 2011, the band was invited by Andrew Marston to perform a live concert for BBC radio at the Imperial in Hereford, broadcast on 22 January on BBC radio.

Positive reviews for This Wicked Tongue include Ravenheart Music – "This Wicked Tongue is dragging rock music into the 21st century by its short and curlies", Aaron Philipps of Amazing Radio – "Distorted guitars, searing melodies, powerhouse vocals, I just love this band. They’re called This Wicked Tongue."

== Videos ==
The band makes its own music videos. The music site www.carpemusica.com commented "We get sent a lot of music videos, but few manage to capture our attention even half as much as This Wicked Tongue's. This is a band whose music can cross genres in a heartbeat and manages to deliver a wonderfully creative sound."

== Recordings and videos ==
Recordings – self-released; physical and download

- December 2010: The Storm in the Hourglass (5-track EP)
- February 2011: "The Last Syllable" (single)
- August 2011: Carry This (3-track EP)
- February 2012: This Wicked Tongue (3-track EP)
- August 2012: Provinces (6-track EP)
- April 2013: "Mick Hucknall's Hair" (single)

Videos – self-made; available on YouTube

- July 2011: The Last Syllable
- October 2011: Creature
- March 2012: If This Is Me
- August 2012: House
- October 2012: Cape Pelorum

== 2012 ==
In 2012, Maynard took part in the BBC's Musicians Masterclass, held at their Maida Vale and Abbey Road studios, and the band received its first play on national radio by Tom Robinson, on his BBC Radio 6 Music show. 2012 also saw the band open the main stage at The Green Man Festival in Glanusk, Wales, headlined by Van Morrison.
