= Francobollo =

Swedish indie rock band

- Origin: Sweden
- Genres: Indie rock, alternative rock
- Years active: 2010–present
- Labels: Square Leg Records
- Members: Simon Nilsson (vocals, guitar); Sean Bean (drums); Petter Grevelius (guitar); Sam Bailey (bass).
- Past members: Wiya Hellborg, Frans Möller (vocals, guitar), Viktor Rossi (guitar)
- Website: francobolloband.com

Francobollo, are a Swedish indie rock band from Lund, Sweden made up of Simon Nilsson, Petter Grevelius, Sam Bailey and Sean Bean.

in 2016 they signed to Charlie Andrew's label Square Leg Records. The band have since released three singles, five official videos, one EP, and one album. They have toured with bands including The Big Moon & Marika Hackman.

The band's debut album, Long Live Life was released on 14 July. To coincide with the album's release, the band announced a 20+ date headline tour of the UK and Europe.

== Discography ==
=== Albums ===
Title	Release details	Peak		
Title	Release details	NOR	AUS	UK
Long Live Life LP	Released: 14 July 2017; Label: Square Leg Records; Format: Digital download, CD, Vinyl	—	—	—

=== Extended plays ===
Title	Release details	Peak		
Title	Release details	NOR	AUS	UK
Wonderful EP	Released: October 2016; Label: Square Leg Records; Format: Digital download	—	—	—
