= Any Human Friend =

Studio album by Marika Hackman
- Released: 9 August 2019
- Recorded: Konk Studios, Coronet Studios, and Bayford Studio (London, England)
- Genre: Indie rock
- Length: 41:04
- Labels: AMF; Virgin EMI; Sub Pop
- Producers: Marika Hackman; David Wrench

Marika Hackman chronology
I'm Not Your Man (2017)	Any Human Friend (2019)	Big Sigh (2024)

Any Human Friend is the third full-length studio album by English musician Marika Hackman. It was released on 9 August 2019 by AMF Records, Virgin EMI Records and Sub Pop.

== Critical reception ==
Professional ratings
Aggregate scores
Source	Rating
AnyDecentMusic?	8.1/10
Metacritic	84/100
Review scores
Source	Rating
AllMusic	3.5/5 stars
The Daily Telegraph	4/5 stars
Financial Times	4/5 stars
The Guardian	5/5 stars
The Independent	4/5 stars
The Observer	4/5 stars
Paste	9.3/10
Pitchfork	7.3/10
Q	4/5 stars
Uncut	8/10

Any Human Friend received positive reviews from critics upon its release. At Metacritic, which assigns a normalised rating out of 100 to reviews from mainstream publications, the album received an average score of 84, based on 15 reviews.

Aimee Cliff of The Guardian praised the album, giving it a perfect score. In her review for The Independent, Alexandra Pollard called Any Human Friend "a blunt, bold album on which Hackman's beatific voice sits atop methodically messy instrumentals." Clare Martin of Paste gave the album a 9.3 out of 10, calling it "a treasure trove of zippy guitar hooks, glimmering synths and lemony vocals expertly curated by Hackman." Writing for PopMatters, Chris Ingalls called it "a quantum leap forward for Hackman, as the more fully-formed, full-band arrangements add a welcome element to her sharp lyrical content. The music is biting and arresting yet never manages to distract from what she's singing about. Rather, it creates new and exciting dimensions to what would have probably been great songs even with simple acoustic guitar accompaniment."

== Track listing ==
All tracks are written by Marika Hackman. "Wanderlust" produced by Hackman, all other tracks produced by Hackman and David Wrench

No.	Title	Length
1.	"Wanderlust"	3:17
2.	"The One"	3:37
3.	"All Night"	3:42
4.	"Blow"	3:30
5.	"I'm Not Where You Are"	3:46
6.	"Send My Love"	5:20
7.	"Hand Solo"	3:50
8.	"Conventional Ride"	4:10
9.	"Come Undone"	3:46
10.	"Hold On"	2:52
11.	"Any Human Friend"	3:14
Total length:		41:04

Notes

- All track titles are stylised in all lowercase.

== Personnel ==
Credits adapted from liner notes.

Musicians

- Marika Hackman – vocals (all tracks), guitar (all tracks), bass guitar (2–11), synthesizer (2–11), piano (2, 4, 11), bells (7), drums (10), string arrangement (3, 7, 9–11)
- David Wrench – percussion (2, 3, 7, 9, 11), Hammond organ (6), tambourine (8), theremin (8)
- Jessica Batour – drums (2–9, 11)
- Gillian Maguire – viola (3, 6, 7, 9–11), violin (3, 6, 7, 9–11)

Technical

- Marika Hackman – production (all tracks), mixing (1), recording engineering (1)
- David Wrench – production (2–11), mixing (2–11), recording engineering (2–11)
- Grace Banks – recording engineering (2, 4, 6, 7)
- Matt Colton – mastering (all tracks)

Packaging

- Joost Vandebrug – cover photography
- Bridget Beorse – design
- Dusty Summers – design

== Charts ==
Chart (2019)	Peak position
Scottish Albums (Official Charts)	23
UK Albums (Official Charts)	42
