= Art School Girlfriend =

Welsh musician

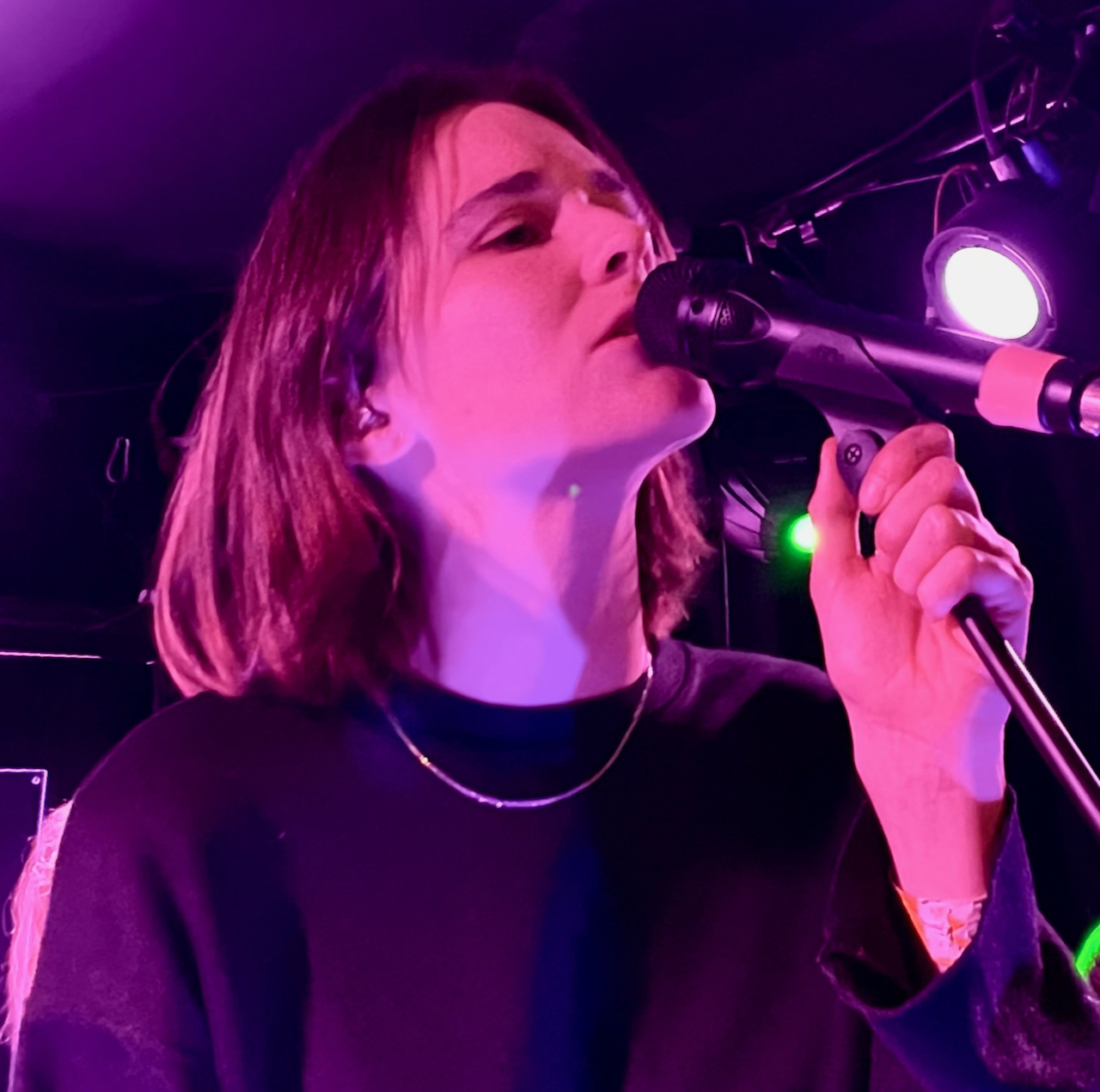
- Art School Girlfriend performing in 2023

Background information
- Born: Polly Louise Mackey; Wrexham, Clwyd, Wales
- Genres: Electronic; pop; indie rock; shoegaze
- Occupations: Singer-songwriter; producer; musician
- Instruments: Singing; keyboard; guitar
- Years active: 2007–present
- Labels: Wolf Tone; Fiction
- Website: www.artschoolgirlfriend.co.uk

Polly Louise Mackey, also known by her stage name Art School Girlfriend, is a Welsh musician, producer, and singer-songwriter.

== Career ==
=== 2011–2016: Early career and previous band ===
In early 2011, Mackey moved to London with her shoegaze band, Deaf Club. Their debut EP, Lull was released for free on Bandcamp in 2011. Clash magazine wrote, "Deaf Club layer sound upon sound to blur their songwriting into a hallucinatory experience... They move in unexpected directions which demonstrate a real bravery." Lull was followed by a sold-out double A-side cassette on the Transgressive Records imprint, Kissability. In 2012, the band signed to Domino Publishing, toured the UK as headliners as well as in support of the band 2:54, and received support from BBC Radio 1 and BBC Radio 6music. The Guardian wrote of their live show, "There's a confidence to their dreamscape rock that belies the fact that they've only been together for a year... Among the glut of fresh acts, they're special...." In 2013, they appeared at festivals such as SXSW and Reading and Leeds and released their final EP, Take In Colour before disbanding in 2014. Their last show was at KOKO in London on 28 February 2014.

After the disbanding of Deaf Club, in 2015, Mackey provided backing vocals on The Maccabees fourth and final studio album, Marks to Prove It, as well as appearing with them on Later... with Jools Holland.

=== 2016–2019: Measures and Into The Blue Hour ===
In 2016, Mackey moved to Margate and started making music as Art School Girlfriend. "The Art School Girlfriends" was originally the name Mackey's ex-girlfriend thought of using for a DJ duo with her friend from art school, but then Mackey took it for her solo project as they never used it.

Mackey had been making demos on her laptop when she met engineer JHJ, in a bar in Peckham. He passed the demos onto Paul Epworth who had recently set up his own record label, Wolf Tone; Epworth invited Mackey to pursue production more seriously and finish her music at his studio, The Church Studios. This music would go on to become Art School Girlfriend's self-produced debut EP, Measures, which was released on Wolf Tone in September 2017 led by debut single, "Bending Back". Art School Girlfriend's first live show was on 27 September 2017 at The Nines in Peckham. That same year, Mackey began a sporadic radio show on Ghostpoet's online radio station, Radio Margate. In June 2018, Mackey was asked to DJ alongside Marika Hackman for Anna Calvi's return gig at London's Heaven nightclub.

Summer festival appearances and a debut tour in October 2018 saw Mackey assemble the band of musicians that would go on to play with her until 2021: guitarist Jac Roberts (also of Deaf Club), drummer Josh Heffernan and keyboards player Louis Swords Milburn. In 2019, the band played at POP Montreal during which Mackey's second EP, Into The Blue Hour was released, followed by appearances at SXSW and a second headline UK tour in April, which finished with a sold-out show at London's Omeara. Mackey joined the musician The Japanese House with a solo setup for a 5-week US tour shortly after. Into The Blue Hour saw Mackey experiment with denser layers of electronics, with Clash describing it as, "...a more exploratory account, with the hazy electronics tied together with innate pop understanding". This was followed by the double-A-side single, "Come Back To Me" and "Diving", which was released on 7-inch vinyl in June 2019.

This was followed by appearances at festivals such as Latitude and Green Man Festival, as well as touring in support of Marika Hackman, Orlando Weeks and IDER across the UK and Europe.

=== 2019–2021: Is It Light Where You Are ===
Mackey spent the summer of 2019 working on her debut album, which was written and recorded at The Church Studios during the aftermath of a breakup. "The bulk of this record was written during the two weeks after a long-term and quite strange breakup situation," Mackey tells Atwood Magazine, "I had left Margate, I was staying on my friend's sofa in London, and felt very un-anchored. So I found solace and temporary-home in a small corridor-like studio, where I spent 12 hours a day. I'd get up at 7am and drive to the Hampstead ponds and get in the cold water to try and shock away my feelings, shower and go to the studio."

With a delayed release due to the COVID-19 pandemic, Art School Girlfriend's debut album, Is It Light Where You Are, was released on 10 September 2021, on Fiction Records and Wolf Tone. The headline UK tour ended with a sold-out show at Village Underground in October 2021.

Mackey appears on Ghostpoet's 2020 album, I Grow Tired Yet Dare Not Fall Asleep. She also scored the BFI-supported film, Shy Radicals, based on Hamja Ahsan's book of the same name, as well as appearing in the film alongside Arlo Parks.

=== 2023: Soft Landing ===
On 18 January 2023, Mackey released "A Place To Lie", the lead single to her second album Soft Landing. The album was announced alongside a second single, "Close To The Clouds", which was premiered by Lauren Laverne on BBC Radio 6Music. Soft Landing was released on 4 August 2023 on Fiction Records. It was co-produced at The Church Studios with long-term collaborator Riley MacIntyre and features vocals from Tony Njoku. Clash describes the album as a "dreamy production emphasised by techno undertones, transcendental vocals and wistful instrumentals".

Mackey describes the album as a culmination of her teenage musical influences such as the Yeah Yeah Yeahs, Pixies and Warpaint, alongside her more recent experiences DJing at clubs and festivals.

=== 2025–present: Lean In ===
On 24 September 2025, Mackey released a new song, "L.Y.A.T.T.", which she said is "about the resilience of love through times of physical or mental distance and hardship." On 21 November, she announced her third album Lean In, alongside the release of its second single "The Peaks". The album was released on 11 March 2026 via Fiction Records.

== Personal life ==
Mackey resides in East London, and has a whippet called Captain. She runs a monthly radio show on Foundation FM, which focuses on ambient electronica. She lived in Margate between 2016 and 2019, where she ran the queer bookshop Spine Books.

Mackey is gay and is married to Marika Hackman. They live in the East End of London. Alongside being an artist, Mackey also has lectured in music production at The Institute of Contemporary Music Performance, Goldsmiths, University of London and University of the Arts London.

== Discography ==
Studio albums

- Is It Light Where You Are (2021, Wolf Tone)
- Soft Landing (2023, Fiction)
- Lean In (2026, Fiction)

Studio extended plays

- Measures (2017, Wolf Tone)
- Into the Blue Hour (2017, Wolf Tone)
- Diving / Come Back To me (2019, Wolf Tone)

Remix albums

- Is It Dark Where You Are (2022, Wolf Tone)
- Hard Landing (2023, Fiction Records)

Remix extended plays

- ASG Reworks EP (2019, Wolf Tone)

Live extended plays

- Live St Pancras 05.10.18 (2019, Wolf Tone)
