= Walking Like We Do =

Studio album by the Big Moon
- Released: 10 January 2020
- Studios: Studio BTS, Atlanta
- Length: 41:15
- Label: Fiction
- Producer: Ben H. Allen III

The Big Moon chronology
Love in the 4th Dimension (2017)	Walking Like We Do (2020)	Here Is Everything (2022)

Singles from Walking Like We Do
- 1. "It's Easy Then" Released: 6 August 2019; 2. "Your Light" Released: 10 September 2019; 3. "Take A Piece" Released: 19 November 2019; 4. "Barcelona" Released: 7 January 2020

Professional ratings
Aggregate scores
Source	Rating
Metacritic	79/100
Review scores
Source	Rating
Clash	8/10
DIY	4/5 stars
The Guardian	4/5 stars
The Line of Best Fit	7/10
MusicOMH	4/5 stars
NME	4/5 stars
Paste	7.8/10
Pitchfork	6.8/10

Walking Like We Do is the second studio album by British indie rock band the Big Moon, released on 10 January 2020 via Fiction Records. The album was recorded in Studio BTS, Atlanta by Ben H. Allen III.

== Track listing ==
Walking Like We Do track listing
No.	Title	Length
1.	"It's Easy Then"	3:44
2.	"Your Light"	5:07
3.	"Dog Eat Dog"	3:39
4.	"Why"	3:29
5.	"Don't Think"	4:08
6.	"Waves"	2:54
7.	"Holy Roller"	4:08
8.	"Take a Piece"	2:43
9.	"Barcelona"	3:46
10.	"A Hundred Ways to Land"	4:02
11.	"ADHD"	3:35
Total length:		41:15

== Personnel ==
Credits adapted from Walking Like We Do liner notes.

The Big Moon

- Juliette Jackson – vocals, guitars, keyboards, flute (tracks 7 and 9), piano (track 10)
- Soph Nathan – vocals, guitars, bass
- Celia Archer – vocals, keyboards, piano, bass
- Fern Ford – vocals, keyboards, drums, trumpet (track 1)

Additional musicians

- Ben H. Allen III – additional keyboards, percussion
- Richard Sherrington – horns
- Rob Opitz – horns

Production

- Ben H. Allen III – production, mixing
- Ben Etter – mixing, engineering
- Billy Halliday – additional engineering (track 8)
- Duncan Albert Jr. – assistant engineering
- Ian Horrocks – assistant engineering
- Parker Bradford – assistant engineering
- Rafael Rojas – assistant engineering
- Spencer Poole – assistant engineering
- Trae Young – assistant engineering
- Pooneh Ghana – photography

== Charts ==
Sales chart performance for Walking Like We Do
Chart (2020)	Peak position
Scottish Albums (Official Charts)	12
UK Albums (Official Charts)	19

== See also ==
- List of 2020 albums
