= Marika Hackman =

British singer-songwriter

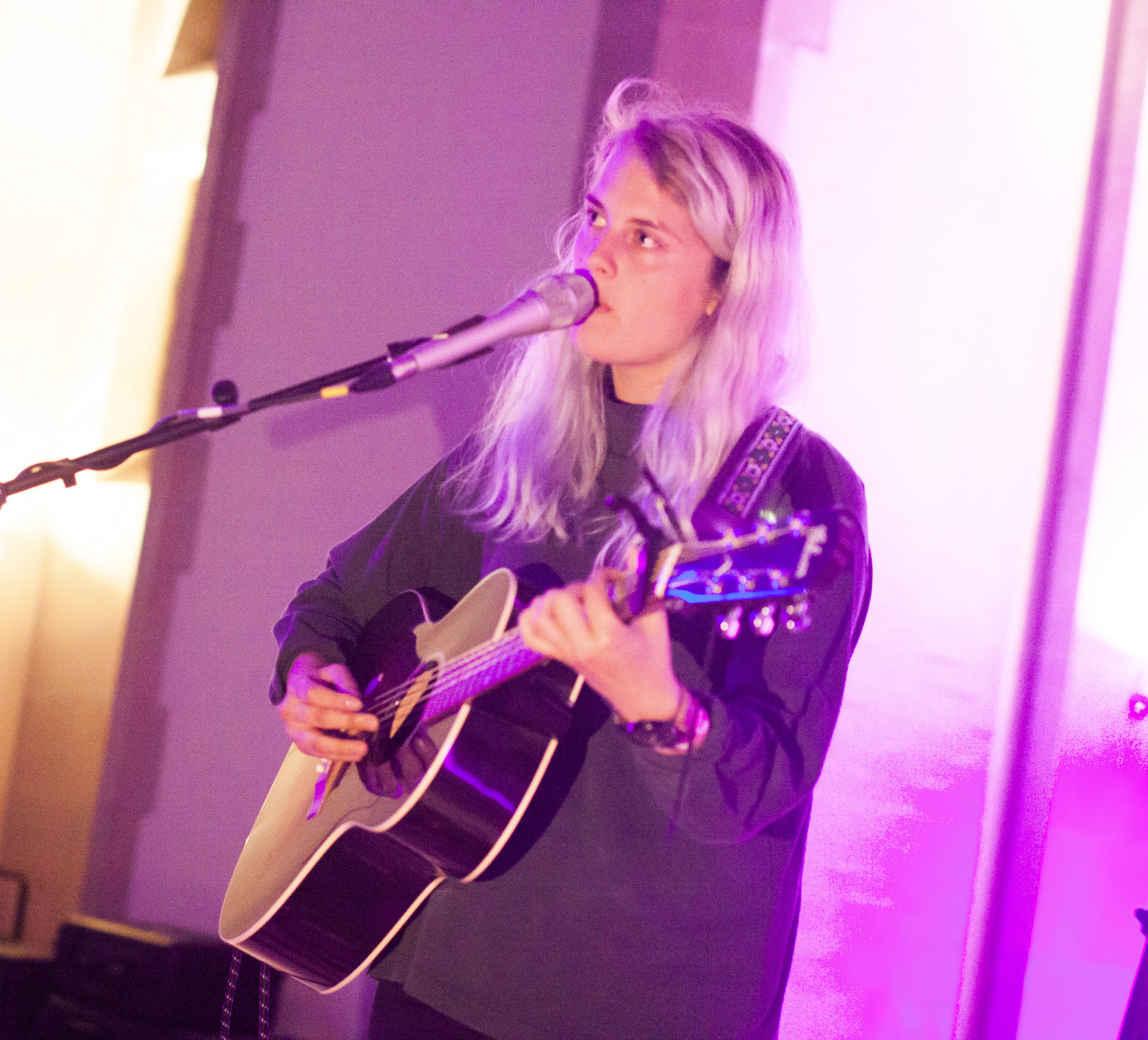
- Hackman at the Tramlines Festival in 2015

Background information
- Born: Marika Hackman; 17 February 1992 (age 34); Hampshire, England
- Origin: London, England
- Genre: Alternative rock
- Occupation: Singer-songwriter
- Instruments: Vocals, guitar, bass, drums
- Years active: 2012–present
- Labels: Dirty Hit; Transgressive; Sub Pop; Virgin EMI; AMF Records; Chrysalis Records
- Website: marikahackman.com

Marika Louise Hackman (born 17 February 1992) is an English vocalist, multi-instrumentalist and songwriter.

Hackman has released a mini-album, That Iron Taste (2013), and five full-length albums: We Slept at Last (2015); I'm Not Your Man (2017); Any Human Friend (2019); Covers (2020), and Big Sigh (2024). She has also released four EPs: Free Covers (2012), Sugar Blind (2013), Deaf Heat (2014), and Wonderland (2016).

In 2023, Hackman released a new song called "No Caffeine". The track is taken from the album Big Sigh, released on 12 January 2024, which was her first studio album in five years. She described the album as the "hardest record she's ever made".

== Early life ==
Hackman was born in Hampshire, England, and raised in Selborne and Devon. Her mother and Finnish father met during their work as animators. Hackman watched little television as a child. She and her older brother, Ben, a dance music producer who releases material under the name "Hackman", were instead encouraged to find other creative outlets. Hackman is a self-taught guitarist and began learning when she was 12. She had lessons in piano from the age of 4, and lessons in the bass guitar and drums from the age of 10.

Due to her musical talents, she won a scholarship to attend the local Bedales School as a day pupil from ages 11 to 17. At the age of 17, Hackman contracted sepsis after her appendix burst on a family trip to Finland. The near-fatal experience triggered her first panic attack and chronic anxiety. The experience has been credited with the gory, bodily thematic traits found within her music. Describing it as a "brush with death" and a catalyst for her musical journey, the experience also contributed to her anxiety and influenced her later work, particularly her album "Big Sigh". “After that, I had my first ever panic attack and I thought I was dying again, because all your senses shut down and you feel so isolated in that moment. Chronic anxiety is now half my life, basically, and I think when you’ve experienced such a palpable shift from one point to another, there very much is a before and after. It’s something that I really struggle with and that I find deeply sad: what if I’d never had that panic attack? What if my appendix hadn’t burst? Would I even have anxiety?"

At 18, she moved to Brighton, England, where she studied art foundation for a year and planned on earning a degree in fine arts. Instead, she later chose to pursue music full-time.

== Music career ==
=== Early career (2012–2013) ===
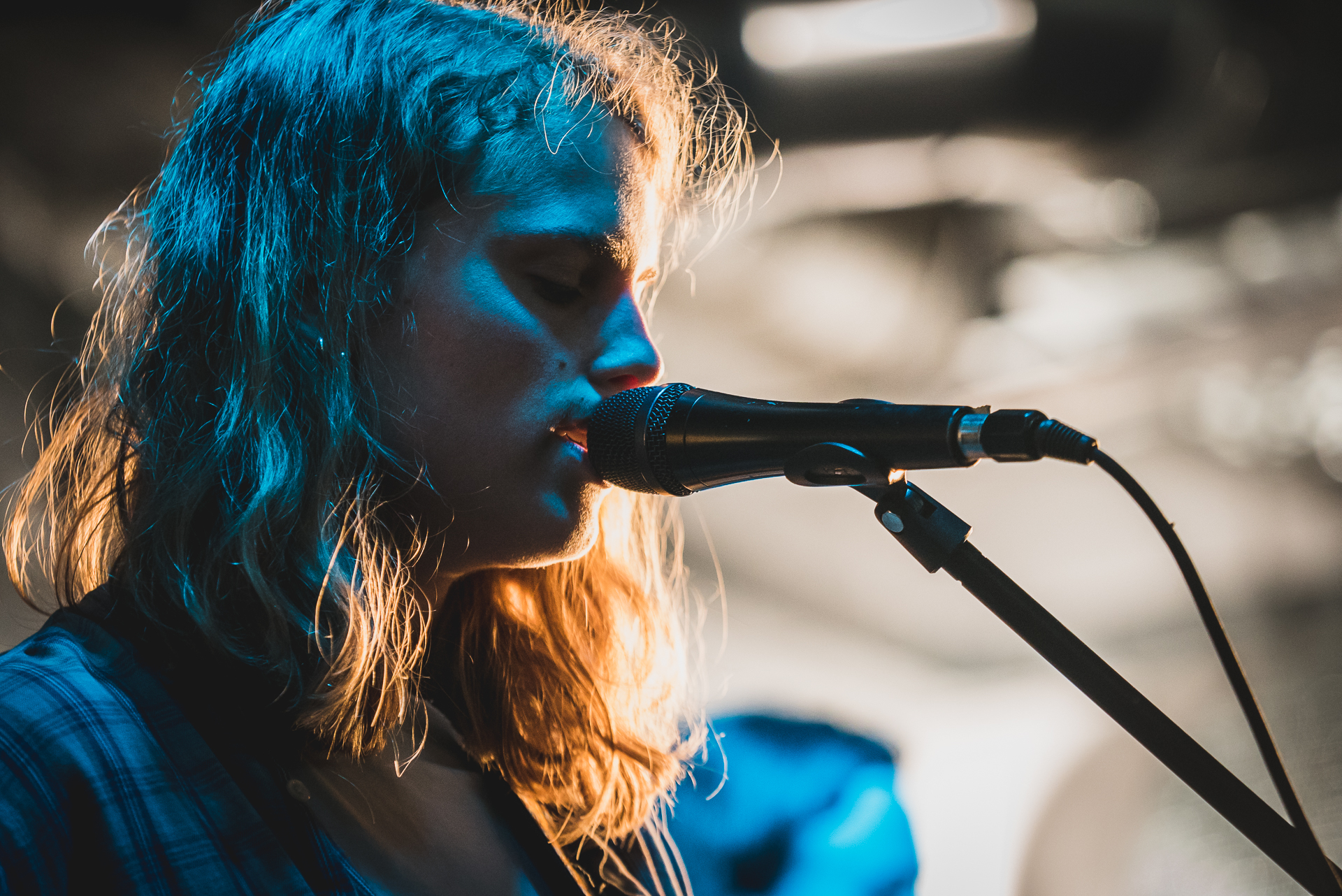
Hackman at Rough Trade

Hackman's first release was an EP of covers, which was available for digital download in October 2012. The following February, she released her first mini-album, That Iron Taste, featuring songs of her own composition. The album was released in physical formats and as a digital download. It was produced by alt-J's Charlie Andrew. In 2013, she toured Australia and Europe as an opening act for Laura Marling, to support the release of That Iron Taste. The music video for her song "Cannibal" was filmed at Bedales School in March 2013. She later released two more EPs, Sugar Blind on 9 December 2013 and Deaf Heat on 4 April 2014, via iTunes. Both EPs contain songs written by Hackman as well as one cover song.

=== Debut album: We Slept at Last (2014–2017) ===
Hackman began recording her full-length debut album in 2014 with producer Charlie Andrew. She debuted new material from the album, including the songs "Skin" and "Ophelia", while on tour in 2013 with Laura Marling. In late September 2014, the album's title was announced as We Slept at Last and was released on 16 February 2015. The album features 12 new songs written by Hackman and does not feature any material from her previous EPs. Hackman embarked on a headlining solo tour throughout the UK in support of the album in November 2014. The album's lead single, "Drown", premiered in mid-October and was officially released on 8 December 2014. On 17 November 2014, "Drown" was announced as a shortlisted contender for DJ Zane Lowe's "Hottest Record of 2014" on BBC Radio 1. It ranked No. 89 out of 100 songs. She also appeared as a featured vocalist on alt-J's song "Warm Foothills", from their second album "This Is All Yours". On 8 January 2015 she premiered the album's second single, "Animal Fear", for DIY Magazine. On 13 January 2015, "Before I Sleep", another track from her debut album, was streamed exclusively on the website Earmilk, as well as her SoundCloud account. Hackman previewed material from the album in the days leading up to its release. The album is available to stream in its entirely on her official SoundCloud account, and features a distinctive blue colour scheme. The deluxe edition of the album includes all of the songs from Hackman's EPs. "Animal Fear" was released as the album's second single on 16 February 2015, the same day as the release of We Slept at Last.

On 18 February 2015, Hackman played material from her debut album at The Cob Gallery in Camden, London. An art exhibit, featuring the album's artwork of 24 photographs, was displayed during the show. She embarked on a solo headlining tour throughout the UK during March and April 2015. Fenne Lily provided support to Hackman during these dates, which were generally well received by the press The tour continued with shows throughout Europe during the spring and summer of 2015.

On 25 June 2015, Laura Marling announced that Hackman and Johnny Flynn would join her on tour for a series of concerts in North America during July and August 2015. The concerts would be Hackman's first time performing material in North America. Hackman's fourth single, "Next Year", was released on 14 August 2015.

The album was generally well-received, with The Guardian's review rating it four out of five stars, and calling Hackman's work "superbly understated and atmospheric", noting that the "unsettling quality" was a distinguishing factor.

=== Second album: I'm Not Your Man (2017) ===
Hackman signed with Sub Pop for her second album, I'm Not Your Man. "Boyfriend", the first single from the album, debuted on Hackman's VEVO channel on 22 February 2017 in the form of a music video. The album features the London band The Big Moon as backing vocalists and instrumentalists. The cover art was designed by Tristan Pigott.

The album was released 2 June 2017. The Guardian's four-star (out of five) review praised Hackman's "sweetly sung cut-glass vocals" and for having "risen from the alt-folk scene". The Observer's review (rating 3/5 stars) called the album "witty, raucous and honest", noting that Hackman, despite a new sound, "keeps the best of her former incarnation", adding to the "balance and variety" of the album. Pitchfork declared the album "bracing" and "darkly funny", "melodically strong" and "full of surprises", giving a rating of 7.5/10.

=== Third album: Any Human Friend (2019) ===
On 23 April 2019, Hackman shared a teaser video with the caption "A _ _ H _ _ _ _ F _ _ _ _ _", hinting at the title of her upcoming third album. The following day, she released the lead single, "I'm Not Where You Are". On 22 May, the album's title was revealed to be Any Human Friend, and it was made available to pre-order. It was released on 9 August 2019. The album was produced by Hackman and David Wrench, and significantly features synthesizers. Hackman has described the lyrical content of the album as "quite sexual" and "blunt, but not offensive". She wanted to write about sexuality in a "unifying and sexy" way, in contrast to sexual lyrics that objectify the subject. The second single from the album, "The One", was released on 13 June 2019. Hackman has described it as "probably the poppiest song I’ve ever written".

The Guardian, in a four-star review, observed that, on Hackman's "most accomplished record to date", she "flits between self-reflection and self-loathing" in "glorious songs" characterised by "a general wry frankness". Pitchfork called the album "a singular, extraordinarily horny, and occasionally bleak pop record", about "those quiet moments of reckoning with what it means to be alive, young, and cautiously enamoured of it all", also observing Hackman, with her "coolly unimpressed alto" as "not interested in being coy or mincing words". The Independent's review calls the album "blunt and bold" with a "dark sexual energy" on which "Hackman’s beatific voice sits atop methodically messy instrumentals".

For this album cycle, Hackman toured in the United Kingdom, Europe and the United States.

=== Fourth album: Covers (2020) ===
This album of covers was produced during Hackman's time in lockdown during the COVID-19 pandemic, including songs from Beyoncé, The Shins, and Elliott Smith. Released on 13 November 2020, the album was noted by NME in its four-star review to be "intimate and inventive", representing "soothing familiarity with the excitement of the new". Hackman "straddles the line between... well-known tunes and something fresher", the reviewer observing that "the results are gorgeous". She shot the music videos for covers in a disused London Swimming pool.

On 19 July 2023, Hackman was featured on the single "Call Me A Lioness", released in celebration of the 2023 FIFA Women's World Cup. The single also featured Olivia Dean and Melanie C, among others.

=== Fifth album: Big Sigh (2024) ===
Big Sigh was released on 12 January 2024, under the Chrysalis Records label. This album features previously released singles like No Caffeine and Slime and contains a total of 10 songs. The album was noted by NME as a "defining moment for one of our most intriguing songwriters". Hackman has since announced tours in the UK, Europe and North America throughout 2024.

== Personal life ==
Hackman currently resides in the East End of London. She was in a four-year relationship with musician Amber Bain, who performs as The Japanese House, until 2018. She is currently in a relationship with Polly Mackey, known professionally as Art School Girlfriend, and as of April 2024, referred to Mackey as her wife.

== Discography ==
=== Studio albums ===
Title	Album details	Peak chart positions
Title	Album details	UK
We Slept at Last	Released: 16 February 2015; Label: Dirty Hit; Formats: CD, LP, digital download	60
I'm Not Your Man	Released: 2 June 2017; Label: AMF, Virgin EMI, Sub Pop; Formats: CD, LP, digital download	74
Any Human Friend	Released: 9 August 2019; Label: AMF, Virgin EMI, Sub Pop; Formats: CD, LP, digital download	42
Covers	Released: 13 November 2020; Label: Sub Pop; Formats: CD, LP, digital download	—
Big Sigh	Released: 12 January 2024; Label: Chrysalis; Formats: CD, LP, digital download, streaming	67
False Dogs	Released: 19 February 2027; Label: Chrysalis; Formats: Digital download, streaming	—

=== Extended plays ===
Title	Extended play details	Notes
Free Covers	Released: October 2012; Format: Digital download	Track listing: No. / Title / Length; 1. / "Burgundy" (Warpaint cover) / 2:51; 2. / "Lithium" (Nirvana cover) / 2:44; 3. / "These Days" (Nico cover) / 2:24; 4. / "Marble House" (The Knife cover) / 3:24; 5. / "Spooky" (Dusty Springfield cover) / 2:56; Total length: / / 14:19
That Iron Taste	Released: 25 February 2013; Label: Dirty Hit; Formats: CD, vinyl, digital download	No. / Title / Length; 1. / "Bath Is Black" / 3:06; 2. / "Mountain Spines" / 3:49; 3. / "Cannibal" / 2:59; 4. / "Retina Television" / 2:44; 5. / "I'll Borrow Time" / 3:05; 6. / "Plans" / 3:38; 7. / "You Come Down" / 2:54; Total length: / / 22:15
Sugar Blind	Released: 9 December 2013; Label: Dirty Hit; Format: Digital download	No. / Title / Length; 1. / "Cinnamon" / 2:52; 2. / "Itchy Teeth" / 3:37; 3. / "Wolf" / 3:20; 4. / "'81" / 2:36; Total length: / / 12:25
Deaf Heat	Released: 14 April 2014; Label: Dirty Hit, Universal; Format: Digital download	No. / Title / Length; 1. / "Tongues" / 2:16; 2. / "Deep Green" / 3:35; 3. / "Call Off the Dogs" / 3:14; 4. / "I Follow Rivers" / 2:46; Total length: / / 11:51
Wonderland	Released: 2 December 2016; Label: Transgressive; Formats: CD, vinyl, digital download	Track listing: No. / Title / Length; 1. / "Intro" / 0:41; 2. / "In the Bleak Midwinter" / 2:49; 3. / "Driving Under Stars" / 3:41; 4. / "O Come O Come Emmanuel" / 3:01; 5. / "Paper Crown" / 3:03; 6. / "Winter Wonderland" / 3:42; Total length: / / 16:57

=== Singles ===
==== As lead artist ====
Title	Year	Album
"You Come Down" / "Mountain Spines"	2012	That Iron Taste
"Bath Is Black"	2013	That Iron Taste
"Cannibal"	2013	That Iron Taste
"Deep Green"	2014	Deaf Heat
"Drown"	2014	We Slept at Last
"Animal Fear"	2015	We Slept at Last
"Ophelia"	2015	We Slept at Last
"Next Year"	2015	We Slept at Last
"Driving Under Stars"	2016	Wonderland
"O Come O Come Emmanuel"	2016	Wonderland
"Boyfriend"	2017	I'm Not Your Man
"My Lover Cindy"	2017	I'm Not Your Man
"Violet"	2017	I'm Not Your Man
"Cigarette"	2017	I'm Not Your Man
"I'm Not Where You Are"	2019	Any Human Friend
"The One"	2019	Any Human Friend
"All Night"	2019	Any Human Friend
"No Caffeine"	2023	Big Sigh
"Hanging"	2023	Big Sigh
"Slime"	2023	Big Sigh

==== As featured artist ====
Title	Year	Album	B-side
"I Hold" (Sivu featuring Marika Hackman)	2013	Non-album single	"Skin" (Marika Hackman featuring Sivu)
"Palm's Backside" (Toothless featuring Marika Hackman)	2016	The Pace of the Passing	"Innocence Is Bliss" (Toothless featuring Marika Hackman)

==== Promotional singles ====
Title	Year	Album
"Time's Been Reckless"	2017	I'm Not Your Man

=== Guest appearances ===
Title	Year	Other performer	Album
"Warm Foothills"	2014	alt-J	This Is All Yours
"O Come, O Come Emmanuel"	2014	None	It's Coming on Christmas 2
"Prisons to Purify"	2015	Sundara Karma	EP II
"River"	2015	None	It's Coming on Christmas 3
"Only Friend"	2016	Oscar	Cut and Paste
"Last Year"	2017	alt-J	RELAXER
"Aware"	2017	Benny Mails	Aware, The Mixtape.

=== Music videos ===
==== As lead artist ====
Title	Year	Director(s)
"You Come Down"	2012	Seth Finegold and Poppy Rogers
"Bath Is Black"	2013	Marika Hackman
"Drown"	2014	Brian Fairbairn and Karl Eccleston
"Animal Fear"	2015	James Partridge
"Ophelia"	2015	Max Knight
"Boyfriend"	2017	Libby Burke Wilde
"My Lover Cindy"	2017	Sam Bailey
"Time's Been Reckless"	2017	Jackson Ducasse
"I'm Not Where You Are"	2019	Will Hooper
"The One"	2019	Louis Bhose
"Hand Solo"	2019	Sam Bailey

==== As featured artist ====
Title	Year	Other artist	Director
"Palm's Backside" (Lyric Video)	2016	Toothless	Kit Monteith
"Palm's Backside"	2016	Toothless	Kit Monteith
"Palm's Backside (Acoustic)"	2016	Toothless	Kit Monteith

==== Guest appearances ====
Title	Year	Artist	Director
"Lilo"	2018	The Japanese House	David East

== Awards and nominations ==
Year	Organisation	Nominated work	Award	Result
2014	UK Blog Sound of 2014	—N/a	—N/a	Won (shared with Banks)
2014	Zane Lowe & BBC Radio 1	"Drown"	"Hottest Record of 2014"	Nominated
