= Big Sigh =

Studio album by Marika Hackman
- Released: 12 January 2024
- Length: 35:37
- Label: Chrysalis
- Producers: Charlie Andrew; Marika Hackman; Sam Petts-Davies

Marika Hackman chronology
Any Human Friend (2019)	Big Sigh (2024)	False Dogs (2027)

Singles from Big Sigh
- 1. "No Caffeine" Released: 8 September 2023; 2. "Hanging" Released: 11 October 2023; 3. "Slime" Released: 7 November 2023; 4. "The Yellow Mile" Released: 10 January 2024

Big Sigh is the fourth studio album by English musician Marika Hackman. It was released on 12 January 2024 through Chrysalis Records.

== Background and singles ==
Following a tough period of time in lockdown, Hackman was left wondering if she would ever write again. After a journey back from a "creative dry spell", Hackman would start producing a new record alongside Sam Petts-Davies and long-term collaborator Charlie Andrew. The musician would also play every instrument except for brass and strings. Compared to its predecessor Any Human Friend (2019), Big Sigh took a wholly different approach on songwriting about themes like "love and sex". Instead of celebrating "sexy fun and visceral, rank hotness", the album talks about the topic in a more "sensitive" and "thoughtful" way. Big Sigh took a "long time to make", an experience she described as "not easy" and had to have it "sit in its own space" after she finished it. Referring to it as the "hardest album" she had to write, it tackles topics including love and loss, mental health and the attempt at finding balance.

The lead single "No Caffeine" was released on 8 September 2023, a song that finds Hackman "in fetal position" struggling with "anxiety" likened to an "abusive partner" while trying to prevent a panic attack. "Hanging" was released as the second single alongside the album announcement on 11 October. The song reflects on a "past relationship" and a subsequent situation that leaves you unable to move "into the next stage of your life".

== Track listing ==
All tracks are written by Marika Hackman.

Big Sigh track listing
No.	Title	Length
1.	"The Ground"	2:31
2.	"No Caffeine"	3:11
3.	"Big Sigh"	4:02
4.	"Blood"	3:49
5.	"Hanging"	3:53
6.	"The Lonely House"	2:29
7.	"Vitamins"	4:12
8.	"Slime"	3:58
9.	"Please Don't Be So Kind"	4:29
10.	"The Yellow Mile"	3:03
Total length:		35:37

== Personnel ==
Musicians

- Marika Hackman – vocals, guitar (tracks 1–5, 7–10); synthesizer (1–5, 7–9), piano (1, 2, 4–9), strings (1, 2, 7), programming (1, 5), percussion (2–5, 7–9), bass guitar (2–5, 8), drums (2, 3, 5, 8), recorder (4), arrangement (5, 7, 9)
- Sam Petts-Davies – synthesizer (tracks 1, 2, 5, 7), drums (5), arrangement (9)
- Richard Watkins – French horn (tracks 1, 2, 5, 7, 9)
- Andy Wood – trombone (tracks 1, 2, 5, 7, 9)
- Dan Newell – trumpet (tracks 1, 2, 5, 7, 9)
- Bruce White – viola (tracks 1, 2, 5, 7)
- Rachel Robson – viola (tracks 1, 2, 5, 7)
- Ali Dods – violin (tracks 1, 2, 5, 7)
- Lucy Wilkins – violin (tracks 1, 2, 5, 7)
- Richard George – violin (tracks 1, 2, 5, 7)
- Rick Koster – violin (tracks 1, 2, 5, 7)
- Ian Burdge – cello (tracks 1, 2, 5, 7)
- Sally Herbert – brass (tracks 1, 2), arrangement (5)
- Alfie Johnson – cello (track 3)

Technical

- Marika Hackman – production
- Charlie Andrew – production, mixing (all tracks); engineering (tracks 1, 3, 6, 8, 10)
- Sam Petts-Davies – production (tracks 1–5, 7–10), engineering (3, 4, 8)
- Emma Marks – engineering (tracks 1, 2)

== Charts ==
Chart performance for Big Sigh
Chart (2024)	Peak position
Scottish Albums (Official Charts)	19
UK Albums (Official Charts)	67
UK Independent Albums (Official Charts)	5
