= Love in the 4th Dimension =

Studio album by the Big Moon
- Released: 7 April 2017
- Studio: Eastcote Studios
- Genres: Indie rock, alternative rock
- Length: 40:12
- Label: Fiction Records
- Producer: Catherine Marks

The Big Moon chronology
Love in the 4th Dimension (2017)	Walking Like We Do (2020)

Singles from Love in the 4th Dimension
- 1. "Cupid" Released: 29 March 2016; 2. "Silent Movie Susie" Released: 27 July 2016; 3. "Formidable" Released: 16 November 2016; 4. "Sucker" Released: 23 February 2017

Love in the 4th Dimension is the debut studio album by British indie rock band the Big Moon, released on 7 April 2017 by Columbia Records and Fiction Records. The album was recorded at Eastcote Studios in London with producer Catherine Marks. The album was recorded across 12 days so the band could go with their first instincts musically. Prior to the album's release the tracks "Cupid", "Silent Movie Susie", "Formidable" and "Sucker" were released as singles, the latter of which being a re-recording of the band's debut single. The band toured Europe in spring 2017 to celebrate the album's release.

== Promotion and release ==
Love in the 4th Dimension was officially announced on 16 November 2016, when the single "Formidable" premiered on Annie Mac's Hottest Record. Despite this the track was actually the third single released from the album. The first single was the song "Cupid" released on 29 March 2016. "Cupid"'s accompanying music video was released a month later released on 24 April. It was the first song the band released after signing to Fiction Records. The track was described by front woman Jules Jackson as being about "when you really really want something or someone and you launch yourself into getting it – preening yourself, preparing, fantasising the blissful future, convincing yourself that you’re ready for it and you bravely throw yourself into a new situation – only to find that despite all that careful planning your nerves can still get the better of you." The second single released was the track "Silent Movie Susie" released on 26 July 2016. The track was premiered on BBC Radio 1 by Huw Stephens. It was described by Robin Murray from Clash Magazine as being "reminiscent of Elastica, or even elements of The Libertines". The third single released was the track "Formidable" which was premiered by Radio 1 on Annie Mac's Hottest Record. It was also released on a 7" vinyl on 13 January 2017 with the track "Hold This" being the B-side. Jules described the song as being about "being strong for someone who's going through a hard time, and it's saying 'I'm here, you can talk to me, I'll be strong for you, you don't have to hold it inside'. The fourth single released was the track "Sucker", a re-recording of the band's debut single originally released on 29 April 2015.

== Critical reception ==
Professional ratings
Aggregate scores
Source	Rating
Metacritic	77/100
Review scores
Source	Rating
DIY	5/5 stars
GIGsoup	95%
The Guardian	4/5 stars
The Line of Best Fit	8.5/10
Loud and Quiet	6/10
Q	6/10
The Times	4/5 stars

Love in the 4th Dimension received positive reviews from music critics. At Metacritic, which assigns a normalised rating out of 100 to reviews from mainstream critics, the album received a positive score of 77, based on five reviews.

Harriet Gibson of The Guardian said "The golden age of indie might be over, but The Big Moon are resuscitating its corpse for one last hurrah", and added that the band "amplifies the emotional carnage" of "nostalgia for noughties". Will Hodgkinson of The Times called the album "a rousing ode to being young and having fun".

Reef Younis of Loud and Quiet said that the album "captures the kind of happy exuberance you get from watching Pixar films, remembering criminally underrated Brit-pop acts and/or catching a favourite song on an episode of Teachers".

=== Accolades ===
Publication	Accolade	Year	Rank	Ref.
NME	NME's Albums of the Year 2017	2017	44	
Rough Trade	Albums of the Year	2017	7	

== Track listing ==
All tracks written by Jules Jackson.

No.	Title	Length
1.	"Sucker"	3:41
2.	"Pull the Other One"	3:31
3.	"Cupid"	3:43
4.	"Formidable"	2:55
5.	"Bonfire"	3:47
6.	"The Road"	4:00
7.	"Happy New Year"	3:22
8.	"Silent Movie Susie"	3:23
9.	"Love in the 4th Dimension"	3:42
10.	"Zeds"	4:03
11.	"The End"	4:12

Bonus tracks
No.	Title	Length
12.	"Hold This"	3:06
13.	"The Undead"	4:13
14.	"Eureka Moment"	3:17
15.	"Something Beautiful"	3:29

== Personnel ==
Credits adapted from Love in the 4th Dimension liner notes.

The Big Moon

- Juliette Jackson – guitar, vocals, songwriting
- Soph Nathann – guitar, vocals
- Celia Archer – bass, vocals
- Fern Ford – drums

Additional musicians

- Beatrice Archer – violin (track 11)
- Nick Holland – cello (track 11)

Design

- Charlotte Patmore – photography
- Stewart Armstrong – design
- Alice Waltz – pattern design

Production

- Catherine Marks – production (1, 2, 3, 4, 5, 7, 8, 9, 10, 11, 12, 13), mixing (track 3)
- Juliette Jackson – co-production (1, 2, 5, 6, 7, 9, 10, 11, 13), production (track 15)
- The Big Moon – production (track 6, 12, 14)
- Adam 'Cecil' Bartlett – additional production (track 9, 10, 11, 13), engineering (track 1, 2, 5, 7, 9, 13)
- Andy Hughes – engineering assistance (track 1, 2, 5, 7, 9, 13)
- Craig Silvey – mixing (track 1, 2, 4, 5, 6, 7, 8, 9, 13)
- Max Prior – mixing assistance (track 1, 2, 5, 6, 7, 9, 13)
- John Catlin – engineering (track 3, 4, 8)
- Kristian Donaldson – engineering assistance (track 3)
- Richie Kennedy – engineering assistance (track 4, 8)
- Eduardo de la Paz Canel – mixing (track 12), mixing assistance (track 4, 8)
- George Murphy – engineering (track 6, 15), mixing (track 15)
- Greg Calvi – mastering
- Mark Bishop – engineering (track 12)
- Josh Faulkner – engineering assistance (track 12)
- John Davis – mastering (track 12, 15)
- Rory Attwell – mastering (track 13, 14), production (track 14), engineering (track 14), mixing (track 14)

Recording

- Recorded at Eastcote Studios

== Charts ==
Chart (2017)	Peak position
UK Albums (Official Charts)	66
