= Here Is Everything =

Studio album by the Big Moon
- Released: 14 October 2022
- Length: 46:32
- Label: Fiction
- Producer: Adam Barlett

The Big Moon chronology
| Walking Like We Do (2020) | Here Is Everything (2022) | Forever (2026) |

Singles from Here Is Everything
- 1. "Wide Eyes" Released: 13 July 2022; 2. "Trouble" Released: 5 September 2022; 3. "This Love" Released: 5 October 2022

Here Is Everything is the third studio album by British indie rock band the Big Moon, released on 14 October 2022 via Fiction Records.

== Background ==
In January 2020, the Big Moon released their second studio album Walking Like We Do to positive reviews.

The Big Moon were getting ready to release their follow-up to Walking Like We Do in early 2021, including being about to shoot the music video for the first single. However, the band "decided to put the brakes on and give it some breathing space", according to Juliette Jackson. Jackson giving birth to a son forced her to reconsider the project.

== Singles ==
The lead single "Wide Eyes" was released alongside the announcement of the album on 13 July 2022. The single "Wide Eyes" was written by Jackson in late 2021, after the birth of her son, alongside Jessica Winter. Jackson said that she "was desperate to write a really big, happy song" with "Wide Eyes" and said that Winter's contributions "helped me turn those jumbled feelings into a song".

The second single from the album titled "Trouble" was released on 5 September 2022. The track deals with Jackson's trauma surrounding giving birth. Clash described the track as a "mature, melodic, and insightful look at motherhood".

The album's third single, "This Love" was released on 5 October 2022.

== Critical reception ==
Professional ratings
Aggregate scores
| Source | Rating |
|---|---|
| Metacritic | 77/100 |
Review scores
| Source | Rating |
| Clash | 8/10 |
| DIY | 4.5/5 stars |
| Gigwise | 9/10 stars |
| The Line of Best Fit | 7/10 |
| Loud and Quiet | 7/10 |
| NME | 4/5 stars |

Upon its release, Here Is Everything received positive reviews from music critics. At Metacritic, which assigns a normalized rating out of 100 to reviews from mainstream critics, the album has an average score of 77, based on 7 critical reviews, indicating "generally favourable reviews". In a positive review, Kyann-Sian Williams of NME rated Here Is Everything four out of five stars, calling it "emotive and glossy" and "gives space to breathe in this busy world". A review for The Line of Best Fit states that, with Here Is Everything, The Big Moon have "shown us their rawest moments and the deepest parts of their psyche" in its introspective discussion of motherhood.

== Track listing ==
All tracks are written by Juliette Jackson unless otherwise noted.

Here Is Everything track listing
| No. | Title | Writer(s) | Producer(s) | Length |
|---|---|---|---|---|
| 1. | "2 Lines" | | | 4:00 |
| 2. | "Wide Eyes" | Juliette Jackson; Jessica Winter | Adam Barlett; Juliette Jackson; Soph Nathan; Fern Ford; Jessica Winter | 3:30 |
| 3. | "Daydreaming" | | | 4:03 |
| 4. | "This Love" | | | 4:53 |
| 5. | "Sucker Punch" | | | 4:30 |
| 6. | "My Very Best" | | | 4:24 |
| 7. | "Ladye Bay" | | | 4:33 |
| 8. | "Trouble" | | | 3:51 |
| 9. | "High & Low" | | | 3:35 |
| 10. | "Magic" | | | 4:02 |
| 11. | "Satellites" | | | 5:11 |
| Total length: | | | | 46:32 |

Expanded Edition bonus tracks
| No. | Title | Writer(s) | Length |
|---|---|---|---|
| 12. | "Round Forever" | Celia Archer | 4:45 |
| 13. | "Summer Still Comes" | | 4:35 |
| Total length: | | | 55:52 |

== Personnel ==
The Big Moon

- Juliette Jackson – vocals, guitars
- Soph Nathan – background vocals, guitars, bass
- Celia Archer – background vocals, keyboards, piano, bass
- Fern Ford – background vocals, keyboards, drums

Musicians

- Jessica Winter – synthesisers
- Annie Leeth-strings

Production

- Adam Barlett – producer
- Ben H. Allen-producer
- Kevin Tuffy – mastering engineer
- Matt Wiggins – mixing engineer
- Marcus Locock – assistant mixing engineer

== Charts ==
Chart performance for Here Is Everything
| Chart (2022) | Peak position |
|---|---|
| Scottish Albums (Official Charts) | 10 |
| UK Albums (Official Charts) | 9 |
| UK Independent Albums (Official Charts) | 3 |
