= Fiona Stewart (event director) =

Festival director (born 1960)

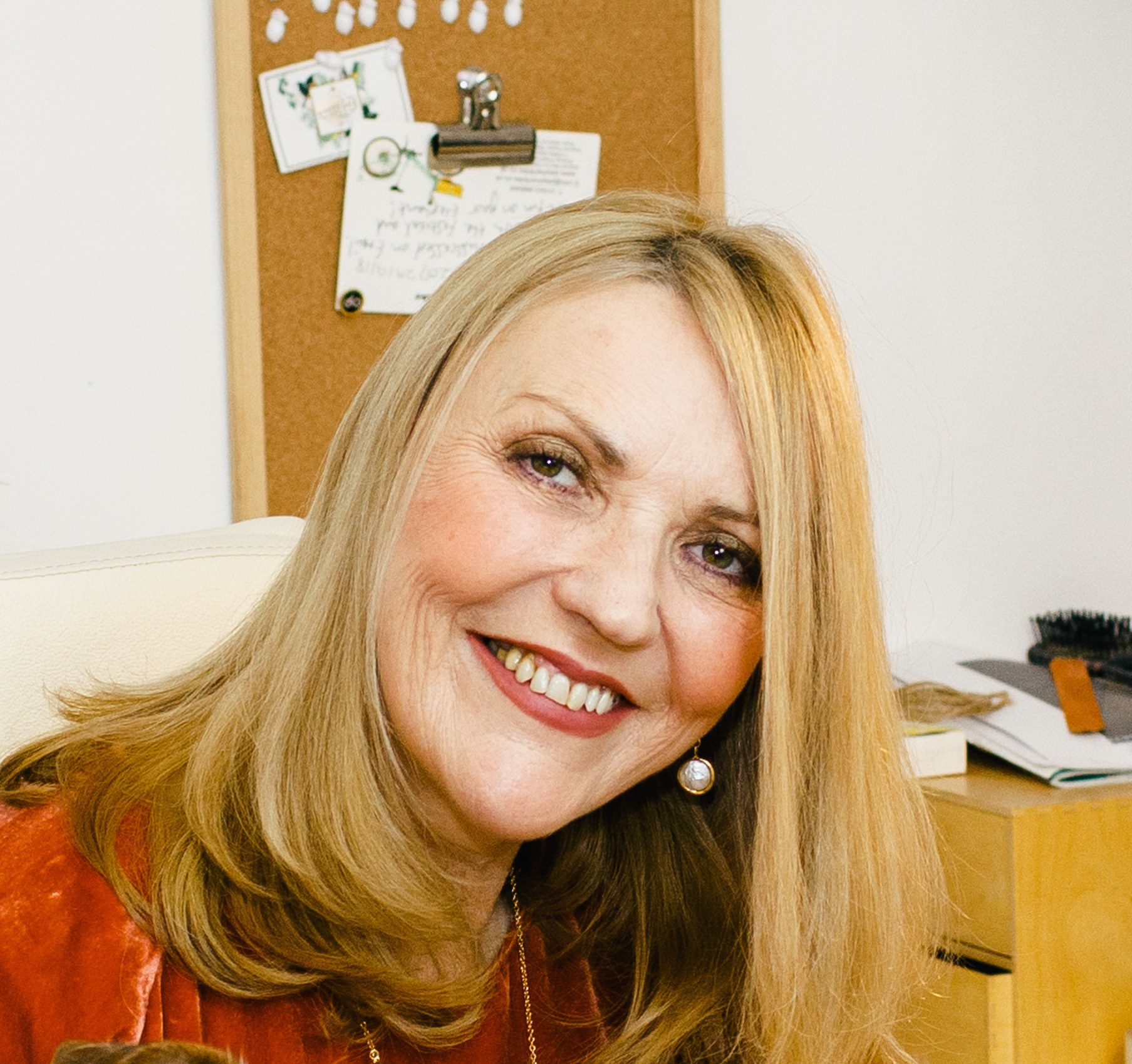
- Stewart in 2020
- Born: 1960 (age 65–66)
- Occupation: Festival director
- Known for: Green Man Festival, The Big Chill (music festival)

Fiona Stewart is managing director and owner of the Green Man Festival, an annual independent music festival in Wales. She also sits as chair of the Green Man Trust, a charitable organisation. Stewart has worked as a consultant for the British Council and the Foreign Office. She has previously worked at Glastonbury Festival and Big Chill.

== Early career ==
Stewart began her career in the 1980s working in London’s hospitality and music scenes, including roles in clubs and early production work. She later worked as a freelance producer and gained experience at major events including Glastonbury Festival.

She went on to become festival manager of the Big Chill festival, where she oversaw its expansion from several thousand attendees to tens of thousands in the early 2000s. During this period, she helped develop the concept of the “boutique festival”, emphasising curated programming, high-quality food, and a more intimate audience experience.

== Green Man Festival ==
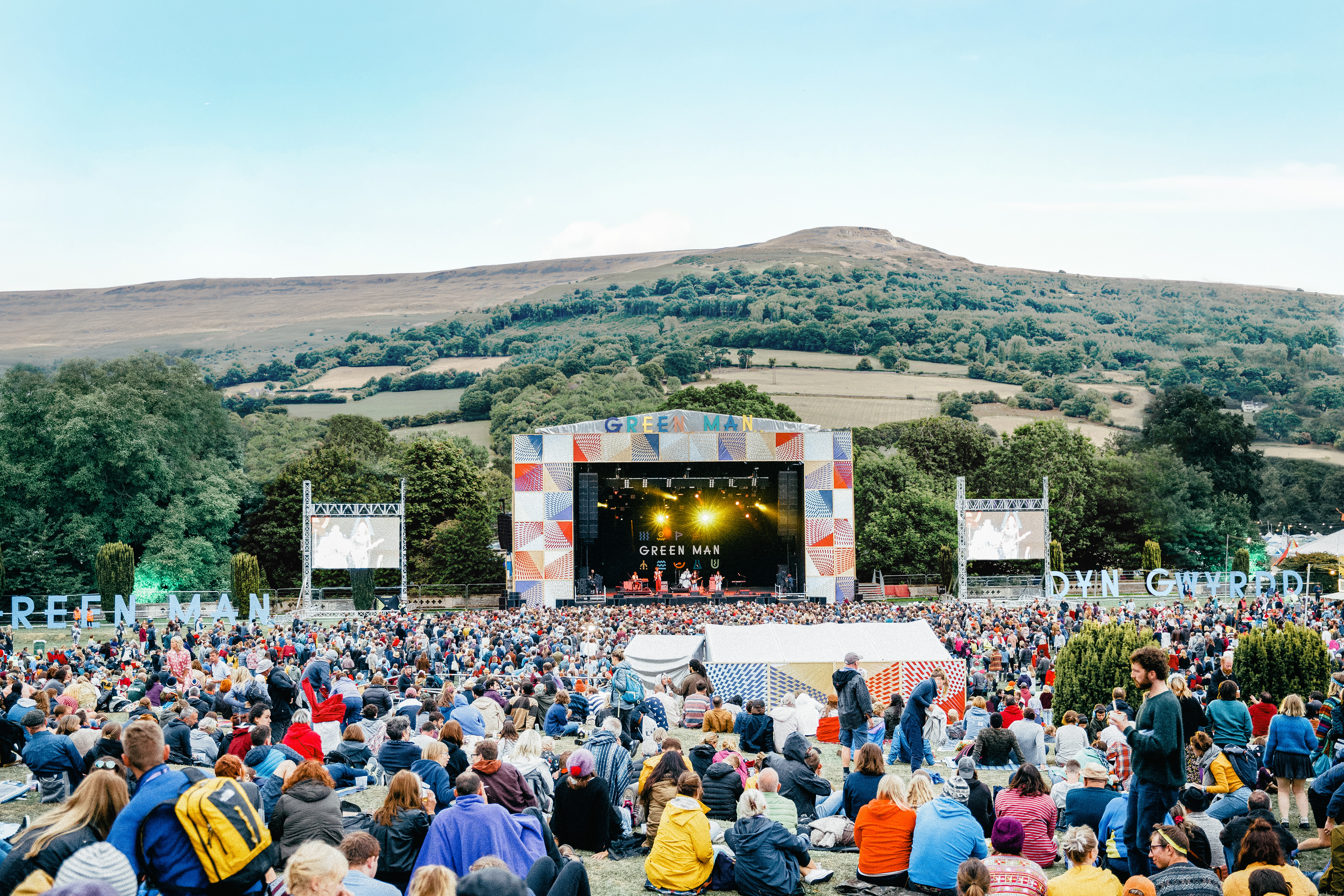
Green Man Festival's Mountain Stage in 2018

Stewart is managing director and owner of the Green Man Festival, one of the largest independent music festivals in the UK, which takes place every year on the Glanusk Park estate near Crickhowell, in the Brecon Beacons in Wales. Alongside Emily Eavis of Glastonbury Festival she is one of the few female festival directors and she is the only female owner of an independent festival. The festival began in 2003 and by 2018 it welcomed 25,000 guests and Stewart has maintained the festival’s independence in an industry dominated by large entertainment corporations. Artists playing at the festival have included Bon Iver, Fleet Foxes, Hot Chip, Robert Plant and Super Furry Animals. In 2018, Green Man Festival was found to contribute an annual £10.4 million to the Welsh economy and each year the festival sells out months in advance.

== Green Man Trust ==
Stewart founded the Green Man Trust in 2014 as the charitable arm of the Green Man Festival, with the aim of extending the festival’s community and cultural activity into year-round programmes. The charity focuses on supporting communities in Wales through initiatives in the arts, education, skills development, and environmental engagement.

The Trust delivers community grant funding, training placements, and arts development programmes, and supports projects aimed at improving access to opportunities in rural and economically disadvantaged areas. It also runs initiatives relating to science communication and climate awareness.

In interviews, Stewart has described the Trust as being informed by her personal experiences, including periods of homelessness earlier in her life, which influenced her interest in social inclusion and access to opportunity. The Trust operates independently as a registered charity but remains closely linked to the Green Man Festival, providing a year-round extension of its cultural and community work.

== Other Work ==
Stewart has overseen or contributed to diverse range of sectors, including:

- Science engagement – development of Einstein’s Garden, a science and environment-focused programme at the Green Man Festival combining scientific communication with arts programming.
- Training and skills development – delivery of placements and work-based learning opportunities within festival operations and creative industries pathways.
- Wellbeing and health – including initiatives exploring wellbeing, environment, and outdoor cultural engagement within festival programming.
- Tourism development – supporting the positioning of the Green Man Festival as a contributor to Welsh cultural tourism and regional economic activity.
- Beverage – developing and launching her own Welsh alcohol beverage brand.

== International Engagement ==
In addition to her work with the Green Man Festival, Stewart has also undertaken international engagement work focused on using Green Man as a cultural asset for Wales and the UK. She has supported cultural and economic development within the creative industries, including projects and exploratory collaborations in countries such as Cuba and Kyrgyzstan.

Stewart has acted as a consultant for the UK Foreign Office, advising on how to engage with new territories and the development of creative industries internationally. She has contributed to a range of cultural and public initiatives, including producing the London 2012 Cultural Olympiad in Newport, Wales and participation in advisory roles relating to the development of the creative industries sector in Wales.

== Awards and Legacy ==
Stewart has received several industry awards for her contribution to festivals and live events:

- Outstanding Achievement Award, UK Festival Awards (2013)
- BBC Woman’s Hour Music Power List (2018)
- Access All Areas Editor’s Award, Access All Areas Awards (2024)
- St David Award Nomination for Culture (2019)

Stewart has been associated with the development of boutique festival formats, which prioritises audience experience, independent programming, and ethical or sustainable practices. Her work has influenced festival models internationally, and systems she introduced, such as event control and operational frameworks, have been adopted across the industry globally.
