= Deathcrash =

English Rock band

- Origin: London, United Kingdom
- Genres: Rock; slowcore; post-rock
- Years active: 2019–present
- Labels: untitled (recs), Fire Talk
- Website: www.deathcrash.com

Deathcrash (sometimes styled as deathcrash) is a London-based rock band. The band consists of members Tiernan Banks (vocals, guitar), Patrick Fitzgerald (bass), Matthew Weinberger (guitar), and Noah Bennett (drums).

== Career ==
In April 2019, Deathcrash released their first single, "Slumber", via Warm Laundry Records. On 12 July 2019, the band released their first EP, Sundown (A Collection of Home Recordings). On 7 October 2020, Deathcrash released their second EP, People thought my windows were stars, via untitled (recs).

On 28 January 2022, the group released their debut album, Return. It received critical acclaim by the press in the UK and the US.

On 17 March 2023, Deathcrash released their second studio album, Less, via Fire Talk in the United States and untitled (recs) in the United Kingdom. It was recorded over two weeks in the Outer Hebrides at Black Bay Studios – an old crab factory renovated into the most remote recording studio in the UK. The album received positive reviews from critics. In November 2023, the quartet released Less+, an expanded version of their second album with previously unreleased bonus material, remixes, and various reworks.

== Musical style ==
Deathcrash's music has been described as slowcore and post-rock with critics also noting influences from doom metal and emo.

The band's musical style has been compared to Mogwai, Codeine, and Low.

== Discography ==
=== Studio albums ===
- Return (2022)
- Less (2023)
- Somersaults (2026)

=== EPs ===
- Sundown (A Collection of Home Recordings) (2019)
- People thought my windows were stars (2020)

=== Singles ===
- "Slumber" (2019)
- "Bones" (2019)
- "People thought my windows were stars" (2020)
- "Blind" (2020)
- ”Horses” (2021)
- ”Unwind” (2021)
- ”Doomcrash” (2022)
- ”Empty Heavy” (2023)
- ”Duffy’s” (2023)
- “And Now I Am Lit” (2023)
- ”Hits” (2023)
- ”Duffy’s (Mandy, Indiana Remix)” (2023)
- ”Triumph” (2025)
- ”Somersaults” (2026)
- ”NYC” (2026)
