= The Big Moon =

English rock band

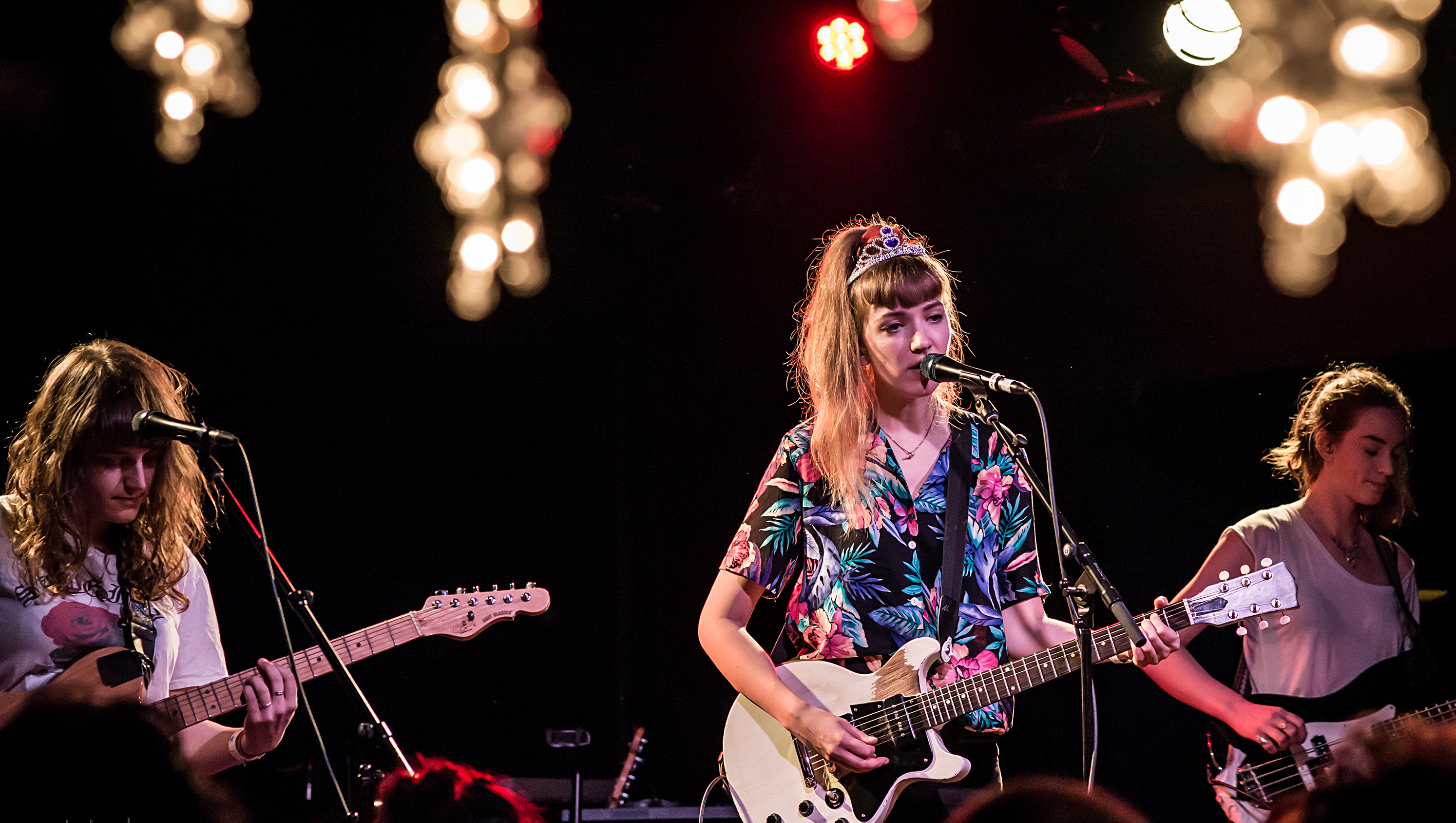
- The Big Moon performing at The Echo in Los Angeles in 2016. From left to right: Soph Nathan, Juliette Jackson, Celia Archer.

Background information
- Origin: London, England
- Genre: Indie rock
- Years active: 2014–present
- Label: Fiction
- Members: Juliette Jackson; Soph Nathan; Celia Archer; Fern Ford
- Website: thebigmoon.co.uk

The Big Moon are a British indie rock band, formed in 2014 in London by frontwoman Juliette Jackson. Their debut album, Love in the 4th Dimension, was released on 6 April 2017, containing a number of tracks previously released on their EP The Road. The album was shortlisted for the prestigious Mercury Prize in 2017. They are signed to Fiction Records and have toured internationally. They supported Pixies on their 2019 UK tour.

== History ==
The Big Moon were formed in London, England, in 2014 by lead singer Juliette Jackson, guitarist Soph Nathan, bassist Celia Archer, and drummer Fern Ford. The band gained exposure on a co-headline tour in October 2015 with fellow London bands VANT and Inheaven. Following that tour, they supported artists The Maccabees, Ezra Furman, and The Vaccines. In 2016, the band signed to Fiction Records. In March, they released their debut EP, The Road, and the single "Cupid". In August 2016, the group released a cover version of Madonna's "Beautiful Stranger".

On 16 December 2016, the band announced their debut album Love in the 4th Dimension, and released new lead single "Formidable". The group were play-listed by BBC Radio 1 in July 2016. The album, produced by Catherine Marks, was released on 7 April 2017 by Fiction and Columbia Records, and was shortlisted for that year's Mercury Prize.

The Big Moon played on Marika Hackman's album I'm Not Your Man, released in June 2017. They supported the Pixies on their 2019 UK tour. The band's second album, Walking Like We Do, produced with Ben H. Allen, was released on 10 January 2020 by Fiction. On 26 February 2020, the band were announced as the Official Record Store Day Ambassadors of 2020.

The band had begun recording a third album in early 2021, but decided to delay it in light of Juliette Jackson's pregnancy. After giving birth, Jackson began writing with singer-songwriter Jessica Winter, and the band began recording in Fern Ford's home studio and co-produced the album with Adam "Cecil" Bartlett, who had been an engineer on Love in the 4th Dimension. The album, Here Is Everything, was officially announced on 13 July 2022, alongside the release of its first single "Wide Eyes", and was given a release date of 14 October 2022. A second single, "Trouble", was released on 5 September 2022. That same month the band began a headlining tour, which kicked off with a show at Finsbury Park alongside George Ezra.

== Band members ==
- Juliette Jackson – lead vocals, guitar, songwriting (2014–present)
- Soph Nathan – guitar, vocals (2014–present)
- Celia Archer – bass guitar, vocals (2014–present)
- Fern Ford – drums (2014–present)

== Discography ==
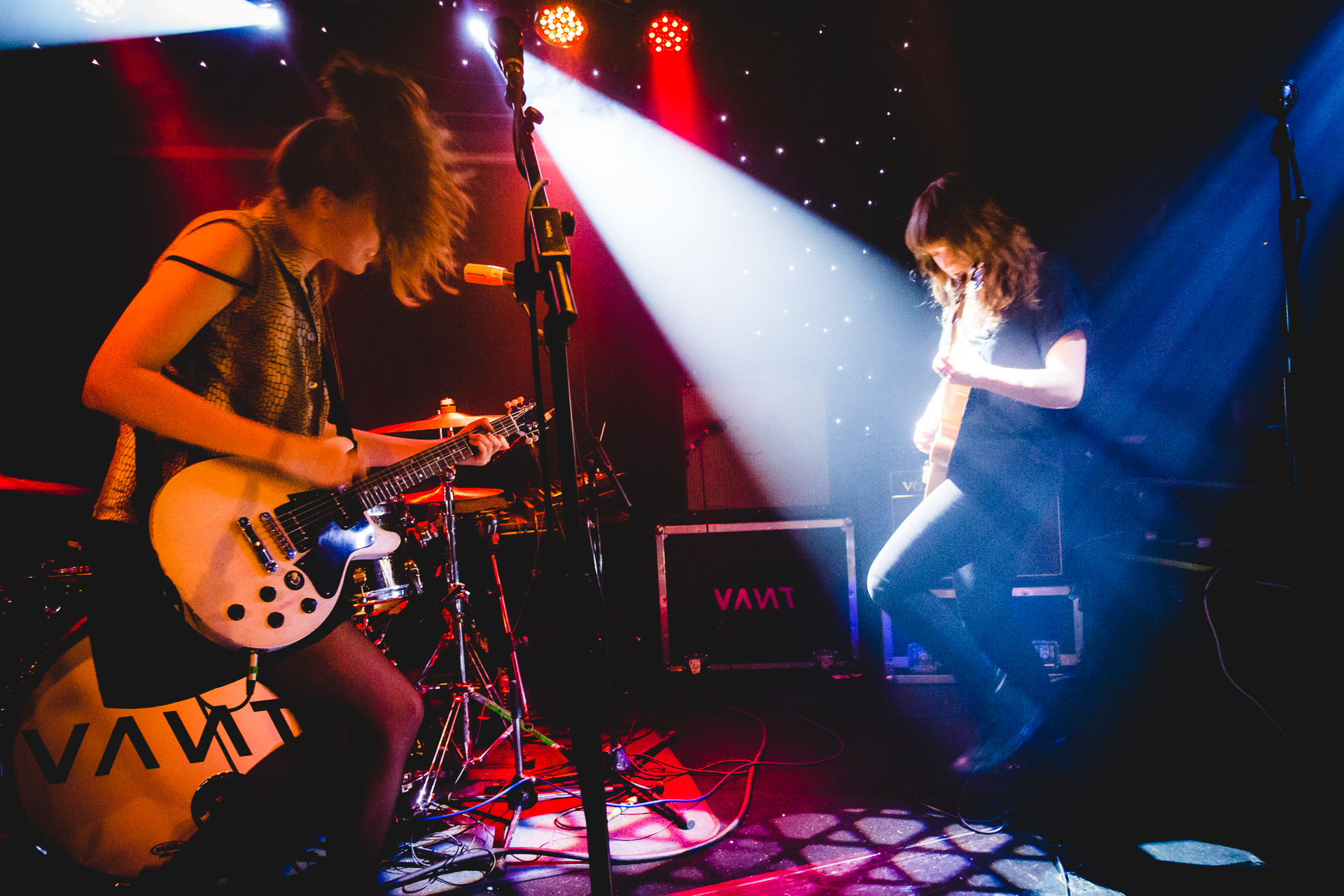
The Big Moon at Dingwalls in London, 2015

=== Studio albums ===
Title	Details	Peak chart positions	
Title	Details	UK	SCO
Love in the 4th Dimension	Released: 7 April 2017; Label: Fiction, Columbia; Formats: CD, digital download, streaming, vinyl	66	70
Walking Like We Do	Released: 10 January 2020; Label: Fiction; Formats: CD, digital download, streaming, vinyl	19	21
Here Is Everything	Released: 14 October 2022; Label: Fiction; Formats: CD, digital download, streaming, vinyl	9	10
Forever	Released 30 October 2026		
"—" denotes an album that did not chart, or was not released in that country.

=== Extended plays ===
Title	EP details
The Road	Released: 1 April 2016; Label: Fiction, Columbia; Format: digital download, streaming
Acoustic	Released: 24 November 2017; Label: Fiction, Columbia; Format: digital download, streaming

=== Singles ===
Title	Year	Peak chart positions		Album
Title	Year	UK Sales	SCO	Album
"The Road"	2015	— (Note: "The Road" did not enter the UK Singles Chart, but peaked at number 34 on the UK Physical Singles Chart Top 100.)	—	The Road
"Sucker"	2015	—	—	The Road
"Nothing Without You"	2015	—	—	The Road
"Cupid"	2016	— (Note: "Cupid" did not enter the UK Singles Chart, but peaked at number three on the UK Physical Singles Chart Top 100.)	—	Love in the 4th Dimension
"Silent Movie Susie"	2016	— (Note: "Silent Movie Susie" did not enter the UK Singles Chart, but peaked at number 10 on the UK Physical Singles Chart Top 100.)	—	Love in the 4th Dimension
"It's the Most Wonderful Time of the Year"	2016	—	—	Non-album single
"Formidable"	2016	— (Note: "Formidable" did not enter the UK Singles Chart, but peaked at number 37 on the UK Physical Singles Chart Top 100.)	—	Love in the 4th Dimension
"Sucker"	2017	—	—	Love in the 4th Dimension
"Hold This"	2017	—	—	Non-album single
"Pull The Other One"	2017	—	—	Love in the 4th Dimension
"Happy New Year"	2017	—	—	Love in the 4th Dimension
"It's Easy Then"	2019	—	—	Walking Like We Do
"Your Light"	2019	56	55	Walking Like We Do
"Take a Piece"	2019	— (Note: "Take a Piece" did not enter the UK Singles Chart, but peaked at number 12 on the UK Physical Singles Chart Top 100.)	—	Walking Like We Do
"Carol of the Bells"	2019	—	—	Non-album single
"Barcelona"	2020	—	—	Walking Like We Do
"Why"	2020	—	—	Walking Like We Do
"Wide Eyes"	2022	—	—	Here Is Everything
"Trouble"	2022	—	—	Here Is Everything
"This Love"	2022	—	—	Here Is Everything
"—" denotes a recording that did not chart or was not released in that territory.
