= Tristan Pigott =

English artist

Tristan Pigott is a figurative artist based in London. His art featured in numerous magazines, shows and galleries. He graduated from Camberwell College of Arts in 2012.

Haaretz featured a painting of Pigott based upon social media trends and narcissism.

In 2015, he was shortlisted for the BP Portrait Award with the National Portrait Gallery, London. The same year he made a portrait of actress Sophie Kennedy Clark.
