= Pitchfork Music Festival =

American annual summer music festival held in Chicago

- Genre: Alternative rock; indie rock; electronic; hip hop
- Dates: Third weekend of July (Chicago); Last weekend of October or first weekend of November (Paris)
- Locations: Union Park, Chicago (2006–2019, 2021–2024); Grande Halle de la Villette, Paris, France (2011–2019, 2021–present)
- Years active: 2006–2019, 2021–present
- Founders: Pitchfork, Mike Reed, Chris Kaskie, Ryan Schreiber
- Website: pitchforkmusicfestival.com

Pitchfork Music Festival was an annual music festival in Union Park in Chicago, Illinois, organized by the online magazine Pitchfork. Starting in 2011, the festival announced a branch staged in Paris at Grande halle de la Villette. The festival, which is normally held over three days (Friday, Saturday, and Sunday) in July, focuses primarily on artists and bands from the alternative rock, hip hop, electronic and dance music genres, although it has also ranged into hardcore punk, experimental rock and jazz in its lineups. A festival planned for Berlin at Tempodrom in 2020 was cancelled.

In addition to music, Pitchfork Festival also includes food, beverages, art, and gig posters from local, regional, and national vendors. In November 2024, Condé Nast announced that the Chicago Pitchfork Music Festival was permanently closing, though the fate of the Paris branch is unclear.

== Chicago ==
Pitchfork Festival in Chicago annually hosted a record fair that is organized and managed by CHIRP Radio, a Chicago community radio station.

=== 2024 ===
The 2024 festival was held on July 19–21 at Union Park in Chicago. The headliners were Jamie xx, Alanis Morissette, and Black Pumas. In November 2024, Pitchfork announced that the Chicago Pitchfork Music Festival was permanently closing, but that it would "continue to produce events" in the future.

=== 2023 ===
The 2023 festival was held on July 21–23 at Union Park in Chicago. The headliners were the Smile, Big Thief, and Bon Iver.

=== 2022 ===
The 2022 festival was held on July 15–17 at Union Park in Chicago. The headliners were the National, Mitski and The Roots.

=== 2021 ===
The 2021 festival was held on September 10–12 at Union Park in Chicago. The edition was headlined by Erykah Badu, Phoebe Bridgers and St. Vincent.

=== 2020 ===
The 2020 Pitchfork Festival was cancelled due to the COVID-19 pandemic.

The artists and bands that were scheduled to perform at the 2020 festival are listed below. The headliners were scheduled to be the Yeah Yeah Yeahs, Run the Jewels, and The National.

Friday: Jehnny Beth, Deafheaven, Dehd, Fennesz, Femdot, the Fiery Furnaces, Hop Along, Kaina, Angel Olsen, Sophie, Spellling, Tim Hecker & the Konoyo Ensemble, Waxahatchee, and Yeah Yeah Yeahs

Saturday: BadBadNotGood, Boy Scouts, Danny Brown, Cat Power, Dave, Divino Niño, Ezra Collective, Margaux, Oso Oso, Run the Jewels, Thundercat, Twin Peaks, Sharon Van Etten, Tierra Whack

Sunday: Big Thief, Phoebe Bridgers, DJ Nate, Dogleg, Dustin Laurenzi's Snaketime, Kim Gordon, the Hecks, Mariah the Scientist, Maxo Kream, The National, Caroline Polachek, Rapsody, Faye Webster, Yaeji

=== 2019 ===
The 2019 festival was held July 19–21 at Union Park in Chicago. The headliners were Haim, the Isley Brothers, and Robyn.

=== 2018 ===
The 2018 festival was held July 20–22 at Union Park in Chicago. The headliners were Tame Impala, Fleet Foxes, and Ms. Lauryn Hill.

=== 2017 ===
The 2017 festival was held July 14–16 at Union Park in Chicago. The headliners were LCD Soundsystem, A Tribe Called Quest, and Solange.

=== 2016 ===
The 2016 Pitchfork Music Festival took place on July 15–17 at Union Park in Chicago.

=== 2015 ===
The 2015 Pitchfork Music Festival was held on July 17–19 at Union Park in Chicago. The event's headliners were Wilco, Sleater-Kinney, and Chance the Rapper.

=== 2014 ===
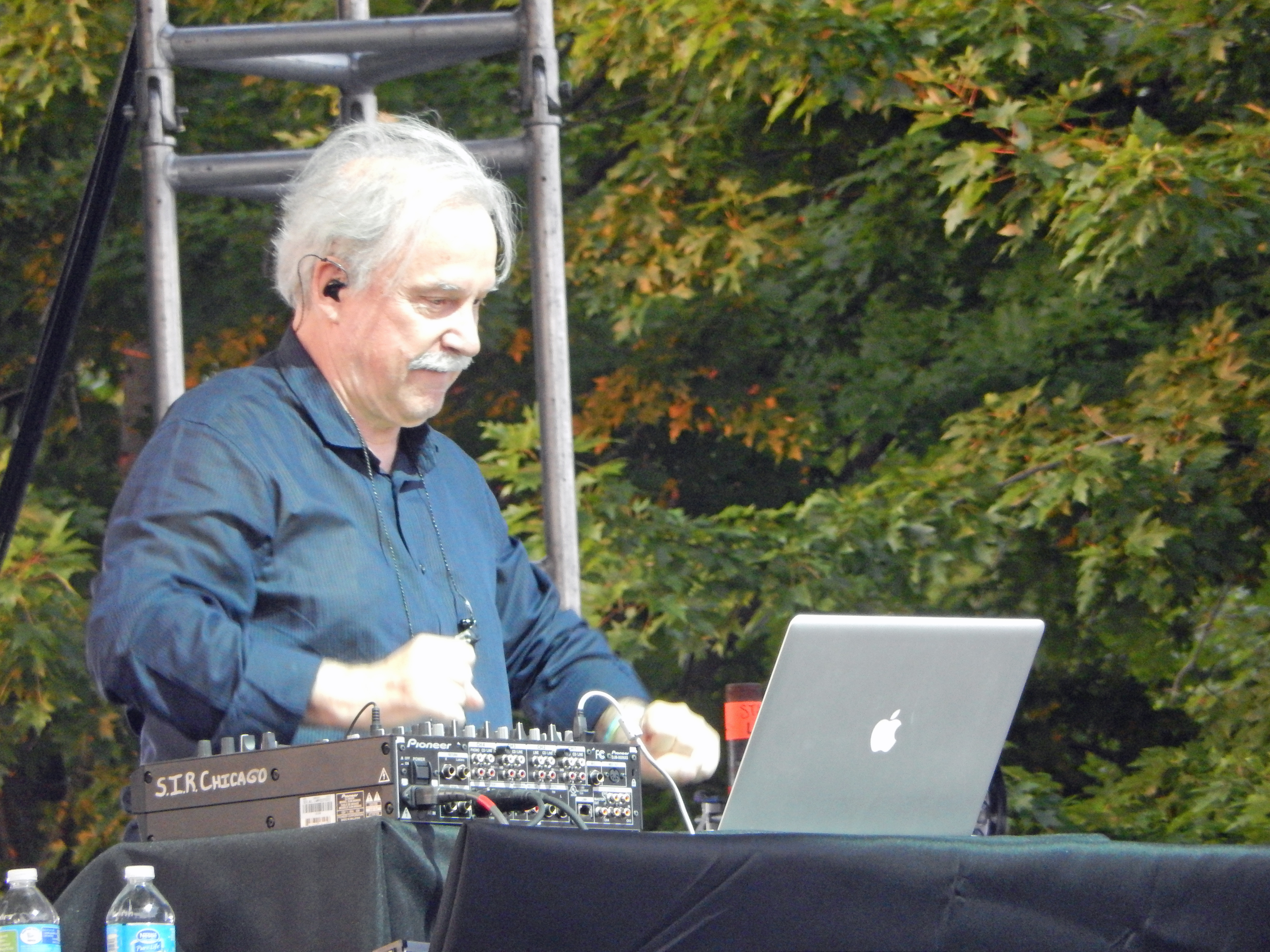
Italian record producer Giorgio Moroder at Pitchfork Music Festival

The 2014 Pitchfork Music Festival was held on July 18–20 at Union Park in Chicago. The event's headliners were Beck, Neutral Milk Hotel, and Kendrick Lamar. Three-day passes for the festival sold out by the beginning of April.

=== 2013 ===
The 2013 Pitchfork Music Festival was held on July 19–21 at Union Park in Chicago. The event's headliners were Björk, Belle & Sebastian, and R. Kelly.

=== 2012 ===
The 2012 Pitchfork Music Festival was held on July 13–15 at Union Park in Chicago. Three day passes went on sale March 9 and sold out by the end of the month. The headliners were Feist, Godspeed You! Black Emperor, and Vampire Weekend.

=== 2011 ===
The 2011 Pitchfork Music Festival was held on July 15–17 at Union Park. Three-day passes for the event sold out in one day. The festival was headlined by Animal Collective, Fleet Foxes and TV on the Radio.

=== 2010 ===
The fifth annual Pitchfork Music Festival was held on July 16–18 at Union Park. Three-day passes for the festival sold out in under a week. 2010 marked the first and only year that the festival included a stand-up comedy stage.

=== 2009 ===
The 2009 Pitchfork Music Festival was held July 17–19, 2009. On Friday night all of the performing bands played sets consisting of songs voted for online by ticket-holders in an event Pitchfork called "Write the Night: Set Lists by Request."

=== 2008 ===
The 2008 Pitchfork Music Festival was held July 18–20, 2008. Three-day passes for the event sold out in May. On Friday night the promotion company All Tomorrow's Parties again collaborated with Pitchfork to present a "Don't Look Back" stage, on which all of the evening's bands performed one of their classic albums in its entirety.

=== 2007 ===
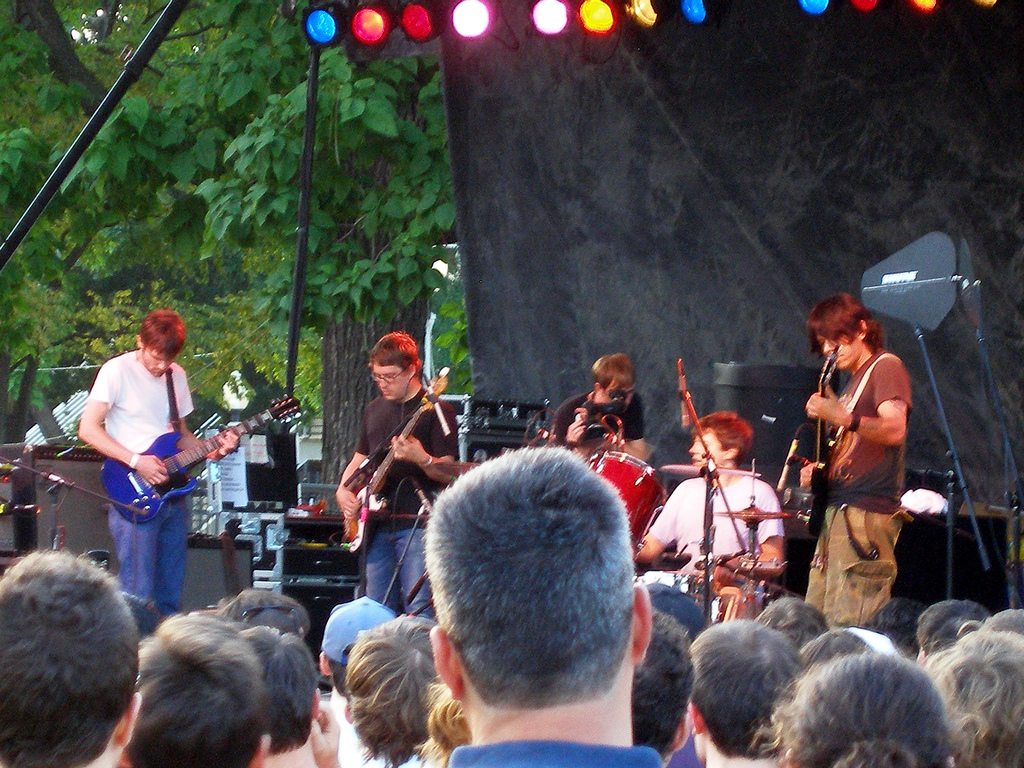
Slint at Pitchfork Music Festival

The 2007 Pitchfork Music Festival was held on July 13–15, 2007, again in Union Park. The festival was sold out with 48,000 visitors.

=== 2006 ===
The 2006 Pitchfork Music Festival was the first festival organized and run entirely by Pitchfork Media. This was also the only year that the Pitchfork and Intonation Music Festivals were held in the same year. The 2006 Pitchfork festival drew more than 35,000 visitors to listen to 41 bands on July 29 and 30.

=== 2005 Intonation Music Festival ===
In 2005, Pitchfork Media was hired by a music promotion company called Skyline Chicago to curate the Intonation Festival at Union Park in Chicago. While this was not technically the "Pitchfork Music Festival," because of Pitchfork Media's prominent role in the event as well as its future success in staging similar festivals at the same location, many Chicagoans and music fans consider the 2005 event to be for all intents and purposes the first Pitchfork festival and refer to it by that name.

The performers included Tortoise, the Wrens, the Decemberists, the Go! Team, Les Savy Fav, Broken Social Scene, Andrew Bird, and the Hold Steady.

== Paris ==
=== 2025 ===
The 2025 Paris festival was held on 3 to 9 November 2025.

Monday, 3 November

- Blood Orange, Self Esteem, DellaXOX, Roland Faunte, Saya Gray, Lumï, Hetta Falzon, Sassy 009

Tuesday, 4 November

- Erika de Casier, Léa Sen, Momma, Du Blonde, Panda Bear, Panchiko, Hannah Jadagu, Sydney Minsky Sargeant, Haley Heynderickx, Etta Marcus, Kellan Christopher Cragg

Wednesday, 5 November

- A. G. Cook, Underscores, Indigo De Souza, Jay Som, Swank Mami, Teethe, Destiino, CHLOE, Sutja Gutiérrez, Sapphist Eye

Thursday, 6 November

- Annie-Dog, Babymorocco, Deep Sea Diver, Hank Heaven, holybones, Indian Wells, Iyamah, Mechatok, Renny Conti, Slate, strongboi, Alex Amen, Full Body 2, Rabbitfoot, Saint Clair, shortstraw., Spill Tab, Sean Trelford

Friday, 7 November

- Boko Youtm Body Meat, Daffo, Great Grandpa, hey, nothing, Isaiah Hull, Jensen McRae, Punching Bag, quinnie, runo plum, Sophia Stel, The New Eves, TTSSFU, Jane Remover, late night drive home, Westside Cowboy, Will Paquin

Saturday, 8 November

- Annahstasia, fakemink, LUCY (Cooper B. Handy), Malcolm Todd, Real Farmer, RIP Magic, Stella Bridie, Witch Post, Wombo, 454, Gia Ford, Makeshift Art Bar, Pollyfromthedirt, Sean Solomon, Somewhere Special, Nabeel (نبيل), Tommy Barlow, Yaeger

Sunday, 9 November

- Marie Davidson, Hamilton Leithauser, Silver Gore, Quiet Man, Kelora

=== 2024 ===
The 2024 Paris festival was held on 4 to 10 November 2024.

Monday, 4 November

- Judeline, Okay Kaya, Anastasia Coope, Bikôkô

Tuesday, 5 November

- Charlotte Day Wilson, Liana Flores, Konradsen

Wednesday, 6 November

- Sega Bodega, Good Morning, Holly Macve, Font, Florence Sinclair, Kiss Facility

Thursday, 7 November

- Divorce, Eaves Wilder, Len, Mabe Fratti, MRCY, Tiberius b, Abby Sage, Angélica Garcia, Bolis Pupul, Christian Lee Hutson, Deep Tan, Disgusting Sisters, Friko, Jacob Alon, Lucky Lo, Sekou, Thandii, Winter

Friday, 8 November

- bby, Chanel Beads, Infinity Song, Love Remain, Rocket, Sarah Julia, Bug Eyed, Ebbb, Fcukers, Hex Girlfriend, Jasmine.4.T, LA LOM, Loren Kramar, Malice K, MAY, Pom Pom Squad, YHWH Nailgun, Ahadadream, Anaco, Tatyana Jane, Charlotte Plank

Saturday, 9 November

- Elsy Wameyo, June McDoom, Snow Strippers, Sword II, Ugly, BLACK FONDU, Borough Council, Chloe Slater, Cloth, Floodlights, GRLwood, HiTech, Humane The Moon, Humble the Great, Lava La Rue, RIMON, The Itch, Treanne, Belaria, Soyoon, Soft Crash, Chloe Qisha, Georgie & Joe

Sunday, 10 November

- Rusowsky, COBRAH

=== 2023 ===
The 2023 Paris festival was held on 6 to 12 November 2023.

Monday, 6 November

- Dream Wife, Pillow Queens, Been Stellar, Youth Lagoon

Tuesday, 7 November

- Namasenda, blackwinterwells, Hyd

Wednesday, 8 November

- Weyes Blood, Ichiko Aoba, Crumb, Helado Negro, pablopablo, Mav, Bawo, Paris

Thursday, 9 November

- Special Interest, Sam Akpro, Picture Parlour, Bellah

Friday, 10 November

- Anjimile, Fat Dog, eee gee, Kneecap, Eli Smart, MAFRO, Ray Laurél, Gurriers, Richy Mitch & The Coal Miners, Kara Jackson, Water from Your Eyes, Tkay Maidza, Medium Build, Memphis LK, Skinny Pelembe, Sofia Kourtesis, The Dare, Jonah Yano, Hagop Tchaparian

Saturday, 11 November

- bar italia, Bingo Furry, Girl and Girl, Jawny, KhakiKid, Kid Apollo, Lana Lubany, Lip Critic, mercury, Militarie Gun, Poison Anna, Sophie May, UNIVERSITY, Venbee, Hemlocke Springs, Dumb Buoys Fishing Club, Nourished by Time, Lutalo, Deki Alem, Ethel

Sunday, 12 November

- Leith Ross, Haley Blais, Saya Gray

=== 2022 ===
The 2022 Paris festival was held on 14 to 21 November 2022. The festival was held over fourteen venues around Paris, including Badaboum, Carbone Club, La Boule Noire, La Place, Les Disquaires, Quartier de Bastille, Supersonic Records, Le Café de la Danse, Church of Saint-Eustache, La Gaîté Lyrique, Le Consulat, POPUP! and Supersonic.

Monday, 14 November

- Le Café de la Danse: Jordana, MICHELLE, TV Girl
- La Gaîté Lyrique: O., DEADLETTER, Black Country, New Road

Tuesday, 15 November

- La Gaîté Lyrique: TV Priest, Nation of Language, Porridge Radio

Wednesday, 16 November

- La Gaîté Lyrique: NNAMDÏ, Falle Nioke, The Comet Is Coming
- La Place: Nemzzz, thaHomey, 8ruki

Thursday, 17 November

- La Place: Sadandsolo, Yaya Bey, Knucks
- Le Consulat: SUPER!, Sierra mgmt, Le Grenier

Friday, 18 November

- Le Café de la Danse: Dréya Mac, Sam Wise, Sudan Archives
- POPUP!: Luna Li, piri & tommy, They Hate Change
- Supersonic: Regressive Left, L'objectif, The Goa Express
- Supersonic Records: Prima Queen, Ethan P. Flynn
- Badaboum: John Glacier, Yeule, Nia Archives
- Les Disquaires: Sister Ray, Sarah Kinsley, Charlie Hickey

Saturday, 19 November

- Le Café de la Danse: Astrønne, Léa Sen, Dua Saleh
- POPUP!: Nukuluk, Grove, Yunè Pinku
- Supersonic: CMAT, Romero, VLURE
- Supersonic Records: Johanna Warren, Mandy Indiana
- Badaboum: Sans Soucis, Jeshi, Pip Millett
- Les Disquaires: flowerovlove, Grace Ives, Gretel Hänlyn
- Le Consulat: HSRS, Damlif

Sunday, 20 November

- La Boule Noire: Okay Kaya
- Le Consulat: JÜDE, Astrønne, NKA

Monday, 21 November

- Church of St. Eustache: Arooj Aftab

=== 2021 ===
The 2021 Paris festival was held on 15 to 21 November 2021. The festival was held in ten venues across Paris, including Salle Pleyel, Bataclan, La Gaîté Lyrique, and Church of St. Eustache.

Monday, 15 November

Church of Saint Eustache: Bobby Gillespie & Jehnny Beth

Tuesday, 16 November

La Gaîté Lyrique: Shygirl, Alewya, Denise Chaila

Wednesday, 17 November

La Gaîté Lyrique: Charlotte Adigéry & Bolis Pupul, Amaarae, Hope Tala

Thursday, 18 November

Bataclan: Sons of Kemet, Nubya Garcia, cktrl

Friday, 19 November

Le Café de la Danse: Cassandra Jenkins, Lael Neale, Gabriels
POPUP!: Kai Kwasi, Sloppy Jane, Erika de Casier
Badaboum: KeiyaA, Claud, Godford
Badaboum After Party: Denis Sulta, Sofia Kourtesis, TSHA
Les Disquaires: Miso Extra, Elliott Armen
Supersonic Records: Kynsy, NewDad, TV Priest
Supersonic: Talk Show, Molly Payton, Wet Leg

Saturday, 20 November

Le Café de la Danse: Elliott Armen, Faux Real, En Attendant Ana
POPUP!: ML Buch, Kamal., Berwyn
Badaboum: Kam-BU, L'Rain, ENNY
Badaboum After Party: India Jordan, Josey Rebelle, Marina Trench
Les Disquaires: Kathleen Frances, Fabiana Palladino
Supersonic Records: H. Hawkline, Yard Act
Supersonic: Lime Garden, Choses Sauvages, Katy J Pearson

Sunday, 21 November

Salle Pleyel: Sébastien Tellier, Muddy Monk

=== 2019 ===
The 2019 Paris festival was held on October 31, November 1–2. The headliners are Skepta, The 1975, Chromatics, Belle and Sebastian, Mura Masa, Hamza and Charli XCX.

Grande Halle

Thursday: Ezra Collective, Mura Masa, Hamza, Skepta

Friday: Desire, Primal Scream, Chromatics, Belle and Sebastian

Saturday: Jamila Woods, Charli XCX, The 1975, SebastiAn

Nef

Thursday: Kojaque, slowthai, Flohio, Ateyaba, Zola

Friday: Barrie, Nilüfer Yanya, Weyes Blood, John Talabot

Saturday: Caroline Polachek, Aurora, Agar Agar, 2ManyDj's (DJ set)

Petite Halle

Thursday: sean, Master Peace, Retro X, Yussef Dayes

Friday: Loving, Sons of Raphael, Squid, Sheer Mag, CHAI

Saturday: Mk.gee, Aeris Roves, KadhyaK, Kedr Livanskiy

Studio

Thursday: duendita, Charlotte Dos Santos, Rachel Chinouriri, Kojey Radical, The Comet Is Coming

Friday: Briston Maroney, Nelson Beer, Jackie Mendoza, Orville Peck, Helado Negro

Saturday: Korantemaa, Jessica Pratt, BEA1991, oklou, Ela Minus

=== 2018 ===
The 2018 Paris festival was held on November 1–3. The headliners were Bon Iver, Kaytranada and Mac DeMarco. Pitchfork also hosted Avant-Garde, a block party held on October 30 and 31.

Thursday: New Optimism (Miho Hatori), Cola Boyy, Rolling Blackouts Coastal Fever, Yellow Days, John Maus, Étienne Daho, the Voidz, Mac DeMarco

Friday: Boy Pablo, Tirzah, Dream Wife, Lewis OfMan, Car Seat Headrest, Chromeo, Bagarre, Chvrches, Blood Orange, Kaytranada

Saturday: Michael Rault, Muddy Monk, Snail Mail, Stephen Malkmus and the Jicks, Unknown Mortal Orchestra, Bon Iver, Jeremy Underground, DJ Koze, Peggy Gou, Avalon Emerson, Daniel Avery

Avant-Garde

Cafe de la Danse

Tuesday: Lauren Auder, IDER, Let's Eat Grandma

Wednesday: Naaz, Kelsey Lu, Cautious Clay

Badaboum

Tuesday: Kiran Kai, Rimon, JPEGMafia, Jimothy Lacoste

Wednesday: Etta Bond, Biig Piig, Kojey Radical, Slowthai

Reservoir

Tuesday: Weakened Friends, Holiday Sidewinder, Alaskalaska

Wednesday: Black Midi, Mint Field, Sasami

La Chapelle des Lombards

Tuesday: Sam Evian, Jack Grace, Stella Donnelly

Wednesday: Helena Deland, Gold Star, Honey Harper

Pan Pier

Tuesday: Wicca Phase Springs Eternal, Mellah, Westerman, Apollo Noir

Wednesday: Palm, Anemone, O-Olivier Marguerit, Trevor Powers

Supersonic

Tuesday: Hop Along, Starchild and the new Romantics, Crumb

Wednesday: Madison McFerrin, Hatchie, Yuno

PopUp!

Tuesday: Khadyak, Grand Pax, Jockstrap

Wednesday: Suzi Wu, Buzzy Lee, Anaïs

=== 2017 ===
The 2017 Paris festival was held on November 2–4. The headliners were The National, Jungle and Run the Jewels. Pitchfork also hosted Avant-Garde, a block party held on October 31 and November 1.

Thursday: Ethan Lipton & His Orchestra, Moses Sumney, This Is the Kit, Chassol, Rone, Ride, Kevin Morby, The National

Friday: HMLTD, Cigarettes After Sex, Tommy Genesis, Sylvan Esso, Andy Shauf, Isaac Delusion, Rejjie Snow, Kamasi Washington, Polo & Pan, Jungle

Saturday: Sigrid, Songe, Tom Misch, Loyle Carner, Jacques, BadBadNotGood, Princess Nokia, Run the Jewels, The Blaze, Bicep, The Black Madonna, Talaboman

Avant-Garde

Mécanique Ondulatoire

Tuesday: NOLIFE, Sorry, Bryan's Magic Treats

Wednesday: Bad Nerves, The Pale White, Priests

Café de la Danse

Tuesday: Isaac Gracie, (Sandy) Alex G, Big Thief

Wednesday: Rostam, Nick Hakim, Noga Erez

Badaboum

Tuesday: Mavi Phoenix, Obongjayar, A2, Benny Mails

Wednesday: Sälen, Oklou, Jamila Woods, Hundred Waters

La Loge

Tuesday: Korey Dane, Leif Vollebekk, Julie Byrne

Wednesday: Matt Maltese, Angelo De Augustine, Wovoka Gentle

Pop Up Du Label

Tuesday: K Á R Y Y N, Lido Pimienta, Tennyson

Wednesday: Soleil Vert, Pauli, Oko Ebombo

Pan Piper

Tuesday: Ary, SuperParka, Malca, You Man

Wednesday: Ama Lou, Triplego, Hare Squead, Ray BLK

Supersonic

Tuesday: Puma Blue, Yellow Days, Pinegrove

Wednesday: Silly Boy Blue, Yowl, Vagabon

=== 2016 ===
The 2016 Paris festival was held on October 27–29. The headliners were Nick Murphy FKA Chet Faker, Moderat and M.I.A.

Thursday: Aldous RH, Lucy Dacus, Parquet Courts, Suuns, Floating Points, DJ Shadow, Mount Kimbie, Nick Murphy FKA Chet Faker

Friday: C Duncan, Porches, Brandt Brauer Frick, Flavien Berger, Explosions in the Sky, Bat for Lashes, Todd Terje & the Olsens, Moderat

Saturday: Joey Purp, Bonzai, Whitney, Shame, Minor Victories, Warpaint, Abra, M.I.A., Acid Arab, Motor City Drum Ensemble, Daphni, Tale of Us

Avant-Garde

Café de la Danse

Tuesday: Krrum, Loyle Carner, Frances

Wednesday: Robbing Millions, Adia Victoria, Thom Sonny Green

Badaboum

Tuesday: Nilüfer Yanya, Mabel, Fickle Friends

Wednesday: Skott, Jordan Rakei, Requin Chagrin

Mécanique Ondulatoire

Tuesday: Get Inuit, Hoops, Anteros

Wednesday: Lucy Dacus, Communions, Cherry Glazerr

Supersonic

Tuesday: Klangstof, Smerz, Alex Cameron

Wednesday: Fhin, Dark0, Kenton Slash Demon

Pop-Up du Label

Tuesday: Alfie Connor, Connie Constance, Cleopold

Wednesday: Pi Ja Ma, Beaty Heart, Isaac Gracie

La Loge

Tuesday: Faroe, Cameron A G, Okay Kaya

Wednesday: Alyss, Anna of the North, Kaitlyn Aurelia Smith

Café de la Presse

Tuesday: Manast LL', Kweku Collins, Jones

Wednesday: Salute, Tirzah, Tommy Genesis

Pitchfork & RBMA After Parties

Thursday: Malibu, River Tiber, Jessy Lanza, Clams Casino, Ryan Hemsworth

Friday: Lamusa, Dollkraut DJ, Jacques, Pangaea, Bambounou

=== 2015 ===
The 2015 Paris festival was held on October 29–31. The headliners were Thom Yorke - Tomorrow's Modern Boxes, Beach House and Ratatat.

Thursday: Hælos, Kirin J. Callinan, Destroyer, Ariel Pink, Godspeed You! Black Emperor, Deerhunter, Beach House

Friday: Dornik, Rome Fortune, Health, Rhye, Kurt Vile & The Violators, Battles, Thom Yorke - Tomorrow's Modern Boxes, Four Tet

Saturday: Hinds, Curtis Harding, Nao, Father John Misty, Unknown Mortal Orchestra, Run the Jewels, Spiritualized, Ratatat, Hudson Mohawke, John Talabot b2b Roman Flügel, Laurent Garnier

Opening Night (Tuesday)

Café de la Danse: Børns, Empress Of, LA Priest

Badaboum: SG Lewis, Moses Sumney, Mura Masa, DJ Allie Teilz

Mécanique Ondulatoire: Mild High Club, Bully, Speedy Ortiz

RBMA presents Pitchfork After Party #1 at Trabendo

Thursday: Rustie, Nosaj Thing, two, Gilligan Moss, Jade Statues, John Pope, Keight

Friday: Omar S, Galcher Lustwerk, Andre Bratten, Cosmo, k2k

=== 2014 ===
The 2014 Paris festival was held on October 30–31 and November 1. The headliners were Belle & Sebastian, Caribou and James Blake.

Thursday: Ought, How to Dress Well, The Notwist, The War on Drugs, Mogwai, Jon Hopkins, James Blake

Friday: Perfect Pussy, D.D Dumbo, Son Lux, Future Islands, MØ, Chvrches, St. Vincent, Belle & Sebastian

Saturday: Jessy Lanza, Charlotte OC, Tobias Jesso Jr., Kwamie Liv, Movement, Foxygen, tUnE-yArDs, José González, Jungle, Caribou, Four Tet, Jamie xx, Kaytranada

Opening Party

Wednesday: Kindness, Kelela, All We Are, Shura

After Party

Thursday: Joy Orbison, Martyn, Ryan Elliott, Felix

Friday: Lunice, Fatima Al Qadiri, Sophie, Tourist, Douchka

=== 2013 ===
The 2013 Paris festival was held on October 31 and November 1–2. The headliners were The Knife, Hot Chip and Disclosure.

Thursday: Only Real, Iceage, Blood Orange, No Age, Mac DeMarco, Savages, Mount Kimbie, Darkside, The Haxan Cloak, The Knife

Friday: Petit Fantôme, Deafheaven, Jagwar Ma, Warpaint, Colin Stetson, Junip, Ariel Pink, Connan Mockasin, Danny Brown, Disclosure

Saturday: Empress Of, Pegase, Majical Cloudz, Sky Ferreira, Youth Lagoon, Baths, Omar Souleyman, Yo La Tengo, Panda Bear, Hot Chip, Glass Candy, Todd Terje, A-Trak

Opening Night

Wednesday: Julianna Barwick, The Dodos, Jackson Scott, Forest Swords

After Party

Thursday: John Talabot, Pional, Genius of Time, Evans

Friday: Jon Hopkins, Jacques Greene, Evian Christ, Kuage, Sundae

=== 2012 ===
The 2012 Paris festival was held on November 1–3. The headliners were M83, Animal Collective and Grizzly Bear.

Thursday: How to Dress Well, AlunaGeorge, DIIV, Factory Floor, Japandroids, Chairlift, John Talabot, Sébastien Tellier, James Blake, M83

Friday: Outfit, Ratking, Jessie Ware, Wild Nothing, The Tallest Man on Earth, The Walkmen, Chromatics, Robyn, Fuck Buttons, Animal Collective

Saturday: Isaac Delusion, Cloud Nothings, Purity Ring, Twin Shadow, Liars, Death Grips, Breton, Grizzly Bear, Disclosure, Totally Enormous Extinct Dinosaurs, Rustie, Simian Mobile Disco, Julio Bashmore

=== 2011 ===
The 2011 Paris festival was held on October 28–29. The headliners were Bon Iver and Aphex Twin.

Friday: Team Ghost, Fucked Up, Real Estate, Washed Out, Wild Beasts, Mondkopf, Aphex Twin, Pantha du Prince, Cut Copy, Four Tet, Erol Alkan

Saturday: Rosebuds, Kathleen Edwards, Stornoway, Jens Lekman, Lykke Li, Bon Iver

== London ==
=== 2026 ===
The 2026 London edition will take place from 2 to 8 November.

2 November

MOTH
- Horse Jumper of Love
- Jawdropped
- Hammok

3 November

MOTH	KOKO
Greg Mendez; Asher White; Villagerrr	The Radio Dept; Ana Roxanne; A Good Year

4 November

Hackney Empire	Hackney Church	MOTH	KOKO	Village Underground	Earth Hall
Jacob Alon; Paulie Swan	Tortoise; Bill Orcutt; Dagmar Zuniga	Rockie Rode; The Healing Power of Horses; Any Young Mechanic	Aja Monet; Keiyaa; Momoko Gill	Mgna Crrrta; Daine; Touching Ice	Los Thuthanaka; Joshua Chuquimia Crampton

5 November

Cause	Village Underground	Earth Theatre	ICA	MOTH
Ear; Charlie Osborne; Ship Sket	Lido Pimienta; Amore; Ms Ray	Actress; Kmru; Joy Guidry	Robert Lester Folsom; Star Moles; Sean Solomon	Colin Miller; Told Slant; H. Pruz; Elijah Wolf

6 November

Troxy	MOTH	Roundhouse	ICA
Bassvictim; RealYungPhil; Lex Amarni	Kiwi Jr.; Alien Boy; Bleary Eyed	The Avalanches; Panda Bear & Sonic Boom; Arushi Jain	Olof Dreijer; Fauzia; Cutouts

7 November

Dalston Takeover	Village Underground	Roundhouse	ICA
60 Juno; Bloodsports; Cootie Catcher; DIIV; Flawed Mangoes; Flooding; Hiding Places; Ideasforconversations; Jordan Patterson; Lots of Hands; Mandy, Indiana; Maria BC; Midwife; MX Lonely; Psychedelic Porn Crumpets; Robber Robber; Sarah Meth; Sell Everything; Sex Mask; Sundots; Superfan; Swapmeet; Turnspit; Victoryland; Working Men's Club	Thaiboy Digital	Noname; Georgia Anne Muldrow; Cleo Reed; Kaicrewsade	Nirosta Steel

8 November

Royal Festival Hall
- Hania Rani

=== 2025 ===
The 2025 London edition took place 4 to 8 November.

Tuesday, 4 November

Royal Albert Hall	93 Feet East
King Gizzard & the Lizard Wizard with the Covent Garden Simfonia	The World Is a Beautiful Place & I Am No Longer Afraid to Die; Truck Violence; Clutter

Wednesday, 5 November

Corsica Studios	EartH Theatre	Village Underground	Union Chapel	HERE at Outernet	93 Feet East
Unwound; Divide and Dissolve; deathcrash	Kali Malone (solo electronic); Rachika Nayar & Nina Keith present Disiniblud; Kathryn Mohr	Upchuck; Ratboys; Party Dozen	Ali Sethi & Nicolas Jaar; James K	Two Shell; Mechatok; Silver Gore; Isaiah Hull	Hannah Jadagu; Yves Jarvis; Bells Larsen

Thursday, 6 November

Colour Factory	Barbican	Fabric	Village Underground	ICA	93 Feet East
Sideshow; Anysia Kym; Niontay; duendita; Jadasea; Jespfur; redLee	Destroyer; The Fiery Furnaces	Marie Davidson; Kaitlyn Aurelia Smith; RIP Magic	Saul Williams meets Carlos Niño and friends; Elliott Skinner; Pan Amsterdam	Los Thuthanaka; Nazar; Pollyfromthedirt	Du Blonde; Makeshift Art Bar; No Windows

Friday, 7 November

93 Feet East	Colour Factory	Royal Festival Hall	Roundhouse	Roundhouse Studio
Céline Dessberg; Jennifer Walton; Parade	Nick León; Laurel Halo; Mi-el	Nala Sinephro	Oklou; Erika de Casier; Malibu	Nick León; Loukeman; Holybones

Saturday, 8 November

EartH Theatre	EartH Hall	Dalston Victoria	Cafe Oto	The Shacklewall Arms	St Matthias Church	Roundhouse	Roundhouse Studio
Indigo De Souza; Jay Som; hey, nothing; Teethe; Mamalarky	Panchiko; Underscores; Momma; Full Body 2	Great Grandpa; Winter; Slate; Just for Fun	Body Meat; Boko Yout; Another Country $$$$	Deep Sea Diver; Runo Plum; Renny Conti; Golomb	Will Paquin; Alex Amen; Vegas Water Taxi	Laurie Anderson; Lonnie Holley; Maria Somerville	Beatrice Dillon; Lauren Duffus; Elaine Howley

=== 2024 ===
The 2024 London edition took place from 5 to 10 November.

Tuesday, 5 November

KOKO	The Lexington
Kae Tempest; Sam Morton; Jacob Alon	Tucker Zimmerman; Ellie O'Neill; Iji

Wednesday, 6 November

Barbican	The Garage	Fabric	EartH Theatre
Jessica Pratt; Alan Sparhawk (of Low)	Charly Bliss; Aziya; Meagre Martin	Billy Woods; Moor Mother; Elucid; Goya Gumbani	Mabe Fratti; Still House Plants; Cole Pulice

Thursday, 7 November

Roundhouse Main Room	Roundhouse Studio	Fabric	The Lexington	Village Underground	Islington Assembly Hall
Arooj Aftab; Zsela; Keeley Forsyth	Rachael Lavelle; Sheherazaad; Vanessa Bedoret	Empress Of; Fcukers; Tatyana; Dora	Elias Ronnenfelt; Loverman; Fine	Snow Strippers; Suzy Sheer; Eera	Drugdealer; Good Morning; June McDoom

Friday, 8 November

HERE at Outernet	ICA	The Lower Third	EartH Hall
Sega Bodega; Alice Glass; Doss; Rose Gray	Laraaji; Treanne; Laryssa Kim	Far Caspian; Cardinals; Annie Dog	Cobrah; Big Wett; Girl Ultra

Saturday, 9 November

Dalston Victoria	EartH Hall	EartH Theatre	St Matthias	Shacklewell Arms	Vortex Jazz	Troxy
Whitelands; Wishy; Urika's Bedroom; Slow Fiction	Shame; Geordie Greep; Pom Pom Squad; Horse Jumper of Love; Font	Marika Hackman; Claire Rousay; Chanel Beads; Abby Sage; LA LOM	Hannah Frances; Anastasia Coope; Bloomsday	Friko; Rocket; Voyeur; Good Looks	YHWH Nailgun; Untitled (Halo); Eterna	Casisdead; Qendresa (DJ); Florence Sinclair; System Olympia

Sunday, 10 November

Roundhouse Main House	Roundhouse Studio	Oslo
Tierra Whack; Miso Extra; 1515	Jawnino; Elsy Wameyo	The Reds, Pinks and Purples; Rosali; Armlock

=== 2023 ===
The 2023 edition was announced 24 April with dates set for 7–13 November. The initial selection of the lineup announced included Weyes Blood, Yaeji, Sleater-Kinney, Helado Negro, the live debut of Jonny Greenwood and Dudu Tassa's new duo collaboration, U.S. Girls, Mavi, Crumb, Jessy Lanza, Porridge Radio, Sorry, Ryoji Ikeda, Alabaster DePlume, Wednesday, Youth Lagoon, Water from Your Eyes, Just Mustard, Barrie, Fly Anakin, Deeper, Porches, Gurriers, Pearl and the Oysters, Been Stellar, Lutalo, Eee Gee, Fazerdaze, and McKinley Dixon.

Tuesday, 7 November 2023

Royal Albert Hall
- Ezra Collective
- Selassie TBC

Wednesday, 8 November 2023

Colour Factory	The Barbican	Village Underground
Slauson Malone 1; Nourished by Time; Astrid Sonne	Ryoji Ikeda presents ultratronics; Rachika Nayar	Balming Tiger; Golin; Billionhappy & Chalky Wong

Thursday, 9 November 2023

Hackney Church	Earth Hall
Crumb; Helado Negro; Ian Sweet	MAVI; MIKE; Fly Anakin; McKinley Dixon

Friday, 10 November 2023

Village Underground	Roundhouse	Roundhouse Studio
CHAI; Dawn Richard; ill peach	Sleater-Kinney; U.S. Girls; Black Belt Eagle Scout	SNÕÕPER; M(h)aol; RVG
KOKO		St Matthias Church
Alabaster DePlume; with special appearances from: Donna Thompson; Momoko Gill; Skylla; Nuha Ruby Ra; Seb Rochford		Joanna Sternberg; Leith Ross; Haley Blais

Saturday, 11 November 2023

Roundhouse	Roundhouse Studio	The Underworld
Yaeji; Jessy Lanza; George Riley	yunè pinku; Debby Friday; Blackwinterwells	Fucked Up; OFF!; JOHN
Kings Place – Hall 1	Kings Place – Hall 2	EartH Hall (Dalston Takeover)
Kara Jackson; Joanne Robertson; Annahstasia	Joanna Sternberg	Porridge Radio; Wednesday; Water from Your Eyes; Squirrel Flower; Aime Simone
EartH Theatre (Dalston Takeover)	Cafe Oto (Dalston Takeover)	The Victoria (Dalston Takeover)
Sorry (with strings); Just Mustard; eee gee; Anjimile	Kelly Moran; UCHE YARA; Godcaster	Been Stellar; Dust; Gurriers
Shacklewell Arms (Dalston Takeover)
Deeper; Fazerdaze; Pearl & the Oysters; Hotline TNT

Sunday, 12 November 2023

EartH Theatre
- Youth Lagoon
- Barrie
- Lutalo

Monday, 13 November 2023

Eventim Apollo
- Weyes Blood
- Ichiko Aoba
- Vagabon

=== 2022 ===
The 2022 London festival was held on 9 to 12 November.

Wednesday, 9 November

- Fabric: Desire, Club Intl, Glüme
- Village Underground: Lil Silva, Ivy Sole, Jeshi, Feux
- EartH Theatre: Coby Sey, Moin, bar italia
- ICA: Black Country, New Road, O.

Thursday, 10 November

- Fabric: George Clanton, Neggy Gemmy, Death's Dynamic Shroud
- Oval Space: Injury Reserve, Billy Woods, They Hate Change, Nukuluk
- Islington Assembly Hall: Faye Webster, MICHELLE, Jordana
- Paper Dress Vintage: M FIELD, Elanor Moss, Clara Mann
- Oslo: Julien Chang, EKKSTACY, Hannah Jadagu

Friday, 11 November

- EartH Theatre: William Basinski, Jenny Hval, Lyra Pramuk, Lucinda Chua
- EartH Hall: Special Interest, Guerilla Toss, NNAMDï, Marina Herlop
- St Matthias Church: Indigo Sparke, KAINA, Charlie Hickey, Johanna Warren
- Shacklewell Arms: Romero, Sister Ray, Wild Pink, Lala Lala

Saturday, 12 November

- EartH Hall: Danny L Harle's Harlecore (Gammer, Cryalot, Torus, Cloudo)
- 60 Dock Road – Room 1: I. JORDAN B2B LCY
- 60 Dock Road – Room 2: CHIYU, Melati, DJ Tusap, Lumi, Ar, wardrobefanatic
- Colour Factory: Okay Kaya, Yaya Bey, Goya Gumbani

Sunday, 13 November

- Roundhouse: Courtney Barnett, Cate Le Bon, DEHD, Samia, Big Joanie, Léa Sen, Fake Fruit, Gretel Hänlyn
- The Albany: Kae Tempest

=== 2021 ===
Pitchfork Music Festival London made its debut in 2021 on 10–14 November. The festival was held in twelve venues across London.

Wednesday

Village Underground: Mykki Blanco, Charlotte Adigéry & Bolis Pupul, TYSON

Fabric: Anna Meredith, PVA, Grove

Earth Theatre: Bobby Gillespie & Jehnny Beth, Art School Girlfriend

Thursday

Earth Theatre: Bobby Gillespie & Jehnny Beth, Cassandra Jenkins, Natalie Bergman

Fire: PC Music "Love Goes On" (Hannah Diamond, Namasenda, Caro<3, Felicita, Easyfun, Umru, KKB Soundsystem, Mowalola)

Fabric: Giant Swan, Eartheater, DJ Winggold

Friday

Southbank Centre: Black Midi, Moor Mother

Oslo: Denise Chaila, Lex Amor, Carla Prata

Moth Club: Iceage, deathcrash, The Umlauts

Oval Space: Remi Wolf, Gabriels, Joviale

Saturday

Oval Space / Canvas / Pickle Factory: Tirzah, Koreless, Good Sad Happy Bad, Lucinda Chua, Nabihah Iqbal, Kareem Ali, L'Rain, Harvey Causon, Haich Ber Na, Tiberius B

Hackney Church: Moses Boyd, Nilüfer Yanya, Emma-Jean Thackray, cktrl

Sunday

The Roundhouse: Stereolab, Girl Band, Beak>, Ana Roxanne, Folly Group, Martha Skye Murphy, Kynsy

== Berlin ==
=== 2022 ===
The inaugural edition of Pitchfork Music Festival Berlin was held on 4 to 6 November 2022.

Friday, 4 November

- Columbia Theater: Nation of Language, Fake Fruit, Luna Li
- silent green / Betonhalle: I. JORDAN, Lyzza, HAWA
- Zenner: Desire, Club Intl., Mothermary

Saturday, 5 November

- Festsaal Kreuzberg: Squid, Dehd, Okay Kaya
- silent green / Betonhalle: Black Midi, Crack Cloud, Guerilla Toss

Sunday, 6 November

- Metropol: The Comet Is Coming, Ivy Sole, Loshh
- Zenner: Blawan Live A/V featuring Bernhard Holaschke, aya
- silent green / Kuppelhalle: yeule, Oli XL

=== 2020 ===
The inaugural edition of Pitchfork Music Festival Berlin was to be held on 8–9 May 2020, but was cancelled. The headliners were going to be Lianne La Havas and Modeselektor.

Friday: Lianne La Havas, Soap&Skin, Brandt Brauer Frick, Nadine Shah, Nick Hakim, Celeste, Ilgen-Nur, Oum Shatt, duendita, Okay Kaya

Saturday: Modeselektor (Live), HVOB (Live), Tim Hecker, John Talabot (DJ), Kelly Lee Owens, DJ Spinn B2B RP Boo, rRoxymore (Live), Peaking Lights, BLVTH, Lary

== Mexico City ==
=== 2025 ===
The 2025 Mexico City festival took place from May 1 to 4. The festival was held at three venues: Estadio Fray Nano, Foro Indie Rocks!, and Casa del Lago UNAM.

Thursday, May 1, 2025

Foro Indie Rock!
- NAAFI Presents: DJ Fucci, Imaabs B2B Zutzut
- Luz, Luz, Luz!
- Untitled (Halo)

Friday, May 2, 2025

Estadio Fray Nano
- Black Country, New Road
- Silvana Estrada
- Rodrigo Amarante
- Tim Bernardes
- Bedouine
- A Veces Siempre
- Rosas

Saturday, May 3, 2025

Foro Indie Rock!
- Beth Gibbons
- Earl Sweatshirt
- Oneohtrix Point Never
- Ross from Friends
- Roc Marciano & The Alchemist
- Machine Girl
- Rejjie Snow

Sunday, May 4, 2025

Casa del Lago UNAM
- James K
- Edgar Mondragón & IMGN

=== 2024 ===
The first edition of Pitchfork Music Festival held in Mexico City was announced on October 16, 2023, with dates set for March 6 to 10, 2024.

Wednesday, 6 March 2024

Frontón Bucareli
- JPEGMafia
- Billy Woods
- Armand Hammer
- Los Alan Anaya

Thursday, 7 March 2024

Foro Indie Rocks!	Frontón Bucareli	Yu Yu
Godspeed You! Black Emperor; Vyctoria	Debby Friday; RUBIO	Pelada (DJ set); AAAA; Maseriche

Friday, 8 March 2024

Frontón Bucareli	Foro Indie Rocks! Sala A	Foro Indie Rocks! Sala B
Sky Ferreira; Yeule; NOIA; Noa Sainz	Andy Shauf; Mabe Fratti	Marie Davidson (DJ Set); Pelada (live); Mazmorra Brillante Promiseland; Delilah Holliday

Saturday, 9 March 2024

Frontón Bucareli	Fünk23
King Krule; Protomartyr; Descartes a Kant; Diles que no me maten; Corridor; Mengers; Glasser	DJ Holographic; Mnty B2B Ly; Meilgaarden; Celice

Sunday, 10 March 2024

Casa del Lago (Espacio Sonoro)
- Amy Dang
- Mabe Fratti
