= Pitchfork Music Festival Paris 2021 =

Music festival

- Dates: 16–22 November 2021
- Location(s): Paris, France
- Website: pitchforkmusicfestival.fr

The Pitchfork Music Festival Paris 2021 was held on 16 to 22 November 2021. It was held in various venues across Paris, France. On 19 to 20 November, the festival was held in more intimate music venues across the Bastille district, billed as "Pitchfork Avant-Garde". Amidst the COVID-19 pandemic in France, only 75 percent capacity of the venues was permitted for indoor events. The festival garnered more than 7,500 attendees.

== Venues ==
- Badaboum
- Bataclan
- Café de la Danse
- Les Disquaires
- Fondation Louis Vuitton
- La Gaîté Lyrique
- POPUP!
- Salle Pleyel
- Supersonic Club
- Supersonic Records

== Lineup ==
Bartees Strange, Bobby Gillespie & Jehnny Beth, Claud, Erika de Casier, Kareem Ali, Soccer96, TV Priest and Unschooling were announced to perform at the festival but cancelled their appearances. Enny, Fabiana Palladino, H. Hawkline, Kamal., Kathleen Frances, Katy J Pearson, Lime Garden, Metronomy, Miso Extra, Muddy Monk, Sébastien Tellier, Sloppy Jane, Talk Show, and Wet Leg were added to the line-up.

La Gaîté Lyrique
Tuesday, 16 November	Wednesday, 17 November
Shygirl; Alewya; Denise Chaila	Charlotte Adigéry & Bolis Pupul; Amaarae; Hope Tala

Bataclan
Thursday, 18 November
- Sons of Kemet
- Nubya Garcia
- cktrl

Salle Pleyel
Sunday, 21 November
- Sébastien Tellier
- Muddy Monk

Fondation Louis Vuitton
Monday, 22 November
- Metronomy

=== Pitchfork Avant Garde ===
Le Café de la Danse
Friday, 19 November	Saturday, 20 November
Gabriels; Lael Neale; Cassandra Jenkins	En Attendant Ana; Faux Real; Elliott Armen

POPUP!
Friday, 19 November	Saturday, 20 November
Joviale; Sloppy Jane; Kai Kwasi	Berwyn; Kamal.; ML Buch

Badaboum
Friday, 19 November	Saturday, 20 November
Godford; KeiyaA; Simili Gum	Enny; L'Rain; Kam-BU

Les Disquaires
Friday, 19 November	Saturday, 20 November
Elliott Armen; Miso Extra	Fabiana Palladino; Kathleen Frances

Supersonic Records
Friday, 19 November	Saturday, 20 November
NewDad; Kynsy	Yard Act; H. Hawkline

Supersonic
Friday, 19 November	Saturday, 20 November
Wet Leg; Molly Payton; Talk Show	Katy J Pearson; Choses Sauvages; Lime Garden
