= Triple Seven (album) =

Studio album by Wishy
- Released: August 16, 2024
- Studios: Russian Recording (Bloomington, Indiana, US)
- Length: 40:03
- Label: Winspear
- Producers: Kevin Krauter; Ben Lumsdaine

Wishy chronology
Paradise (EP) (2023)	Triple Seven (2024)	Planet Popstar (EP) (2025)

Singles from Triple Seven
- 1. "Love on the Outside" Released: May 14, 2024; 2. "Triple Seven" Released: June 13, 2024; 3. "Sick Sweet" Released: July 8, 2024; 4. "Just Like Sunday" Released: July 31, 2024

Triple Seven is the debut studio album by American indie rock band Wishy. It was released on August 16, 2024, via Winspear. The album was written by Wishy co-founders Kevin Krauter and Nina Pitchkites, along with Steve Marino of the band Angel Dust. It was recorded in Bloomington, Indiana, and produced by Krauter and Ben Lumsdaine.

== Background ==
The album, which follows the band's 2023 EPs Mana and Paradise, was announced on May 13, 2024. The majority of the album was recorded in Bloomington, Indiana, at Russian Recording. The album title is a reference to a slot machine jackpot and was also selected for being an angel number.

The title track was originally written by vocalist Nina Pitchkites and Steve Marino in 2022. After recording the track in producer Ben Lumsdaine's home studio in Los Angeles, the band recorded over 20 more tracks. While some were included in Paradise, the majority of them were compiled into Triple Seven.

== Release ==
The lead single of the album, "Love on the Outside", was released on May 14, 2024. The title track, "Triple Seven", was released as the second single of the album on June 13, 2024, alongside a music video directed by Haoyan of America. The third single, "Sick Sweet", was released on July 8, 2024, with an accompanying music video directed by Nate Kahn. The final promotional single, "Just Like Sunday", was released on July 31, 2024.

The album was released on August 16, 2024, via the record label Winspear.

== Critical reception ==
Professional ratings
Aggregate scores
Source	Rating
Metacritic	80/100
Review scores
Source	Rating
AllMusic	4.0/5 stars
MusicOMH	4/5 stars
NME	4/5 stars
Paste	8.3/10
Pitchfork	7.3/10

Triple Seven was met with generally positive reviews. At Metacritic, which assigns a normalized rating out of 100 to reviews from mainstream publications, the album received an average score of 80, based on eight reviews. Writing for Paste, Ben Salmon praised the band's sound, specifically their instrumentals, and described the album as "one of the most irresistible, unshakeable albums of the year".

== Track listing ==
Triple Seven track listing
No.	Title	Writer(s)	Length
1.	"Sick Sweet"	Kevin Krauter	3:16
2.	"Triple Seven"	Nina Pitchkites; Steve Marino	3:26
3.	"Persuasion"	Krauter	2:48
4.	"Game"	Krauter	3:25
5.	"Love On The Outside"	Krauter	3:58
6.	"Little While"	Pitchkites	4:38
7.	"Busted"	Krauter	5:47
8.	"Just Like Sunday"	Pitchkites; Marino	3:22
9.	"Honey"	Krauter	4:27
10.	"Spit"	Krauter	4:56
Total length:			40:03
