= The Greater Wings =

Studio album by Julie Byrne
- Released: July 7, 2023
- Recorded: 2018, 2021, 2022
- Studios: Chicago, Buffalo, Los Angeles
- Genres: American folk music, contemporary folk
- Length: 38:27
- Language: English
- Label: Ghostly International
- Producers: Jake Falby; Eric Littmann; Alex Somers

Julie Byrne chronology
Not Even Happiness (2017)	The Greater Wings (2023)	Julie Byrne with Laugh Cry Laugh (2023)

Singles from The Greater Wings
- 1. "Summer Glass" Released: April 24, 2023; 2. "The Greater Wings" Released: May 17, 2023; 3. "Moonless" Released: June 6, 2023

He was a truly brilliant person, he had so much faith in me and what we had set out to do together—that never wavered... It wasn't even his vision or technical skill or artistry that made the collaboration so rich and singular, it was his love and care.

— Byrne on collaborator Eric Littmann, who died suddenly during the recording process.

The Greater Wings is the third studio album by American folk singer-songwriter Julie Byrne, released on July 7, 2023, on Ghostly International. The album focuses on grief, including the death of musical collaborator and romantic partner Eric Littmann and has received acclaim from critics.

== Recording and release ==
Byrne began composing this album in 2018, shortly after the release of Not Even Happiness and started recording in late 2020. She initially recorded it in a number of sessions across the United States, between Byrne touring and moving. Producer for these sessions Eric Littman died suddenly in mid-2021, interrupting the recordings and leading to Byrne writing songs to process her grief. When Ghostly International paired her with Alex Somers, she was able to complete the recording process. She also expanded her instrumental palette by building on her earlier guitar-based compositions with synthesizer, harp and string accompaniment.

This album was promoted with three singles and was supported by a tour of the United Kingdom and United States.

== Reception ==
Editors at AnyDecentMusic? rated this album an 8.3 out of 10, based on 15 reviews. According to the review aggregator Metacritic, The Greater Wings received "universal acclaim" based on a weighted average score of 91 out of 100 from 13 critic scores.

Editors at AllMusic rated this album 4.5 out of 5 stars, with critic Marcy Donelson writing that "while grief and heartache are constant undertones here, they are often outshone by emotions like gratitude and anticipation". Andrew Sacher of BrooklynVegan stated that while "death is a topic that people have written songs about for centuries", this work "is inextricably linked to grief on a level that even many of the most devastating death songs are not" and that "it feels like a triumph and an act of resilience that it even exists at all, let alone sounds this powerful". A brief review in The Fader states that Byrne "offers a bold and masterful take on the singer-songwriter canon". Writing for The Line of Best Fit, Janne Oinonen rated this release a 9 out of 10, calling it, "an intimate yet expansive masterpiece rooted in loss and grief", also opining that "Byrne's writing allows for different interpretations". In Paste, Eric R. Danton gave this release an 8.1 out of 10, noting that the album has various moods and that Byrne makes "specific feeling[s] universal" and these moods become "the artfully woven tapestry of her music"; the publication chose it as one of the 10 best albums of July 2023. Editors at Pitchfork named this Best New Music of the week, with critic Marc Hogan scoring it an 8.5 out of 10 for "glimpsing the sublime" in moments of vulnerability. Alex Brent of PopMatters rated this release a 9 out of 10, calling it "otherwordly" and Byrne's "best work yet" and sums up that it is "sublime and difficult to fault". The publishers of Stereogum also chose this as Album of the Week, with critic Ryan Leas writing that the music has "an intimate sense of grandeur" with "songs that are soul-crushingly beautiful" on "a gentle, often hushed album".

At The Arts Desk, Kieron Tyler rated this release 4 out of 5 stars, writing that the album initially seems "weightless" but the lyrics show that Byrne is "a folk-inclined singer-songwriter of rare intensity". Matthew Neale of Clash Music gave The Greater Wings a 9 out of 10, calling it "a stunning experience" exploring grief and legacy. In The Guardian, Ben Beaumont-Thomas gave this album 5 out of 5 stars, calling it "a stunning study of love and loss" and concludes that "Byrne's album is ultimately as singular as the woman singing it, and as unforgettable as a departed friend". Ed Power of Hot Press rated this release an 8 out of 10, writing that the songs have "a haunting quality" and praises "the architecture of the record" for being "both brittle and effervescent". Mojo's Andrew Male rated The Greater Wings 4 out of 5 stars, calling it a "love letter and elegy and encompasses the deeply held emotions of both". Another four-star review came from Steven Johnson of musicOMH, who calls this "by far her strongest release to date". Jonathan Wright of The Quietus stated that Byrne shows "a keen understanding of musical dynamics and a willingness to take risks" among many folktronica acts. Writing for The Skinny, Jamie Pettinger gave this album 4 out of 5 stars for being "a sonically patient, cinematic and hopeful record" that "essentially grabs you and pulls you down into Byrne's slowly breathing world of all-encompassing grief". In Uncut, The Greater Wings received 4.5 out of 5 stars from Sharon O'Connell who praised Byrne's musical palette: "alongside finger-picked guitar and voice are a harp, strings, piano and analogue synths, which bear the songs aloft, despite their weighty emotions".

The Greater Wings in best-of lists
Outlet	Listing	Rank
AllMusic	AllMusic Best of 2023	—N/a
AllMusic	Favorite Singer-Songwriter Albums of 2023	—N/a
BrooklynVegan	BrooklynVegan's Top 55 Albums of 2023	—N/a
BrooklynVegan	10 Great Folk Albums from 2023	—N/a
Exclaim!	Albums of the Year 2023	10
Exclaim!	Exclaim!'s 50 Best Albums of 2023	27
The Fader	The 50 Best Albums of 2023	19
Gorilla vs. Bear	Gorilla vs. Bear's Albums of 2023	28
The Houston Chronicle	Andrew Dansby's 10 best alternative albums of 2023	—N/a
Irish Independent	The best international albums of 2023	17
Mojo	Mojo's Top 75 Albums of 2023	10
musicOMH	musicOMH's Top 50 Albums Of 2023	24
El País	The best music albums of 2023	17
Paste	The 50 Best Albums of 2023	6
Pitchfork	The 50 Best Albums of 2023	21
Pitchfork	The 37 Best Rock Albums of 2023	—N/a
Stereogum	The 50 Best Albums of 2023	44
Uncut	Uncut's Top 75 Albums of 2023	9
Under the Radar	Under the Radar's Top 100 Albums of 2023	70

In 2024, The Greater Wings was nominated for Best Folk Record at the Libera Awards.

== Track listing ==
All songs written by Julie Byrne, except where noted.

1. "The Greater Wings" (guitar composed by Trayer Tryon) – 3:25
2. "Portrait of a Clear Day" – 3:21
3. "Moonless" – 3:46
4. "Summer Glass" (strings composed by Jake Falby) – 4:20
5. "Summer's End" – 2:56
6. "Lightning Comes Up from the Ground" (guitar composed by Tryon) – 4:00
7. "Flare" (lyrical contributions by Em Fontana) – 3:48
8. "Conversation Is a Flowstate" – 3:38
9. "Hope's Return" (instrumentation co-written by Jefre Cantu-Ledesma, Jake Falby, and Alex Somers) – 4:05
10. "Death Is the Diamond" (piano composed by Eric Littmann, strings composed by Jake Falby) – 5:09

== Personnel ==
"The Greater Wings"

- Julie Byrne – guitar, vocals
- Jake Falby – strings
- Nadia Hulett – backing vocals
- Eric Littmann – Korg Minilogue synthesizer
- Trayer Tryon – guitar

"Portrait of a Clear Day"

- Julie Byrne – guitar, vocals
- Marilu Donovan – harp
- Jake Falby – strings
- Alex Somers – backing vocals

"Moonless"

- Julie Byrne – piano, vocals
- Marilu Donovan – harp
- Jake Falby – strings
- Eric Littmann – piano

"Summer Glass"

- Julie Byrne – vocals
- Marilu Donovan – harp
- Jake Falby – strings, Aelita synthesizer
- Eric Littmann – piano, Prophet Rev 4 synthesizer
- Alex Somers – strings, Paraphonic synthesizer

"Summer's End"

- Julie Byrne – guitar, vocals
- Marilu Donovan – harp
- Eric Littmann – Minilogue synthesizer

"Lightning Comes Up from the Ground"

- Julie Byrne – guitar, vocals
- Eli Crews – standup bass
- Jake Falby – strings

"Flare"

- Julie Byrne – guitar, vocals
- Marilu Donovan – harp
- Jake Falby – strings
- Jefre Cantu Ledesma – Modular synthesizer
- Eric Littmann – Minilogue synthesizer
- Alex Somers – arrangement

"Conversation Is a Flowstate"

- Julie Byrne – vocals
- Eric Littmann – Minilogue synthesizer
- Alex Somers – arrangement

"Hope's Return"

- Julie Byrne – vocals
- Jake Falby – bowed guitar
- Nadia Hulett – backing vocals
- Jefre Cantu Ledesma – Modular synthesizer
- Alex Somers – bowed guitar

"Death Is the Diamond"

- Julie Byrne – piano, vocals
- Jake Falby – piano, opening strings

Technical personnel

- Eli Crews – additional engineering
- Taylor Deupree – mastering at 12K Mastering
- Jake Falby – production
- Ikhoor Studio – design
- Rafael Anton Irisarri – additional recording
- Eric Littmann – production
- Alex Somers – mixing, production
- Tonje Thilesen – photography

== Charts ==
The Greater Wings was Julie Byrne's first domestic chart appearance, debuting at 90 on Billboard's Top Current Album Sales with 1,000 downloads sold in its first week.

Chart performance for The Greater Wings
Chart	Peak
Scottish Albums (Official Charts)	14
UK Album Sales (OCC)	10
UK Album Downloads (Official Charts)	36
UK Independent Albums (Official Charts)	6
UK Physical Albums (OCC)	10
US Top Current Album Sales (Billboard)	90

== See also ==
- 2023 in American music
- List of 2023 albums
