= Julie Byrne with Laugh Cry Laugh =

EP by Julie Byrne
- Released: November 17, 2023
- Length: 11:19
- Language: English
- Label: Ghostly International

Julie Byrne chronology
The Greater Wings (2023)	Julie Byrne with Laugh Cry Laugh (2023)

Julie Byrne with Laugh Cry Laugh is a 2023 extended play from American singer-songwriter Julie Byrne. The album has received positive reviews from critics.

== Reception ==
Andrew Sacher of BrooklynVegan included this among the notable releases of the week and wrote that "each song shows off a different side of Julie’s gorgeously somber sound", continuing that the album includes several genres, such as minimalist ambient pop, folk, sophisti-pop, and electro-acoustic. Writing for Spill Magazine, Ljubinko Zivkovic rated this album 9 out of 10, considering it "outstanding" and a great companion to" Byrne's full-length The Greater Wings, released several months earlier, as both have "excellent songwriting, a beautiful voice, and a penchant for arrangements to match". Marc Abbott of Under the Radar rated this album 8 out of 10 stars, calling it "quite possibly the perfect early Christmas present" for being "as sublime as it is subliminal".

Paste ranked this the 24th best EP of the year and critic Madelyn Dawson called it "a perfect end-cap to what The Greater Wings accomplished earlier this year", which "solidifies that this was, without a doubt, Julie Byrne’s year".

== Track listing ==
1. "’22" (Julie Byrne) – 1:58
2. "These Days" (Jackson Browne) – 3:33
3. "Velocity! What About the Inertia!?" (Emily Fontana, lyrical contributions by Byrne) – 2:49
4. "Entropy Increasing" – 2:59

== Personnel ==
Julie Byrne with Laugh Cry Laugh

- Julie Byrne – vocals on "'22", "These Days", and "Velocity! What About the Inertia?"; guitar on "These Days"
- Emily Fontana – bass guitar on "Velocity! What About the Inertia!?"
- Taryn Blake Miller – synthesizer on "'22" and "Velocity! What About the Inertia!?"; guitar on "Velocity! What About the Inertia!?"; drums on "Velocity! What About the Inertia!?"; vocal harmony on "'22"; recording on "'22", "These Days", and "Velocity! What About the Inertia!?"; engineering on "'22", "These Days", and "Velocity! What About the Inertia!?"; mixing on "Entropy Increasing"

Additional personnel

- Hara Kiri – additional mixing on "Entropy Increasing"

== See also ==
- 2023 in American music
- List of 2023 albums
