= Johanna Warren =

American singer-songwriter and actor

- Born: St. Petersburg, Florida, United States
- Occupations: Musician, singer-songwriter, actor, writer
- Instruments: Vocals, guitar, piano, flute
- Labels: Carpark Records, Wax Nine Records, Spirit House, Team Love
- Website: johannawarren.com

Johanna Warren is an American musician and actor, now based in Wales.

== Early life ==
Warren was born in St. Petersburg, Florida. She played flute in her school band as a child (she plays flute on many of her recordings), and started teaching herself guitar at age thirteen.

== Career ==
Warren wrote and released her earliest songs in high school on MySpace under the moniker Sticklips, which turned into a psych folk band with friends she met in college. The group released two albums before disbanding in 2012 after the death of their guitar player. Warren spent the following year on the road as a backup singer with Iron & Wine. She self-released her first solo record, Fates, in 2013.

Her sophomore LP, numun, released in 2015 on Team Love Records, made its way on to several year-end lists, including Stereogum's Best New Bands of 2015. Rolling Stone Magazine called her a "Singer-Songwriter You Need to Know."

In 2016 Warren founded Spirit House Records, on which she released her third solo album Gemini I and its conceptual "twin" Gemini II, which received praise from The New York Times, Pitchfork and NPR.

In 2020 Warren's fifth studio album Chaotic Good was released on Carpark Records/Wax Nine Records. It received praise from Pitchfork, NPR, and Paste Magazine. Her sixth solo LP, “Lessons for Mutants,” arrived to critical acclaim in 2022, also on Carpark/ Wax Nine.

Warren has toured extensively since 2012. She has toured with Mitski, Julie Byrne, Marissa Nadler, and Xasthur. She was an official performer at SXSW in 2017 and 2018, and at Pitchfork London and Pitchfork Paris in 2022.

In 2023 Warren announced she was “mostly retiring” from touring. To commemorate the occasion she recorded The Rockfield Sessions, a retrospective selection of 28 songs spanning her entire catalog recorded at Rockfield Studios in rural Wales, near where Warren currently lives.

As an actor, Warren played a leading role in the indie feature She the Creator, the debut film from writer/director Juliette Wallace. She voiced the character Bob on the Netflix series The Midnight Gospel. The music video for her single "Twisted", which Warren starred in and co-directed with Richey Beckett, won Best Music Video at the Portland Film Festival.

In October 2021 Warren announced her new musical adaptation of Euripides' The Bacchae, co-written with fellow interdisciplinary artist J Landon Marcus. A first look at the production was premiered online via Harvard's Center for Hellenic Studies.

Also an herbalist and Reiki Master, Warren is an outspoken advocate for regenerative farming, rewilding and the healing powers of nature. In 2018 Warren traveled solo around the US on a "Plant Medicine Tour," partnering with local herbalists and organic farmers in over 65 cities to raise awareness about the healing powers of plants.

== Discography ==
=== Solo albums ===
- It is Like a Horse. It is Not like Two Foxes (2009) – as Sticklips
- Zemi (2012) – as Sticklips
- Fates (2013)
- numun (2015)
- Gemini I (2016)
- Gemini II (2018)
- Chaotic Good (2020)
- Lessons for Mutants (2022)
- The Rockfield Sessions Vol. 1 (2023)
- The Rockfield Sessions Vol. 2 (2024)

=== Guest appearances ===
- Natalie Merchant album by Natalie Merchant (2014) – Backing vocals on multiple songs
- Not Even Happiness album by Julie Byrne (2017) – Backing vocals on multiple songs
- Zoolights album by Forest Veil (2016) – Backing vocals and flute on multiple songs

== Filmography ==
=== FILM ===
Year	Title	Role	Notes
2019	She the Creator	Kat	Post production

=== TV ===
Year	Title	Role	Notes
2019	The Midnight Gospel	Bob (singing)	Episode 5
