= Nukuluk =

English hip-hop band

- Origin: South London, England
- Genres: Experimental hip-hop; electronica
- Years active: 2020–present
- Labels: Colorbust Records
- Members: Monika; Syd; Mateo Villanueva Brandt; Louis Grace
- Past members: Olivia Morgan

Nukuluk is an English experimental hip-hop band formed in 2020 in South London. Their music has been categorised as experimental hip-hop and electronica. They are most notable in participating at the 2022 Pitchfork Music Festival in London.

== History ==
Nukuluk formed in South London during the early stages of the COVID-19 pandemic in 2020 when founding members Syd and Monika connected through mutual friends in Forest Hill. Syd encouraged Monika to experiment with rapping, and drummer Louis Grace later joined the group after being invited from another project. This early trio formed the collective, later joined by bassist and visual artist Mateo Villanueva Brandt and synth player and producer Olivia Morgan. Morgan later departed the group.

The collective's debut EP, Disaster Pop, was released in 2021. It showcased the band's initial sound, characterised by abrupt shifts between delicate, ambient textures and aggressive hip-hop passages. The EP was described as a "labour of love" with a polished production despite the group's spontaneous approach. The music video for the title track, created by Leo DMB, utilized stop-motion and live-action techniques to mirror the band's layered aesthetic.

Following Disaster Pop, Nukuluk embarked on a year of live performances throughout 2022 and 2023. These experiences significantly influenced their musical development, leading them to embrace a more instrumentally rich sound. Their live shows evolved into theatrical performances, shifting between "super intimate and vulnerable" moments and "super high energy". This dynamic approach shaped the direction of their second EP, Superglue, released in April 2023. The project was their "most experimental yet", and expanded their sonic palette by incorporating more live instrumentation alongside their electronic foundation. The EP's title alluded to a sense of fragmentation and cohesion—of things "exploded and being held together", according to the band.

While their debut EP featured no recorded acoustic drums or guitars, their subsequent work incorporated these elements more fully. Their debut mixtape, Stillworld, followed in 2024 via Colorburst Records. The release was described as a reflection of "life in the city" and explored complex emotional themes such as paranoia, love, nostalgia, and loss. The mixtape included both new material and reworked tracks from earlier in the band's career.

== Artistry ==
Nukuluk's musical style has been described as experimental hip-hop and electronica. Nukuluk's music defies conventional genre classifications, combining glitchy electronic production with elements of punk rock, R&B, heavy metal, and ambient music. The band describes their music as experimental hip-hop, trip hop, alternative rock, ambient, nu metal, and indie electronica. Their work features robotic, contorted soundscapes layered with field recordings, acoustic instrumentation, and resampled materials that obscure their origins. The band emphasises the fusion of analogue and digital approaches, and all members participate equally in the production process, fostering a non-hierarchical and collaborative dynamic. In an interview, members of Nukuluk cited a diverse range of musical influences, naming Ryuichi Sakamoto and Tricky as foundational inspirations, alongside contemporary artists such as JPEGMafia, Danny Brown, Wu-Lu, 100 gecs, Sophie, Death Grips, and Duster.

Vocal performances are central to their sound, particularly the interplay between Monika and Syd. Monika has described his own delivery as "confrontational" and emotionally charged, while Syd offers a more melancholic and introspective presence. Their lyrics address themes of emotional intensity, alienation, and personal relationships. Stillworld in particular contains reflections on fatherhood and grief, inspired by the death of Syd's father and Monika's evolving views on family and identity. The group's live performances are theatrical and emotionally varied, moving between intimate vulnerability and high-energy outbursts. A performance at Reading and Leeds Festivals in 2022, which the group described as "awkward", motivated them to refine their live approach. Their subsequent set opening for Injury Reserve at Pitchfork Music Festival London was seen as a turning point, informing the creation of tracks like "Son of Star".

== Members ==
Current members

- Monika – vocals
- Syd – vocals, guitar, production, sampling, video
- Mateo Villanueva Brandt – bass, visual art
- Louis Grace – drums, drum production

Former members

- Olivia Morgan – synthesiser, sampling, vocals, production

== Discography ==
Extended plays

- Disaster Pop (2021)
- Superglue (2023)

Mixtapes

- Stillworld (2024)
