= Not Even Happiness =

Studio album by Julie Byrne
- Released: January 13, 2017
- Genre: Contemporary folk
- Length: 32:37
- Labels: Ba Da Bing; Basin Rock

Julie Byrne chronology
Rooms with Walls and Windows (2014)	Not Even Happiness (2017)	The Greater Wings (2023)

Singles from Not Even Happiness
- 1. "Natural Blue" Released: November 15, 2016; 2. "Follow My Voice" Released: December 14, 2016; 3. "I Live Now as a Singer" Released: January 4, 2017

Not Even Happiness is the second studio album by American singer-songwriter Julie Byrne. It was released on 13 January 2017 by Basin Rock in the United Kingdom and on 27 January 2017 by Ba Da Bing Records in the United States.

== Background and composition ==
The album was recorded and mixed in Byrne's hometown, Buffalo, New York, except for the string arrangements by Jake Falby, which were recorded at a cabin in Holderness, New Hampshire.

The album is labeled as a contemporary folk release. According to Ed Nash of The Line of Best Fit, Not Even Happiness features leitmotifs of "nature and matters of the heart".

== Critical reception ==
Professional ratings
Aggregate scores
Source	Rating
AnyDecentMusic?	7.7/10
Metacritic	82/100
Review scores
Source	Rating
AllMusic	3.5/5 stars
Financial Times	4/5 stars
The Guardian	4/5 stars
Mojo	4/5 stars
NME	4/5 stars
The Observer	4/5 stars
Pitchfork	8.3/10
Q	3/5 stars
Record Collector	4/5 stars
Uncut	8/10

Not Even Happiness received universal acclaim from music critics. On Metacritic, the album holds an average critic score of 82, based on 22 critics, indicating "universal acclaim". Ed Nash of The Line of Best Fit gave the album a positive review, dubbing it "Album of the Week".

=== Accolades ===
Publication	Accolade	Rank	Ref.
AXS TV	The Best Albums of 2017	N/A	
Consequence of Sound	Top 50 Albums of 2017	37	
Exclaim!	Top 10 Folk and Country Albums of 2017	10	
Gorilla vs. Bear	Albums of 2017	25	
MOJO	Mojo's Top 50 Albums of 2017	28	
Paste	The 50 Best Albums of 2017	27	
Piccadilly Records	End of Year Review 2017: Top 100 Albums	93	
Pitchfork	The 50 Best Albums of 2017	37	
Spin	50 Best Albums of 2017	9	
Stereogum	The 50 Best Albums of 2017	20	
Tiny Mix Tapes	2017: Favorite 50 Music Releases	43	
Uncut	Albums of the Year	14	
Uproxx	50 Best Albums of the Year	45	

== Track listing ==
All tracks are written by Julie Byrne, except where noted.

No.	Title	Writer(s)	Length
1.	"Follow My Voice"		4:02
2.	"Sleepwalker"		4:19
3.	"Melting Grid"	Julie Byrne; Michele Finkelstein	4:21
4.	"Natural Blue"		3:59
5.	"Interlude"	Eric Littmann	1:37
6.	"Morning Dove"		2:59
7.	"All the Land Glimmered Beneath"		3:04
8.	"Sea as It Glides"		4:12
9.	"I Live Now as a Singer"		4:04
Total length:			32:37

== Personnel ==
Credits adapted from Not Even Happiness album liner notes.

- Julie Byrne – writing, performing
- Michele Finkelstein – flute on "Melting Grid"
- Chris Masullo – guitar on "Sea as It Glides"
- Jake Falby – string arrangements
- Johanna Warren – backing vocals
- Eric Littmann – production, recording, mixing, synthesizer
- Alan Douches – mastering
- Jonathan Bouknight – photography
