= Wishy =

American indie rock band

- Origin: Indianapolis, Indiana, U.S.
- Genres: Indie rock; shoegaze
- Years active: 2021–present
- Label: Winspear
- Members: Kevin Krauter; Nina Pitchkites; Conner Host; Mitch Collins; Dimitri Morris
- Past members: Stephen Orban

Wishy is an American indie rock band from Indianapolis, Indiana. The band consists of Kevin Krauter (vocals, guitar), formerly of the band Hoops, Nina Pitchkites (vocals, guitar), Dimitri Morris (guitar), Mitch Collins (bass) and Conner Host (drums).

After releasing two EPs – Mana and Paradise – in 2023, the band released its debut studio album, Triple Seven, in 2024 to widespread critical acclaim. The band released a third EP, Planet Popstar, in April 2025, followed by their second studio album, Nature's Pill, in October 2026.

== History ==
Krauter and Pitchkites formed the band in 2021. The band released their debut EP in 2023 titled Mana. The band released their second EP of 2023 titled Paradise. On August 16, 2024, Wishy released their debut album Triple Seven, through Winspear. They also announced a tour for late 2024.

June 9, 2026, Wishy released the single "Lovesick" and announced their second album, Nature's Pill, which was released October 2, 2026.

== Discography ==
=== Studio albums ===
Title	Details
Triple Seven	Released: August 16, 2024; Label: Winspear; Formats: Cassette, CD, LP, digital download, streaming
Nature's Pill	Released: October 2, 2026; Label: Winspear; Formats: Cassette, CD, LP, digital download, streaming

=== EPs ===
- Mana (2023)
- Paradise (2023)
- Planet Popstar (2025)

== Band members ==
=== Current members ===
- Kevin Krauter – vocals, guitar (2021–present)
- Nina Pitchkites – vocals, guitar (2021–present)
- Dimitri Morris – guitar (2023–present), bass (2021–2023)
- Mitch Collins – bass (2023–present)
- Conner Host – drums (2021–present)

=== Former members ===
- Stephen Orban - guitar (2021–2023)
