= Aperture (Hannah Jadagu album) =

Studio album by Hannah Jadagu
- Released: 19 May 2023
- Studio: Greasy Records, Paris
- Length: 38:19
- Label: Sub Pop
- Producer: Max Robert Baby, Hannah Jadagu

Hannah Jadagu chronology
What Is Going On? (2021)	Aperture (2023)	Describe (2025)

Singles from Aperture
- 1. "Say It Now" Released: 22 September 2022; 2. "What You Did" Released: 22 February 2023; 3. "Warning Sign" Released: 22 March 2023; 4. "Admit It" Released: 19 April 2023; 5. "Lose" Released: 16 May 2023

Aperture is the debut studio album by American musician Hannah Jadagu. It was recorded at Greasy Records studio in Paris and released on record label Sub Pop in May 2023.

== Background and release ==
Jadagu's first releases were a series of tracks that she recorded at home and released on SoundCloud while still in high school. In 2021, Sub Pop released Jadagu's debut EP What Is Going On?, which she recorded on her iPhone and mixed using GarageBand.

Aperture was recorded in Paris at the Greasy Records studio, with producer Max Robert Baby. The tracks were written while Jadagu attended New York University. The first single from Aperture was "Say It Now", which was released in September 2022. It was followed by four other singles: "What You Did" in February 2023, "Warning Sign" in March, "Admit It" in April, and "Lose" in May, three days before the album release.

== Critical reception ==
Professional ratings
Aggregate scores
Source	Rating
Metacritic	80/100
Review scores
Source	Rating
AllMusic	4/5 stars
Clash	8/10
DIY	4/5 stars
The Line of Best Fit	8/10
NME	4/5 stars
The Skinny	4/5 stars
Uncut	7/10

Metacritic summarised the critical response to Aperture as "generally favorable." The Line of Best Fit wrote that "where Jadagu may lack full control over soundcraft or songwriting, she proves instinct alone to be a righteous alternative to experience." In a review for Clash, Amrit Virdi wrote that the "toned-down moments are where the best songs live as Hannah's vocals take centre stage." Anita Bhadani of The Skinny highlighted single "Warning Sign" as the best track.

== Track listing ==
No.	Title	Length
1.	"Explanation"	2:01
2.	"Say It Now"	3:40
3.	"Six Months"	3:04
4.	"What You Did"	3:02
5.	"Lose"	3:16
6.	"Admit It"	3:38
7.	"Dreaming"	2:55
8.	"Shut Down"	2:46
9.	"Warning Sign"	3:26
10.	"Scratch the Surface"	3:21
11.	"Letter to Myself"	4:11
12.	"Your Thoughts Are Ur Biggest Obstacle"	2:59
Total length:		38:19

== Personnel ==
- Production – Max Robert Baby, Hannah Jadagu
- Mixing – Marcus Linon
- Mastering – Dave Cooley
