= Will Paquin =

American singer-songwriter and guitarist

- Occupations: Singer-songwriter, guitarist
- Years active: 2020–present

Will Paquin is an American singer-songwriter and guitarist. He drew attention in 2020 when his single "Chandelier" spread widely on TikTok, leading to independent releases noted for intricate guitar work. His debut album, Hahaha, was released in September 2025 and received coverage from regional and online music press.

== Background and career ==
Paquin began uploading guitar riffs and original songs while a student at Boston University. After campus closures in 2020 due to the COVID-19 pandemic, he focused on home recordings and shared clips on TikTok, where "Chandelier" drew a large audience. Over the next several years he released singles and EPs independently and toured small venues in North America.

In June 2025, Paquin announced his first full-length album, Hahaha, described as a self-released, guitar-forward set with psych and garage-rock elements and preceded by the single "I Work So Hard". The album was released on September 12, 2025. Reviewers noted the album's stylistic range including bursts of indie rock and punk alongside jazz-tinged passages. He was announced for European dates including Pitchfork Music Festival London and Live at Leeds: In the City in November 2025.

== Musical style and influences ==
Critics have described Paquin's music as indie and garage-rock with psych elements, built around fingerstyle guitar; Hahaha was characterized as mixing indie rock and punk energy with occasional jazz inflections, and comparisons in reviews referenced acts including Vampire Weekend, the Cramps and Pixies.

== Tours and live performances ==
Paquin has played small-venue headline shows and was billed for city-based festival programs in the U.K., including Pitchfork Music Festival London and Live at Leeds: In the City in November 2025.
