= Hannah Jadagu =

American pop musician (born 2002)

- Born: June 19, 2002 (age 24); Texas, U.S.
- Origin: Mesquite, Texas, U.S.
- Years active: 2020–present
- Label: Sub Pop
- Website: hannahjadagu.com

Hannah Jadagu is an American bedroom pop musician.

== Early life ==
Jadagu was raised in Mesquite, Texas, United States. Her parents were Zimbabwean immigrants.

== Career ==
In 2020, Jadagu moved to New York City to study music business at New York University. In April 2021, she debuted with her EP, What Is Going On?, with label Sub Pop. The EP was made entirely on her iPhone 7 using GarageBand. It was featured on NPR Music.

After delays due to the COVID-19 pandemic, Jadagu co-headlined with Wild Nothing and Beach Fossils on her first tour in October 2021. During this time, she released the single "All My Time Is Wasted." The song was used in the American superhero drama Naomi.

Jadagu released another single, "Say It Now," in September 2022, which drew attention from publications such as Clash and DIY. The song was praised for its combination of "drifting pop-edged indie melodies" and "warm, easy vocal" with direct lyrics that ask "difficult questions."

Jadagu played in Pitchfork Music Festival London 2022.

In 2023, Jadagu announced her debut album, Aperture, alongside the single "What You Did." Aperture was written between her tours with Faye Webster, Wet, and Frankie Cosmos, and is themed around "about the transitional experience of coming into [Jadagu's] early 20s." The title is inspired by aperture priority in photography; as explained by Jadagu, "as a young person today, you have to know how to choose what to carry with you from your experiences and what to leave behind, what to close the light on."

New York Times described "What You Did" as showcasing "Jadagu's easy aptitude with lilting melodies and her love of deliciously crunchy texture."

== Activism ==
In December 2022, it was announced that Jadagu would be participating in abortion access benefit concerts by Ground Control Touring, along with other artists such as Horsegirl and Ian Sweet, in January 2023.

== Discography ==
=== Albums ===
Title	Album details
Aperture	Released: May 19, 2023; Label: Sub Pop; Format: LP, CD, cassette, streaming, digital download
Describe	Released: October 24, 2025; Label: Sub Pop; Format: LP, CD, streaming, digital download

=== Extended plays ===
Title
What Is Going On?
Extended play details
- Released: April 23, 2021
- Label: Sub Pop
- Format: Cassette, streaming, digital download
Notes

Track listing
No.	Title	Length
1.	"My Bones"	2:19
2.	"Sundown"	3:36
3.	"Think Too Much"	2:51
4.	"What Is Going On?"	3:28
5.	"Bleep Bloop"	3:45
Total length:		15:59

=== Singles ===
Title	Year	Album
"Think Too Much"	2021	What Is Going On?
"All My Time Is Wasted"	2021	Non-album single
"Say It Now"	2022	Aperture
"What You Did"	2023	Aperture
"Warning Sign"	2023	Aperture
"Admit It"	2023	Aperture
"Lose"	2023	Aperture
"My Love"	2025	Describe
"Doing Now"	2025	Describe
"Gimme Time"	2025	Describe
"Normal Today"	2025	Describe
"Describe"	2025	Describe
"More"	2026	Describe
"D.I.A.A"	2026	Describe
"Tell Me That !!!!"	2026	Describe
