= Rooms with Walls and Windows =

Compilation album by Julie Byrne
- Released: January 21, 2014
- Studio: Chicago, Illinois, United States
- Genre: Folk, singer-songwriter
- Length: 41:50
- Language: English
- Label: Orindal

Julie Byrne chronology
Julie Byrne (2013)	Rooms with Walls and Windows (2014)	Not Even Happiness (2017)

Rooms with Walls and Windows is the first full-length album by American singer-songwriter Julie Byrne, released in 2014. The album is a compilation of two limited-run cassette tapes that Byrne released in 2012, You Would Love It Here and Julie Byrne.

== Reception ==
Russel Warfield of Drowned in Sound gave this album a 7 out of 10, writing that Byrne "brilliantly subverts this old truism" of succeeding through directness that makes "an immersive listen with absolutely no breaks from its fragile atmosphere; a beautiful and beguiling record, full of space, absence, and mixed emotions". In Loud and Quiet, Chris Watkeys rated this release a 5 out of 10, writing that while Byrne "has created something beautiful... something with a shred of originality she has not". Pitchfork Media's Jayson Greene scored Rooms with Walls and Windows a 7.4 out of 10, recommending that listeners use headphones to appreciate the softer sounds in the songs, which resembles ambient music.

== Track listing ==
All songs written by Julie Byrne.

1. "Wisdom Teeth Song" – 4:40
2. "Young Wife" – 2:15
3. "Attached to Us Like Butcher Wrap" – 4:35
4. "Holiday" – 2:39
5. "Butter Lamb" – 4:24
6. "Piano Music" – 1:45
7. "Prism Song" – 3:37
8. "Marmalade" – 4:45
9. "Vertical Ray" – 3:01
10. "Emeralds" – 3:12
11. "Keep On Raging" – 3:17
12. "Piano Music for Lucy" – 3:40

== Personnel ==
- Julie Byrne – guitar, vocals
- Jake Acosta – recording, mixing
- Owen Ashworth – mastering for vinyl edition
- Matthew Barnhart – mastering for vinyl edition
- Caitlin Roberts – cover photography

== See also ==
- List of 2014 albums
