= L'objectif =

English rock band

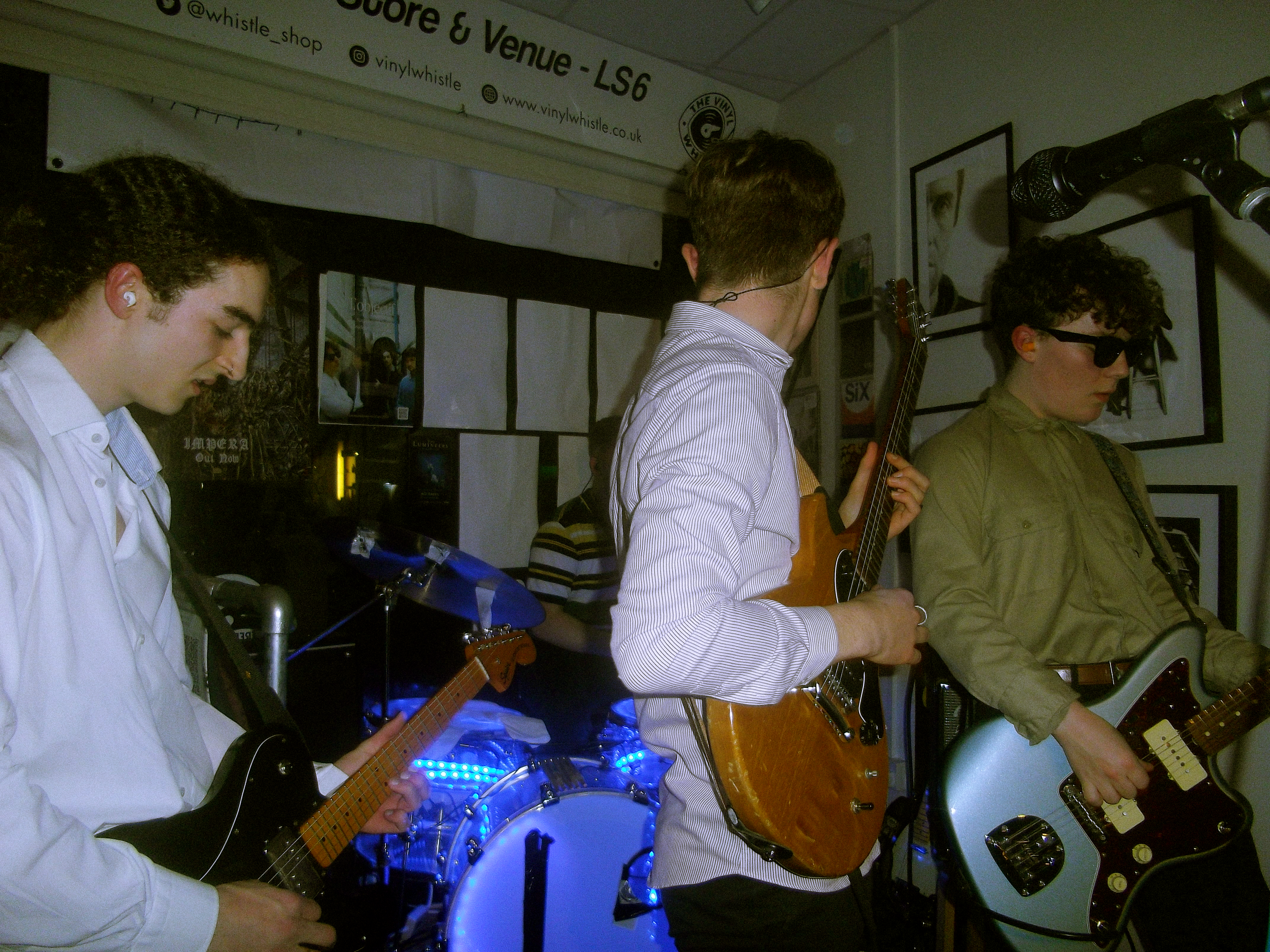
- L'objectif live in 2022

Background information
- Origin: Leeds, West Yorkshire, U.K.
- Genres: Post-punk; indie rock; indie pop; alternative rock
- Years active: 2017–present
- Labels: Chess Club, Mirror
- Members: Saul Kane; Louis Bullock; Abe Hussain; Sam Hudson
- Past members: Dan Richardson; Ezra Glennon
- Website: www.l-objectif.com

L'objectif are an English rock band from Leeds. Formed in 2017 by vocalist and guitarist Saul Kane and drummer Louis Bullock, the band performed as a duo up until 2020, when they recruited guitarist Dan Richardson and bassist Ezra Glennon. Their debut EP Have It Your Way was released on 20 July 2021, through Chess Club Records and Mirror Music Group. The EP's lead single "Drive in Mind" peaked at number one on Free40's Dutch independent music chart.

== History ==
The band was formed by Saul Kane and Louis Bullock in 2017, when the pair were twelve years old. The pair met through performing in plays that their school were putting on. They began rehearsing as a duo, in their school's music classrooms. However, they were unable to perform live during the band's early existence due to their young age not allowing them to enter venues. Their name is taken from the French phrase which translates to "the objective", and was decided during a French lesson the pair had together, when the teacher listed the class's objectives for that lesson. At the beginning of 2020, Ezra Glennon and Dan Richardson became official members of the band, after a period of inconsistently performing live and rehearsing with Kane and Bullock. When the 2020 COVID-19 lockdowns began, Kane and Bullock began recording and sending each other demos of songs.

In early 2021, they signed to the English independent label Chess Club Records and Mirror Music Group, releasing their debut single on the label on 16 March, a song written during the English COVID-19 lockdown. At the same time, the band announced that they would be playing a socially distanced headline concert in Leeds on 27 May. On 25 May, they released their second single "Burn Me Out", and announced that their debut EP Have It Your Way would be released on 20 July. On 22 June, they released their third single "Do It Again". The EP's release was coincided with a livestreamed performance at the Brudenell Social Club. On 3 October, they performed at SoundCity festival. On 16 October, they performed at Live at Leeds festival. On 8 February 2022, they released the single "Same Thing" and announced that it would be a part of their second EP. On 10 March, the band released the single "Get Close", and announced their second EP would be titled We Aren't Getting Out But Tonight We Might and is set for released on 3 June. On 20 September 2023, they released the single "Itsa" and announced they would be doing an intimate headline show at Oporto in Leeds on 22 September, followed by a higher capacity show at Beaverworks on 3 October. During their cover feature interview with Dork about the single, Kane teased that the song would be a part of larger, unannounced upcoming release.

In autumn 2024, Glennon and Richardson departed from the group, being replaced by Abe Hussain on guitar and Sam Hudson on bass.

== Musical style ==
The band's music has been categorised as post-punk, indie rock, alternative rock and indie pop, often making use of elements of funk, jazz, punk rock, dream pop, gothic punk, psychedelia and pop music. Yahoo! News called them "grunge pop", and the Guardian called them "noir pop". Dork magazine writer Finlay Holden described them as a playing a part in the wave of British post-punk gaining popularity in the early-2020s, alongside Black Country, New Road and Dry Cleaning. Their music makes use of angular guitar parts, chaotic rhythms and both gothic and danceable parts. Evening Standard described Kane's vocals as "bring to mind the half-drunk-sounding growls of Iceage’s Elias Rønnenfelt".

NME radio described their single "Drive in Mind" as "more than just 'some music' from a bunch of teens – the blend of angular drum lines, crunchy Foals-style melodies and ferocious riffs is an exciting and promising look at what’s in store for L’Objectif in the near future". Clash magazine described their music as "match[ing] jazz to funk to psychedelia within a guitar pop template". The Sunday Times described their sound as including "a haze of high adrenaline post-punk, New Order–recalling propulsions, with Saul Kane's Morrissey/Jarvis-like vocals and lyrics". Dork magazine described one "defining characteristic" of their sound as "a distinct tone of... well, not pure pessimism, but not exactly optimism either".

In an interview with DIY magazine, Kane cited Morrissey, the Stone Roses and the Arctic Monkeys as the band's earliest influences, and in an interview with Fred Perry clothing, he cited the Arctic Monkeys' song "American Sports" as a song that lyrically inspired him.

== Members ==
Current

- Saul Kane – vocals, guitar (2017–present)
- Louis Bullock – drums (2017–present)
- Abe Hussain – guitar (2024–present)
- Sam Hudson – bass (2024–present)

Former

- Dan Richardson – guitar (2020–2024)
- Ezra Glennon – bass (2020–2024; died 2025)

== Discography ==
EPs

- Have It Your Way (2021)
- We Aren't Getting Out But Tonight We Might (2022)

Singles

- "Another Day, Another Fear" (2020)
- "Annual Event" (2020)
- "Drive in Mind" (2021)
- "Burn Me Out" (2021)
- "Do It Again" (2021)
- "Same Thing" (2022)
- "Get Close" (2022)
- "The Dance You Sell" (2022)
- "Itsa" (2023)
