= Miso Extra =

- Born: Emily Takeuchi-Brown; March 1995 (age 31); Hong Kong
- Genres: Avant-pop; dance pop; electro-pop; hip house; rhythm and blues; sophisti-pop
- Instrument: Vocals
- Years active: 2020–present
- Labels: Transgressive Records
- Website: misoextra.com

Emily Takeuchi-Brown (born March 1995), known professionally as Miso Extra is an English bilingual singer, rapper and producer. After her debut EP Great Taste (2022), she signed with Transgressive Records. She has since released two more EPs and her debut album Earcandy (2025).

== Early life and education ==
Takeuchi-Brown was born in Hong Kong to an English father and a Japanese mother. She spent her early childhood in Japan, where she went to preschool, before moving to Buckinghamshire, England. Takeuchi-Brown learned violin at a young age and joined the school choir. She graduated university before pursuing music professionally.

== Career ==
Takeuchi-Brown had experimented with music production for many years until the COVID-19 lockdown, during which she started formulating her Miso Extra persona and making music professionally. In 2021, she released her debut single "Adventures of Tricky N Duke", as well as "1013" and "Deep Fried". She had her first major live gig at Liverpool Sound City that October. In March 2022, Takeuchi-Brown released her debut EP Great Taste. The music video for the titular track was directed by Sarah Dattani Tucker and featured Nayana Iz. That year, she performed at The Great Escape Festival, Dot to Dot Festival and Reading and Leeds on the BBC Music Introducing stage.

In 2023, Takeuchi-Brown signed a recording contract with Transgressive Records, through which she released her second EP MSG. This was accompanied by the singles "Space Junk", "R10" and "50/50". Later in the year came the standalone single "2nd Floor" alongside a cover of Little Dragon's "Constant Surprises".

Returning to the 2024 Great Eacape, Takeuchi-Brown released the single "Slow Down" that summer. She subsequently supported the Irish rapper Rejjie Snow and then Kelly Lee Owens on tour. In November 2024, Takeuchi-Beown released the single "Good Kisses" featuring Joseph Mount of Metronomy. "Good Kisses" was nominated for Best Independent Track at the 2025 AIM Independent Music Awards. After the early 2025 singles "Certified", "Ghostly", and "POP", Takeuchi-Brown's debut studio album Earcandy was released in May 2025. She also remixed Kelly Lee Owens' song "Sunshine". She made her Glastonbury Festival debut and supported Sabrina Carpenter at BST Hyde Park.

== Artistry ==
Takeuchi-Brown's second single "1013" was inspired by MF Doom's "Accordian". She named Rosie Lowe as a vocal production influence and played Casisdead "a lot" while making her second EP MSG. She felt encouraged by Chai's "playful use" of bilingual Japanese–English lyrics. She also appreciated Ama Lou's "soulful vocal style" and Noname's "penmanship".

Regarding her debut album Earcandy, Takeuchi-Brown named Hiatus Kaiyote, Justice and Nao as influences. The track "Ghostly" was co-written with A.K. Paul, one of her "heroes" alongside his brother Jai, and drew upon Solange. There are also nods to M.I.A. Other artists she has mentioned include Daft Punk, Joe Hisaishi, J Dilla and Kelis. In 2024, Takeuchi-Brown praised contemporaries Merry Lamb Lamb, Fabiana Palladino, Raye and Ayrton. She has described her production style as "maximalist".

== Discography ==
=== Albums ===
- Earcandy (2025)

=== EPs ===
- Great Taste (2022)
- MSG (2023)
- Ghostly (2025)

=== Singles ===
- "Adventures of Tricky n Duke" (2021)
- "1013" (2021)
- "Deep Fried" (2021)
- "Great Taste" (2022) featuring Nayana Iz
- "Space Junk" (2023)
- "R10" (2023)
- "50/50" (2023)
- "2nd Floor" (2023)
- "Slow Down" (2024)
- "Good Kisses" (2024) featuring Metronomy
- "Certified" (2025)
- "Ghostly" (2025)
- "POP" (2025)
- "Right Here" (2026)
