= Rachika Nayar =

American musician

- Also known as: Rachika S
- Born: State College, Pennsylvania, US
- Genres: Experimental; ambient
- Years active: 2018–present
- Labels: NNA Tapes; RVNG Intl.

Rachika Nayar is an American experimental musician based in Brooklyn, New York.

== History ==
Nayar was born and raised in State College, Pennsylvania. Her parents were professors at Pennsylvania State University. She first released music under the name of Rachika S. Her first release, Themes For A Film (2018) was a rescoring of the soundtrack to the anime film Tekkonkinkreet (2006). The next year she developed the soundtrack for and starred in the film So Pretty (2019). Nayar released music as Rachika Nayar for all subsequent releases. She released her first full-length album in 2021, titled Our Hands Against The Dusk. The title is a reference to a poem by poet Richard Jackson. The same year, Nayar released a collection of songs called Fragments. Nayar released her second full-length album in 2022, titled Heaven Come Crashing, through NNA Tapes. The album was named Stereogum's "Album of the Week". The album received "Best New Music" designation from Pitchfork. In April 2023, Nayar released an expanded version of Fragments. Alongside the announcement, Nayar released a new song titled "hawthorn".

Nayar has been dubbed by Paste "The Best of What's Next".

== Artistry ==
Nayar's music has been described as experimental and ambient music. She states that she prefers making music in such genres because she feels they "reside more in the abstracted realms of the pre-verbal or subconscious or [...] spiritual." Her debut album was inspired by the French musical group M83 as well as the soundtrack of Ghost in the Shell (1995).

== Discography ==
=== Studio albums ===
List of studio albums
| Title | Album details |
|---|---|
| Our Hands Against The Dusk | Released: March 5, 2021; Label: NNA Tapes; Format: LP, digital download, streaming, cassette tape |
| Heaven Come Crashing | Released: August 26, 2022; Label: NNA Tapes; Format: LP, digital download, streaming, cassette tape |

=== Collaborative studio albums ===
List of collaborative studio albums
| Title | Album details |
|---|---|
| Disiniblud (with Nina Keith as Disiniblud) | Released: July 18, 2025; Label: Smugglers Way; Format: LP, CD, digital download, streaming, cassette tape |

=== Reissues ===
List of reissues
| Title | Album details |
|---|---|
| fragments (expanded) | Released: April 7, 2023; Label: RVNG Intl.; Format: LP, digital download, streaming, cassette tape |

=== Extended plays ===
List of extended plays
| Title | EP Details |
|---|---|
| Themes For A Film (as Rachika S) | Released: October 12, 2018; Label: Loveless Records; Format: Digital download, streaming |
| fragments | Released: August 13, 2021; Label: RVNG Intl.; Format: Streaming |
