= Urika's Bedroom =

American bedroom pop musician

Tchad Cousins, better known by their stage name Urika's Bedroom, is an American bedroom pop musician based in Los Angeles.

== History ==
Urika's Bedroom grew up in the Midwest. They were originally a member of the punk band 2070. In 2024, Cousins self-produced and self-released his debut studio album titled Big Smile, Black Mire. In May and June 2025, Cousins supported Perfume Genius on his "Glory Tour". Cousins has also supported Nourished by Time on tour.

== Discography ==
=== Studio albums ===
- Big Smile, Black Mire (True Panther, 2024)
