= Kevin Krauter =

American musician

- Origin: Indiana, U.S.
- Genres: Indie pop, indie rock, shoegaze
- Labels: Winspear, Bayonet

Kevin Paul Krauter is an American singer, songwriter, and musician. He was a founding member of the indie pop group Hoops until their disbandment in 2020. He is currently a member of the band Wishy. In 2018, Krauter released his debut solo album, Toss Up. In 2020, Krauter released his second solo album, Full Hand.

== Career ==
Krauter formed Hoops with school friends Drew Auscherman, Keagan Beresford, and James Harris in 2014. The next year he released his debut solo EP, Magnolia via Winspear.

Hoops released three "tapes", one EP and two albums before announcing their hiatus in 2018. On November 12, 2019, Hoops released a single, "They Say", their first since 2017.

In 2016, Krauter released "Fantasy Theme".

In January 2020, Krauter contributed to Bernie Speaks With the Community, a benefit compilation organized by indie band Strange Ranger in support of Bernie Sanders's presidential campaign. He also contributed to the second Strange Ranger benefit compilation, The Song is Coming From Inside the House, that raised funds for marginalized communities during the COVID-19 pandemic.

Krauter released his sophomore album "Full Hand" on February 29, 2020, via Bayonet Records. Prior to album release, Krauter released 4 singles – Pretty Boy, Surprise, Green Eyes, and Opportunity.

Since the hiatus of Hoops, Krauter has toured as a solo artist with Unknown Mortal Orchestra, The Marías, Triathlon, Beach Fossils, Soccer Mommy, Hovvdy, and others. Krauter also contributed a song to Bernie Speaks with the Community, a benefit compilation produced to raise money for the Bernie Sanders 2020 presidential campaign.

== Personal life ==
A native of Indiana, Krauter attended Carmel High School in Carmel before attending Ball State University, where they studied communications. Krauter left college before their senior year to focus on their music career.

Krauter is bisexual and non-binary and uses he/him and they/them pronouns.
