= Hoops (band) =

American indie pop band

- Origin: Indiana
- Genres: Indie pop, dream pop
- Years active: 2014–2018, 2019–2020
- Label: Fat Possum Records
- Past members: Drew Auscherman; Kevin Krauter; Keagan Beresford; James Harris
- Website: hoops.bandcamp.com

Hoops was an American indie pop band from Bloomington, Indiana.

== History ==
Hoops began as a solo project for musician Drew Auscherman. In December 2011, this first version of Hoops debuted with the song Commercial, followed by a dual-song release called Avian Way later in the month. Auscherman recruited the rest of the band members in 2011 while they were all juniors in high school, however, they had all been friends since sixth grade. After Auscherman's solo Hoops releases of Rosie's Garden (2012) and the full-length Little Pleasures (2014), the full-band Hoops released their first tape titled Tape #1 in 2015, which contains versions of Little Pleasures songs "Be There" and "Grass," the former of which was re-recorded for the release. Hoops later released two more tapes, #2 and #3 in 2015 and 2016 respectively. Following a live session with Audiotree Live in July 2016, Hoops released their first self-titled EP on Fat Possum Records. Hoops then released their first full-length album with Fat Possum, titled Routines, in May 2017, which reached #21 on the Billboard Top Heatseekers chart. In November 2017, Hoops released the compilation of their full-band tapes, titled Tapes #1-3 on vinyl.

On July 18, 2018, the band announced on their Facebook page that they were on an indefinite hiatus.

On November 12, 2019, Hoops released a single, "They Say", after over a year on hiatus.

The band subsequently announced a full-length album, Halo, which was to be released on October 2, 2020. They released the album's first single, "Fall Back", on June 24, 2020.

On July 30, 2020, Hoops announced on Instagram that they would be breaking up after alleged account(s) of sexual abuse had been revealed, in which acts were allegedly conducted by former member James Harris. Auscherman also cited his own issues of emotional abuse towards partners and friends, which had been instrumental to the band's previous hiatus, as to why it would be unacceptable for Hoops to continue as a band with the sort of platform it had. Concurrently, Fat Possum Records announced that they would no longer be releasing the album Halo in light of the allegations, with all pre-orders to be refunded as soon as possible.

== Musical influences ==
Vocalist Drew Auscherman cites Hall & Oates as well as Michael Jackson and the band Felt as influences. Bassist Kevin Krauter says that the band's biggest influences are lo-fi bands such as Real Estate and The Radio Dept.

== Discography ==
Studio albums

- Routines (2017, Fat Possum)

EPs

- Hoops EP (2016, Fat Possum)

Compilations

- Tapes #1–3 (2017, Fat Possum)
- Tape #1 (2015, Circuit Public Broadcasting)
- Tape #2 (2015, Circuit Public Broadcasting)
- Tape #3 (2016, self-released)

Auscherman solo Hoops releases

- Commercial (2011, self-released)
- Avian Way (2011, self-released)
- Rosie's Garden (2012, self-released)
- Hoops (2012, self-released)
- Little Pleasures (2014, self-released)
