= Alewya =

British singer-songwriter

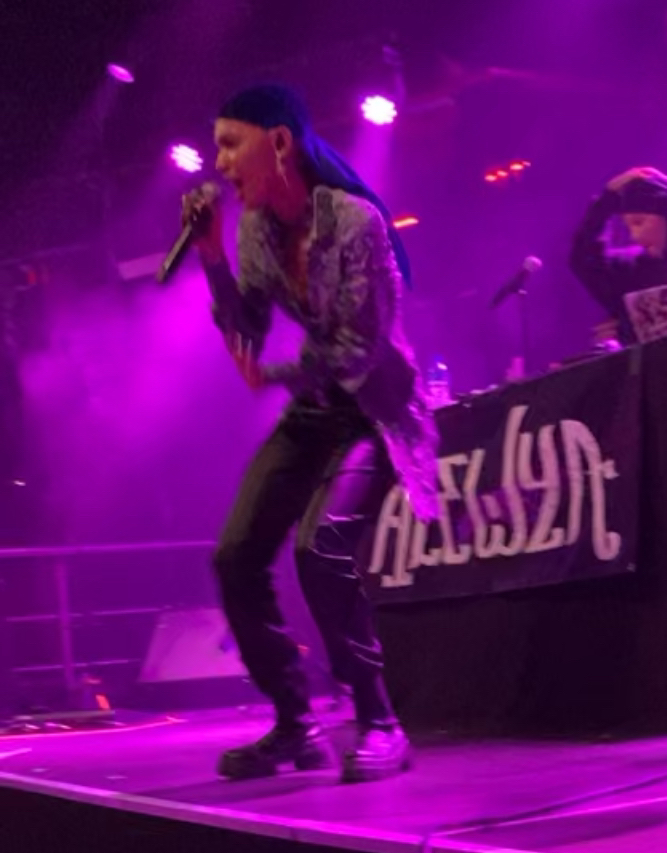
- Alewya performing in 2021
- Born: Alewya Demmisse; Saudi Arabia
- Modelling information
- Height: 1.78 m (5 ft 10 in)
- Hair colour: Brown
- Eye colour: Brown
- Agency: Elite Model Management (Paris); Fabbrica Milano (Milan); The Squad (London); M4 Models (Hamburg); CODE Management (Amsterdam)

Alewya Demmisse, known artistically as Alewya (pronounced ah-leh-wee-yah), is a British singer, songwriter, producer, multidisciplinary artist, and model.

== Biography ==
Demmisse was born in Saudi Arabia to a Sudanese-raised Egyptian father and an Ethiopian mother. She was brought up in Sudan before her family relocated to the UK as refugees when she was five and then grew up in West London. She is heavily influenced by her African and Arab roots. Her name means "the highest" in Amharic.

She released her debut single "Sweating" in mid-2020. The song was produced by UK and Ghana-based production duo Busy Twist and was mixed and mastered by Shy FX. The video accompanying the song includes some of her visual art and was directed by Jack Bowden. She later made a guest appearance on Little Simz's track "Where's My Lighter".

British entertainment website NME included Demmisse in its fifth edition of "The NME 100: Essential emerging artists for 2021" selection.

The artist's second single, "The Code", was released on 17 March. It is a collaborative record with British drummer, producer and composer Moses Boyd, who also appears in the song's live performance video.

In the summer of 2021, she supported rapper Little Simz on a tour across the UK.

Demmisse is also a sculptor and illustrator. In March 2021, she starred in Tall Are the Roots, a short film directed by Fenn O'Meally for Byredo.

In November 2021, Demisse performed "Ethiopia", a track from her EP Panther in Mode on A Colors Show.

== Modelling ==
While dancing on the set of the film Kids in Love, she was discovered by Cara Delevingne, who got Demisse to sign with her modelling agency. At the time, Demisse had been accepted into King's College to study maths and philosophy and was working as a waitress and as a marketing assistant before the semester started. She was introduced and presented as "new model obsession" by Vogue in September 2014, and at that time her agencies were Women in New York and Storm in London.

She walked the DKNY runway at Mercedes-Benz Fashion Week Spring 2015 in September 2014.

== Discography ==
=== Albums ===
- Zero (2026)

=== EPs ===
- Panther in Mode (2021)

=== Singles ===
- "Sweating" (2020)
- "The Code" (2021)
- "Jagna" (2021)
- "Sprit_X" (2021)
- "Play" (2021)
