= Julie Byrne =

American singer-songwriter

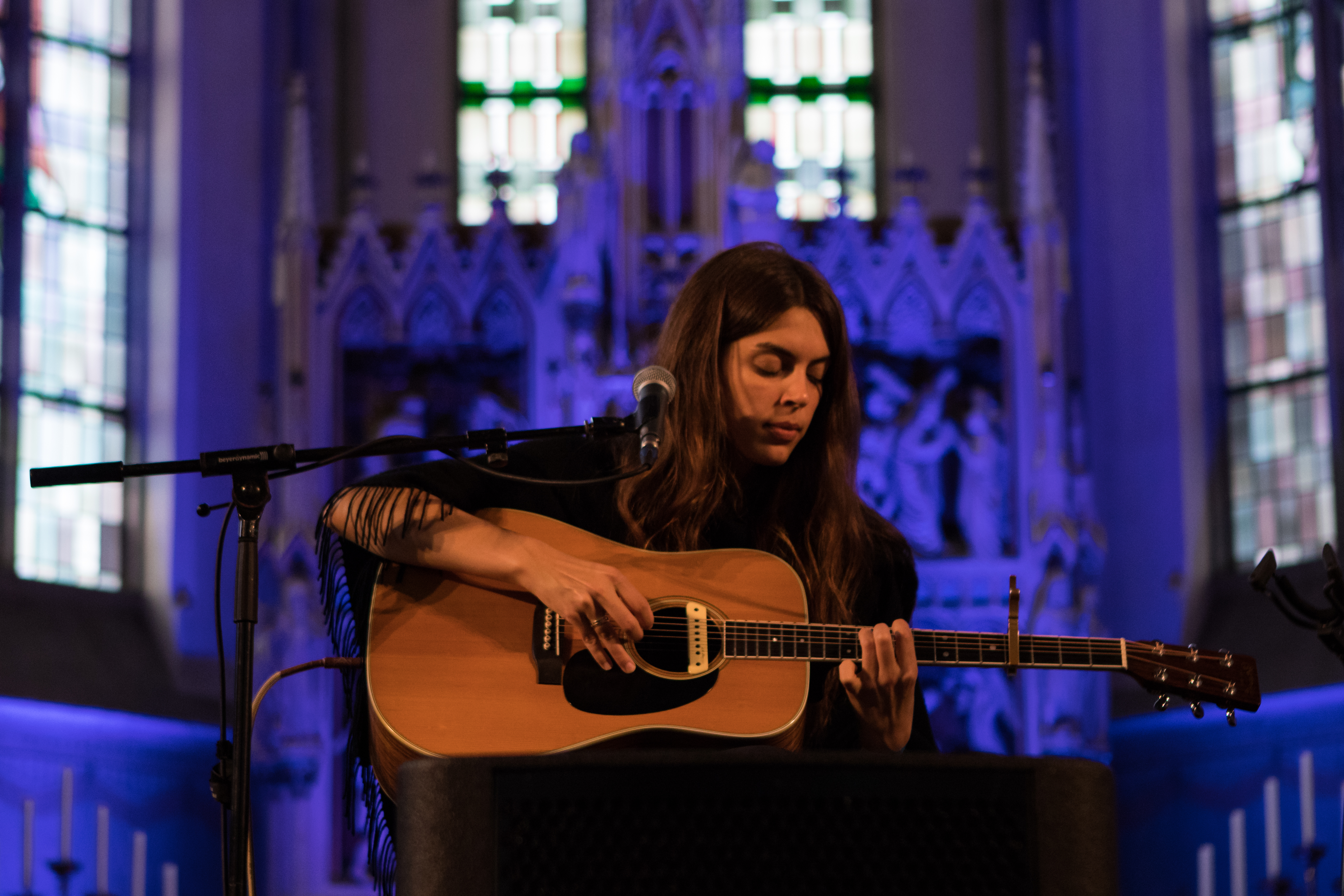
- Byrne at Haldern Pop Festival, 2017

Background information
- Born: 1990 (age 34–35); Buffalo, New York, United States
- Genres: Indie folk
- Instrument(s): Vocals, guitar
- Years active: 2012–present
- Labels: Ghostly International, Ba Da Bing Records, Basin Rock, Orindal
- Website: Official website

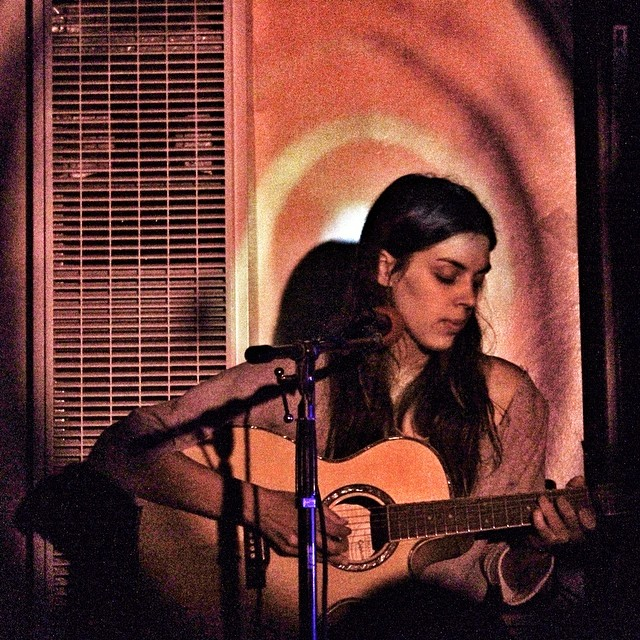
Byrne c. 2014

Julie Marie Byrne (born 1990) is an American singer, songwriter, and guitarist from Buffalo, New York. To date, she has released three studio albums, Rooms with Walls and Windows (2014), Not Even Happiness (2017), and The Greater Wings (2023).

== Biography ==
Born and raised in Buffalo, New York, Byrne was influenced by her father's guitar playing at an early age: "I grew up with the sound of his playing, which was fingerstyle guitar, so I would say that my style is completely rooted in his influence." At the age of seventeen, Byrne began learning the instrument herself, after her father could no longer play due to complications from multiple sclerosis: "The opportunity to play his instrument and honor the legacy of his craft and all of the time it took for him to cultivate a skill that he ultimately had to find a way to give up—it feels like a bit of an offering to him." At the age of 18, Byrne left Buffalo, living in various cities in America including Pittsburgh, Northampton, Chicago, Lawrence, Seattle, and New Orleans.

== Personal life ==
In addition to her recording and touring work, Byrne has studied environmental science, and, in 2016, worked at New York City's Central Park as a seasonal ranger. She notes, "[I] came to view it as a sanctuary, not only for New Yorkers to experience their connection to nature but also for the wildlife that takes refuge there. While the surrounding neighborhoods don’t reflect the same ethos, the parks do belong to the people of New York and the Parks Department upholds that mission. I liked working in that form of service to the public."

Byrne was in a relationship with Eric Littmann, who would later become a friend and musical collaborator. His unexpected death in 2021 influenced her third album The Greater Wings which he had been producing.

== Discography ==
Studio albums

- Rooms with Walls and Windows (2014, made up of two cassette-only EPs)
- Not Even Happiness (2017)
- The Greater Wings (2023)

EPs

- You Would Love It Here (2012, collected on Rooms with Walls and Windows)
- Julie Byrne (2013, collected on Rooms with Walls and Windows)
- Julie Byrne with Laugh Cry Laugh (2023, with Laugh Cry Laugh)
