= En Attendant Ana =

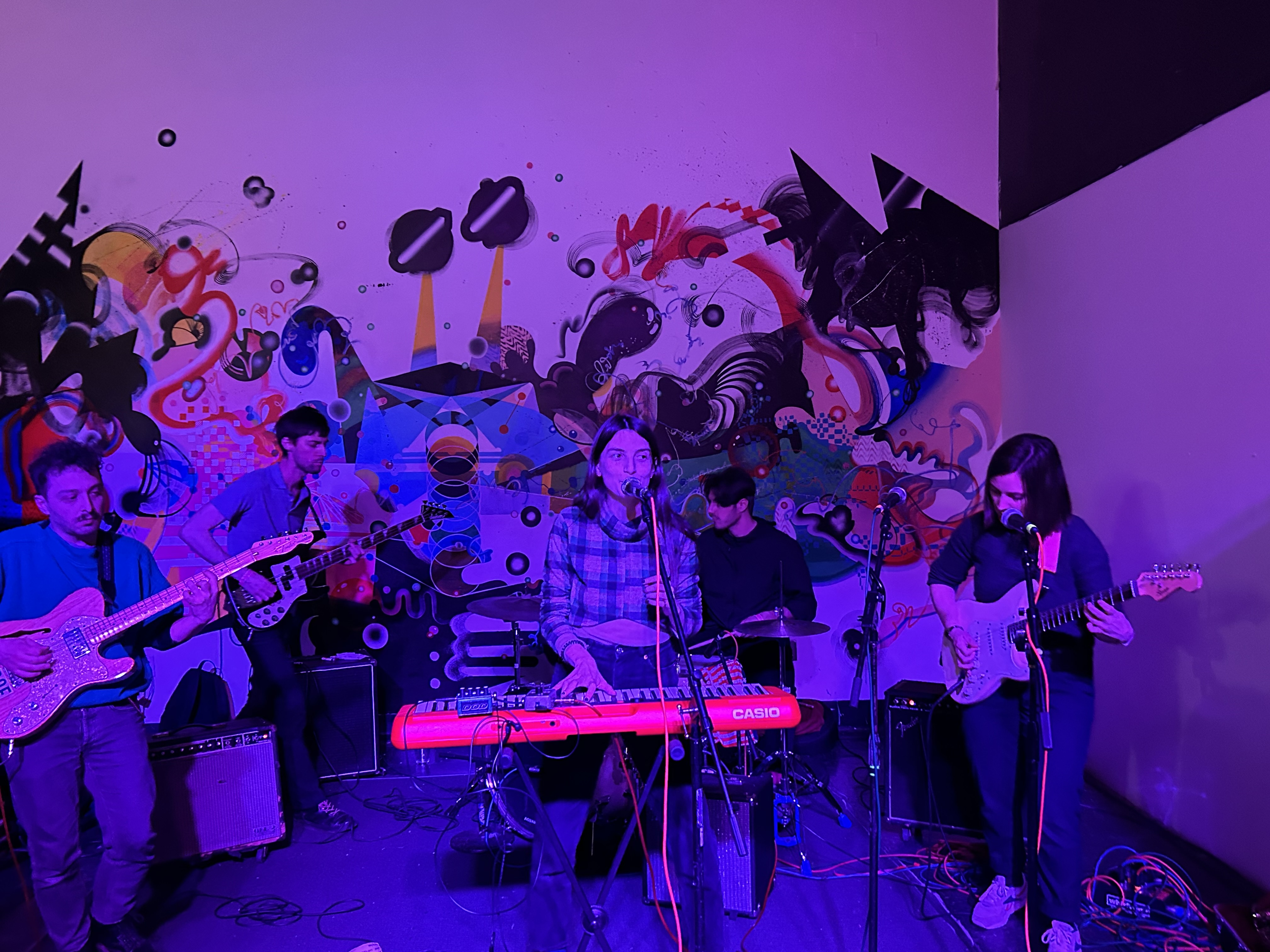
- En Attendant Ana performing in Seattle in 2023. From left to right: Maxence Tomasso, Vincent Hivert, Margaux Bouchaudon, Adrien Pollin, Camille Fréchou.

Background information
- Origin: Paris, France
- Genres: Rock; Indie rock; Garage pop
- Years active: 2014–present
- Labels: Buddy Records, Montagne Sacrée, Trouble in Mind Records
- Members: Margaux Bouchaudon; Camille Fréchou; Adrien Pollin; Maxence Tomasso; Vincent Hivert
- Past members: Pauline Marin; Romain Meaulard; Antoine Vaugelade

En Attendant Ana is a French rock band

== History ==
=== Founding and EP ===
En Attendant Ana was formed in Paris in 2014. The name translates to "Waiting for Ana" which originates from an incident where a waitress at a bar in Brussels stopped to yell at a belligerent customer before bringing the band members their drinks. In 2015, they recorded a song, "Time", for a compilation album by Buddy Records. In 2016, their first EP, Songs from the Cave, was released by Buddy Records. It consists of 6 tracks, which were recorded in one day in a cellar in Yvelines. Soon after the release, they began performing live shows in France.

=== Lost & Found ===
Following their EP, En Attendant Ana acquired an American distribution via Trouble in Mind, a Chicago-based label that scouted for European artists. Their debut album, Lost & Found, was released in April 2018. They toured in France, Switzerland, Belgium, the Netherlands, and the eastern United States.

=== Juillet ===
Their second album, Juillet, was released in January 2020 exclusively by Trouble in Mind. It was written in six months and recorded by Vincent Hivert and Alexis Fugain in one week at Studio Claudio in the Ile-de-France countryside. Juillet has a different style from previous albums due to the addition of a new guitarist, Maxence Tomasso, from the garage band Entracte Twist. The new style is less wild than their previous albums and more focused on arrangements, structure, and songwriting.

=== Principia ===
In November 2022, the band released the single "Principia", the first single from their upcoming album, Principia. The second single, "Same Old Story", was released on January 6, 2023, with a music video directed by Ilhan Palayret.

The Principia album was released on February 24, 2023, by Trouble in Mind. It received a very positive critical reception, described by BenzineMag as their best album to date and one of the great French albums of 2023, particularly because of the brass.

In December, the album was ranked as the 6th best album of 2023 by Time Magazine.

== Members ==
- Margaux Bouchaudon : vocals, guitar, claviers
- Camille Fréchou : trumpet, guitar, backing vocals
- Adrien Pollin : drums (since 2017)
- Maxence Tomasso : guitar (since 2018)
- Vincent Hivert : bass (since 2020)

Past members:

- Pauline Marin (drums, 2015–2017)
- Romain Meaulard (guitar, 2015–2018)
- Antoine Vaugelade (bass, 2015–2020)

== Albums ==
Studio albums

- Lost & Found, 2018 (Montagne Sacrée, Buddy Records and Trouble in Mind)
- Juillet, 2020 (Trouble in Mind)
- Principia, 2023 (Trouble in Mind)

Singles and EPs

- Songs from the cave, 2015 (Buddy Records and Montagne Sacrée)
