= Rejjie Snow =

- Also known as: Rejjie Snow; Lecs Luther; The Snowman
- Born: Alexander Anyaegbunam; Dublin, Ireland
- Genres: Alternative hip hop, alternative R&B
- Occupations: Rapper; songwriter; record producer
- Years active: 2012–present
- Labels: Honeymoon; 300; BMG
- Website: rejjiesnow.com

Alexander Anyaegbunam better known by his stage name Rejjie Snow, is an Irish rapper and songwriter from Drumcondra, Dublin.

== Early life ==
RejjieSnow was born Alexander Anyaegbunam in Dublin, Ireland, to a Nigerian father and an Irish-Jamaican mother. Dublin is his hometown. He attended Belvedere College SJ. Later in 2011, he relocated to the United States and began attending school at Montverde Academy in Florida to play soccer on an athletic scholarship. After graduating high school in 2012, he attended Savannah College of Art and Design in Savannah, Georgia on an athletic scholarship to study film and design. After a semester, he dropped out and moved back to Ireland and focused on his music career. As of May 2021, Snow has a daughter.

== Career ==
Snow released his debut EP, Rejovich, in June 2013. It immediately topped the iTunes Hip-Hop chart, ahead of releases from Kanye West and J. Cole. Its track, "1992", went on to surpass one million YouTube views, along with the previously released "Lost in Empathy". In June 2015, Snow released his official debut single with the Cam O'bi-produced "All Around the World". The video, featuring Lily-Rose Depp, was played 500,000 times in its first week. In December 2015, Snow released his follow-up "Blakkst Skn", produced by Kaytranada.

In 2016, Snow signed with 300 Entertainment (with marketing from BMG Rights Management), with whom he released the track "D.R.U.G.S" in September. Snow subsequently confirmed that his long-awaited album, titled Dear Annie, was near completion.

In May 2017, he released a free mixtape titled The Moon & You.

Snow's debut album, Dear Annie, was finally released on 16 February 2018, subsequently ranking in the best-albums-of-2018 year-end list NME (49th). He also featured vocals on Clairo's song "Hello?" in 2018.

In 2021, he released his second album Baw Baw Black Sheep; in 2024, his third album PEACE 2 DA WORLD was released.

== Discography ==
Studio albums

- Dear Annie (2018)
- Baw Baw Black Sheep (2021)
- PEACE 2 DA WORLD (2024)

Mixtapes

- The Moon & You (2017)

EPs

- Rejovich (2013)
- Dear Annie, Vol. 1 - EP (2018)
- Dear Annie, Vol. 2 - EP (2018)
