= On the Northline =

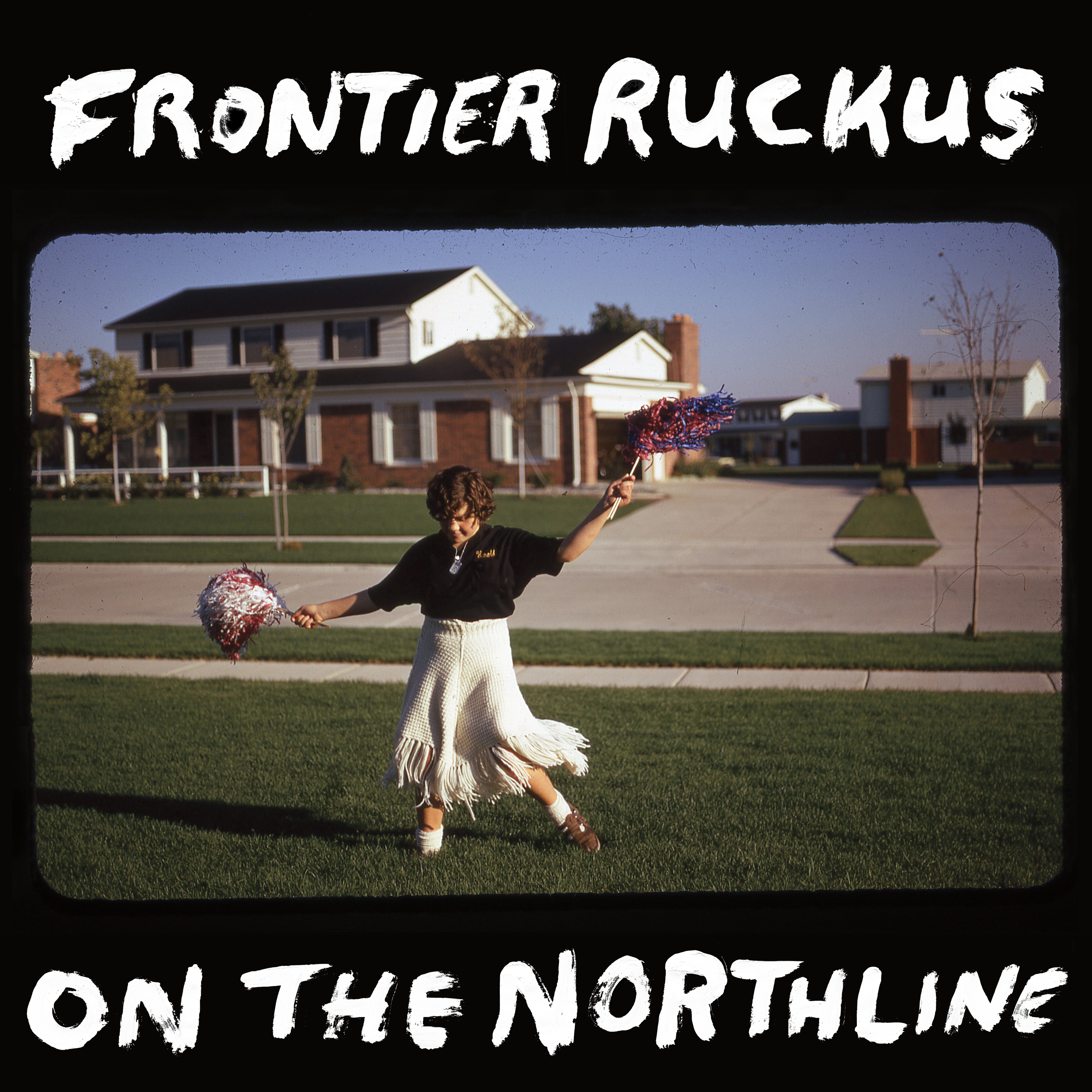

Studio album by Frontier Ruckus
- Released: February 16, 2024
- Genre: Folk rock, indie pop
- Language: English
- Label: Sitcom Universe, Loose Music (Europe)

Frontier Ruckus chronology
Enter the Kingdom (2017)	On the Northline (2024)

Professional ratings
Review scores
Source	Rating
Uncut	8/10 stars
Daily Express	4/5 stars
Americana UK	8/10 stars

On the Northline is the sixth full-length studio album by Frontier Ruckus. It was the band's first major output since 2017, ending a seven-year recording hiatus.

== Production ==
Recorded in Ypsilanti, Michigan to the TASCAM 388 of engineer Ben Collins, the record took on more of the homespun, analog production approach of lead singer Matthew Milia's solo albums Alone at St. Hugo and Keego Harbor. In this regard, it was also heralded as a return to the ungarnished and emotionally raw ethos of the band's earlier work. Appearing on the podcast of Old 97's lead singer Rhett Miller, Milia talked about the change in direction following their "Nashville" record, 2017's Enter the Kingdom:

“This record is way more back to basics—we kind of see it as a sequel to our first album from 2008, The Orion Songbook. Back when we had no idea what the hell we were doing, when there’s bleed on all the instruments but there’s something so charming in the naiveté.”

Thematically, the album continues songwriter Matthew Milia's perennial obsession with his native environment of Metro Detroit. Speaking to REVUE, Milia explained:

“Metro Detroit is a very amorphously large and complex region of all these colliding communities and socioeconomic identities, and I’ve always been endlessly fascinated with how it all comes together. So I just kind of endlessly investigate that in my songs.”

But as the first Frontier Ruckus album since Milia's getting married and becoming a father, On the Northline also evoked a deeper domestic introspection than ever. Speaking on this life change, he continued:

“I had met the love of my life and realized I didn’t want a tour or 200 dates a year to make a living…This isn’t revolutionary, to nestle oneself into domestic life. But for me, it was very different from the way I spent my 20s, which was sleeping on floors and touring in a van with my best friends."

Instrumentally, banjo player David Jones pursued increasingly intricate melodic lines in orchestrated counterpoint to multi-instrumentalist Zachary Nichols' complex arrangements on trumpet, melodica, and musical saw—prompting Americana UK to comment: "Urban decay set to Banjos and 60s psych mean a welcome return for an always good band."

Speaking to The Oakland Press, Milia said the band "limited ourselves to acoustic instruments" in an effort to keep things simple and to serve the song at all costs, continuing: "You’re free to just let the songs sing. There’s a real intimacy to serving the song and letting that be the predominant message...I think people are attracted to that kind of unadulterated rawness."

== Reception ==
The album received a warm critical reception, especially in the United Kingdom where the band embarked on a release tour supporting The Handsome Family. A Metro Times cover story commented on the universal appeal of Milia's lyricism, despite their pertaining hyper-specifically to Michigan places and themes:

“Based on the positive reactions to Northline’s three singles, it’s also clear that Frontier Ruckus’ dedicated fan base, even if they aren’t Michiganders, are still hungry for these mitten-state ruminations.”

KLOF Magazine commented on the record's balance of emotions by saying: "If adolescent melancholy and nostalgic yearning are both constants in the Frontier Ruckus musical firmament, then the redemptive power of love is still the star that shines brightest – especially when life can appear at its bleakest. Highly recommended."

Uncut magazine described the album as a "tremendous sixth from consistently inventive Michigan trio... further demonstrations of something special and still under-appreciated."

== Track listing ==
All songs written by Matthew Milia, except "Wherefore" by Zachary Nichols

1. "Swore I Had a Friend"
2. "Everywhere but beside You"
3. "Magdalene (That's Not Your Name)"
4. "On the Northline"
5. "Mercury Sable"
6. "Clarkston Pasture"
7. "In the Money"
8. "Bloomfield Marriott"
9. "First Song for Lauren"
10. "The Machines of Summer"
11. "I'm Not the Boy"
12. "Wherefore"

== Personnel ==
Frontier Ruckus

- Matthew Milia – lead vocals, acoustic guitar, harmonica, mandolin
- David Winston Jones – banjo, vocals
- Zachary Nichols – trumpet, singing-saw, melodica, chord organ

Guest musicians

- Connor Dodson – drums, tambourine, shaker
- Evan Eklund - bass guitar, vocals
- Pete Ballard – pedal steel guitar
- Ben Collins - mandolin, bass guitar

Production

- Produced by Frontier Ruckus and Ben Collins
- Engineered by Ben Collins
- Mixed by Ben Collins and Frontier Ruckus
- Mastered by Jeff Lipton and Maria Rice at Peerless Mastering
- Layout and Design by Matthew Milia and Morgan McPeak
- Cover concept by Matthew Milia, photographed by J. Christopher Milia
