= Deadmalls and Nightfalls =

Studio album by Frontier Ruckus
- Released: July 20, 2010
- Genre: Folk rock
- Language: English
- Label: Ramseur Records

Frontier Ruckus chronology
Way Upstate and the Crippled Summer, pt. 1 (2009)	Deadmalls and Nightfalls (2010)	Way Upstate and the Crippled Summer, pt. 2 (2011)

Professional ratings
Review scores
Source	Rating
PopMatters	9/10 stars
AllMusic	4/5 stars
Under the Radar	6/10 stars
No Depression	(Favorable)
Real Detroit Weekly	4/5 stars
Metro Times	(Favorable)

Deadmalls and Nightfalls is the second full-length studio album by Frontier Ruckus, released on July 20, 2010, by Ramseur Records.

== Reception ==
The album received positive reviews. PopMatters stated that the record "not only outdoes its predecessor, it reaches a level of top-notch songwriting most groups never attain on a greatest hits compilation"—calling it "a musical map to the psyches of its performers."

Under the Radar wrote that Deadmalls and Nightfalls paints pictures, in vivid imagery of American scenery, life, and love, with not a single word misplaced in its poetic grace, an album meant to be combed through and listed to time and again, an album to bask in."

The album can be seen as the second installment in a trilogy of Matthew Milia's personal mythology set in Metro Detroit—bridging The Orion Songbook and Eternity of Dimming. Songs such as "Pontiac, the Nighbrink"—an intensely detailed depiction of Pontiac, Michigan—foreshadowed the zoomed-in specificity with which Eternity would explore further themes of memory and suburban space.

"Does Me In" was used in the documentary My Heart Is an Idiot which follows the love life of This American Life contributor Davy Rothbart.

Ryan Adams was a vocal fan of the album tweeting: ""Loving the new Frontier Ruckus! Great band...this is what I want to get back to. Those tunes go forever..."

The band performed several songs from the record for a Daytrotter session in 2010.

This was the first album by Frontier Ruckus to be accompanied by music videos, with a video shot for "Nerves of the Nightmind" in Los Angeles by Michael Fisk and a video for "The Upper Room" shot by David Meiklejohn in Portland, Maine.

Way Upstate and the Crippled Summer, pt. 2—an EP of five alternative country songs—was released on the fourth side of the Deadmalls and Nightfalls vinyl package in spring of 2011.

== Track listing ==
All songs written by Matthew Milia

1. "Nerves of the Nightmind"
2. "Ontario"
3. "Springterror"
4. "Ringbearer"
5. "Silverfishes"
6. "The Upper Room"
7. "Does Me In"
8. "The Tower"
9. "Pontiac, the Nightbrink"
10. "How Could I Abandon?"
11. "I Do Need Saving"
12. "Pour Your Nighteyes"

== Personnel ==
Frontier Ruckus

- Matthew Milia – lead vocals, guitar, harmonica, pedal steel guitar, piano, bass guitar, harmonium
- David Winston Jones – banjo, dobro, voice, mandolin, ebow
- Zachary Nichols – trumpet, singing-saw, melodica, alto horn, euphonium, voice, harmonium
- Ryan "Smalls" Etzcorn – drum kit, all percussions
- Anna Burch – voice, bass guitar

Guest Musicians

- Ryan Hay – piano and Hammond organ on tracks 1, 2, 4, 9
- John Krohn – bass guitar on track 9
- Jim Roll – fiddle on track 7

== Production ==
- Produced by Frontier Ruckus
- Engineered and Mixed by Jim Roll
- Mastered by Brent Lambert
- Artwork and Design by Matthew Milia and Richard Maisano
- Recorded and Mixed at Backseat Productions in Ann Arbor, Michigan during the winter of 2009–2010
