= The Orion Songbook =

Studio album by Frontier Ruckus
- Released: November 6, 2008
- Genre: Folk rock
- Language: English
- Label: Quite Scientific Records

Frontier Ruckus chronology
I Am The Water You Are Pumping (2007)	The Orion Songbook (2008)	Way Upstate and the Crippled Summer, pt. 1 (2009)

Professional ratings
Review scores
Source	Rating
AllMusic	4.5/5 stars
Under the Radar	8/10 stars
Crawdaddy!	(Favorable)
[Hear/Say]	(A−)
Real Detroit Weekly	4.5/5 stars
Metro Times	(Favorable)

The Orion Songbook is the debut album by Frontier Ruckus, released on November 6, 2008. Pronounced (/ˈɒriən/ ORR-ee-ən), the title is a reference to the Michigan town of Lake Orion in northern Metro Detroit.

== Reception ==
The album received positive reviews, with Allmusic stating that it is "about as good a debut as a band can hope for." Crawdaddy! praised the album's musical and lyrical landscapes, marked by the "desolate beauty of Matthew Milia's poetry and the quiet intensity the band brings to every note it plays." The album received similar applause from Under the Radar regarding the interplay of musicality and language, described as "white-hot folk music" paired with "dank and smart turns of phrase." Hear/Say called The Orion Songbook "the year's best alt-country album," establishing the band as a "formidable outfit with a sound to reckon with and an easy confidence to match." Likewise, Metro Times stated that the album "establishes the group as already one of the very best sounds to come out of Michigan this entire decade." Inland Empire Weekly commended the record for its consideration of memory "without the cloying nostalgia or self-consciousness that derails so many attempts to turn back the clock to allegedly purer times," going on to state: "...by looking the present straight in the eye, Milia’s created something timeless."

Adult Swim used "Dark Autumn Hour" for four ads in their well-known series of bumps, first airing in September 2011.

== Track listing ==
All songs written by Matthew Milia

1. "Animals Need Animals"
2. "The Latter Days"
3. "What You Are"
4. "Dark Autumn Hour"
5. "Mount Marcy"
6. "The Blood"
7. "Bethlehem"
8. "Foggy Lilac Windows"
9. "Orion Town 2"
10. "The Back-Lot World"
11. "Rosemont"
12. "Orion Town 3"
13. "Adirondack Amish Holler"
14. "The Deep-Yard Dream"

== Personnel ==
Frontier Ruckus

- Matthew Milia - lead vocals, guitar, harmonica, pedal steel guitar, piano, chord organ
- David Winston Jones - banjo, voice, ebow
- Eli Eisman - bass
- Ryan "Smalls" Etzcorn - drum kit, all percussions, mallet-saw, chain-rattle, stomping
- Zachary Nichols - trumpet, singing-saw, melodica, mallet-saw
- Anna Burch - voice, harmonium, piano

Guest Musicians

- Ryan Hay - piano on tracks 3, 6, 8
- Jim Roll - fiddle on track 4

== Production ==
- Produced by Frontier Ruckus
- Engineered and Mixed by Jim Roll
- Mastered by Roger Seibel
- Artwork and Design by Matthew Milia and Brian Peters
- Recorded and Mixed at Backseat Productions in Ann Arbor, Michigan during the winter and spring of early 2008
