= Frontier Ruckus =

American band

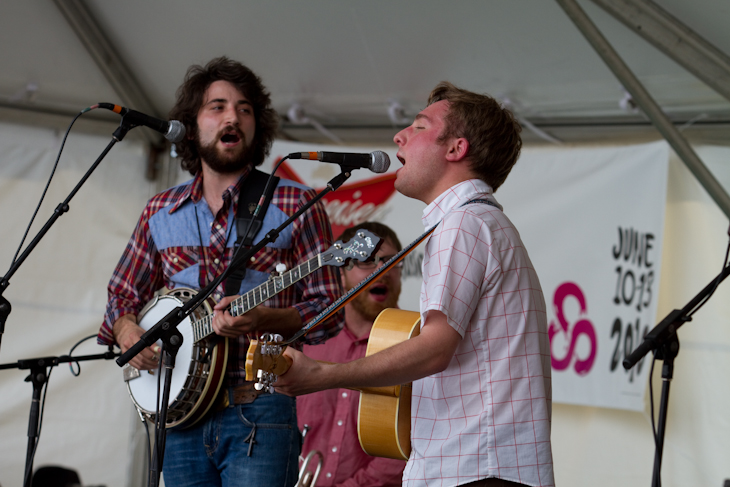
- Frontier Ruckus performing at the 2010 Bonnaroo Music Festival

Background information
- Origin: Metro Detroit, Michigan
- Genres: Folk, folk rock, bluegrass, alt-country, Americana, jangle pop
- Years active: 2003-Present
- Labels: Quite Scientific Records, Loose Music (Europe), Ramseur Records
- Members: Matthew Milia; David Jones; Zachary Nichols
- Past members: Anna Burch; Ryan Etzcorn; Eli Eisman
- Website: Official website

Frontier Ruckus is an American band from Michigan. The project is centered on the lyrically intensive songs of Matthew Milia, and was formed by Milia and banjo player David Winston Jones while growing up in Metro Detroit. In 2008, the band released its debut full-length record, The Orion Songbook. Though formed in a folk tradition, Frontier Ruckus has shown an eclecticism across their catalog, incorporating aspects of baroque and jangle pop, alt-country, bluegrass, and lo-fi.

== Biography ==
Milia and Jones formed the band while both attending Brother Rice High School in Metro Detroit. They began by playing a mixture of Milia's early compositions and traditional bluegrass songs that Jones had collected. Around this time they also recruited Eli Eisman as a bassist. While Milia attended Michigan State University—where he studied poetry under Diane Wakoski—and Jones attended the University of Michigan, Frontier Ruckus expanded into a six-piece. The new formation included Zachary Nichols playing trumpet, musical saw, and melodica; Ryan Etzcorn playing drums; and Anna Burch singing harmony vocals—all of whom Milia met while in East Lansing.

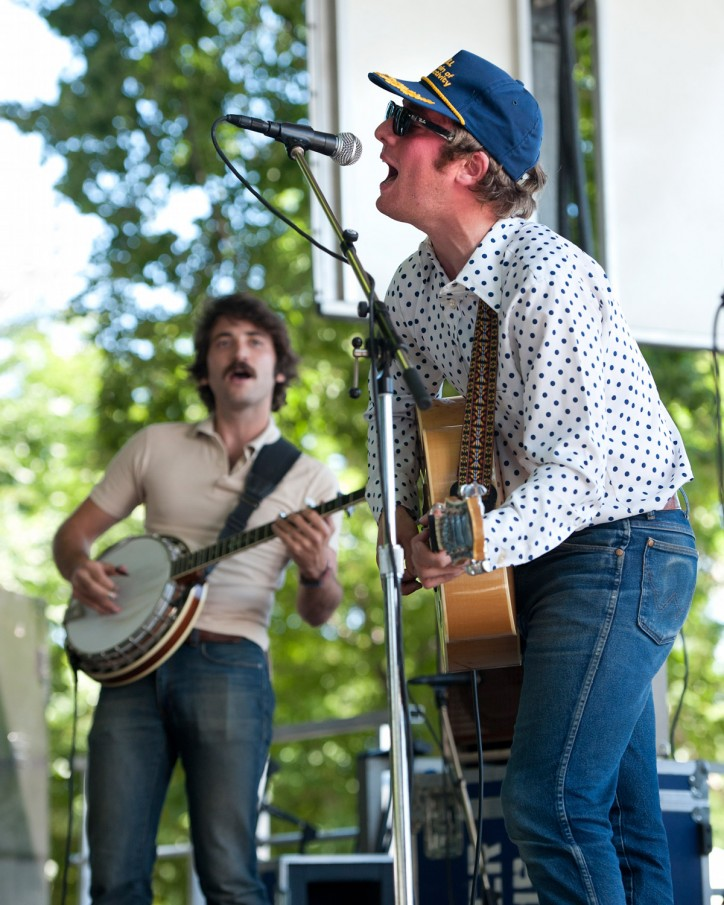
Frontier Ruckus performing at Lollapalooza in 2013

In the beginning of 2007, shortly after the release of I Am The Water You Are Pumping, Frontier Ruckus began to receive attention in Michigan, with Metro Times considering the band "already one of the very best sounds to come out of Michigan this entire decade," and Real Detroit Weekly stating: "This is the best band you haven't heard and Milia is the most impressive wordsmith I've listened to in a really long time. I'm not sure If I can recall a voice as untreated and honest as Milia's ... ever. His is a voice whose timbre carries as much meaning as the words that come through it."

Frontier Ruckus was named "Best Folk Group" in Detroit by Real Detroit Weekly, who were also among the first to laud The Orion Songbook prior to the album's official release, during an eMusic advance feature.

Released on November 6, 2008 through Quite Scientific Records, The Orion Songbook received positive reviews, garnering attention from Blurt Magazine, Crawdaddy!, and Under the Radar, who gave the album an 8/10. Hear/Say called it "the year's best alt-country album."

In 2009, Way Upstate and the Crippled Summer, pt. 1, a six-song EP, was released as the fourth side of the double-vinyl edition of The Orion Songbook. Frontier Ruckus toured the entire US and to Europe for the first time, playing Slottsfjell Festival in Norway, among shows in the UK, Germany, and Holland.

In 2010 the band toured extensively, including a month-long European tour and a performance at Bonnaroo Music Festival, for which Rolling Stone listed the band as one of their Essential Sets, calling the band "the perfect recipe for Gothic Americana." Paste Magazine featured Frontier Ruckus in their "Best of What's Next" issue. It was announced that Deadmalls and Nightfalls, their second full-length album, would be released July 20 via Ramseur Records. Versions of several new songs were released through a Daytrotter session on February 14, 2010.

Deadmalls and Nightfalls received positive critical reviews—given 9 out of 10 stars by PopMatters, who called the record "a musical map to the psyches of its performers" that "not only outdoes it predecessor, it reaches a level of top-notch songwriting most groups never attain on a greatest hits compilation." A music video was shot for the song "Nerves of the Nightmind" which featured members of the band in downtown Los Angeles. Deadmalls and Nightfalls served to broaden public appreciation for the group's songcraft and instrumentation, as it also left an impression with songwriters of note. Upon hearing the album, musician Ryan Adams posted on his Twitter page: "Loving the new Frontier Ruckus! Great band ... this is what I want to get back to. Those tunes go forever ...."

Frontier Ruckus returned to Europe in May 2011 for the third time, expanding to new countries such as Ireland, Sweden, and Italy. Their performance at the 2011 Kilkenny Rhythm and Roots festival was described as "a particular highlight" by The Irish Times.

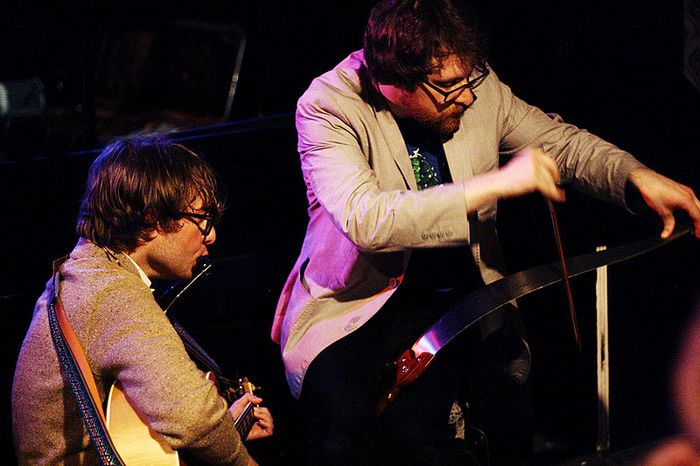
Zachary Nichols playing the musical saw on tour with Frontier Ruckus in Stockholm, Sweden in 2011

The band taped a performance for the NPR radio program Mountain Stage in August 2011 alongside John Oates of Hall and Oates, performing with him for the encore number.

Adult Swim used Frontier Ruckus' song "Dark Autumn Hour" for four ads in their well-known series of bumps, first airing in September 2011. Around this time, Deadmalls and Nightfalls was released in a deluxe double-vinyl package including the bonus EP Way Upstate and the Crippled Summer, pt. 2.

In March 2012, the band streamed the recording of their third Daytrotter session live. A music film shot on Super 8 mm film for the song "Mona and Emmy" was premiered by Paste Magazine who also announced the first official details on the band's upcoming third full-length record Eternity of Dimming—slated to be a double album of 20 songs and 5,500 words.

In May 2012, footage of Jones and Nichols performing a medley of theme songs from The Legend of Zelda—on banjo and musical saw, melodica, and Casio keyboard respectively—was circulated by Geekologie and the Kotaku site of Gawker Media.

Eternity of Dimming was released on January 29, 2013 to strong critical response. Jim Farber of the New York Daily News commended the double album's dense specificity and ability to "obsess on the most suburban images possible." The band released Eternity of Dimming at the 36th Ann Arbor Folk Festival at Hill Auditorium, sharing the stage with Colin Hay and Rodriguez.

2013 saw Frontier Ruckus perform at Lollapalooza and return to Europe twice, as Eternity was their first record to receive distribution from a European label, Loose Music. The band appeared at End of the Road Festival in the UK, where the record received positive reviews from Uncut magazine—who stated the band was at "their blinding best." Singles for the record, "Careening Catalog Immemorial" and "Dealerships", were both accompanied by music videos and premiered by IFC and Rolling Stone, respectively.

For The A.V. Club's "Undercover" series, Frontier Ruckus recorded a cover of Third Eye Blind's 1990s alternative rock hit "Semi-Charmed Life" at The Onion's Chicago office.

On November 11, 2014 (November 10, 2014 in Europe), Frontier Ruckus released their fourth full-length album, Sitcom Afterlife. Prior to the complete album release, the tracks "Sad Modernity", "Bathroom Stall Hypnosis", and "Darling Anonymity" were released individually, highlighting the band's shift toward a greater focus on classic power pop arrangements, while still remaining densely lyrical. On the release tour for Sitcom Afterlife, CMJ reviewed the band's Manhattan stop glowingly, writing: "For an hour, they treated the crowd to a sampling of songs taken from their three existing LPs as well as their upcoming fourth, and transported us from New York City to a larger, intangible, folktale version of suburban America."

In December 2016, Rolling Stone announced that Frontier Ruckus' 5th LP would be titled Enter the Kingdom and was to be released in February 2017. It was reported that the album was recorded in Nashville with founding Wilco member and final Uncle Tupelo drummer, Ken Coomer. They also premiered a music video for the single "27 Dollars," featuring the band performing on the roof of the Penobscot Building in downtown Detroit. For the first half of 2017, the band toured across much of the United States and Europe in support of Enter the Kingdom. A music video for the album's title track was premiered by Billboard in late summer. Writing for Vice, legendary rock critic Robert Christgau gave the album a favorable review, commenting, "Somebody marry this winsome sad sack, whose increasingly plausible rhymes now include open-ibuprofen, gauche-precocious-neurosis, salad on the tennis court-valid passport, speckled melanin-freckled up your skin, and the very sexy errands-gerunds."

In February 2024, Frontier Ruckus ended a seven-year recording hiatus to release their sixth full-length studio album, On the Northline.

== Discography ==
=== Studio albums ===
- The Orion Songbook (2008)
- Deadmalls and Nightfalls (2010)
- Eternity of Dimming (2013)
- Sitcom Afterlife (2014)
- Enter the Kingdom (2017)
- On the Northline (2024)

=== EPs ===
- I Am the Water You Are Pumping EP (2006)
- Way Upstate and the Crippled Summer, pt. 1 (2009)
- Way Upstate and the Crippled Summer, pt. 2 (2011)
