= Third Precinct Police Station =

Third precinct police station may refer to:

- Third precinct police station (Detroit) that was formerly on Hunt Street
- Third precinct police station (Minneapolis) that burned down on May 28, 2020 during riots
