= Matthew Milia =

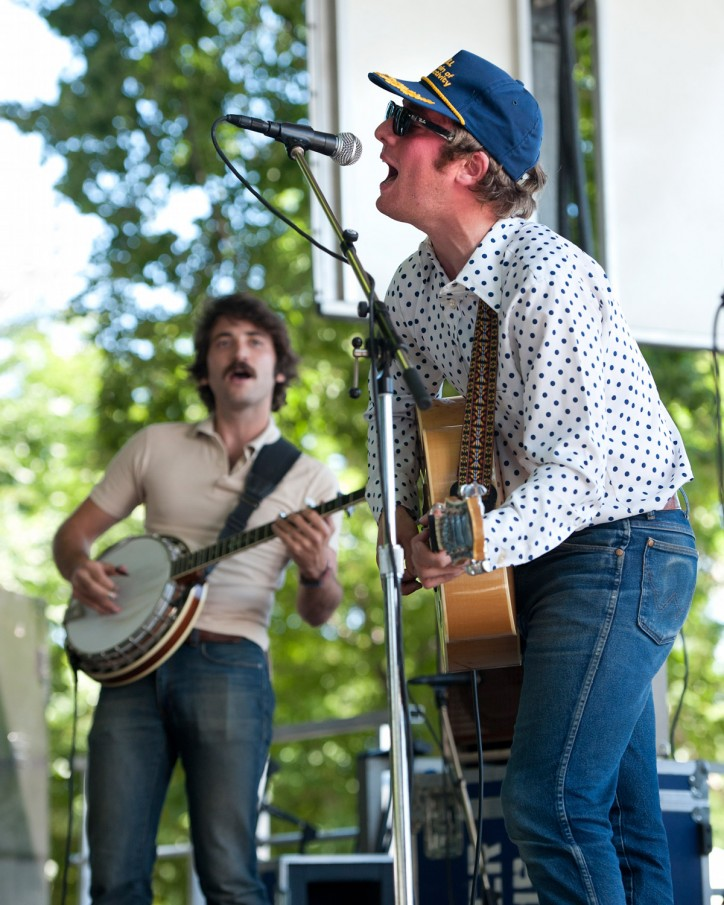
- Milia performing at Lollapalooza in 2013

Background information
- Born: November 6, 1985 (age 41); Royal Oak, Michigan, United States
- Genre: Folk rock
- Occupations: Songwriter, musician, poet
- Instruments: Vocals, guitar, pedal steel guitar, harmonica, piano
- Years active: 2005–present
- Labels: Quite Scientific Records, Ramseur Records, Loose Music
- Website: Official site, Frontier Ruckus site

Matthew Milia (born November 6, 1985) is an American songwriter, musician, poet, and visual artist. He is best known as the leader of the band Frontier Ruckus.

== Early life ==
Milia was raised in West Bloomfield, Michigan, where he attended Catholic school for 13 years. While in high school at Brother Rice he met David Jones, with whom he formed Frontier Ruckus. He then studied Creative Writing at Michigan State University, where he was mentored by poet Diane Wakoski. At Michigan State, Milia met bandmates Zachary Nichols, Anna Burch, and Ryan Etzcorn. In 2007, he and Burch studied at the Irish Writers Centre in Dublin.

== Frontier Ruckus ==
As an undergraduate at Michigan State, Milia began writing the songs that would become The Orion Songbook, Frontier Ruckus' 2008 debut. Allmusic hailed the album as being "about as good a debut as a band can hope for" and Milia's lyrics as "hypnotic." In 2009 Milia was contacted by The Avett Brothers' manager Dolphus Ramseur, with whom Frontier Ruckus subsequently signed for both management and label representation. Frontier Ruckus began heavily touring the United States at this time.

Deadmalls and Nightfalls, Frontier Ruckus' 2nd LP, was released in 2010 to critical acclaim. PopMatters wrote that it "not only outdoes its predecessor, it reaches a level of top-notch songwriting most groups never attain on a greatest hits compilation." The band performed at Bonnaroo that year, with Rolling Stone listing the band as one of the festival's "Essential Sets" due in part to Milia's "haunting voice." At this point Frontier Ruckus began touring Europe regularly as well.

In 2013 Frontier Ruckus' 3rd LP, a sprawling double-album of 20 songs titled Eternity of Dimming, was released. The apex of Milia's obsessive nostalgia and verbose lyricism, the record received significant critical attention. CMJ wrote that the album "veritably overflows with images of middle-class American youth in the 1990s." Frontier Ruckus performed at Lollapalooza that summer and at the UK's End of the Road Festival that fall in support of the release. The band released a follow-up soon thereafter with 2014's Sitcom Afterlife, which detailed a breakup in Milia's life with "lyrics as dense as a Faulkner novel," according to Paste Magazine.

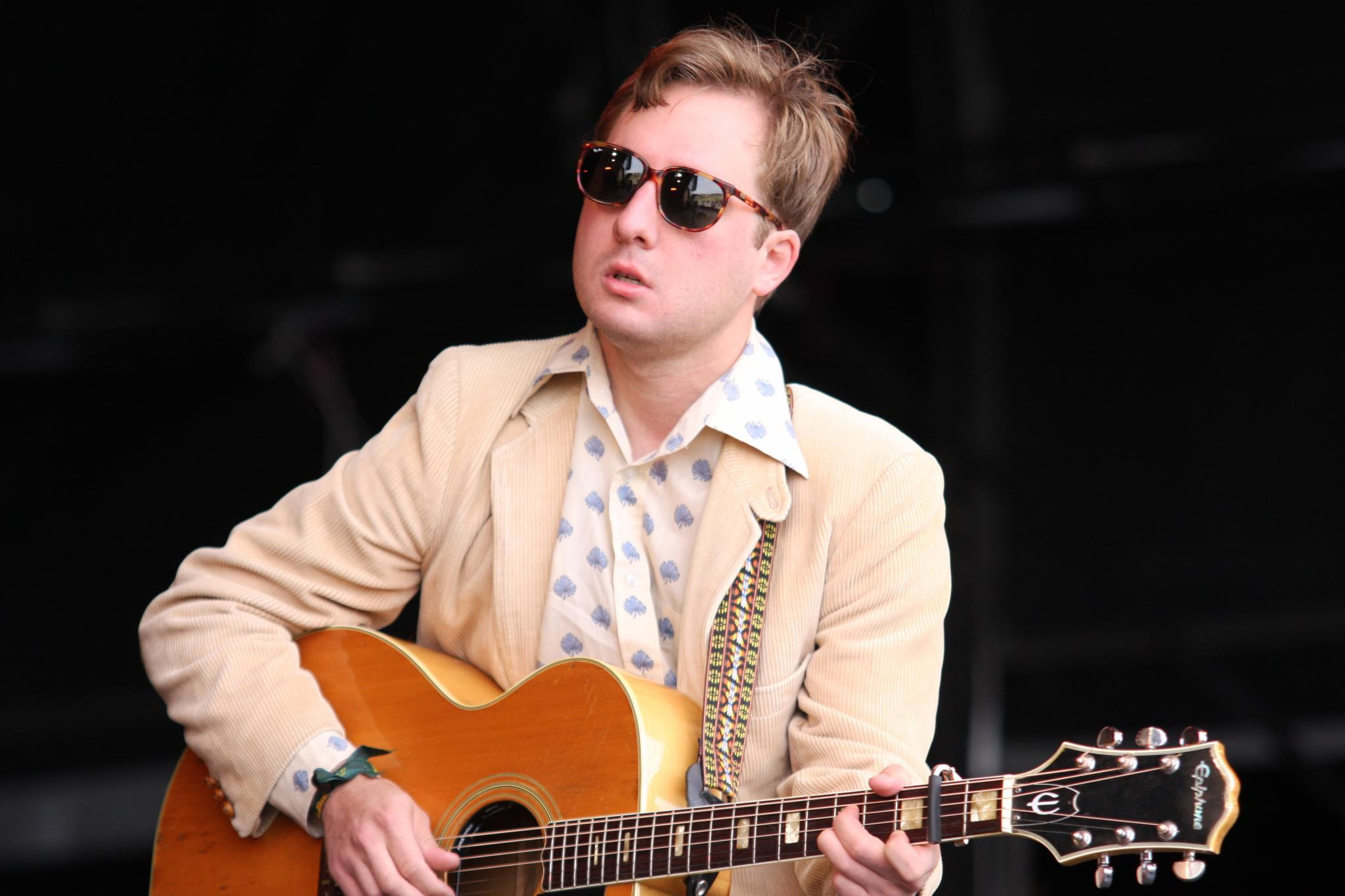
Milia performing at End of the Road Festival in the UK with Frontier Ruckus in 2013

In the summer of 2015, Milia and Frontier Ruckus recorded their 5th LP Enter the Kingdom in Nashville with Ken Coomer, founding member of Wilco and final drummer for Uncle Tupelo. Coomer co-produced and played drums on the album. In December 2016, Milia spoke with Rolling Stone, who announced the album was due out in February 2017 and premiered a music video for the single "27 Dollars." In July 2017, Milia spoke with Billboard about taking time off from touring to work on a new Frontier Ruckus album, his upcoming solo album, and the music video for "Enter the Kingdom", which premiered on their site.

In a positive review of Enter the Kingdom for Noisey, legendary rock critic Robert Christgau wrote of Milia: "Somebody marry this winsome sad sack, whose increasingly plausible rhymes now include open-ibuprofen, gauche-precocious-neurosis, salad on the tennis court-valid passport, speckled melanin-freckled up your skin, and the very sexy errands-gerunds."

Fellow songwriters such as Ryan Adams have been vocal fans of Milia's work, with Adams tweeting: "...this is what I want to get back to. Those tunes go forever..." Lady Lamb listed Frontier Ruckus as one of her favorite bands in an interview with NPR's Tom Ashbrook.

Milia sang a duet with Samantha Crain on her song "Santa Fe", also appearing in the music video shot in Santa Fe directed by Sterlin Harjo.

As a pedal steel guitarist, Milia has performed or recorded with Cotton Jones, Anna Burch, Bonny Doon, Ohtis, Chris Bathgate, and others.

Milia lives in Detroit where he regularly produces poetry and visual art, typically released directly to fans over the internet.

In 2015, Milia's Detroit home which he shared with bandmate Anna Burch was featured on the interior design website Apartment Therapy.

== Alone at St. Hugo ==
Matthew Milia released his debut solo studio album, Alone at St. Hugo on May 3, 2019. Recorded on a Tascam 388 reel-to-reel tape recorder, the entire album was performed by Milia and engineer Ben Collins in Ypsilanti, Michigan from 2016-2018. In an interview with Metro Times, Milia described the set of highly melodic power pop songs that constitute the album as a result of shirking music industry expectations and remaining prolific as a writer for purer reasons, saying, "It's the writing part that I still wake up every day and want to do."

Thematically, the album deals with concepts of aging and memory—as does much of Milia's songwriting. The title references the Catholic grade school Milia attended in Bloomfield Hills, Michigan. WDET commented that "Milia’s lyrics come from an immersive vantage and sea-like memory, an all at once haunting yet comforting nostalgia." Speaking on-air with them, Milia elaborated:

St. Hugo was the Catholic school I attended for 9 years—as Frontier Ruckus is a building I’ve been in for 10 years. I like to write about spaces that I’ve inhabited for a long time, like Metro Detroit, which has been the building of my life for my entire lifespan. Chronicling how those places change over time, and how age kind of confuses and how all these eras of experience blur together—kind of like how the municipalities and townships of Metro Detroit blur together. There’s kind of a classroom motif that goes through the album, hence the title. I think the title occurred to me originally because I was fantasizing about communicating with my 5th-grade self in the computer lab after-school in latchkey waiting for my mom to pick me up—like if I could talk to myself through the early modem, my adult self talking to my 5th-grade self, the things I would say and how I would translate my experience and vice versa.

BrooklynVegan called the album "a gorgeous dose of indie folk," as it features lush layers of vocal harmony accompanied by mellotron, trumpet, cello, mandolin, Hammond organ, and pedal steel guitar.

Tascam, the makers of the vintage recording gear on which the album was recorded, issued a statement about the album from the company's social media, saying, "We're big fans of Detroit artist Matthew Milia...this is some gorgeous music!" Big Star, one of Matthew Milia's biggest stated influences, also enthusiastically acknowledged the fact that Milia wore a Big Star t-shirt in the album cover photomontage.

== Discography ==
Frontier Ruckus

- I Am the Water You Are Pumping (2006) (EP)
- The Orion Songbook (2008)
- Way Upstate and the Crippled Summer, pt. 1 (2009) (EP)
- Deadmalls and Nightfalls (2010)
- Way Upstate and the Crippled Summer, pt. 2 (2011) (EP)
- Eternity of Dimming (2013)
- Sitcom Afterlife (2014)
- Enter the Kingdom (2017)
- On the Northline (2024)

Solo

- Even Fuckboys Get the Blues (2015) (mixtape)
- Alone at St. Hugo (2019)
- Keego Harbor (2021)

== Poetry ==
Year	Title	Press	Format
2015	Intruders Laugh Wickedly	Sitcom Universe	Chapbook
2014	Divvy the Dregs	Sitcom Universe	Digital
