= If You're Dreaming =

Studio album by Anna Burch
- Released: April 3, 2020
- Length: 38:17
- Label: Polyvinyl
- Producer: Sam Evian

Anna Burch chronology
Quit the Curse (2018)	If You're Dreaming (2020)

Professional ratings
Aggregate scores
Source	Rating
Metacritic	74/100
Review scores
Source	Rating
AllMusic	3.5/5 stars
Exclaim!	8/10
Pitchfork	7.2/10
PopMatters	7/10

If You're Dreaming is the second studio album by American musician Anna Burch. It was released on April 3, 2020 under Polyvinyl Record Co.

== Critical reception ==
If You're Dreaming was met with "generally favorable" reviews from critics. At Metacritic, which assigns a weighted average rating out of 100 to reviews from mainstream publications, this release received an average score of 74, based on 12 reviews. Aggregator Album of the Year gave the release a 75 out of 100 based on a critical consensus of 17 reviews.

Aimee Cliff from Pitchfork said of the album: "The Detroit singer-songwriter’s second album is sparser, lonelier, and more patient, allowing the candor of her lyrics to shine through."

== Track listing ==
If You're Dreaming track listing
No.	Title	Length
1.	"Can't Sleep"	4:36
2.	"Party's Over"	2:42
3.	"Jacket"	3:36
4.	"So I Can See"	3:22
5.	"Ask Me To"	3:24
6.	"Keep It Warm"	1:40
7.	"Go It Alone"	3:18
8.	"Tell Me What's True"	3:48
9.	"Not So Bad"	3:15
10.	"Picture Show"	1:07
11.	"Every Feeling"	4:27
12.	"Here With You"	2:56
Total length:		38:17

== Personnel ==
Musicians

- Anna Burch – Primary Artist

Production

- Sam Evian – Producer
