= Enter the Kingdom =

Studio album by Frontier Ruckus
- Released: February 17, 2017
- Genres: Folk rock, Indie pop
- Language: English
- Labels: Sitcom Universe, Loose Music (Europe)

Frontier Ruckus chronology
Sitcom Afterlife (2014)	Enter the Kingdom (2017)	On the Northline (2024)

Professional ratings
Review scores
Source	Rating
Aesthetica	(favorable)
AllMusic	4/5 stars
American Songwriter	3/5 stars
Daily Express	4/5 stars
Glide	8/10 stars
Mojo	3/5 stars
Morning Star	4/5 stars
NARC Magazine	5/5 stars
Uncut	6/10 stars
Vice (Robert Christgau)	(3-star Honorable Mention)

Enter the Kingdom is the fifth full-length studio album by Frontier Ruckus. Recorded in Nashville, Tennessee with former Wilco and Uncle Tupelo drummer Ken Coomer, it marked the first Frontier Ruckus album produced outside of the band's home state of Michigan. Rolling Stone announced the album in late 2016 and premiered a music video for the debut single "27 Dollars."

== Reception ==
With a more deliberate and polished production, Enter the Kingdom was met by a critical response ranging from laudatory to mixed. Thematically, the record was described in an interview with the Detroit Free Press as addressing economic hardship in songwriter Matthew Milia's immediate family and the disillusionment of childhood. These heavy lyrical elements were juxtaposed with frequent power pop song structures and the lush string arrangements of Zachary Nichols. British art magazine Aesthetica saw the album as "a swaying invitation into the suburban American household, offering a dreamy glance back into a past forgotten life." Much notice was given to the precision of Milia's rhyme schemes, with legendary rock critic Robert Christgau commenting, "Somebody marry this winsome sad sack, whose increasingly plausible rhymes now include open-ibuprofen, gauche-precocious-neurosis, salad on the tennis court-valid passport, speckled melanin-freckled up your skin, and the very sexy errands-gerunds." Mojo went on to say, "Well-educated, literary-inclined American songwriters are hardly thin on the ground, but Frontier Ruckus' Matthew Milia's poetic inclination always sets him apart.”

Paste released the upbeat single "Positively Freaking," showcasing the understated and melodic accompaniment of founding banjoist David Jones. Some fans of the rawer, more unhinged Americana from the band's earlier albums expressed disappointment in the new direction—including Uncut, who had championed the band's 2013 double-album Eternity of Dimming. Contrarily, AllMusic commended Ken Coomer's production and commented, "There's a warmth and personality in these performances that's honest and winning...and if this batch of songs sounds a bit more artful than much of Frontier Ruckus' back catalog, "If You Can" is beautiful and striking in its simplicity, with just a guitar, Milia's voice, and the sound of rainfall bringing an evocative depth to the tune." They went on to call Frontier Ruckus one of the best things to come out of Michigan since Faygo Redpop.

Vocalist Anna Burch joined Milia for an interview with NPR's Michigan Radio detailing her signature role in the band's sound since their debut album. A video for "Our Flowers Are Still Burning" featured Burch prominently, waking in the morning following the aftermath of a party. For the subsequent European and American release tours in support of Enter the Kingdom, Burch had officially returned to being the band's permanent bass player as well.

In July 2017, Milia spoke with Billboard about taking time off from touring to work on a new Frontier Ruckus album, his upcoming solo album, and the music video for "Enter the Kingdom", which premiered on their site.

== Track listing ==
All songs written by Matthew Milia, except "Since Milford" by Zachary Nichols

1. "Visit Me"
2. "Gerunds"
3. "27 Dollars"
4. "Our Flowers Are Still Burning"
5. "Positively Freaking"
6. "Sarah Springtime"
7. "Since Milford"
8. "Gauche"
9. "Nothing Is Working"
10. "If You Can"
11. "Enter the Kingdom"

== Personnel ==
Frontier Ruckus

- Matthew Milia – lead vocals, acoustic guitar, electric guitar, 12-string guitar, baritone guitar, pedal steel guitar, piano, Lowrey organ
- David Winston Jones – banjo, banjo-Telecaster
- Zachary Nichols – trumpet, singing-saw, melodica, alto horn, piano, keyboards, Optigan
- Anna Burch – vocals

Guest musicians

- Ken Coomer – drums, percussion
- Connor Dodson – bass guitar
- Kristin Weber – violin
- Austin Hoke – cello

Production

- Produced by Frontier Ruckus and Ken Coomer
- Engineered by Patrick Miller
- Mixed by Ken Coomer, Patrick Miller, and Frontier Ruckus
- Mastered by Eric Conn at Independent Mastering
- Layout and Design by Frontier Ruckus and Julia Grant
- Cover concept by Matthew Milia, photographed by David Jones
- Recorded and mixed at Cartoon Moon in Nashville, Tennessee summer of 2015
