= Keego Harbor (album) =

Studio album by Matthew Milia
- Released: July 16, 2021
- Length: 50:49
- Label: Sitcom Universe
- Producer: Matthew Milia; Ben Collins

Matthew Milia chronology
Alone at St. Hugo (2019)	Keego Harbor (2021)

Keego Harbor is the second solo studio album by Matthew Milia, released on July 16, 2021, through Sitcom Universe. It was named after the Michigan town near where Milia grew up. Recorded in a similar fashion to Milia's debut solo album Alone at St. Hugo, it was once again produced in the Ypsilanti home studio of Ben Collins to a Tascam 388 reel-to-reel tape recorder. The album cover features Milia and his wife, Lauren, standing in front of Sylvan Lake—with Keego Harbor and Waterford in the background.

== Critical reception ==
Giving the album four stars, the United Kingdom's Morning Star claimed: "Milia is one of the great American songwriters working today... delightful, bittersweet stuff."

Describing Milia as "the poet laureate of disillusioned suburban romantics", the Columbia Tribune wrote that "the songwriter beautifully, bleakly documents the people, places and casual ruin that comprise our image of home—holding out the flickering light of solidarity as he keeps vigil for what used to be." They continued: "Keego Harbor" features the most realized arrangements of Milia's solo career, a subtly-layered folk-rock sound that casts him as a Harry Nilsson figure for the indie generation. The album is both a wonderful entry point into Milia's songwriting, and a soulful next step for listeners keeping stride all along."

Speaking on Milia's literary tone of voice and Keego Harbor's emotional themes, Hour Detroit wrote: "That voice has always been unapologetically rooted in Detroit’s suburbs, referencing things like I-75, the Franklin Cider Mill, and northbound Lions traffic (to the Silverdome) in his lyrics. Though most people consider these outlying areas—with their strip malls and fast food corridors—blandly interchangeable, Milia mines their poetic complexity."

A live session and interview for Acoustic Café aired in March of 2022, during which host Rob Reinhart commented on the album's poignant depiction of suburban decay and bittersweet indictment of the American dream: "It's interesting that your songs kind of capture them for ever in this particular state of decline. Like eventually, the actual place is going to go away, somebody's going to knock it down and build up a new thing. These [songs] stand as witness—you're bearing witness to the state of decay."

A music video for the title track was shot in Keego Harbor and surrounding areas such as Pontiac, directed by Noah Elliott Morrison. Metro Times described the video as a "beautifully bleak tour" of the songwriter's hometown.

== Track listing ==
All songs written by Matthew Milia

1. "Salad Bars" – 6:40
2. "Sunburnt Landscapers" – 4:09
3. "Condo Lakeshore" – 6:05
4. "Me and My Sweetheart" – 6:12
5. "With the Taste of Metal on Its Tongue" – 3:39
6. "Autumn America" – 4:36
7. "Haven't Heard You Laugh in a Long Time" – 4:19
8. "Inherited Cars" – 5:09
9. "Home Improvement" – 4:57
10. "Keego Harbor" – 5:03

== Personnel ==
Musicians

- Matthew Milia – lead and harmony vocals, acoustic and electric guitar, 12-string guitar, bass guitar, harmonica, mellotron, Fender Rhodes, Hammond organ
- Ben Collins – drums, harmony vocals, bass guitar, electric guitar, 12-string guitar, tambourine, shaker, jingle bells, glockenspiel, Hammond organ, electric piano, Farfisa
- Lauren Milia – harmony vocals
- Pete Ballard – pedal steel guitar
- Ryan Hay – piano

Production

- Produced by Matthew Milia and Ben Collins
- Engineered and recorded by Ben Collins
- Mixed by Matthew Milia and Ben Collins
- Mastered by Jeff Lipton and Maria Rice at Peerless Mastering
- Photography by John Mark Hanson
