= Alone at St. Hugo =

Studio album by Matthew Milia
- Released: May 3, 2019
- Genre: Folk rock; power pop; bedroom pop
- Language: English
- Label: Sitcom Universe
- Producer: Matthew Milia; Ben Collins

Matthew Milia chronology
Even Fuckboys Get the Blues (2015)	Alone at St. Hugo (2019)	Keego Harbor (2021)

Alone at St. Hugo is the debut solo studio album by Matthew Milia. It was released on May 3, 2019. Recorded on a Tascam 388 reel-to-reel tape recorder, the entire album was performed by Milia and engineer Ben Collins. In an interview with Metro Times, Milia described the set of highly melodic power pop songs that constitute the album as a result of shirking music industry expectations and remaining prolific as a writer for purer reasons, saying, "It's the writing part that I still wake up every day and want to do."

== Lyrical content ==
Thematically, the album deals with concepts of aging and memory—as does much of Milia's songwriting. The title references the Catholic grade school Milia attended in Bloomfield Hills, Michigan. WDET commented that "Milia’s lyrics come from an immersive vantage and sea-like memory, an all at once haunting yet comforting nostalgia." Speaking on-air with them, Milia elaborated:

St. Hugo was the Catholic school I attended for 9 years—as Frontier Ruckus is a building I’ve been in for 10 years. I like to write about spaces that I’ve inhabited for a long time, like Metro Detroit, which has been the building of my life for my entire lifespan. Chronicling how those places change over time, and how age kind of confuses and how all these eras of experience blur together—kind of like how the municipalities and townships of Metro Detroit blur together. There’s kind of a classroom motif that goes through the album, hence the title. I think the title occurred to me originally because I was fantasizing about communicating with my 5th-grade self in the computer lab after-school in latchkey waiting for my mom to pick me up—like if I could talk to myself through the early modem, my adult self talking to my 5th-grade self, the things I would say and how I would translate my experience and vice versa.

== Reception ==
BrooklynVegan called the album "a gorgeous dose of indie folk," as it features lush layers of vocal harmony accompanied by mellotron, trumpet, cello, mandolin, Hammond organ, and pedal steel guitar. Ghettoblaster Magazine wrote, "His soaring harmonies and impeccable chord changes on these fresh tunes will likely satisfy fans of both Big Star and Gram Parsons." Metro Times premiered a music video for "Congratulations Honey"—featuring Milia playing pedal steel guitar in a bowling alley while his mother bowled, and other Metro Detroit landmarks, such as the Silverdome just prior to demolition. They wrote that with the song, "Milia captures the essence of suburban mundanity and nostalgic glory." Speaking about the record as a whole, Metro Times later wrote: "Alone at St. Hugo reads as a yearbook of Milia’s lifetimes, each one pieced together with glue and popsicle sticks, and the emotional remnants of nearly 10 years of loneliness as a touring artist and an ongoing fascination with the intricacies of familial closeness."

Tascam, the makers of the vintage recording gear on which the album was recorded, issued a statement about the album from the company's social media, saying, "We're big fans of Detroit artist Matthew Milia...this is some gorgeous music!" Big Star, one of Milia's biggest stated influences, also enthusiastically acknowledged the fact that Milia wore a Big Star t-shirt in the album cover's photomontage.

Commending the album's lyrical tone, Italian music site Ondarock wrote, "If the reference imagery of Matthew's music is, as his fans well-know, that of the sitcom, Alone At St. Hugo is the perfect manifesto, in his rare ability to tell something of life and of himself lightly." They continued, "By now we can say that we are faced with an artist who, despite his relative anonymity, has left a significant and recognizable mark on the contemporary American culture."

Finnish music site One Chord To Another was emphatic in its praise for the album: "I will be shocked if something else will be my album of the year when we reach the end of the year. I just love everything about this...Why isn’t everyone singing and shouting the praises of Alone at St. Hugo from the rooftops? A dazzlingly brilliant album."

== Track listing ==
All songs written by Matthew Milia

1. "Alive at the Same Time"
2. "Puncture"
3. "Congratulations Honey"
4. "Sometimes I Feel Like My Arm's Falling Off"
5. "Attention Students"
6. "Swollen Home"
7. "Schemer"
8. "Abruptly Old and Caffeinated"
9. "Why Is It?"
10. "Karen's Just a Kid"

== Personnel ==
- Matthew Milia - lead vocals, backing vocals, acoustic & electric guitars, bass guitar, pedal steel guitar, 12-string guitar, mandolin, mellotron, organ, piano
- Ben Collins - drums, backing vocals, bass guitar, trumpet, electric guitar, tambourine, shaker, Hammond organ, synths, piano, cello

== Production ==
- Produced by Matthew Milia and Ben Collins
- Engineered and recorded by Ben Collins
- Mixed by Matthew Milia and Ben Collins
- Mastered by Jeff Lipton and Maria Rice at Peerless Mastering
- Artwork and Design by Matthew Milia
- Recorded and Mixed in Ypsilanti, Michigan from 2016-2018
