= Way Upstate and the Crippled Summer, pt. 1 =

EP by Frontier Ruckus
- Released: June 20, 2009
- Genre: Folk rock
- Language: English
- Label: Lower Peninsula Records

Frontier Ruckus chronology
| The Orion Songbook (2008) | Way Upstate and the Crippled Summer, pt. 1 (2009) | Deadmalls and Nightfalls (2010) |

Way Upstate and the Crippled Summer, pt. 1 is an EP by Frontier Ruckus, released in 2009 between the releases of The Orion Songbook and Deadmalls & Nightfalls. It is only available on the double-vinyl edition of the former.

== Track listing ==
All songs were written by Matthew Milia

1. "One-Story-Carport-Houses"
2. "The Great Laketown"
3. "Ann Arbortown"
4. "Mohawk, New York"
5. "Driving Home, Christmas Eve"
6. "Abigail"

== Personnel ==
Frontier Ruckus

- Matthew Milia – lead vocals, guitar, pedal steel guitar
- David Winston Jones – banjo, dobro, voice
- Ryan "Smalls" Etzcorn – drum kit, all percussion, background vocals
- Zachary Nichols – trumpet, singing-saw, melodica
- Anna Burch – voice

Guest Musicians

- Ryan Hay – piano on track 1, background vocals on track 1
- John Krohn – bass guitar on track 1, background vocals on track 1
- Angelica Tovar – background vocals on track 1

== Production ==
- Produced by Frontier Ruckus
- Engineered by John Krohn
- Assistant engineer on track 1 was Ian Walker
- Mastered by Glenn Brown
- Artwork and Design by Matthew Milia
- Recorded and Mixed at Deep Deep Pink in Lansing, Michigan during the summer of 2007 and winter of 2008–2009
