= Way Upstate and the Crippled Summer, pt. 2 =

EP by Frontier Ruckus
- Released: November 1, 2011
- Genre: Folk rock
- Language: English
- Label: Ramseur Records, Lower Peninsula Records

Frontier Ruckus chronology
Deadmalls and Nightfalls (2010)	Way Upstate and the Crippled Summer, pt. 2 (2011)	Eternity of Dimming (2013)

Way Upstate and the Crippled Summer, pt. 2 is an EP by Frontier Ruckus, released in 2011 between the releases of Deadmalls & Nightfalls and Eternity of Dimming. It is only physically available on the double-vinyl edition of the former. The EP is the release by Frontier Ruckus most in the category of alternative country.

== Track listing ==
All songs written by Matthew Milia

1. "Mona and Emmy"
2. "Winter and the Preacher's Daughter"
3. "Weeds and Life Among Them"
4. "Ogallala"
5. "Epiphanies and Revelations"

== Personnel ==
Frontier Ruckus

- Matthew Milia – lead vocals, guitar, pedal steel guitar, harmonica
- David Winston Jones – banjo, voice
- Ryan "Smalls" Etzcorn – drum kit, all percussion
- Zachary Nichols – trumpet, singing-saw, melodica, alto horn, euphonium
- Anna Burch – voice

Guest Musicians

- Ryan Hay – piano, Hammond organ
- John Krohn – bass guitar on tracks 1, 2, 4
- Brian Barnes – bass on track 5

== Production ==
- Produced by Frontier Ruckus
- Engineered and mixed by Jim Roll
- Mastered by Jim Roll and John Krohn
- Artwork and Design by Matthew Milia and Richard Maisano
- Recorded and Mixed at Backseat Productions in Ann Arbor, Michigan mostly in April 2009, finished in early 2011
