= Sitcom Afterlife =

Studio album by Frontier Ruckus
- Released: November 11, 2014
- Genres: Folk rock, indie pop
- Language: English
- Label: Quite Scientific Records

Frontier Ruckus chronology
Eternity of Dimming (2013)	Sitcom Afterlife (2014)	Enter the Kingdom (2017)

Professional ratings
Review scores
Source	Rating
AllMusic	4/5 stars
Paste Magazine	8.4/10 stars
Examiner	4/5 stars
Tiny Mix Tapes	3.5/5 marks
CMJ	(favorable)

Sitcom Afterlife is the fourth full-length studio album by Frontier Ruckus. Strongly embracing elements of classic power pop, the record marked a stylistic shift for the band while still retaining a folk rock undercurrent. The album marked the return of harmony vocalist Anna Burch, and indefinite departure of founding drummer Ryan Etzcorn. Sitcom Afterlife is considered to be the result of a romantic breakup experienced by songwriter Matthew Milia, to which AllMusic commented: "[Milia's] not having much luck with relationships, which may be bad news for him but has certainly given him plenty of inspiration."

== Reception ==
Sitcom Afterlife received mostly favorable reviews. PopMatters debuted "Bathroom Stall Hypnosis" in August, 2014, noting the "energetic instrumentation" as a "catchy and clever masquerade for the album’s reflective and deep lyrical material." CMJ premiered "Darling Anonymity" in September, 2014, saying that song "takes the sound fans grew accustomed to on 2013’s expansive double-LP Eternity of Dimming and throws it into turbo, resulting in a beautiful sugar rush of a folk pop number."

Regarding the album as a whole, Paste Magazine commended "lyrics as dense as a Faulkner novel and intricate arrangements that transform the typical Americana twang and faded pastoral preconceptions of folk/pop into something surreal and yet familiar." No Depression praised the album's dynamic range, stating that "Milia tells these stories...with powerful vocals which tremble under the weight of expression, moving through a number of experiences and observations, at times involved and profound, at other times brilliantly effective in their simplicity." Tiny Mix Tapes felt the album failed to match "the world-creating power and self-actualized sound" of previous album Eternity of Dimming, but that "'Crabapples In The Centuries Storm' is as intense and as anxious as any song Milia has written, and 'Down In The Morning We Thought We’d Never Lose' houses a romanticism both self-aware and earnest"—adding that, "as ever, Frontier Ruckus deserves more attention than they’re getting." AllMusic also commended "Crabapples in the Century's Storm"—stating that it alone "is packed with more detail than most writers can cram into a full album." They went on to praise the album as an encapsulation of "twenty-something life as the romanticism of youth gives way to the trickier realities of adulthood" through an "eclectic musical approach without losing touch with the qualities that made their previous work so strong." Much of the album's eclectic nature derived from banjo player David Jones' implementation of a customized banjo-Telecaster hybrid instrument which afforded a more jangly, cleaner electric sound than acoustic banjo. Zachary Nichols' ample usage of synthesizers and electronic drum beats programmed into vintage organs also influenced a departure in sound.

Time Out New York praised the album's graphic lyrical approach, in which "the boy next door comes unhinged" throughout songs "acrid with schadenfreude for the exes who stayed and stagnated...coked-up calls from bathroom stalls, the drunken wedding of a onetime enemy...gall and piss, battery acid and gasoline—not to mention Arizona Iced Tea."

== Interviews ==
In an interview with PopMatters, Matthew Milia described the emotional catalyst behind the album, saying:

"I wrote most of the songs on Sitcom Afterlife after a particularly weird and unceremonious breakup. The majority of the Frontier Ruckus catalog had dealt with a longstanding romantic situation that was much more complex—a bittersweet dissolution marked by shapeshifting guilt and confused but always tender love. This new situation was the opposite. Unambiguous, a bit disgraceful, and not altogether free of some pettiness on both sides. I was certainly very pissed at the time, and afforded some vitriol that allowed me to write a little differently than usual.”

== Music videos ==
A music video for "The Splendid World" was directed by John Hanson—featuring one uninterrupted slow motion tracking shot for the video's duration.

A graphic holiday-themed video for "Bathroom Stall Hypnosis" was shot on VHS by directors Weston Getto Allen and Dorian Electra.

A Cheers-themed music video for "Sad Modernity" was released over a year after the release of the album, featuring the band walking in and out of the actual exterior of the television show's Boston location and footage from the show projected across the band members sitting on a couch.

== Track listing ==
All songs written by Matthew Milia, except "Counterfeits" by Zachary Nichols

1. "The Splendid World"
2. "Bathroom Stall Hypnosis"
3. "Sad Modernity"
4. "Very Well"
5. "Crabapples in the Century's Storm"
6. "Darling Anonymity"
7. "Down in the Morning We Thought We'd Never Lose"
8. "Little Henrietta"
9. "Counterfeits"
10. "A&W Orange and Brown"

== Personnel ==
Frontier Ruckus

- Matthew Milia – lead vocals, acoustic guitar, electric guitar, 12-string guitar, harmonica, bass guitar, pedal steel guitar, piano, Moog synthesizer
- David Winston Jones – banjo, banjo-Telecaster, vocals, bass guitar
- Zachary Nichols – trumpet, singing-saw, melodica, alto horn, Hammond organ, keyboards
- Anna Burch – Vocals
- Ryan "Smalls" Etzcorn – drums

Guest Musicians

- Fred Thomas – drums on 7, 8, 10

== Production ==
- Produced by Frontier Ruckus
- Engineered and recorded by Chris Koltay
- Mixed by Frontier Ruckus and Chris Koltay
- Mastered by Heba Kadry at Timeless Mastering
- Layout and Design by Matthew Milia, assisted by Brian Peters
- Cover concept by Matthew Milia, photographed by David Jones and Zachary Nichols
- Recorded and Mixed at High Bias Recordings in Detroit, Michigan late 2013-early 2014
