= Third Precinct Police Station (Detroit) =

- U.S. National Register of Historic Places
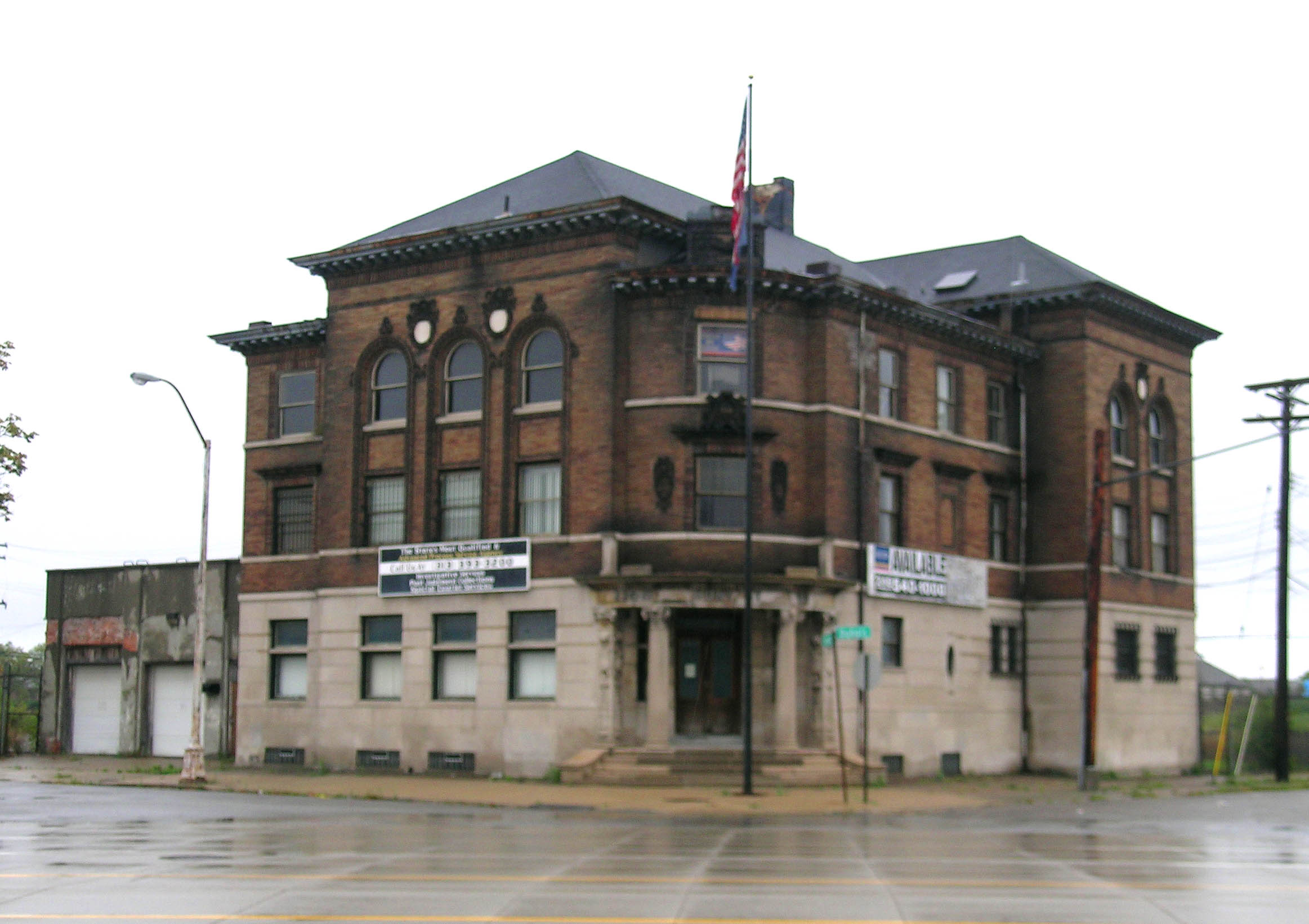

- Location within Michigan
- Interactive map
- Location: 2200 Hunt Street; Detroit, Michigan
- Coordinates: 42°21′2″N 83°1′58″W
- Built: 1896
- Architect: Edward C. Van Leyen
- Architectural style: Beaux-Arts
- NRHP reference No.: 80001928
- Added to NRHP: February 29, 1980

The Third Precinct Police Station (or Hunt Street Station) is a former police station located at 2200 Hunt Street (at Gratiot Avenue) in Detroit, Michigan. The building was listed on the National Register of Historic Places in 1980. It now holds a co-working space, known as "Hunt Street Station."

== Description ==
The Third Precinct Police Station is a three-story structure built from yellow brick and limestone. It is essentially boxy, but the exterior is constructed of projecting and receding planes that disguise the fact. The entrance, located in a curved corner bay, is flanked by limestone columns and pilasters with carvings of a police shield and the faces of policemen. The second and third floor windows facing Hunt and Dubois are unified by arched guilloche-patterned, terra-cotta enframements. Third-floor windows are topped by arched hoods. The projecting cornice is metal, fabricated by the Detroit Cornice and Slate Company.

== Significance ==
The Hunt Street Police Station is a well-preserved example of a late 19th-century Beaux-Arts public building, and is significant for its role in the history of the Detroit police force. The building was designed by architect Edward Van Leyen, who also designed the Belle Isle Casino. Completed in May 1897, the building served as the Detroit Metropolitan Police Department Third Precinct for 63 years. The Third Precinct Police Station was home to the nation's first police training academy, opened in 1911. In 1959, the Third and Seventh Precincts were consolidated and the building was sold; subsequently used as an office space, the structure was left empty in 2004 and was for sale in 2013. In early 2017, the building was sold and a historical renovation was completed. In 2018, the station was re-opened as a coworking space.
