= Quit the Curse =

Studio album by Anna Burch
- Released: February 2, 2018
- Length: 32:54
- Label: Polyvinyl

Anna Burch chronology
Quit the Curse (2018)	If You’re Dreaming (2020)

Professional ratings
Aggregate scores
Source	Rating
Metacritic	75/100
Review scores
Source	Rating
AllMusic	4/5 stars
Exclaim!	7/10
Dork	3/5 stars
Loud and Quiet	8/10
Pitchfork	6.8/10
PopMatters	7/10

Quit the Curse is the debut studio album by American musician Anna Burch. It was released on February 2, 2018 under Polyvinyl Record Co.

== Critical reception ==
Quit the Curse was met with "generally favorable" reviews from critics. At Metacritic, which assigns a weighted average rating out of 100 to reviews from mainstream publications, this release received an average score of 75, based on 10 reviews Aggregator Album of the Year gave the release a 73 out of 100 based on a critical consensus of 12 reviews.

Erin Bashford from Dork said of the album: "the record plays with folk and country alongside its indie rock roots. Anna has polished her brand of soft, saccharine, harmonic indie rock, and with that, presents these nine songs as a modern tale of cities and people. [The album] is a cogently written record, characterised by its barbed lyrics and dreamy instrumental." Susan Darlington from Loud and Quiet said: "Smart without giving the impression of trying too hard, Burch’s debut is full of subtle ear-worms and a lyrical intimacy that makes her the girl you want to hang out with at college."

=== Accolades ===
Accolades for Quit the Curse
Publication	Accolade	Rank
ABC News	ABC News Top 50 Albums of 2018	38
Under the Radar	Under the Radar's Top 100 Albums of 2018	94

== Track listing ==
Quit the Curse track listing
No.	Title	Length
1.	"2 Cool 2 Care"	3:49
2.	"Tea-Soaked Letter"	3:40
3.	"Asking 4 a Friend"	3:53
4.	"Quit the Curse"	2:53
5.	"Belle Isle"	3:37
6.	"In Your Dreams"	3:28
7.	"What I Want"	4:21
8.	"Yeah You Know"	2:57
9.	"With You Every Day"	4:16

== Personnel ==
Musicians

- Anna Burch – lead vocals, guitar
- Paul Cherry – bass, guitar
- Ryan Clancy – drums
- Adam Pressley – bass
- Matt Rickle – drums
- Steve Kentala – drums
- Matthew Milia – pedal steel
- Ben Collins – guitar

Production

- Collin Dupuis – engineer, mixer
- Adam Gill – engineer
- Andy Milad – engineer
- Noah Elliott Morrison – photographer
- Heba Kadry – mastering
