= Detroit Cornice and Slate Company Building =

- U.S. National Register of Historic Places
- Michigan State Historic Site
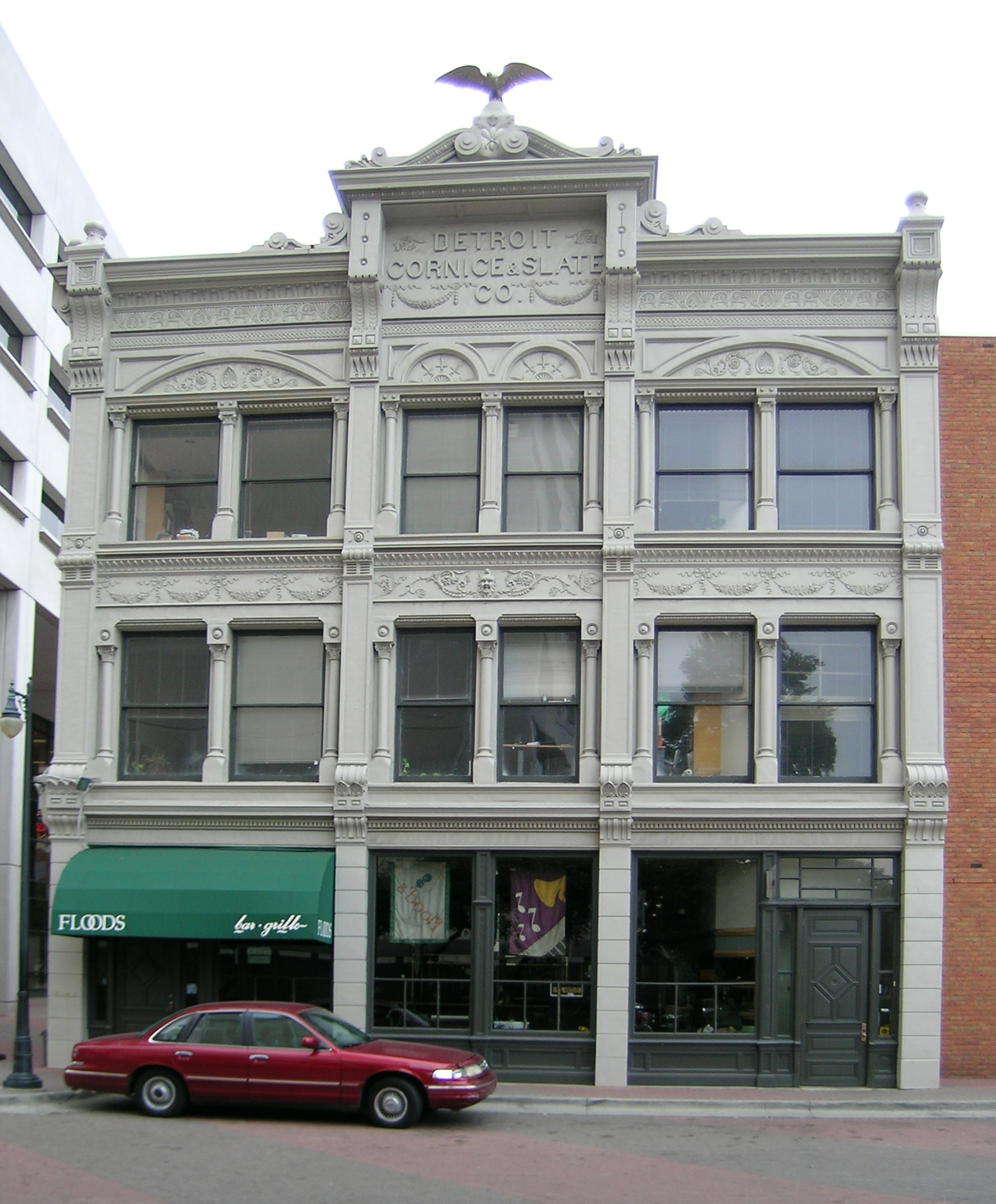
- Interactive map
- Location: 733 St. Antoine Street; Detroit, Michigan
- Coordinates: 42°20′4″N 83°2′26″W
- Built: 1897
- Architect: Harry J. Rill
- Architectural style: Beaux-Arts
- NRHP reference No.: 74001000

Significant dates
- Added to NRHP: December 16, 1974
- Designated MSHS: January 21, 1974

The Detroit Cornice and Slate Company Building is a Beaux-Arts style industrial office building located at 733 St. Antoine Street (at East Lafayette Street) in Downtown Detroit, Michigan. It was listed on the National Register of Historic Places and designated a Michigan State Historic Site in 1974.

== History ==
The Detroit Cornice and Slate Company was started by Frank Hesse in 1888. In 1897, the company hired Harry J. Rill to design a Beaux-Arts three-story building for their use. The building was used by the company until 1972, when lack of storage and parking space forced the company to relocate in Ferndale. In 1974, the building was renovated for office and commercial use by architect Bill Kessler. In the 1990s, the Metro Times newspaper moved into the building; a wraparound addition was constructed to increase room for the newspaper. In 1999 William Kessler and Associates restored and made an addition to the building.

In July 2013 Blue Cross Blue Shield of Michigan was finalizing the purchase of the Cornice and Slate Company Building, which had the Metro Times and Paxahau, an event production and management company that produces the Movement Electronic Music Festival. The Cornice and Slate building is adjacent to the BCBS Bricktown customer service facility. The acquisition of the Cornice and Slate building would add additional space to BCBS's Greektown facility. The ground floor lease to the Flood's Bar & Grille would be maintained while the Cornice and Slate second and third floors would be used as office space for about 100 BCBS employees. This means that the other tenants would be expected to move out of the building. Helen Stojic, director of corporate communications for BCBS, did not state the sale price of the building. BCBS was expected to close on the purchase in August 2013.

By July 16, 2013 Chris Sexson of the Metro Times stated that the publication had not yet made definitive plans for its new headquarters but was already looking for a new headquarters location. The acquisition forced the Metro Times to move. The newspaper leased space in a facility in Ferndale, Michigan.

== Construction ==
The facade of this building is constructed from finely crafted galvanized steel. These metal facades permitted elegant ornamentation to be constructed quickly and cheaply, particularly in locations like Detroit where stone was not easily obtainable. The Detroit Cornice and Slate Company itself fashioned many of the building's simulated carvings from sheet metal.
