= Eternity of Dimming =

Studio album by Frontier Ruckus
- Released: January 29, 2013
- Genre: Folk rock
- Language: English
- Labels: Quite Scientific Records, Loose Music

Frontier Ruckus chronology
Way Upstate and the Crippled Summer, pt. 2 (2011)	Eternity of Dimming (2013)	Sitcom Afterlife (2014)

Professional ratings
Review scores
Source	Rating
Uncut	8/10 stars
American Songwriter	4/5 stars
AllMusic	4/5 stars
Mojo	3/5 stars
New York Daily News	(favorable)

Eternity of Dimming is the third full-length studio album by Frontier Ruckus. A double album of 20 songs, the record is nearly an hour and a half in duration. The album's lyrical text is also unusually prolific, containing approximately 5,600 words. Despite the dense and hardly immediate nature of the record, Eternity of Dimming received mostly favorable reviews—eliciting reactions of both hyperbolic praise and occasional vexation. Thematically, the record details childhood and adolescent memory within the suburban landscape of Metro Detroit.

== Reception ==
AllMusic saw the album as "wonderfully unified, with a ghostly, flickering soundscape playing out behind Milia's sad but still reaffirming singing." Paste Magazine similarly added that "Frontier Ruckus has continued to evoke rich imagery and heartfelt emotion with the storied lyrics of vocalist Matthew Milia." Rob Reinhardt of Acoustic Café called the album "a quantum leap from the previous two [albums]."

CMJ would later write that the album "veritably overflows with images of middle-class American youth in the 1990s," by way of "treating junk drawers, garage sales, mini-van floors and the parking lot behind the 7-Eleven like hallowed ground...retreading the lines that bleed when the darkness of adulthood infringes upon the brightness of childhood...an exhaustive culmination of everything the band had been aiming for up until that point."

Being the first record with which Frontier Ruckus had signed with British label Loose Music, the release marked the band's first exposure to European press outlets. In an interview with Uncut in the UK, Matthew Milia described the lyrical landscapes throughout the album as "specific and personal...twisted and exaggerated," yet with each line containing "a truth that I've implanted." Rob Huges of Uncut claimed the band to be "at their blinding best on 'In Protection of Sylvan Manor' and 'Junk-Drawer Sorrow'"—giving the record a score of 8/10.

Mojo was positive yet more dubious about the record, stating: "Unbalanced and unrelenting, it's a fascinating album, if difficult to enjoy."

Paste Magazine released "Careening Catalog Immemorial" as the album's debut single in November 2012 accompanied by the "90s Carpool Version" b-side. "Eyelashes" was chosen as the lead-off single in Europe, however, and debuted in October 2012 via British blog "The Line of Best Fit."

Rolling Stone premiered "Dealerships" as a follow-up single on January 11, 2013. Paste Magazine and AOL Spinner both streamed the record in its entirety a week prior to its release.

The song "If the Suns Collapse" was premiered individually by The A.V. Club.

== Music videos ==
IFC premiered the first music video off of Eternity of Dimming—shot by David Meiklejohn in Portland, Maine for "Careening Catalog Immemorial." The video features a group of high school boys who abandon a white limousine en route to their prom, instead to fraternize in each other's shirtless company—playing Nintendo and other games while consuming ice cream and soda pop.

A music video for "Dealerships" was shot in and around Matthew Milia's childhood home, self-directed by the band and John Hanson and shot on both 16 mm film and video. A video for "Black Holes" was also premiered by Paste Magazine and directed by Christine Hucal, featuring camcorder VHS home footage from the childhoods of the band and director interspersed with current footage.

== Interviews ==
In defense of the album's expansiveness, Milia told Jim Farber of the New York Daily News: "You could say our new album is the work of a very indulgent artist...We didn't give ourselves any restraints as a band and I didn't give myself any rules as a writer. I've always been a verbose writer. I think of it as a style more than a fault. While there's something to be said for verbal economy, I'm trying to say as much as I can." In regards to Eternity of Dimming being stigmatized as a "double album," Stereo Subversion wrote: "It's rare that a double-album emerges that is brilliance start to finish, with no filler to be found. Frontier Ruckus' Eternity of Dimming is one of those rare gems."

In explanation of the comprehensive catalog of brand names and chain corporations mentioned throughout the album, Milia told Chicago Magazine: "I simply try to chronicle, with obsessive detail, the world I was born into, which happens to be suburban; [a world] marked by these redundant corporate outposts and ubiquitous landscape. I am a product and extension of it, and I love it and celebrate it."

Milia described Eternity's sonic nature to Italian publication Ondarock as "going for a sort of shimmery melodic tone that not only pays pastiche to the 90s radio pop that truly informs a lot of my melodic sensibility and is referenced on the record, but also the early guitar pop of the 70s like Big Star or ELO which is really important to me as well." He also added: "Zach had free license to get as weird as he wanted—so we brought in many organs and obsolete keyboards plugged in through rickety ancient amplifiers."

== Track listing ==
All songs written by Matthew Milia

1. "Eyelashes"
2. "Black Holes"
3. "Thermostat"
4. "Birthday Girl"
5. "Junk-Drawer Sorrow"
6. "The Black-Ice World"
7. "I Buried You So Deep"
8. "Granduncles of St. Lawrence County"
9. "Bike Trail"
10. "I Met Rebecca"
11. "Eternity of Dimming"
12. "If the Suns Collapse"
13. "Nightmares of Space"
14. "Surgery"
15. "If the Summer"
16. "In Protection of Sylvan Manor"
17. "Dealerships"
18. "Funeral Family Flowers"
19. "Open It Up"
20. "Careening Catalog Immemorial"

== Personnel ==
Frontier Ruckus

- Matthew Milia – lead vocals, acoustic guitar, electric guitar, harmonica, bass guitar, pedal steel guitar, piano, chord organ, Lowrey organ, Wurlitzer organ
- David Winston Jones – banjo, vocals, dobro, ebow, Lowrey organ, tubular bells, bass guitar
- Zachary Nichols – trumpet, singing-saw, melodica, alto horn, chord organ, Lowrey organ, Wurlitzer organ, tubular bells, camera flash, bass guitar, vocals
- Ryan "Smalls" Etzcorn – drum kit, all percussions, vocals

Guest Musicians

- Anna Burch – harmony vocals
- John Hanson – bass guitar
- Brian Barnes – bass guitar
- Michael Nau – backing vocals and counter melodies
- Jim Roll – bass guitar
- Brennan Andes – bass guitar, double bass
- Aaron Apsey – viola

== Production ==
- Produced by Frontier Ruckus
- Engineered and recorded by Jim Roll
- Mixed by Frontier Ruckus and Jim Roll
- Mastered by Glenn Brown
- Artwork and Design by Matthew Milia, assisted by Richard Maisano and Brian Peters
- Cover concept assembled by Matthew Milia and photographed by Zachary Nichols and David Jones
- Recorded and Mixed at Backseat Productions in Ann Arbor, Michigan November 2011 – March 2012

Tracks 16 & 20 recorded in Matthew Milia's bedroom String arrangements on 13 & 19 by Zachary Nichols Banjo cadenza on track 19 composed by David W. Jones
