= The Thirteenth Anniversary Show =

Live album by The Residents
- Released: 1986

The Thirteenth Anniversary tour was a triumph both financially and critically for the Residents. It was also the last time Snakefinger would work with them, as he died of a heart attack in 1987. The official album release of The Thirteenth Anniversary Show in 1986 was a recording of the show in Japan. There was also a recording of the show in the United States that was released to UWEB fan club members in the late 1980s, and various outtakes and bootlegs of other performances of the show exist as well.

The track list below is for the cassette edition, as this was also the track list used for the ESD reissue in the late 1990s.

== Track listing ==
1. "Jailhouse Rock"
2. "Where Is She"
3. "Picnic in the Jungle"
4. "Passing the Bottle*"
5. "Monkey and Bunny"
6. "Theme from an American TV Show**"
7. "It's a Man's Man's Man's World"
8. "Smelly Tongues"
9. "Eloise"
10. "Ships a Going Down*"
11. "Tourniquet of Roses*"
12. "Easter Woman"
13. "Amber"
14. "Red Rider"
15. "Die in Terror"
16. "Coming of the Crow"
17. "Eva's Warning"
18. "Cry for the Fire"
- These songs included on the cassette version only upon release in 1986.
  - Track included, but not listed, on LP or cassette.

== Track Listing for 1999/2000 CD Re-Release ==
1. Lizard Lady
2. Semolina
3. Hello Skinny/Constantinople
4. Jailhouse Rock
5. Where Is She?
6. Picnic in the Jungle
7. Smelly Tongues
8. Eloise
9. Ship's a Goin' Down
10. The New Machine
11. Tourniquet of Roses
12. Passing the Bottle
13. Monkey and Bunny
14. Theme from an American TV Show
15. Man's World
16. Walter Westinghouse
17. Easter Woman
18. Amber
19. Red Rider
20. Die in Terror
21. The Coming of the Crow/Eva's Warning
22. Cry for the Fire

== Notes ==
The original album was released on Wave Records in Japan with longer versions of the songs and the tracks included on the U.S. cassette release. It also had a different name: The Eyeball Show.

The album was released on Bomba Records in Japan in 1999 as The 13th Anniversary Show, Live in Tokyo. This version was released on East Side Digital in the United States in 2000.
