= REVUE Mid Michigan =

Magazine

REVUE Mid-Michigan
- Type: Entertainment monthly
- Format: Tabloid
- Owner: REVUE Holding Company
- Publisher: Brian Edwards
- Founded: October 2009
- Ceased publication: 2012
- Language: English
- Headquarters: Lansing, Michigan
- Circulation: 15,000
- Website: www.revuemm.com

REVUE Mid-Michigan was a monthly entertainment and arts magazine that covered Lansing and other Mid-Michigan cities.

== Coverage ==
REVUE Mid-Michigan, owned by REVUE Holding Company, published 15,000 copies once a month and was distributed in 300 locations. The magazine, which targeted the 18- to 45-year-old market, covered Lansing and its surrounding areas, though it also covered Western Livingston County. Each issue was also published online every month at its official site.

== About ==
The magazine began publishing in October 2009, however the company's REVUE West-Michigan edition was in Grand Rapids for over 20 years. In early December 2011 REVUE Mid-Michigan moved its headquarters to The Neo Center building in Lansing, Michigan.

REVUE Mid-Michigan covered local music, touring acts, dining, and annual festivals such as Common Ground Music Festival. Other fixtures in the magazine included feature stories on local film, theater, art, and the "Lit Life" page which covers authors and book-signing events.

On September 21, 2011, REVUE Holding Company also acquired MiBiz, a regional business magazine covering West Michigan.

In 2012 REVUE Mid-Michigan ceased operations. The West Michigan REVUE continued.
