= Geekologie =

Technology news website

- Website type: Blog
- Available in: English
- Owner: Anticlown Media Network
- Website: www.geekologie.com
- Commercial: Yes
- Registration: None
- Launched: April 2, 2006; 20 years ago
- Current status: Shut down

Geekologie was a popular blog originally dedicated to reviewing gadgets and technology. Geekologie was founded on April 2, 2006, and the first post appeared on April 4, 2006. On October 22, 2012, Time recognized Geekologie as one of the "25 Best Blogs of 2012".

== Overview ==
Geekologie was updated multiple times a day with articles on gadgets, video games, consumer electronics and popular culture related to games and movies. Gmail, Google's webmail service, as well as many other RSS readers, has included Geekologie as a default RSS feed, pulling the latest articles which appear at the top of all user's mailboxes.

== Recognition ==
In March 2008, Geekologie was featured on G4TV's Attack of the Show. It has also been nominated for "Best Computer or Technology Weblog" from Weblogs, Inc. in 2008 where it competed with Gizmodo, Lifehacker, and Engadget.

== Shutdown ==
In April 2022, the website went inactive, save for a black main page with the message "Geekologie has shut down. Thank you to everybody. Now go be happy."

== The "Awesome" ==
Besides articles and commentary on gadgets and electronics, Geekologie often features articles on the "awesome", which generally include items that are unordinary like the Bacon Explosion a bacon and sausage roll consisting of two pounds of sausage and bacon, rolled into a cylinder and baked. Another 'awesome' article featured is the 1,474 megapixel photo of President Obama's Inauguration.
