= Anna Burch =

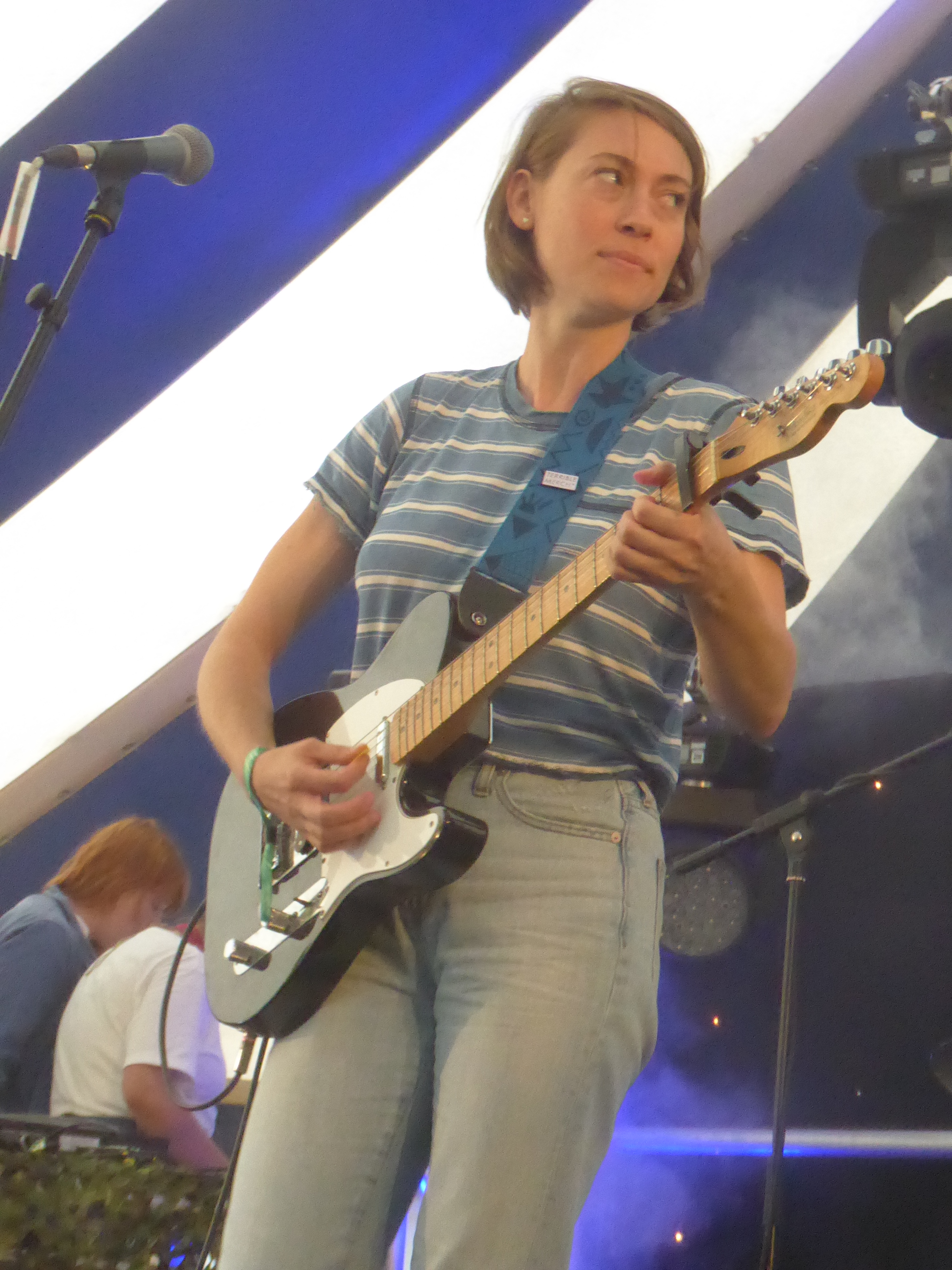
- Burch at the 2018 Port Eliot Festival

Background information
- Origin: Detroit, Michigan
- Genres: Indie pop, indie rock
- Instruments: Vocals, guitar
- Years active: 2014–2022
- Labels: Polyvinyl, Heavenly Recordings
- Website: annaburchmusic.com

Anna Burch (/ɑːnə/) is an American singer-songwriter from Detroit, Michigan.

== Career ==
Burch spent her early years as a touring musician as part of Frontier Ruckus, until she decided to take a break from music to attend grad school in Chicago. Her musical hiatus ended in 2014 when she moved back to Detroit and continued singing in Frontier Ruckus while beginning to co-front Failed Flowers. While participating in these groups, Burch wrote songs and recorded phone demos, her first solo release being a split single with Stef Chura. With the encouragement and help of friend and Chicago musician Paul Cherry, her demos eventually turned into the full band recordings of her debut album.

Burch signed to Polyvinyl Records in 2017 after PV artist Fred Thomas, formerly of Saturday Looks Good To Me, sent demos to the label with the note "This is not a drill. You need to hear this." Burch released singles "2 Cool to Care," "Asking 4 a Friend," "Tea Soaked Letter," and finally "Quit the Curse," which premiered on Noisey days before her debut full-length, Quit the Curse, was released on February 2, 2018. Following the album's release, Burch shared a music video for "With You Every Day," which premiered on The Fader.

In April 2020, Burch released her second album, If You're Dreaming. Spring North American and summer European tours were announced in support of the album, but were postponed to spring 2021 and fall 2020 respectively due to the ongoing COVID-19 pandemic.

== Musical style ==
Pitchfork has described Anna Burch as an artist who "cuts with her folk-rock past and turns to 1960s-indebted indie pop and 1990s-schooled alt-rock hooks." As she told Billboard, Burch cites Elliott Smith and Alvvays as major influences for Quit the Curse.

== Discography ==
Studio Albums

- Quit the Curse (2018)
- If You’re Dreaming (2020)

Singles

- "2 Cool 2 Care" (2017)
- "Asking 4 a Friend" (2017)
- "Not So Bad" (2020)
- "Party's Over" (2020)
