= Chord organ =

Electronic organ

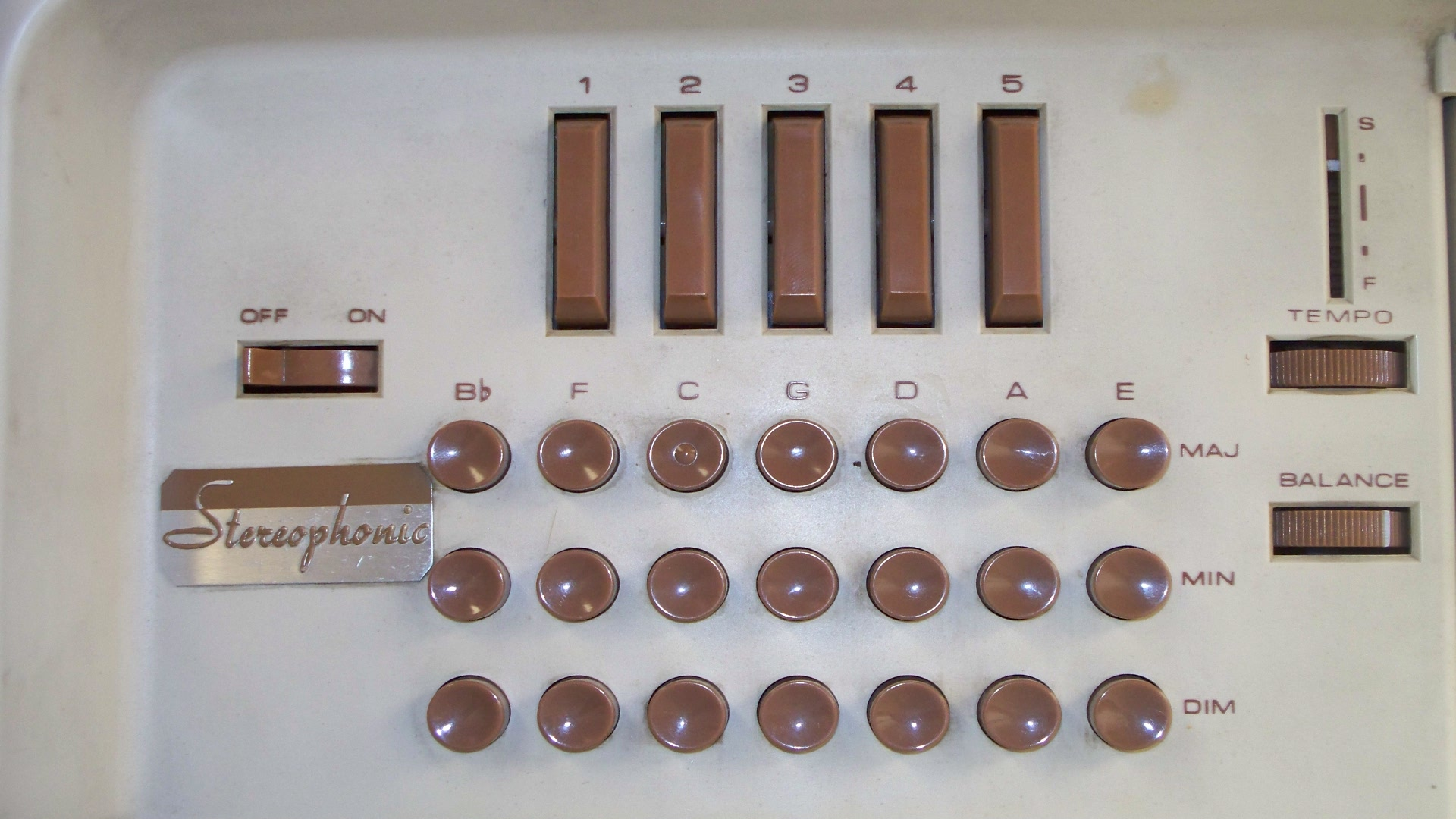
Chord buttons on the chord organ (Optigan)

Chord organ is a kind of home organ that has a single short keyboard and a set of chord buttons, enabling the musician to play a melody or lead with one hand and accompanying chords with the other, like the accordion with a set of chord buttons which was originated from a patent by Cyrill Demian in 1829, etc.

Initially, the chord organ was invented as a kind of electronic home organ by Laurens Hammond in 1950. This was followed by the reed chord organ (c. 1959) and Optigan (c. 1971). The sound of the reed chord organ is somewhat similar to the harmonium or the accordion.

== History ==
The Chord Organ was first introduced by the Hammond Organ Company in 1950. It was invented primarily by John M. Hanert, who was Hammond's primary musical engineer at the time. He had previously developed the Novachord and Solovox, two instruments which used vacuum-tube circuitry rather than tone or phonic wheels to generate the tones as in a Hammond Organ.

The Chord Organ, as the name implies, used a left-hand panel with buttons to play harmony; however, instead of a Stradella-type chord and bass arrangement, a completely new design was implemented. 96 separate chord buttons provided Major, Minor, 7th, Diminished, Augmented, Major 6th, Minor 7th and 9th chords for all 12 musical keys. Two bass pedals, played by the left foot, sounded the "root" and "fifth" of each chord, and rhythm was added by means of a bar struck by either the palm or the thumb of the left hand.

The Chord Organ incorporated elements of both the Novachord and the Solovox in that the right-hand 37-note keyboard could play both chords and single notes. An "Organ" section provided String and Flute sounds which were polyphonic, while a "Solo" division permitted the organist to play single-note melodies superimposed over the polyphonic "Organ" division. The Solo division operated essentially identically to the Solovox - one group of controls determined the register or pitch in which the Solo division would sound while another group of controls allowed the player to filter the sound in various ways ("timbre" controls).

There were five different versions of the basic Chord Organ, which was called the "S" series. The original model "S" used octal tubes and one 12" speaker while the "S-1" used miniature tubes and one 12" speaker. For the "S-4," two 10" speakers were substituted for the single 12" speaker and the wood cabinet was re-designed. The "S-6," the most popular model, added the ability to add Percussion to the Solo division, thereby allowing the instrument to imitate instruments such as Banjo, Hawaiian Guitar, etc. The "S-100," the last revision of the "S" series, added built-in Stereo Reverberation, substituted an Expression Pedal for the expression lever used on previous models, and featured a re-styled cabinet design as well as a separate ON/OFF Power Switch (on previous models, power was turned on by swinging the expression lever down similar to the Solovox).

An additional Chord Organ was manufactured for a brief time in the mid-'60s (the 2000 series), which had a simplified chord panel (Major, Minor, 7th and Diminished chords only) and traditional organ-type voices for the right-hand keyboard. This model also used solid-state circuitry.

In addition to Hammond, Wurlitzer, Farfisa and Estey Organ made electronic chord organs.

In 1958, Magnus Organ Corporation introduced its electric chord organs, similar to electrically blown small home reed organs.Since then, chord organs were generally designed as instruments for beginners, and separated from the mainstream of home electronic organs. In addition to Magnus, Emenee, Bontempi and Belcanto made electric chord organs. In Italy, Bontempi's Chord Organ, a small keyboard organ modelled on the Hammond, was popular with children in the 1970s.

== Gallery ==
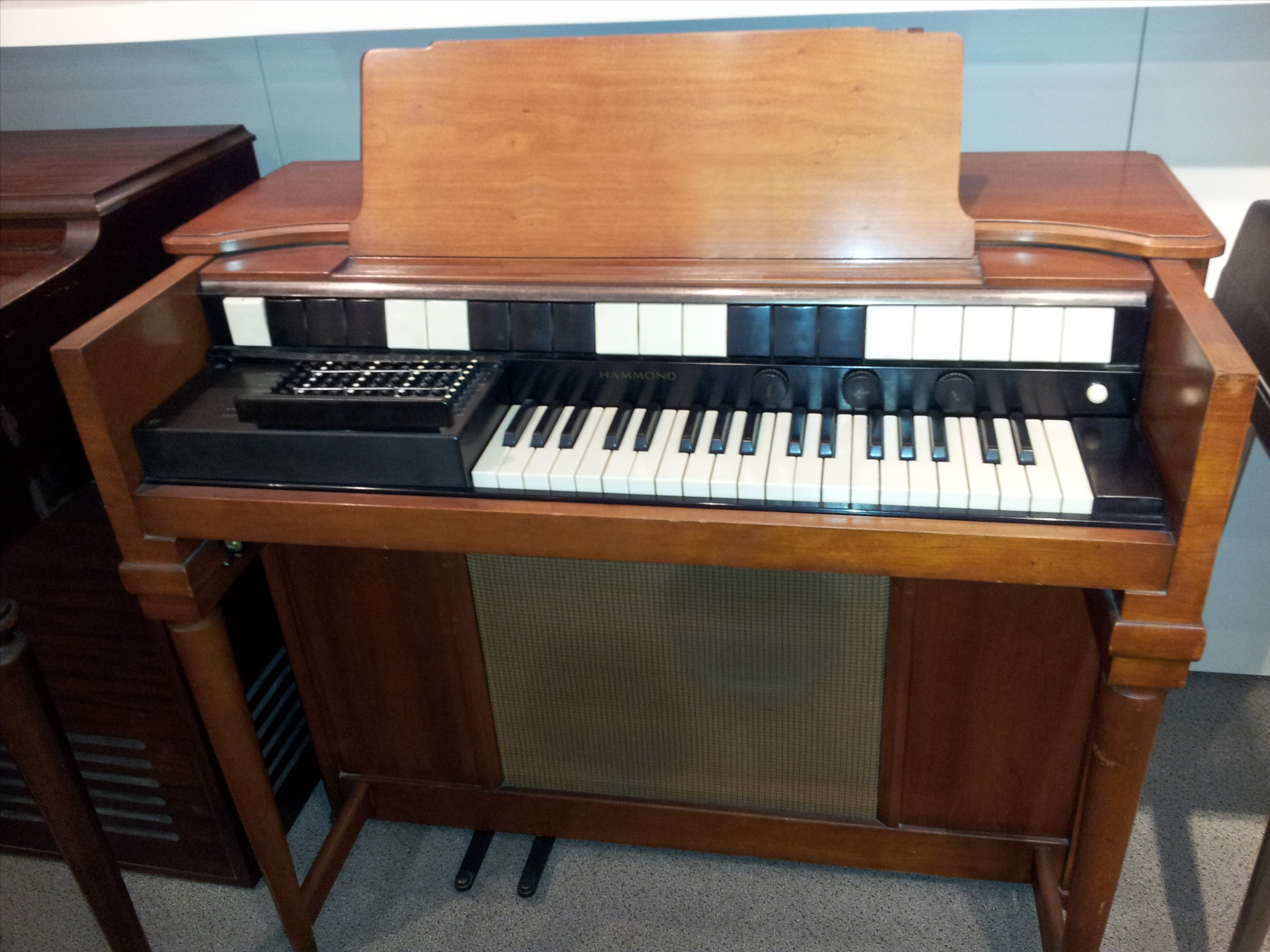
Hammond S-6 Chord Organ (c.1950, electronic organ)

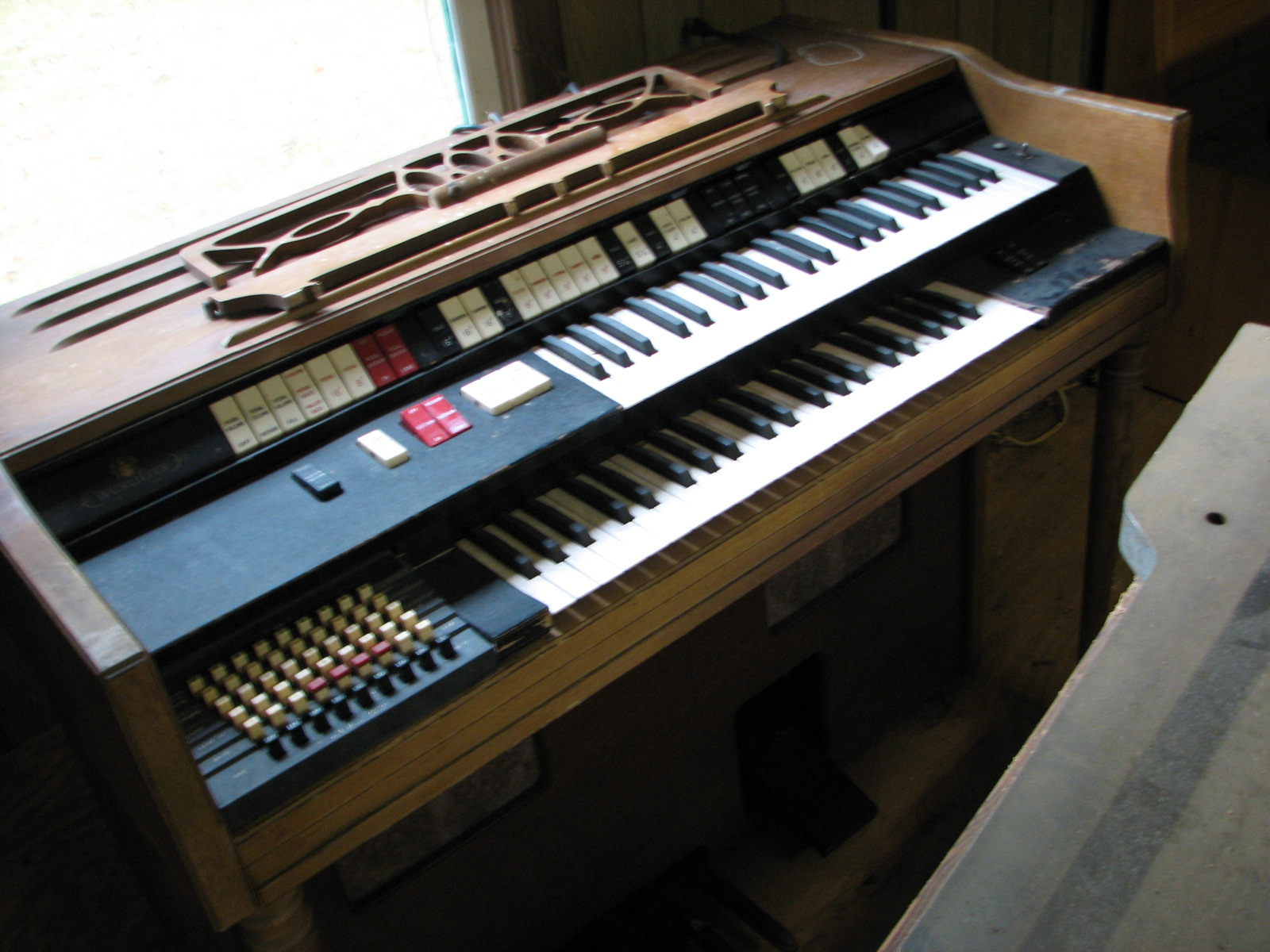
Wurlitzer Model 4100 BP (1959–1963, electronic organ)

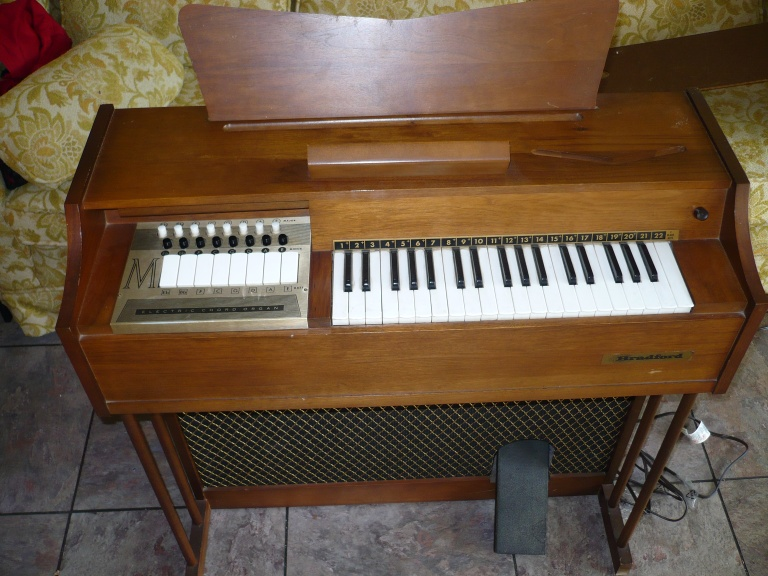
Magnus Chord Organ Model 890 (after 1960s, electrically blown reed organ)

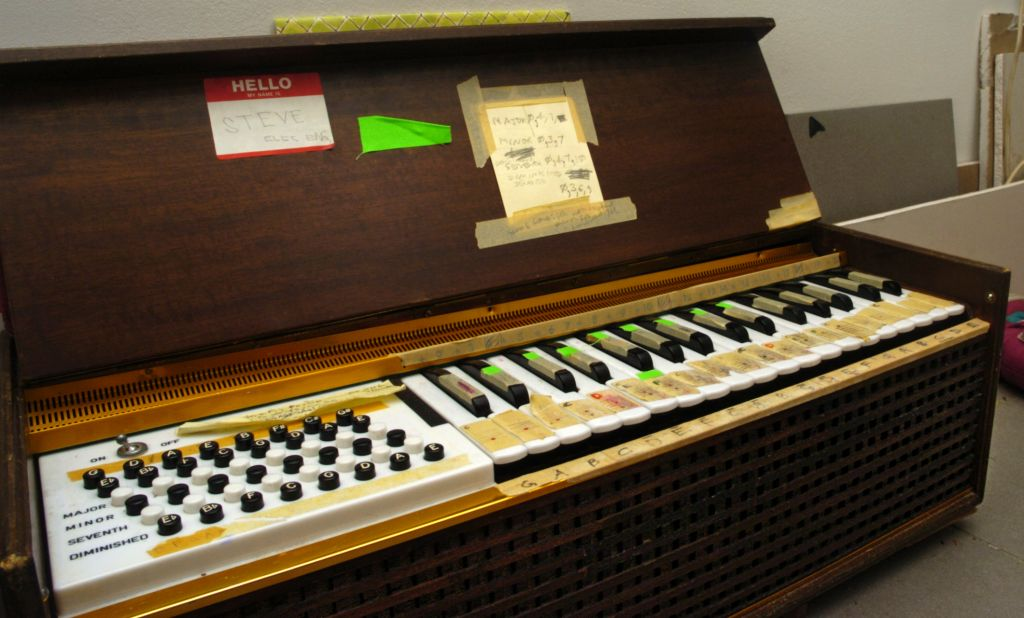
A chord organ with displacement-sensitive keys

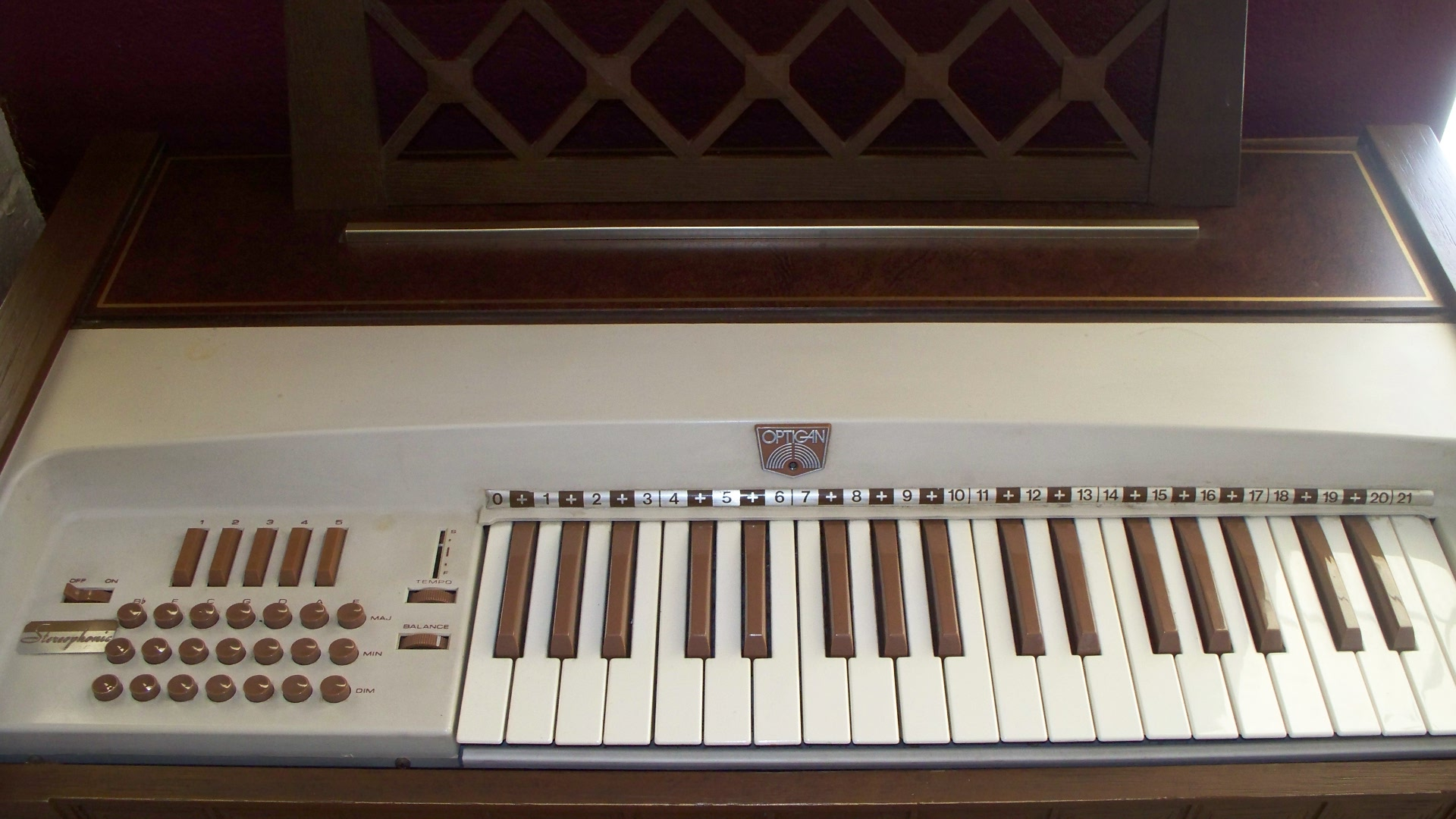
Optigan (1971, optical sampling organ)

== Chord organ musicians ==
- David Bowie on "Memory of a Free Festival" on his second album, David Bowie, AKA Space Oddity.
- Hal Shutz on "Organ and Firelight," Columbia album CL-906
- Jesse Crawford on four albums for Decca: "Popular Encores," "Pops by the Poet," "Hits on the Hammond" and "Beautiful Dreamer."
- Jessie Leeds (daughter of Jesse Crawford) on Decca album, "Popular Organ Favorites."
- Judd Taylor, in conjunction with Porter Heaps on Columbia album "A Mighty Fortress."
- Rami Jaffee
- Daniel Johnston
- The Microphones/Mount Eerie
- Modest Mouse (on the album Sad Sappy Sucker).
- The Music Tapes
- Benevento/Russo Duo
- Elliott Smith
- Cortney Tidwell
- The Residents (Prior to The 13th Anniversary Tour)

Chord organs have seen a recent revival amongst minimalist and ambient musicians.
