= Real Detroit Weekly =

- Type: Alternative weekly
- Format: Arts and Entertainment
- Publisher: John J. Badanjek
- Founded: 1999
- Ceased publication: 2014
- Headquarters: 615 S. Washington Ave Royal Oak, MI 48067; United States
- Circulation: 75,000
- OCLC number: 702905552

Real Detroit Weekly (often called just Real Detroit) was a weekly newspaper distributed free of charge every Wednesday from 1999 to 2014, that focused mainly on entertainment news from metro Detroit. It had a proportion of advertisements similar to the Metro Times (and some of the same advertisers). Both publications were usually available at the same establishments. In May 2014, the two papers merged.

Real Detroit was a cornerstone for local music and arts. Their collection of unique writers worked hard to keep that fact shining high. For most bands between 1999-2004, Real Detroit was their first or pivotal piece of press.
