= Metro Times =

Newspaper in Detroit, Michigan

Detroit Metro Times

- AAN award winning cover of the Aug. 8-14, 2018 Metro Times, by Eric Millikin.
- Type: Alternative weekly
- Owner: Big Lou Holdings LLC
- Publisher: Chris Keating
- Editor: Lee DeVito
- Founded: 1980
- Headquarters: 30 E. Canfield St., Detroit, Michigan 48201
- Circulation: 50,000
- ISSN: 0746-4045
- OCLC number: 10024235
- Website: metrotimes.com

The Detroit Metro Times is a progressive alternative weekly newspaper located in Detroit, Michigan. It is the largest circulating weekly newspaper in the metro Detroit area.

The Metro Times was an official sponsor of the now-defunct Detroit Festival of the Arts, where one of the stages is named after it.

== History and content ==
Founded in 1980, the Metro Times since its inception has been supported entirely by advertising and distributed free of charge every Wednesday in newsstands, businesses, and libraries around the city of Detroit and its suburbs. Compared to the two dailies, the Detroit Free Press and the Detroit News, the Metro Times has a liberal orientation, like its later competitor Real Detroit Weekly. As of 2014, average circulation for the Metro Times was 50,000 weekly and it was available at more than 1,200 locations. Average readership is just over 700,000 weekly.

Its annual "Best of Detroit" survey awards local businesses. The categories include "Public Square" (city life); "Spend the Night" (nightlife and bars); "Nutritional Value" (restaurants and food); and "Real Deal" (retail and other stores).

Syndicated alternative comics run by the Metro Times have in the past included Perry Bible Fellowship, This Modern World, Eric Monster Millikin and Red Meat. The Metro Times also prints Dan Savage's Savage Love sex advice column (which replaced Isadora Alman's Ask Isadora sex advice column) and Cal Garrison's Horoscopes (which replaced Rob Brezsny's Free Will Astrology). Starting with the January 19–25 issue, the Metro Times had its own exclusive crossword, crafted by Brooklyn-based cruciverbalist Ben Tausig, who appears in the documentary Wordplay. Editors cut the crossword in May 2008 to save space.

The paper was founded in 1980 by co-publishers Ron Williams and Laura Markham, with Williams as editor and Markham as business manager. In December 2012, Metro Times Editor W. Kim Heron announced his departure. Heron had previously been the paper's managing editor. In March 2013, after three months during which Michael Jackman was interim editor, the publisher named Bryan Gottlieb as Editor-in-Chief.

In 2013, Times-Shamrock Communications sold the newspaper to Euclid Media Group. The company dissolved in August 2023 and the sold to Chris Keating, operating under the name Big Lou Holdings LLC.

In April 2014, Valerie Vande Panne, former editor of High Times, was named editor-in-chief. In May 2014, the Metro Times merged with Real Detroit Weekly, which had been a Detroit-area alternative weekly paper since 1999. Dustin Blitchok took over as editor-in-chief in February 2016, before resigning from the position in November of the same year. Former Metro Times staff writer and associate editor for Hour Detroit Lee DeVito was named editor-in-chief following Blitchok's departure.

Euclid Media Group dissolved in August 2023 and the newspaper was sold to Chris Keating, operating under the name Big Lou Holdings LLC.

== Offices ==
The headquarters are located in Midtown Detroit. It was previously headquartered in the Detroit Cornice and Slate Company Building in Downtown Detroit. The Metro Times moved to the Cornice and Slate building in the 1990s and building owners constructed a wraparound expansion to give the newspaper additional room. In 2013 Blue Cross Blue Shield purchased the Cornice and Slate building, forcing the Metro Times to move to a leased space in Ferndale. According to editor-in-chief Lee DeVito, the newspaper intended to eventually return to Detroit. In 2018, the Metro Times returned to Detroit, moving into the Arnold E. Frank Building in Midtown.

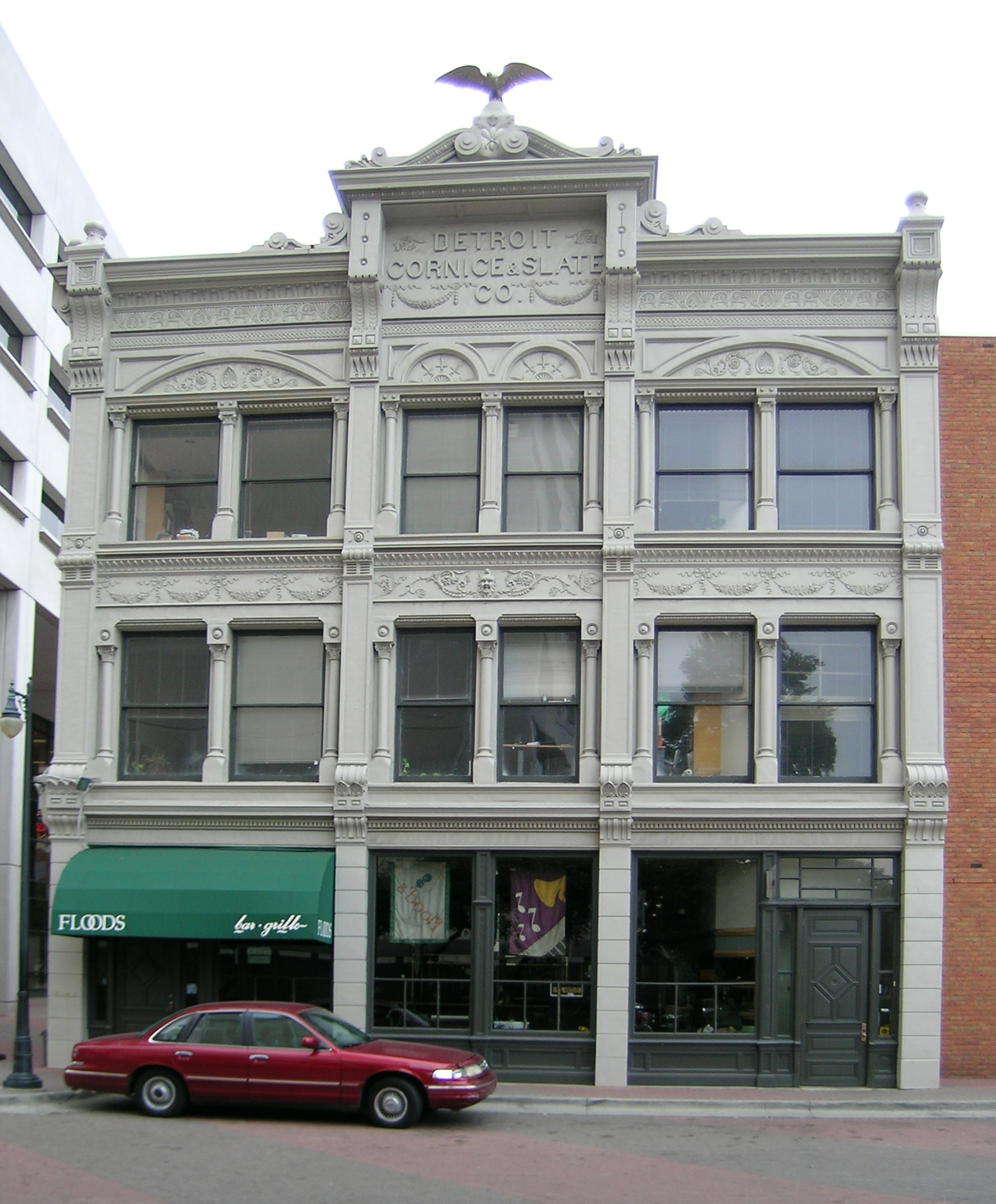
Detroit Cornice and Slate Company Building, former headquarters
