= Kevin Morby discography =

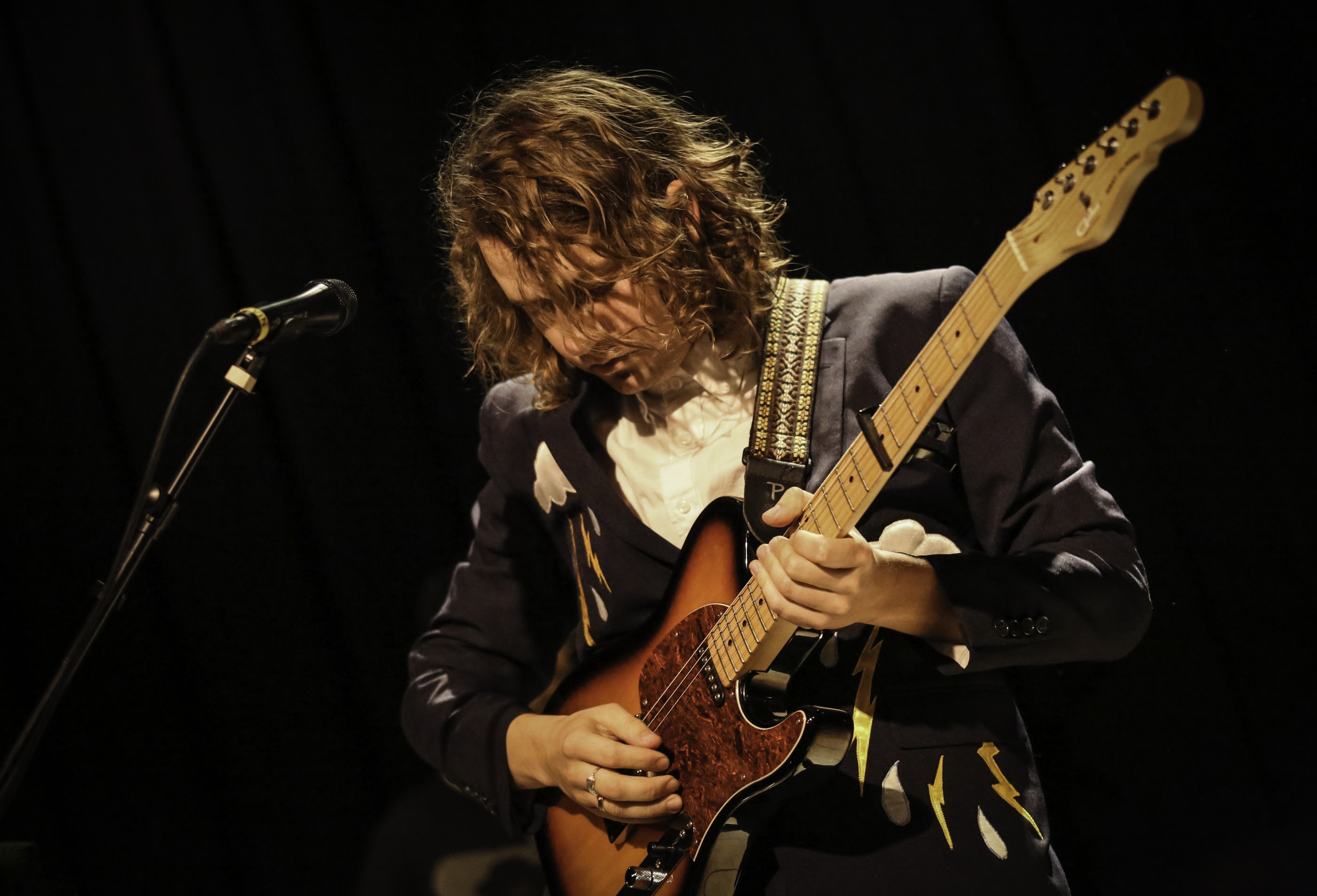
- Kevin Morby playing at the Cedar Cultural Center in Minneapolis, 2018
- Studio albums: 8
- EPs: 1
- Compilation albums: 1
- Singles: 13
- Music videos: 11

American indie rock musician Kevin Morby has released seven studio albums, thirteen singles, and eleven music videos.

== Albums ==
=== Studio albums ===
List of albums
Title	Album details	Peak chart positions
Title	Album details	NZ
Harlem River	Released: November 26, 2013; Label: Woodsist; Formats: CD, LP, digital download	—
Still Life	Released: October 14, 2014; Label: Woodsist; Formats: CD, LP, digital download	—
Singing Saw	Released: April 15, 2016; Label: Dead Oceans; Formats: CD, LP, digital download	—
City Music	Released: June 16, 2017; Label: Dead Oceans; Formats: CD, LP, digital download	—
Oh My God	Released: April 26, 2019; Label: Dead Oceans; Formats: CD, LP, digital download	—
Sundowner	Released: October 16, 2020; Label: Dead Oceans; Formats: CD, LP, digital download	—
This Is a Photograph	Released: May 13, 2022; Label: Dead Oceans; Formats: CD, LP, digital download	—
Little Wide Open	Released: May 15, 2026; Label: Dead Oceans; Formats: CD, LP, digital download	27

=== Compilation albums ===
Title	Album details
A Night at the Little Los Angeles	Released: October 8, 2021; Label: Dead Oceans; Formats: LP, digital download
More Photographs (A Continuum)	Released: May 26, 2023; Label: Dead Oceans; Formats: LP, digital download

== EPs ==
Title	EP details
Live at Third Man Records	Released: September 7, 2018; Label: Third Man; Formats: LP, digital download

== Singles ==
List of singles, showing year released and album name
Title	Year	Album
"My Name"	2014	—N/a
"Moonshiner"/"Bridge to Gaia"	2015	—N/a
"Tiny Fires"	2016	—N/a
"Beautiful Strangers"/"No Place to Fall"	2016	—N/a
"Baltimore (Sky at Night)"/"Baltimore (County Line)"	2017	—N/a
"Harlem River Dub" (Peaking Lights Remix)	2018	—N/a
"No Halo"	2019	Oh My God
"Campfire"	2020	Sundowner
"Don't Underestimate Midwest American Sun"	2020	Sundowner
"Wander"	2020	Sundowner
"Sundowner"	2020	Sundowner
"Beautiful Strangers" (featuring Waxahatchee)	2020	—N/a
"Virginia Beach" (with Hamilton Leithauser)	2021	—N/a
"This Is a Photograph"	2022	This Is a Photograph
"Rock Bottom"	2022	This Is a Photograph
"A Random Act of Kindness"	2022	This Is a Photograph

== Split singles ==
Title	Year	Other artist
"Solo Family Creeps"	2009	G. Lucas Crane
"Farewell Transmission"/"The Dark Don't Hide It"	2018	Waxahatchee

== Album appearances ==
Title	Year	Artist	Album	Notes
"Danger Bird Blues"	2008	Ad Astra Per Aspera	Danger Bird Blues/RRRip-It-Up	Vocals in chorus
"RRRip-It-Up"	2008	Ad Astra Per Aspera	Danger Bird Blues/RRRip-It-Up	Vocals in chorus
"Mary"	2013	Dennis Callaci & Simon Joyner	New Secrets	Electric guitar
"Let's Make History Bleed"	2013	Dennis Callaci & Simon Joyner	New Secrets	Backing vocals
"Beat By Beat"	2013	Dennis Callaci & Simon Joyner	New Secrets	Backing vocals
"San Antonio"	2013	Dennis Callaci & Simon Joyner	New Secrets	Percussion
"Lost Invitations"	2013	Dennis Callaci & Simon Joyner	New Secrets	Percussion
"Caught in My Eye"	2016	Various artists	Lagniappe Sessions, Vol. 1	Vocals and guitar
"I Only Have Eyes for You"	2017	Various artists	Resistance Radio: The Man in the High Castle Album	Vocals
"Harlem River (Recable Remix)"	2017	Recable	Boeser Grid	Vocals and guitar
"Warrior"	2018	Air Waves	Warrior	Vocals
"24th Amendment"	2018	Various artists	27: The Most Perfect Album	Vocals

== Music videos ==
Title	Year	Director
"Harlem River"	2013	Adarsha Benjamin
"If You Leave and If You Marry"	2014	—N/a
"All of My Life"	2014	Patrick O'Dell
"Dancer"	2015	Elizabeth Skadden
"Parade"	2015	Elise Tyler
"I Have Been to the Mountain"	2016	Phillip Lopez
"Dorothy"	2016	Christopher Good
"Aboard My Train"	2017	Kevin Morby
"City Music"	2017	Christopher Good
"Downtown's Lights"	2017	Hugo Jouxtel
"No Halo"	2019	Christopher Good
