= Libera Award for Best American Roots Record =

Annual US music award

Libera Award for Best Americana Record
- Awarded for: quality Americana records
- Country: United States
- Presented by: American Association of Independent Music (A2IM)
- First award: 2018
- Currently held by: Angel Olsen, Big Time (2023)
- Website: liberaawards.com

The Libera Award for Best American Roots Record (Note: Formerly known as: Best American Roots & Folk Album (2018–2019); Best Americana Album (2020); Best Americana Record (2021–2022)) is an award presented by the American Association of Independent Music at the annual Libera Award which recognizes "best americana album released commercially in the United States by an independent label" since 2017.

American singer-songwriter Aimee Mann was the first recipient of the award for her album Mental Illness. While no artist has won the award more than once, rock band Calexico is the most nominated in the category with four nominations, followed by Kevin Morby with three.

== Winners and nominees ==
Year	Winner(s)	Work	Nominees	Ref.
2018	Aimee Mann	Mental Illness	Capacity – Big Thief; City Music – Kevin Morby; Hallelujah Anyhow – Hiss Golden Messenger; Stranger in the Alps – Phoebe Bridgers	
2019	John Prine	The Tree of Forgiveness	13 Rivers – Richard Thompson; Black Cowboys – Dom Flemons; See You Around – I'm with Her; The Thread That Keeps Us – Calexico	
2020	Steve Gunn	The Unseen In Between	III – The Lumineers; Oklahoma – Keb' Mo'; Years to Burn – Calexico and Iron & Wine; Tip of the Sphere – Cass McCombs	
2021	Bonny Light Horseman	Bonny Light Horseman	Good Souls Better Angels – Lucinda Williams; Old Flowers – Courtney Marie Andrews; Seasonal Shift – Calexico; Sundowner – Kevin Morby	
2022	Madi Diaz	History of a Feeling	Another Side – Leo Nocentelli; Georgia Blue – Jason Isbell and the 400 Unit; Leftover Feelings – John Hiatt with The Jerry Douglas Band; Other You – Steve Gunn; The Pet Parade – Fruit Bats; Quietly Blowing It – Hiss Golden Messenger	
2023	Angel Olsen	Big Time	Fortune Favors the Bold – 49 Winchester; El Mirador – Calexico; The Man from Waco – Charley Crockett; This Is a Photograph – Kevin Morby; Denim & Diamonds – Nikki Lane	

== Artists that received multiple nominations ==
4 nominations

- Calexico

3 nominations

- Kevin Morby

2 nominations

- Hiss Golden Messenger
- Kevin Morby
- Steve Gunn
