= D. James Goodwin =

American record producer

- Born: Daniel James Goodwin
- Origin: Hudson Valley, New York
- Occupations: Record producer, engineer
- Website: www.djamesgoodwin.com

Daniel James Goodwin is an American record producer, recording engineer, mixing engineer, and musician based in Hudson Valley, New York. Goodwin is known for his experimental and unconventional approach to recording. He is the owner of The Isokon, a recording studio in Kingston, New York. His discography includes bands and artists such as Blitzen Trapper, Kevin Morby, Rhett Miller, The Hold Steady, The National, The New Pornographers, Bob Weir, Nanna, Bonny Light Horseman, Anaïs Mitchell, Josh Ritter, Muzz, Craig Finn, Tim Berne, Kaki King, and Goose.

== Selected discography ==
- Murder by Death – Who Will Survive, and What Will Be Left of Them? (2003)
- The Bravery – Stir the Blood (2009)
- Devo – Something for Everybody (2010)
- Matt White – It's the Good Crazy (2010)
- Rubik – Solar (2011)
- BOBBY – BOBBY (2011)
- Kelli Scarr – Dangling Teeth (2012)
- Tim Berne – You've Been Watching Me (2015)
- David Torn – Only Sky (2015)
- Craig Finn – Faith in the Future (2015)
- Kevin Morby – Singing Saw (2016)
- Whitney – Light Upon the Lake (2016)
- Bob Weir – Blue Mountain (2016)
- Craig Finn – We All Want the Same Things (2017)
- Heather Woods Broderick – Invitation (2019)
- Craig Finn – I Need a New War (2019)
- Kevin Morby – Oh My God (2019)
- Bonny Light Horseman – Bonny Light Horseman (2020)
- Muzz – Muzz (2020)
- Kevin Morby – This Is a Photograph (2022)
- Craig Finn – A Legacy of Rentals (2022)
- Goose – Dripfield (2022)
- Bonny Light Horseman – Rolling Golden Holy (2022)
- Heather Woods Broderick – Labyrinth (2023)
- Nanna – How to Start a Garden (2023)
- Goose – Autumn Crossing (2023)
- Goose – Everything Must Go (2025)
- Goose – Chain Yer Dragon (2025)
