= Feel It Now =

Feel It Now may refer to:

- "Feel It Now", song from the Now United discography
- "Feel It Now", song by The Fountainhead (band) also featured on the Self Aid album
- "Feel It Now", song by Tonic from Tonic
- "Feel It Now", song by Fang Wu
- "Feel It Now", song by Black Rebel Motorcycle Club from Howl
- "Feel It Now", song by Goose from Everything Must Go
