= A Legacy of Rentals =

2022 studio album by Craig Finn

Studio album by Craig Finn
- Released: May 20, 2022
- Recorded: 2021
- Studios: The Clubhouse; The Boom Boom Room; Spacebomb Studio, Richmond, Virginia (strings)
- Genres: Indie rock; singer-songwriter
- Length: 46:03
- Labels: Positive Jams; Thirty Tigers
- Producer: Josh Kaufman

Craig Finn chronology
I Need a New War (2019)	A Legacy of Rentals (2022)	Always Been (2025)

Singles from A Legacy of Rentals
- 1. "Messing with the Settings" Released: March 24, 2022

A Legacy of Rentals is the fifth solo studio album by the American singer-songwriter Craig Finn, frontman of the indie rock band the Hold Steady. It was released on May 20, 2022, through Finn's Positive Jams imprint and Thirty Tigers. Produced by longtime collaborator Josh Kaufman and engineered by D. James Goodwin, the album largely replaces the horn arrangements of Finn's previous three solo records with a fourteen-piece string section arranged by Trey Pollard, alongside increased use of drum machines and spoken-word delivery.

Written during 2020 and recorded the following year, the album is organized around the theme of memory and its unreliability, with narrators recalling people who have died or drifted out of their lives. It received generally favorable reviews and prompted Finn to launch the podcast That's How I Remember It, which examines the relationship between memory and creativity.

== Background and recording ==
Finn wrote the album across 2020, a period he later described as shadowed by the COVID-19 pandemic and by the murder of George Floyd in his hometown of Minneapolis; the songs make no direct reference to either event. He was also mourning the death of a friend at the time. Where his preceding trilogy of solo albums — Faith in the Future (2015), We All Want the Same Things (2017) and I Need a New War (2019) — had concentrated on survivors, Finn turned on A Legacy of Rentals to characters who did not make it, and to the imperfect recollections of those left behind.

The album was recorded in 2021 with Kaufman producing and Goodwin engineering and mixing. Contributors included drummer Joe Russo, multi-instrumentalist Michael Libramento, saxophonist Stuart Bogie, and vocalists Cassandra Jenkins and Annie Nero. A fourteen-piece string section arranged and conducted by Trey Pollard was recorded at Spacebomb Studio in Richmond, Virginia.

== Composition ==
Critics noted a shift in Finn's sonic palette: apart from a saxophone part on "Birthdays", the brass of his earlier solo work is absent in favor of strings, keyboards and programmed percussion. Several tracks lean heavily on spoken narration, with Finn alternating between speaking and singing voices; the nearly six-minute opener "Messing with the Settings" is delivered almost entirely as speech apart from its sung refrain.

The songs are built as character sketches. "The Amarillo Kid" follows a low-level criminal who takes a job in Buffalo, New York before fleeing west, set to a synthesizer-driven groove; "Curtis & Shepard" traces one character being dispatched to find another in Riverside, California; and "A Break from the Barrage" follows a protagonist through a day that returns her to where she began. Writing in PopMatters, Chris Conaton suggested that recurring details and locations hint at connections between the narratives, in the manner of Finn's earlier work with Lifter Puller and the Hold Steady, though the links are left unresolved.

== Release and promotion ==
Finn announced the album on March 24, 2022, alongside the lead single "Messing with the Settings"; a music video for the song and a run of summer tour dates with his backing band the Uptown Controllers followed shortly after. The album was issued on CD, standard black vinyl, a limited translucent white vinyl pressing, and digitally.

In 2022 Finn launched That's How I Remember It, a podcast co-produced and distributed by Talkhouse in which he interviews musicians, writers and filmmakers about the role of memory in their work. Finn has said the series grew directly out of writing and recording the album; the debut episode featured Patterson Hood of Drive-By Truckers.

== Critical reception ==
Professional ratings
Aggregate scores
Source	Rating
Metacritic	80/100
Review scores
Source	Rating
Mojo	4/5 stars
Pitchfork	8.0/10

A Legacy of Rentals received generally favorable reviews. At Metacritic, which assigns a normalized rating out of 100 to reviews from mainstream publications, the album holds a score of 80 based on nine reviews.

Pitchfork identified Finn's writing as the central draw and judged him more assured than ever as both storyteller and songwriter. Mojo praised his eye for detail and his use of the string section and drum machines. Uncut described the record as a meditation on memory and transience in which Finn's flat delivery is set against orchestral arrangements. Writing for Paste, Eric R. Danton found the characters vivid and fully realized, arguing that Finn's ability to imply whole lives in a couple of lines remains unusual among his contemporaries.

== Track listing ==
All songs written by Craig Finn.

No.	Title	Length
1.	"Messing with the Settings"
2.	"The Amarillo Kid"
3.	"Birthdays"
4.	"The Year We Fell Behind"
5.	"Due to Depart"
6.	"Curtis & Shepard"
7.	"Never Any Horses"
8.	"Jessamine"
9.	"A Break from the Barrage"
10.	"This Is What It Looks Like"
Total length:		46:03

== Personnel ==
Credits adapted from the album's liner notes.

Musicians

- Craig Finn – vocals, guitar
- Josh Kaufman – guitar, bass, piano, organ, synthesizer, Wurlitzer, Clavinet, drum machine, drum programming, percussion, vocals
- Michael Libramento – bass, organ, synthesizer, Clavinet, guitar, percussion, vocals
- Joe Russo – drums, percussion, drum programming, vocals
- Stuart Bogie – tenor saxophone
- Cassandra Jenkins – vocals
- Annie Nero – vocals
- Trey Pollard – string arrangements and conducting

Technical

- Josh Kaufman – production
- D. James Goodwin – recording, mixing, mastering
- Curtis Fye – string recording
- Vance Wellenstein – design
