= My Roaring 20's Acoustic =

Studio album by Cheap Girls
- Released: January 14, 2013
- Recorded: January 2010
- Genre: Rock
- Length: 30:21
- Label: Quote Unquote Records

Cheap Girls chronology
Giant Orange (2012)	My Roaring 20's Acoustic (2013)	BARELY ALIVE in Grand Rapids, Michigan 12/30/12 (2013)

My Roaring 20's Acoustic is a studio album by rock group Cheap Girls. It is an acoustic version of their 2009 release My Roaring 20's. It was released digitally on January 14, 2013, on Quote Unquote Records. Dan Jaquint was the engineer and also mixed the album. It was mastered in 2013 by Rick Johnson at his Cold War Studios.

== Recording ==
The album was recorded in January 2010 in Dimondale, Michigan.

== Release ==
The album was made available to download free of charge from Quote Unquote Records' website with donations being accepted to help pay for medical bills related to bass player Ian Graham's knee surgery.

== Track listing ==
Standard edition
No.	Title	Length
1.	"Sunnyside"	3:23
2.	"Ft. Lauderdale"	2:59
3.	"Hey Hey, I'm Worn Out"	2:40
4.	"I Had A Motorcycle"	3:30
5.	"Sleeping Weather"	2:55
6.	"Something That I Need"	2:26
7.	"Modern Faces"	2:48
8.	"Lab Technicians"	2:41
9.	"All My Clean Friends"	3:27
10.	"One & Four"	3:28
Total length:		30:17
