= Big Modern! =

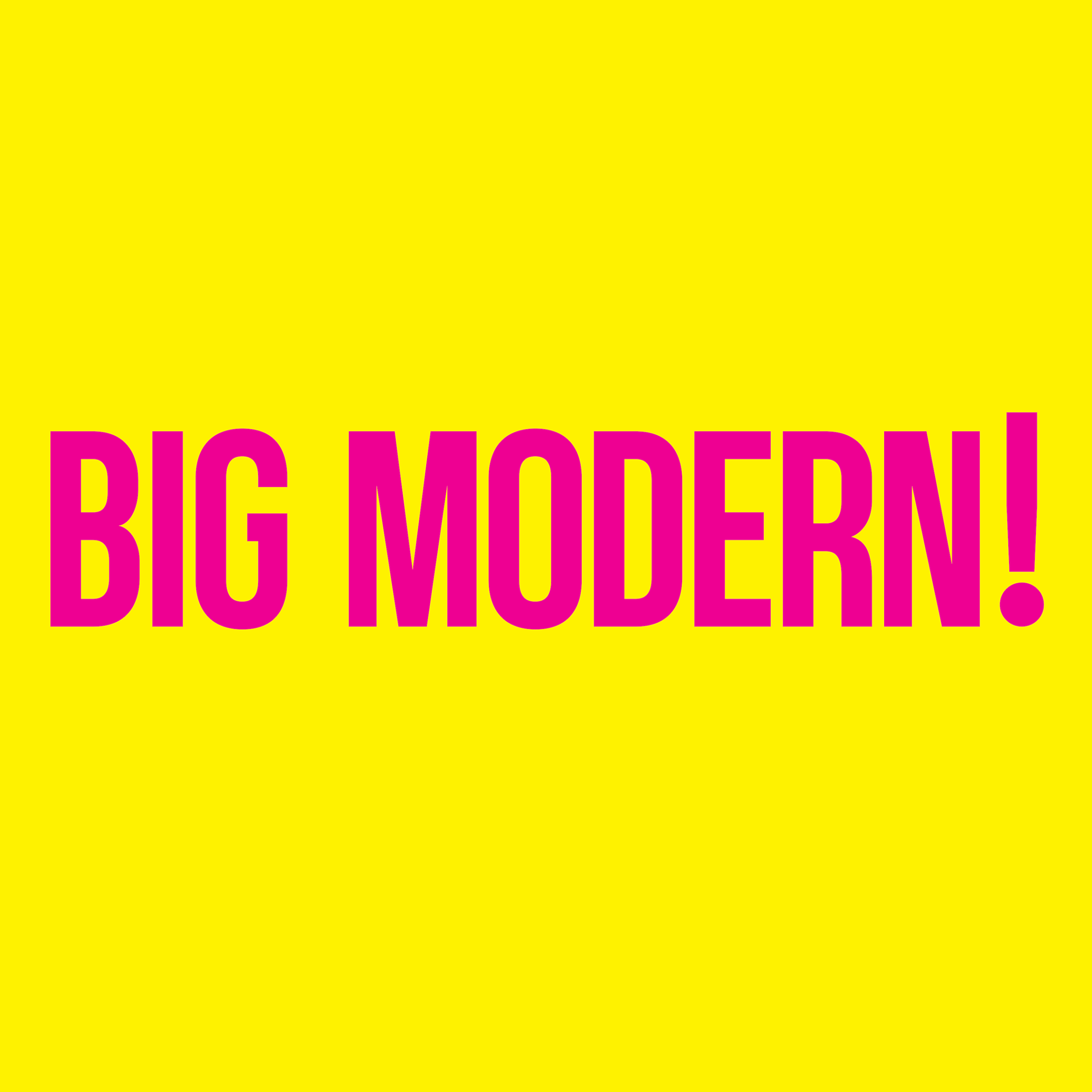

Studio album by Goose
- Released: June 12, 2026
- Studio: Allaire (Woodstock, New York); The Isokon; The Chateau
- Length: 69:52
- Label: No Coincidence
- Producer: D. James Goodwin

Goose chronology
| Everything Must Go Remixed (2026) | Big Modern! (2026) |

Singles from Big Modern!
- 1. "Good2B" Released: April 7, 2026; 2. "Torero" Released: May 5, 2026

Big Modern! (stylized in all caps) is the sixth studio album by the American rock band Goose. It was released on June 12, 2026, under the band's own label No Coincidence Records.

== Background ==
Big Modern! was announced by Goose on April 7, 2026. In news releases relating to the album, the band described it as "a fully immersive world of sound that ingeniously captures what it feels like to move through today’s overstimulated, hyperconnected society." Prior to its announcement, Goose teased the album by sitting courtside at a New York Knicks game with each member wearing hoodies that collectively spelled "F-A-C-E", a lyric from the album's title track.

== Promotion ==
Big Modern! was preceded by the release of two singles. The album's lead single, "Good2B", was released on April 7, 2026, in tandem with the album's announcement. In a press release, band guitarist Rick Mitarotonda said that the song, along with the rest of the album, "deal with the occasional state of flow amidst absurdity." The second single, "Torero", was released on May 5, 2026. Relix described the song as "an evolution of the glitzy ‘80s pop-rock that’s long captivated the band", further adding that its composition "[leans] on an insistent synth pulse, tightly-wound guitar riff and Phil Collins-grade arena drums to close in on a sense of mounting unease."

== Critical reception ==
Writing for Glide Magazine, Dave Goodwich noted the album's "relative lack of musical diversity" and concluded his review by noting that while some listeners may see it as "a regression of sorts" due to "an over-reliance on some tired musical tropes, particularly those not wholly invested in the jam band scene, there is still more than enough hook-infused melodies and genuinely gripping instrumentation to sate their die-hard fanbase and continue the group’s dramatic upward trajectory."

== Track listing ==
All tracks are written by Matthew Campbell and Rick Mitarotonda, except where noted.

Big Modern! track listing
| No. | Title | Writer(s) | Length |
|---|---|---|---|
| 1. | "Begin" | Mitarotonda | 0:59 |
| 2. | "Big Modern!" | | 6:28 |
| 3. | "Savenger" | | 4:30 |
| 4. | "You Are Here" | | 1:46 |
| 5. | "Savengersspell" | | 4:14 |
| 6. | "Good2B" | | 7:01 |
| 7. | "Media" | Cotter Ellis | 2:52 |
| 8. | "Torero" | Mitarotonda | 5:21 |
| 9. | "Faena" | Mitarotonda | 4:29 |
| 10. | "Pop" | Peter Anspach | 3:46 |
| 11. | "Salt" | Anspach; Mitarotonda | 12:43 |
| 12. | "Again" | | 1:34 |
| 13. | "Good Times // End Times" | | 3:36 |
| 14. | "Nocturne" | | 7:40 |
| 15. | "Postplace" | | 2:53 |
| Total length: | | | 69:52 |

=== Notes ===
- "Pop," “Media,” and “Salt" are stylized in uppercase.
- "Begin", "You Are Here", "Savengersspell", "Faena", "Again", "Nocturne", and "Postplace" are stylized in lowercase and with one or multiple parentheses in between their titles.

== Personnel ==
Credits and personnel for Big Modern! adapted from the album's liner notes.

=== Goose ===
- Rick Mitarotonda – vocals, guitars
- Peter Anspach – keyboards, synthesizers, guitars, vocals
- Trevor Weekz – bass
- Cotter Ellis – drums, percussion, vocals
- Matt Campbell – synthesizers, keyboards, vocals

=== Additional personnel ===
- D. James Goodwin – guitars, synthesizers, percussion, production, recording, mixing, mastering
- Gillian Pelkonen – additional engineering
- Will Thresher – art

== Charts ==
Chart performance for Big Modern!
| Chart (2026) | Peak position |
|---|---|
| US Independent Albums (Billboard) | 41 |
| US Top Album Sales (Billboard) | 18 |
