= Faith in the Future =

Faith in the Future may refer to:

- Faith in the Future (TV series), a British TV series that aired on ITV from 1995 to 1998
- Faith in the Future (Craig Finn album), released in 2015
- Faith in the Future (Louis Tomlinson album), released in 2022
- Faith in the Future World Tour (2023), in support of the album
