= Always Been =

Studio album by Craig Finn
- Released: April 4, 2025
- Studios: Boulevard Recording, Hollywood One Cue, Burbank
- Length: 44:12
- Labels: Tamarac Recordings, Thirty Tigers
- Producer: Adam Granduciel

Craig Finn chronology
A Legacy of Rentals (2022)	Always Been (2025)

Singles from Always Been
- 1. "People of Substance" Released: January 24, 2025; 2. "Bethany" Released: February 28, 2025

Always Been is the sixth solo album by the American musician and the Hold Steady member Craig Finn, released on April 4, 2025 on Tamarac Recordings and Thirty Tigers. Produced by Adam Granduciel, the album features the members of the War on Drugs backing Finn throughout.

== Release and reception ==
Professional ratings
Review scores
Source	Rating
Mojo	4/5 stars
MusicOMH	4/5 stars
New Noise Magazine	3.5/5 stars
PopMatters	6/10
Record Collector	4/5 stars
Spectrum Culture	78/100%

Writing for Mojo Magazine, Andrew Perry states that it "charts the fall and redemption of a clergyman lacking in faith, but such is the novelistic depth of Finn's fiction that there’s ample room for familiar blue-collar tropes (fiscal strife, domestic tension, drinking, upping sticks to start over), plus lashings of trademark Catholic guilt." In a Paste Magazine review, Hayden Merrick wrote that the album "presents Finn’s most cohesive overarching story. Usually working with capsule standalone vignettes that connect thematically but not directly, he instead constructs an extended epic centered on an ex-reverend", noting that "What’s unique about Clayton compared to other Craig Finn-penned protagonists is that his protracted journey of self-improvement necessitates a rejection of the road", he concludes by saying that "Craig Finn gives us more hope than ever within Always Been's pages, but that hope only arrives after tragedy."

== Track listing ==
No.	Title	Length
1.	"Bethany"	5:49
2.	"People of Substance"	2:59
3.	"Crumbs"	3:43
4.	"Luke & Leanna"	3:30
5.	"The Man I've Always Been"	4:07
6.	"Fletcher's"	5:39
7.	"A Man Needs a Vocation"	4:49
8.	"I Walk with a Cane"	4:36
9.	"Clayton"	3:55
10.	"Postcards"	8:05
Total length:		44:12

== Charts ==
Weekly chart performance for Always Been
Chart (2025)	Peak position
Scottish Albums (Official Charts)	38
UK Americana Albums (Official Charts)	12
