= Barely Alive in Grand Rapids, Michigan 12/30/12 =

BARELY ALIVE in Grand Rapids, Michigan 12/30/12

Live album by Cheap Girls
- Released: February 5, 2013
- Recorded: December 30, 2012
- Genre: Rock
- Label: Business Casual

Cheap Girls chronology
My Roaring 20's Acoustic (2013)	BARELY ALIVE in Grand Rapids, Michigan 12/30/12 (2013)	Famous Graves (2014)

BARELY ALIVE in Grand Rapids, Michigan 12/30/12 is the first live album by rock group Cheap Girls. It was released digitally on February 5, 2013, and is the first release on the band's own record label, Business Casual.

== Recording ==
The album was recorded on December 30, 2012, at The Intersection in Grand Rapids, Michigan.

== Release ==
The announcement for the album came on February 1, 2013. It is only scheduled to be released digitally.

== Track listing ==
Standard edition
No.	Title	Length
1.	"Gone All Summer"	4:01
2.	"Communication Blues"	3:11
3.	"Hey Hey, I'm Worn Out"	2:19
4.	"Pure Hate"	3:43
5.	"No One To Blame"	3:14
6.	"Ruby"	3:29
7.	"Modern Faces"	2:35
8.	"Parking Lot"	3:26
Total length:		25:58
