= This Is a Photograph =

Studio album by Kevin Morby
- Released: May 13, 2022
- Studios: Slow Fawn (Accord, New York); Sam Phillips (Memphis, Tennessee)
- Length: 45:18
- Label: Dead Oceans
- Producer: Sam Cohen

Kevin Morby chronology
Sundowner (2020)	This Is a Photograph (2022)	Music from Montana Story (2023)

Singles from This Is a Photograph
- 1. "This Is a Photograph" Released: March 3, 2022; 2. "Rock Bottom" Released: March 30, 2022; 3. "A Random Act of Kindness" Released: April 28, 2022

This Is a Photograph is the seventh studio album by American indie rock musician Kevin Morby, released on May 13, 2022, on Dead Oceans. The album is inspired by Morby's fascination with the city of Memphis, Tennessee, and was produced by musician Sam Cohen, who had previously worked with Morby on his albums, Singing Saw (2016) and Oh My God (2019).

It features a guest appearance by indie folk singer-songwriter Erin Rae. It was promoted by the singles "This Is a Photograph", "Rock Bottom" and "A Random Act of Kindness". It received acclaim from critics, who praised Morby's vulnerability and assessed it as a new artistic peak.

== Background and recording ==
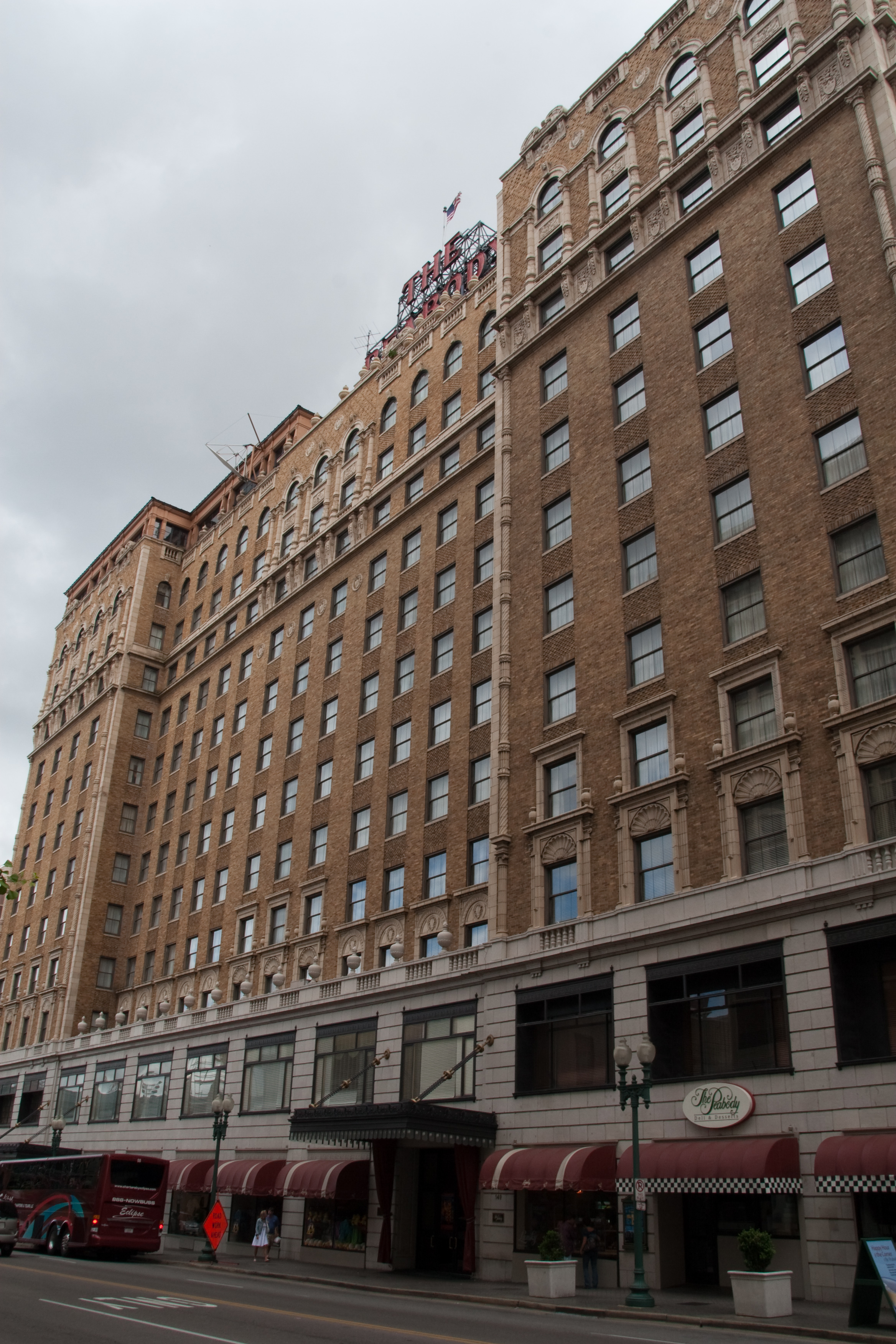
The Peabody Memphis

The album was written primarily during Morby's sojourn in Memphis, Tennessee, where he stayed at the historic Peabody Hotel. The album was inspired by Morby's own fear of death and an incident in which his father collapsed before a family dinner in January 2020 after accidentally taking double his heart medication. He began writing the album's title track after viewing old family photos with his mother the night of his father's medical scare, and was particularly struck by an image of his father around his same age posing shirtless on the lawn under the Texas sun. The album also draws inspiration from Memphis' history of tragedy, including Elvis Presley, Jeff Buckley and Jay Reatard, all of whom died in Memphis, and the Lorraine Motel, where Martin Luther King Jr. was assassinated. Morby paid visits to the Lorraine Motel, Graceland (where Elvis died) and the exact bank of the Mississippi River where Buckley drowned. He also traveled the "haunted" portion of U.S. Route 61 that extends south into the Mississippi Delta, which has a rich association with blues music. The album features backing vocals by students of the Stax Music Academy in South Memphis.

This Is a Photograph was produced by Sam Cohen and recorded at his Slow Fawn studio in Accord, New York. Additional recording was done by Wesley Graham at Sam Phillips Recording Studio in Memphis. Rashaan Carter completed additional engineering in New York City. The album was mixed and mastered by D. James Goodwin at the Isokon in Kingston, New York.

== Critical reception ==
Professional ratings
Aggregate scores
Source	Rating
AnyDecentMusic?	8.1/10
Metacritic	87/100
Review scores
Source	Rating
AllMusic	4.5/5 stars
Beats Per Minute	76%
The Line of Best Fit	9/10
Mojo	4/5 stars
NME	5/5 stars
Paste	8.2/10
Pitchfork	7.3/10
Record Collector	4/5 stars
Rolling Stone	4/5 stars
Uncut	9/10

This Is a Photograph was met with critical acclaim. At Metacritic, which assigns a normalized rating out of 100 to reviews from professional publications, the album received an average score of 87, based on 11 reviews. Aggregator AnyDecentMusic? gave it 8.1 out of 10, based on their assessment of the critical consensus.

NME's Jordan Bassett gave the album a perfect 5-star rating, calling it an "epic ode to the fragility of life and the consequent need to cherish love, joy and family". Kat Bouza of Rolling Stone called This Is a Photograph "an album of emotional ephemera set to song" that is populated by "a cast of characters constantly adrift, grasping for emotional life rafts." Notably, she writes "the album hits its strongest points when Morby opens himself up to reckless abandon".

Erin Osmon of Uncut gave the album a 9 out of 10 rating, writing, "With This Is a Photograph, he offers the wisest and most assured rendering of the Middle American vision he's been honing of late, one where Dylan-esque anti-singing narrates impassioned, earnest and earthen tales of family, place, love and heroes, and a crack band shakes the rafters." Ellen Johnson of Paste considered it the "convergence" of his entire discography, an album that showcases the breadth of his "talent and wisdom" whilst not overshadowing his previous work. Fred Thomas of AllMusic assessed the album as finding Morby at his most direct in vulnerability and that it featured more complex and "best-sounding" arrangements, concluding that these qualities make it "one of the best chapters in an already impressive catalog; one that finds a new artistic depth as it faces some of life's eternal concerns". Danny Eccleston of Mojo called it "a record that feels warmer, wiser and less forced than any of his albums so far." Brian Howe of Pitchfork wrote, "By infusing his artful folk-rock with the unfailingly pleasing sounds of vintage gospel and soul, Morby has made an ambitious record that proudly stands out in his sprawling catalog."

== Track listing ==
All tracks are written by Kevin Morby.

This Is a Photograph track listing
No.	Title	Length
1.	"Intro"	0:32
2.	"This Is a Photograph"	3:30
3.	"A Random Act of Kindness"	4:14
4.	"Bittersweet, TN" (featuring Erin Rae)	4:13
5.	"Disappearing"	3:27
6.	"A Coat of Butterflies"	6:40
7.	"Rock Bottom"	2:44
8.	"Forever Inside a Picture"	0:14
9.	"Five Easy Pieces"	4:11
10.	"Stop Before I Cry"	4:58
11.	"It's Over"	5:21
12.	"Goodbye to Good Times"	5:14
Total length:		45:18

== Personnel ==
- Kevin Morby – guitar (2–7, 12), vocals (2–7, 9–12), hand claps (2), melodica (5), samples (5, 6), piano (6), snaps (11)
- Sam Cohen – bass (2–7, 9–11), guitar (2, 3, 9), hand claps (2), piano (4–6), drums (5), organ (5), drum machine (6), snaps (11), lapsteel (12), tambourine (12), production, engineering
- Nick Kinsey – drums (2, 4, 7), hand claps (2), percussion (4)
- Josh Jaeger – percussion (2), drums (3, 9–11), snaps (11)
- Jared Samuel – organ (2, 3), piano (3–11)
- Cochemea Gastelum – saxophone (2, 6, 10), flute (10, 11)
- Alecia Chakour – vocals (2), tambourine (2, 3), backing vocals (5, 7, 11)
- Leah Buckley – backing vocals (2, 6)
- Brenae Johnson – backing vocals (2, 6)
- Briana Johnson – backing vocals (2, 6)
- Zalissa Stewart – backing vocals (2, 6)
- Brittney Walker – backing vocals (2, 6)
- Freddie Cohen – spoken word (2)
- Annie Beedy – spoken word (2)
- Oliver Hill – violin (3, 4, 9–11)
- Meg Hill – violin (3, 4, 9–11)
- Charlotte Hill – viola (3, 4, 9–11)
- Sam Quiggins – cello (3, 4, 9–11)
- Erin Rae – vocals (4)
- Eric D. Johnson – banjo (4)
- Rachel Baiman – fiddle (4)
- Makaya McCraven – drums (6)
- Brandee Younger – harp (6)
- Cassandra Jenkins – backing vocals (7), vocals (11)
- Tim Heidecker – laughs (7)
- Alia Shawkat – laughs (7)
- Jerry Phillips – spoken word (9)
- Tufted titmouse – whistle (11)
- Wesley Graham – additional recording
- Rashaan Carter – additional engineering
- D. James Goodwin – mixing, mastering
- Johnny Eastlund – photography
- Mike Krol – design

== Charts ==
Chart performance for This Is a Photograph
Chart (2022)	Peak position
Belgian Albums (Ultratop Flanders)	79
Belgian Albums (Ultratop Wallonia)	188
German Albums (Offizielle Top 100)	38
Scottish Albums (Official Charts)	42
UK Album Downloads (Official Charts)	54
UK Independent Albums (Official Charts)	8

== More Photographs (A Continuum) ==
A companion album to This Is a Photograph, called More Photographs (A Continuum), was released on Dead Oceans on May 26, 2023. It features reimagined versions of three songs from This Is a Photograph, as well as six new songs.
