= Cheap Girls =

American rock band

- Cheap Girls playing at Mac's Bar in Lansing, Michigan.

Background information
- Origin: Lansing, Michigan, United States
- Genres: Power pop, indie rock, punk rock, pop punk, heartland rock
- Years active: 2007–2017
- Labels: All in Vinyl, Art of the Underground, Asian Man Records, Bermuda Mohawk, Rise Records, Paper + Plastick, No Idea Records, Quote Unquote Records, Business Casual, Suburban Home Records, Xtra Mile
- Past members: Ian Graham; Ben Graham; Adam Aymor; Jason Draper

Cheap Girls were an American rock band from Lansing, Michigan. The band consisted of brothers Ian Graham (guitar, lead vocals) and Ben Graham (drums, back-up vocals), Jason Draper (Bass) and Adam Aymor (guitar). Formed in 2007, the band quickly began recording and touring, releasing their first album, Find Me a Drink Home in 2008. Together, they released four full-length studio albums. The band toured with bands such as Against Me!, The Gaslight Anthem, The Hold Steady, and The Bouncing Souls across the US and Europe. Their sound was often compared to The Replacements, The Lemonheads, and early Smoking Popes.

== History ==
=== Beginnings ===
Brothers Ian and Ben Graham began playing in bands when they were 11 and 13, respectively. Playing local shows and small venues in the Lansing, MI region is how they met Adam, who was playing in a different band at the time. In 2007, after their previous groups disbanded, the three formed Cheap Girls with the idea of creating back-to-basics rock. The band began playing shows and writing the music that would become their first album, Find Me a Drink Home.

=== Debut album: Find Me a Drink Home (2007–2009) ===
Their first full-length album, Find Me a Drink Home, was released on April 22, 2008, through Quote Unquote Records. On August 2, 2012, it was announced that future pressings of Find Me a Drink Home and My Roaring 20's would be released by Asian Man Records.

=== My Roaring 20's (2009–2011) ===
They toured the US extensively in support of Find Me a Drink Home, which led to the release of their sophomore album My Roaring 20's via Paper + Plastick on October 9, 2009. Again, their album was followed with tours of the US, as well as Europe, including the United Kingdom. They also played Chicago's Riot Fest and Gainesville's The Fest. The exposure landed the band an opening slot with Against Me! when they played a one-off show in Lansing, MI in 2010 while on tour with Silversun Pickups. In February 2011, the band went on a full US tour with Against Me!

=== Rise Records signing and Giant Orange (2011–2013) ===
The band signed to Rise Records for their third LP, Giant Orange, and released the album on February 21, 2012. It debuted at number 49 on the Billboard Heatseekers Albums chart and was supported by a US tour with The Sidekicks. During this time, the band also opened for The Gaslight Anthem, Against Me!, Mustard Plug, and The Bouncing Souls at shows across the US and Europe.

In March 2012, Paste Magazine listed Cheap Girls as one of the "twenty must-see bands at SXSW 2012".

=== My Roaring 20's Acoustic (2013) ===
On January 14, 2013, the band digitally released My Roaring 20's Acoustic through Quote Unquote Records. The album is an acoustic version of their 2009 release, My Roaring 20's and was made available to download for free with an option to donate. All of the donations will go towards paying for Ian Graham's medical bills from a recent knee surgery.

=== BARELY ALIVE in Grand Rapids, Michigan 12/30/12 (2013) ===
On February 5, 2013, the band digitally released BARELY ALIVE in Grand Rapids, Michigan 12/30/12 on their own record label, Business Casual. It is a live performance recorded at The Intersection in Grand Rapids, Michigan on December 30, 2012.

=== Xtra Mile Recordings and Famous Graves (2013–2017 and breakup) ===
On February 19, 2013, the band posted a picture on their Facebook page from a studio in Grand Rapids, MI stating it was "day one" of demoing for their next album. In an interview with Lansing's City Pulse published November 21, 2013, the band stated they have been recording and plan to release a new album in the spring of 2014.

On January 15, 2014, it was announced that the band had signed to the independent UK-based label Xtra Mile Recordings for a world-wide release of the album.

On February 19, 2014, it was announced that the band's next album, Famous Graves, would be released on May 13, 2014. The first single from the album, "Knock Me Over", was made available online the same day.

In support of the album, the band toured with Against Me! and The Hold Steady in the spring of 2014. A tour with Andrew Jackson Jihad and Dogbreth then took place in June 2014, followed by another stint with The Hold Steady throughout July and August. The band returned to Europe for a tour with Joyce Manor and Great Cynics in November 2014. Following a spring 2015 tour of the US with Restorations and Chris Farren of Fake Problems, the band posted on Twitter that it was time to write another record.

The band released a b-sides and rarities compilation, "God's Ex-Wife (Selective Rarities 2007–2014)," on September 16, 2016, on Asian Man Records.

On January 20, 2017, Cheap Girls announced via their Facebook page that they had broken up. Ian Graham explained the band was a vehicle for exercising his worst personality tendencies, such as substance abuse and manipulating female fans, among others.

== Members ==
- Adam Aymor – lead guitar (2007–2017)
- Ben Graham – drums, backing vocals (2007–2017)
- Ian Graham – lead vocals (2007–2017), bass guitar (2007–2016), guitar (2016–2017)
- Jason Draper – bass guitar (2016–2017)

== Discography ==
=== Albums ===
- Find Me a Drink Home (2008, Quote Unquote / Bermuda Mohawk)
- My Roaring 20's (2009, Paper + Plastick)
- Giant Orange (2012, Rise Records)
- My Roaring 20's Acoustic (2013, Quote Unquote)
- BARELY ALIVE in Grand Rapids, Michigan 12/30/12 (2013, Business Casual)
- Famous Graves (2014, Xtra Mile Recordings)

=== 7" records ===
- Art of the Underground Singles Series (2009, Art of the Underground Records)
- Cheap Girls / Failures' Union Split 7" (2009, Bermuda Mohawk)
- Cheap Girls / Above Them Split 7" (2010, All in Vinyl)
- Cheap Girls / Lemuria Split 7" (2011, No Idea Records)
- Cheap Girls / Noise By Numbers Split 7" (2011, Suburban Home Records)
- "Ruby" b/w "Living Like Hell" single

=== Live Session Releases ===
- Pink Couch Sessions
- Kerosene – Track on Germs of Perfection
- Daytrotter Session
- Nervous Energies Session
- Live in the Hurley Studio

== See also ==
- List of indie rock musicians
- List of musicians in the second wave of punk rock
- List of Rise Records artists
