= Clear Heart Full Eyes =

Studio album by Craig Finn
- Released: January 24, 2012
- Recorded: July 2011 at The Mansion, Austin, TX
- Genres: Indie rock, country
- Label: Full Time Hobby
- Producer: Mike McCarthy

Craig Finn chronology
Clear Heart Full Eyes (2012)	Faith in the Future (2015)

Professional ratings
Aggregate scores
Source	Rating
Metacritic	69/100
Review scores
Source	Rating
AllMusic	4/5 stars
The A.V. Club	B+
Paste	6.4/10
Pitchfork	6.0/10
Pop 'stache	4.5/5 stars
Robert Christgau	B+
Rolling Stone	3.5/5 stars
Tiny Mix Tapes	4.5/5 stars

Clear Heart Full Eyes is the debut solo album by The Hold Steady vocalist and guitarist Craig Finn, released on January 24, 2012 on Full Time Hobby. Produced by Mike McCarthy, the album was recorded during a five-month break from The Hold Steady, with Finn noting, "I wanted to do something with a little more storytelling and a lot less volume." Upon release, the album debuted at #89 in the US.

Rolling Stone named the song "Rented Room" the 40th best song of 2012.

== Writing and composition ==
Regarding his character-based lyrics and use of specific locations in his work, Finn noted, "I think it’s a whole different world [than that of The Hold Steady], the songs seem like vignettes that are a little separate from each other. But at the same time, I can’t help... "The Wagon Wheel" comes up twice on the record, and that’s a fictitious bar I’m thinking of, and that happens in two different songs. So somehow, I still am attracted to creating these worlds, but I don’t see the characters on the solo record interacting as much."

== Track listing ==
1. "Apollo Bay" 5:46
2. "When No One's Watching" 3:46
3. "No Future" 3:44
4. "New Friend Jesus" 3:10
5. "Jackson" 3:18
6. "Terrified Eyes" 4:47
7. "Western Pier" 3:52
8. "Honolulu Blues" 4:15
9. "Rented Room" 4:36
10. "Balcony" 3:13
11. "Not Much Left Of Us" 4:12

== Personnel ==
Musicians

- Craig Finn - vocals, guitar
- Josh Block - drums, percussion
- Jesse Ebaugh - bass guitar, upright bass, bass six, organ
- Ricky Ray Jackson - guitars, pedal steel
- Billy White - guitars, bass six
- Catherine Davis - piano, organ, keyboards
- Katie Holmes - fiddle
- Hope Irish - backing vocals
- Will Johnson - backing vocals

Recording

- Mike McCarthy - producer
- Jim Vollentine - additional engineering
- Matthew Smith - assistant engineer
- Greg Calbi - mastering

Artwork

- Christian Helms - art direction, design
- Erick Montes - art direction, design
- Susan Helms - cover textile art
- Andrew Yates - photography
- Don Weir - photography
