= Dripfield =

Studio album by Goose
- Released: June 24, 2022
- Studio: Isokon, Woodstock, New York, US
- Genre: Indie rock; jam band
- Length: 59:33
- Label: No Coincidence
- Producer: D. James Goodwin

Goose chronology
Shenanigans Nite Club (2021)	Dripfield (2022)	Undecided (2022)

Singles from Dripfield
- 1. "Borne" Released: January 18, 2022; 2. "Dripfield" Released: February 22, 2022; 3. "Hungersite" Released: April 5, 2022; 4. "Arrow" Released: May 17, 2022

"Clearly, the live thing is the main event at this point, but we love recording and want to keep exploring possibilities there. My hope is that, now, it'll be a little bit more balanced. We have no intention of changing the fact that we are a live band, but we'd all love to see the albums become something that they don't typically become for jam bands."

— Guitarist and vocalist Rick Mitarotonda on Goose's approach to recording studio albums

Dripfield is the third full-length studio album by American jam rock band Goose. It was the last full-length studio album with founding drummer Ben Atkind before his departure in 2023.

== Reception ==
Dave Goodwich of Glide Magazine called the decision to meld jam band sensibilities with indie rock a "bold decision that pays off admirably thanks to its genuinely strong original material" and suggests that the band has substantial potential for future releases. Writing for No Depression, Jim Shahan noted "an eclectic range of styles and influences" that augments the band's live performances. Writing for Pitchfork, Brady Gerber scored this release a 6.7 out of 10, stating that Goose manage to avoid the pitfalls of the jam band style by allowing the songs time to grow, resulting in "the rare jam studio album that doesn't have to be heard live to be understood", but he criticizes that "each song could benefit from some actual hooks and could be cut down a verse or two".

== Track listing ==
1. "Borne" – 5:00
2. "Hungersite" – 7:06
3. "Dripfield" – 7:04
4. "Slow Ready" – 5:06
5. "The Whales" – 6:32
6. "Arrow" – 5:51
7. "Hot Tea" – 7:14
8. "Moonrise" – 2:28
9. "Honeybee" – 6:03
10. "726" – 7:09

== Personnel ==
Goose

- Peter Anspach – acoustic guitar, electric guitar, piano, organ, electric piano, synthesizer, clavinet, vocals, photography
- Jeffrey Arevalo – bongos, shaker, cowbell, drums, upright bass, vocals
- Ben Atkind – drums, percussion
- Rick Mitarotonda – acoustic guitar, electric guitar, vocals
- Trevor Weekz – bass guitar

Additional personnel

- Stuart Bogie – horns
- D. James Goodwin – electric guitar, synthesizer, engineering, mixing, production, mastering
- Nokolaos Schizas – artwork

== See also ==
- Lists of 2022 albums
