= Craig Finn =

American singer-songwriter and musician

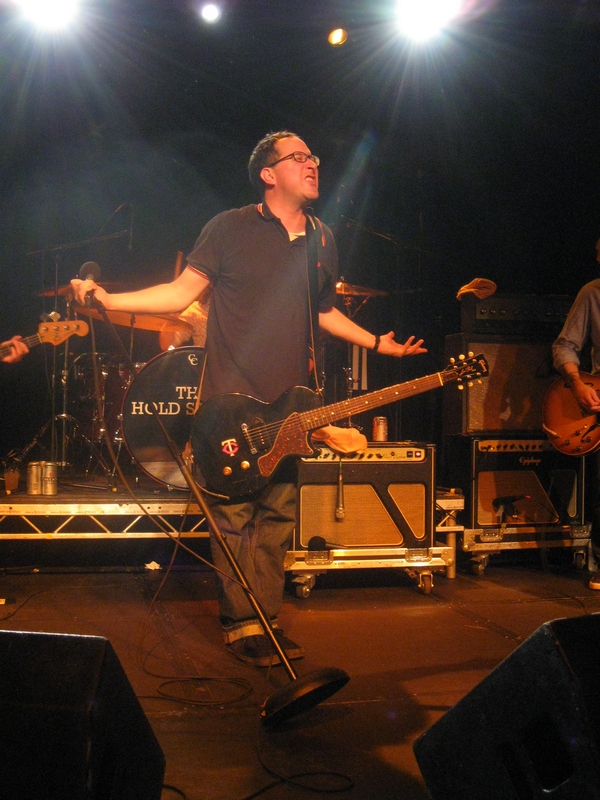
- Craig Finn with the Hold Steady in Cambridge, UK, in 2011

Background information
- Born: August 22, 1971 (age 55)
- Origin: Minneapolis, Minnesota, U.S
- Genres: Post-punk revival; alternative rock; indie rock
- Instruments: Guitar; vocals
- Years active: 1993–present
- Labels: Vagrant; Full Time Hobby; Frenchkiss; Partisan; Thirty Tigers

Craig A. Finn (born August 22, 1971) is an American singer, songwriter and musician. He is best known as the frontman of the American indie rock band the Hold Steady, with whom he has recorded nine studio albums. Prior to forming the Hold Steady, Finn was the frontman of Lifter Puller.

Described by Pitchfork as "a born storyteller who's chosen rock as his medium," Finn has released six solo albums: Clear Heart Full Eyes (2012), Faith in the Future (2015), We All Want the Same Things (2017), I Need a New War (2019), A Legacy of Rentals (2022) and Always Been (2025).

In 2022, Finn began hosting his own podcast, That's How I Remember It, released through the Talkhouse Network. The podcast examines the relationship between memory and creativity through interviews with other musicians and artists. Finn began hosting a second podcast, Summer Album/Winter Album, in 2025.

== Early life ==
Born in Boston, Finn grew up in Edina, Minnesota. He was raised a Catholic. Finn attended Valley View Middle School and graduated from Breck School. In 1993 he earned a bachelor's from Boston College. Before moving to New York City in 2000, Finn was a financial broker for American Express Financial Advisors in Minneapolis. After moving to New York City, Finn got a job at a live music webcasting company called Digital Club Network. After the move to New York, Finn did not play music for two years until forming the Hold Steady.

== Musical career ==
=== With Lifter Puller ===
In Minneapolis, Finn was a member of the band Lifter Puller from 1994 to 2000. The band included Tad Kubler, who later joined Finn in the Hold Steady. The band released three albums, two compilations, an EP and a number of singles. In 2009 the material was re-issued digitally supported by a book: Lifter Puller vs. the End Of. The re-releases included live material and the compilation Slip Backwards.

=== With the Brokerdealer ===
Finn had a short stint of work with Mr. Projectile after moving to New York City in the fall of 2001. The result of was two EP's, Untitled EP 1 and Untitled EP 2

=== With the Hold Steady ===
Finn moved to New York City in the fall of 2001, after Lifter Puller broke up, for a change and because he and his wife knew people there. He has said that with the Hold Steady, he's been trying to produce a more positive, coherent, story-based message in a natural way that he could imagine someone saying.

=== Work with other artists ===
Craig Finn provided his voice to Titus Andronicus's second album, The Monitor. He is the voice of Walt Whitman at the very end of their song "A Pot in Which to Piss" .

He worked with Minneapolis rapper P.O.S on the song "Safety In Speed (Heavy Metal)" which was released on the 2006 album Audition. Always close to the Twin Cities music scene, he also contributed to Minnesota musician Mark Mallman's song "You're Never Alone in New York" on the 2009 album Invincible Criminal.

In 2010 he co-wrote, with Chris Cheney, the title track from the Living End's 2011 album, The Ending Is Just The Beginning Repeating, while Cheney was in New York City. After working together, Cheney called Finn "a hell of a lyricist".

In 2011, Finn performs lead vocals for a Minnesota Twins tribute song "Don't Call Them Twinkies" on the Baseball Project's second album Volume 2: High and Inside.

In 2012, he sang backup on the title track for Joe Pug's album, The Great Despiser.

On April 8, 2014, Cheap Girls premiered the song "Man In Question" from their Famous Graves album. The track features Finn on guest vocals.

On February 22, 2016, Craig released a split single with Titus Andronicus named "No Faith / No Future / No Problem". On this split, Titus Andronicus covers Craig's "No Future" from his debut solo album, Clear Heart Full Eyes, and Craig Finn covers Titus Andronicus's "No Future" from their debut album, The Airing Of Grievances.

=== Solo ===
Finn's first solo album, recorded in Austin, Texas, entitled Clear Heart Full Eyes, was released January 24, 2012 through Vagrant Records. A second solo album, Faith in the Future, was released in 2015. Following Faith in the Future, Craig Finn released the Newmyer's Roof EP featuring the title track "Newmyer's Roof" and six songs that were not on Faith in the Future. The EP was originally made available in June 2015 as a pre-order download via PledgeMusic, but was given a full release on March 4, 2016, via Partisan Records.

In December, 2016, Finn released "Preludes", the first single from his next album, titled We All Want the Same Things, which was released via Partisan Records on March 24, 2017.

On January 30, 2019, Partisan Records announced the April 26 release of Finn's fourth album, I Need A New War, and released the first song from the album, "Blankets".

On May 20, 2022, A Legacy of Rentals was released on Positive Jams/Thirty Tigers.

On April 4, 2025, Finn released his sixth solo studio album, Always Been, produced by the War on Drugs frontman Adam Granduciel. The album features Granduciel and the War on Drugs appearing throughout as Finn's backing band. In December 2025 The Economist named Always Been as one of their top 10 albums of 2025, describing it as "an overlooked gem of sophisticated songwriting."

== Lyrical style ==
Finn is most notable for his third-person narrative lyrical style, wherein he frequently makes reference to literature, pop culture, adolescence, partying, religion, and drugs. Both with Lifter Puller and The Hold Steady, Finn's songs often follow a storytelling format that features recurring characters and locations with Ybor City, Florida, and the Twin Cities having special prominence.

Particularly in later Hold Steady albums, Finn's songs have explored the darker aspects of his characters' party-centric lifestyles. Finn told an interviewer in 2012: "Artistically, I have always been really interested in the hangover; not just the celebration and the confetti but also the puke in the gutter." Finn has said that "irony is certainly not something I want to be accused of," instead hoping to bring "honesty and sincerity" through his songwriting. Although his stories involve violence and heavy drug use, Finn states his songwriting is not very personal or "confessional".

Finn's lyrics have been a frequent point of praise for The Hold Steady with Uncut Magazine describing his style as "narratives driven less by the wordy exposition of yore than acute observation, devastating detail, by turns exclamatory, epigrammatic and grainily authentic."

In a review of A Legacy of Rentals (2022), veteran critic Robert Christgau describes Finn's albums as an "ongoing series of musical short stories" in which "not everybody loses... but for sure nobody wins", noting the preponderance of protagonists who are very likely nonvoting "all-white casualties of finance capital and the fossil fuel cartel".

== Influences ==
Finn has indicated that some of his greatest lyrical influences include Blake Schwarzenbach from Jets to Brazil and Jawbreaker as well as Bruce Springsteen. In a Guardian article he described The Replacements' Let It Be as his "favorite ever record." He's also a big fan of Rick Danko of The Band. In an interview with GQ, Finn discussed his love for Danko: "People roll their eyes about his solo records, but I'm just happy to have more songs that I can listen to him sing; his voice is incredible... I would listen to him sing the phone book."

He is also a fan of Drive-By Truckers.

== Personal life ==
As of 2016, Finn lived in Greenpoint, Brooklyn, with his girlfriend; they began dating in 2006.

== Discography ==
Studio albums

- Clear Heart Full Eyes (2012)
- Faith in the Future (2015)
- We All Want the Same Things (2017)
- I Need a New War (2019)
- A Legacy of Rentals (2022)
- Always Been (2025)

Compilations

- All These Perfect Crosses (2020)
