= I Need a New War =

Studio album by Craig Finn
- Released: April 26, 2019
- Venues: The Isokon, Woodstock, NY
- Genre: Indie rock
- Length: 44:39
- Label: Partisan
- Producer: Josh Kaufman

Craig Finn chronology
We All Want the Same Things (2017)	I Need a New War (2019)	A Legacy of Rentals (2022)

Professional ratings
Aggregate scores
Source	Rating
Metacritic	79/100
Review scores
Source	Rating
AllMusic	4/5 stars
American Songwriter	4.5/5 stars
Pitchfork	8/10
Rolling Stone	4/5 stars

I Need a New War is the fourth studio album by Craig Finn. It was released on Partisan Records on April 26, 2019.

The title comes from the song "Grant at Galena". Following 2015's Faith in the Future and 2017's We All Want the Same Things, I Need a New War completes what Finn has called a trilogy. Each of which tells the stories and observations of what Finn calls "unremarkable people." "These three records are really about the same kind of people," Finn said. "They're smaller, more realistic, more everyday, and more reflective of the people I see around me as I travel." I Need a New War zeroes in on middle-class professionals slogging through office jobs or mothers and fathers overcome with unsexy middle-aged ennui. "These are people who are trying to keep their heads above water, who maybe felt like they've done everything they were told to do, and still aren't making it," Craig Finn says. "They aren't going to morph into superheroes. They aren't going to save the day, but they're trying. They have their own mundane struggles, but struggles nonetheless."

== Critical reception ==
At Metacritic, which assigns a weighted average score out of 100 to reviews from mainstream critics, the album received an average score of 79 based on 17 reviews, indicating "generally favorable reviews".

== Track listing ==
All songs written by Craig Finn

No.	Title	Length
1.	"Blankets"	4:10
2.	"Magic Marker"	3:49
3.	"A Bathtub in the Kitchen"	4:39
4.	"Indications"	4:52
5.	"Grant at Galena"	5:43
6.	"Something to Hope For"	4:45
7.	"Carmen Isn't Coming In Today"	3:53
8.	"Holyoke"	3:33
9.	"Her With the Blues"	4:58
10.	"Anne Marie & Shane"	4:17
Total length:		44:39
