= Everything Must Go (Goose album) =

Studio album by Goose
- Released: April 25, 2025
- Genre: Indie rock
- Length: 1:30:20
- Label: No Coincidence
- Producer: D. James Goodwin

Goose chronology
Undecided (2022)	Everything Must Go (2025)	Chain Yer Dragon (2025)

Singles from Everything Must Go
- 1. "Give It Time" Released: January 27, 2025; 2. "Lead Up" Released: February 25, 2025; 3. "Your Direction" Released: March 28, 2025; 4. "Thatch" Released: April 7, 2025

Everything Must Go is the fourth full-length studio album by American jam rock band Goose. It was the first full-length studio album with new drummer Cotter Ellis.

== Background ==
Recording for Everything Must Go began in May 2023., when the band's lineup included the now-departed Ben Atkind on drums and Jeffrey Arevalo on percussion. According to keyboardist Peter Anspach, the album was recorded half with Atkind and half with new drummer Cotter Ellis. Most of the tracks on the album had been performed live several times, and in some cases for years, by the band prior to the album's release. The exceptions include "Your Direction," which was released as the third single, and two tracks -- "Dustin Hoffman" and "Iguana Song"—which had no prior live versions before the album's release.

On January 27, 2025, "Give It Time" was released as the first single. Subsequent singles included "Lead Up," "Your Direction," and "Thatch."

== Reception ==
Everything Must Go currently holds a 77 rating on Metacritic, indicating "generally favorable reviews". Dave Goodwich of Glide offered a positive review, calling the album "the group's most comprehensive and gratifying studio release to date". Writing for Rolling Stone, David Browne gave the album a 3/5 rating, comparing—and contrasting—the band with jam band predecessors such as the Grateful Dead

== Track listing ==
Everything Must Go track listing
No.	Title	Length
1.	"Everything Must Go"	5:55
2.	"Give It Time"	6:46
3.	"Dustin Hoffman"	6:58
4.	"Your Direction"	4:57
5.	"Thatch"	6:40
6.	"Lead Up"	5:19
7.	"Animal"	7:47
8.	"Red Bird"	6:14
9.	"Atlas Dogs"	5:26
10.	"California Magic"	6:01
11.	"Feel It Now"	6:42
12.	"Iguana Song"	7:48
13.	"Silver Rising"	8:52
14.	"How It Ends"	5:01
Total length:		1:30:20

== Personnel ==
Goose

- Peter Anspach – keyboards, guitar, synthesizer, vocals
- Jeffrey Arevalo – drums, percussion, vocals
- Ben Atkind – drums
- Cotter Ellis – drums, percussion, vocals
- Rick Mitarotonda – guitar, vocals
- Trevor Weekz – bass guitar, vocals

Additional personnel

- Brian Blomerth – artwork
- Stuart Bogie – saxophone, flute
- Matt Campbell – synthesizer, vocals
- D. James Goodwin – guitar, synthesizer, engineering, mixing, production, mastering
- Andrew McGovern – trumpet
- Dave Nelson – trombone
- Gillian Pelkonen – engineering
- Will Thresher – art direction
- Heather Woods Broderick – cello

== See also ==
- List of 2025 albums
