= Giant Orange =

Studio album by Cheap Girls
- Released: February 21, 2012
- Recorded: 2011
- Genre: Power pop Indie rock Punk rock Pop punk
- Length: 34:25
- Label: Rise Records
- Producer: Laura Jane Grace

Cheap Girls chronology
My Roaring 20's (2009)	Giant Orange (2012)	My Roaring 20's Acoustic (2013)

Giant Orange is the third studio album by rock group Cheap Girls, released on February 21, 2012. It was the first release for the band after signing with Rise Records and is available on CD, vinyl and as a digital download. The album was produced by Laura Jane Grace of American punk rock band Against Me! and was the first time the band worked with a producer. With the exception of tambourine, the album was recorded using only guitar, bass, drums and vocals. The track "Gone All Summer" is the introduction music on Kyle Kinane's "Whiskey Icarus" stand-up comedy special released on CD and DVD.

== Recording ==
Recording for the album began on October 11, 2011, at Total Treble Studio in Elkton, Florida. It was the first album recorded at the studio, which was converted from an old post office.

== Release ==
The album was released on February 21, 2012. It debuted at number 49 on the Billboard Heatseekers Albums chart.

== Singles ==
"Ruby" was released for digital download on January 3, 2012, as the first single from the album.

== Critical reception ==
Professional ratings
Aggregate scores
Source	Rating
Metacritic	70/100
Review scores
Source	Rating
AbsolutePunk	7/10
AllMusic	3.5/5 stars
Alter The Press!	link
Punknews.org	link

Giant Orange received generally positive reviews from music critics. At Metacritic, which assigns a weighted average out of 100 to reviews from mainstream critics, the album has received an average score of 70, based on 6 reviews, indicating "generally favorable" feedback. Chrysta Cherrie of AllMusic rated the album three and a half out of five stars, writing that "its bold catchiness will keep listeners engaged, from the major chord melody and mid-'90s Merge Records grit of opener "Gone All Summer," to the ringing guitar and back-and-forth harmonies of "Mercy-Go-Round."

== Track listing ==
Standard edition
No.	Title	Length
1.	"Gone All Summer"	4:02
2.	"Ruby"	3:39
3.	"Communication Blues"	3:20
4.	"Cored to Empty"	2:49
5.	"Manhattan on Mute"	3:35
6.	"Mercy-Go-'Round"	3:14
7.	"If You Can't Swim"	2:03
8.	"On/Off Switches"	3:00
9.	"Pacer"	4:53
10.	"Right Way"	3:46
Total length:		34:25

== Chart performance ==
Chart	Peak position
US Heatseekers Albums (Billboard)	49

== Personnel ==
Credits are adapted from AllMusic

Major credits

- Cheap Girls – Arranger, Primary Artist

Production credits

- Laura Jane Grace – Producer
- Robert Halstead – Engineer
- Mike Zirkel – Mastering, Mixing

Music credits

- Ben Graham — Drums, Percussion, Vocals
- Ian Graham — Bass, Composer, Cover Photo, Guitar (Acoustic), Vocals
- Adam Aymor — Guitars

Misc credits

- Scott Bell — Assistant
- Tony Godino — Assistant
- Salmon Nason — Technical Assistance
- Heather Gabel — Art Direction
- Jeff Rosenstock — Layout
- Ryan Russell — Band Photo
- Chris Trovero — Management
