= Eyes on the Lines =

Studio album by Steve Gunn
- Released: June 3, 2016
- Length: 41:13
- Label: Matador

Steve Gunn chronology
Seasonal Hire (2015)	Eyes on the Lines (2016)	The Unseen in Between (2019)

Singles from Eyes on the Lines
- 1. "Ancient Jules" Released: May 11, 2016

Professional ratings
Aggregate scores
Source	Rating
Metacritic	83/100
Review scores
Source	Rating
AllMusic	4/5 stars
Blurt	5/5 stars
Consequence of Sound	B
Drowned in Sound	7/10
Exclaim!	7/10
Paste	8/10
Pitchfork	8/10

Eyes on the Lines is the third studio album by American singer-songwriter Steve Gunn. It was released on June 3, 2016 under Matador Records.

== Critical reception ==
Eyes on the Lines was met with universal acclaim reviews from critics. At Metacritic, which assigns a weighted average rating out of 100 to reviews from mainstream publications, this release received an average score of 83, based on 21 reviews.

=== Accolades ===
Publication	Accolade	Rank	Ref.
BrooklynVegan	Top 45 Albums of 2016	42	
Mojo	Top 50 Albums of 2016	41	
Piccadilly Records	Top 100 Albums of 2016	69	
The Wire	Top 50 Albums of 2016	27	
Uncut	Top 75 Albums of 2016	67	
Under the Radar	Top 100 Albums of 2016	97	

== Track listing ==
Eyes on the Lines track listing
No.	Title	Length
1.	"Ancient Jules"	6:00
2.	"Full Moon Tide"	4:48
3.	"The Drop"	4:45
4.	"Conditions Wild"	4:36
5.	"Nature Driver"	4:00
6.	"Heavy Sails"	4:01
7.	"Night Wander"	4:18
8.	"Park Bench Smile"	3:24
9.	"Ark"	5:21

== Charts ==
Chart performance for Eyes on the Lines
Chart	Peak position
Belgian Albums (Ultratop Flanders)	30
Dutch Albums (Album Top 100)	153
US Americana/Folk Albums (Billboard)	15
US Heatseekers Albums (Billboard)	13
