= Famous Graves =

Studio album by Cheap Girls
- Released: May 13, 2014
- Recorded: 2013
- Genre: Power pop Indie rock Punk rock Pop punk
- Length: 35:38
- Label: Xtra Mile
- Producer: Cheap Girls

Cheap Girls chronology
BARELY ALIVE in Grand Rapids, Michigan 12/30/12 (2013)	Famous Graves (2014)

Famous Graves is the fourth and final full-length studio album by rock group Cheap Girls, released on May 12, 2014, in the United Kingdom and on May 13, 2014, in the United States through Xtra Mile Recordings. It is available on CD, vinyl and as a digital download. The album was recorded over three months in Chicago, Illinois and Grand Rapids, Michigan with Rick Johnson and Jeff Dean. It was self-produced by the band and mixed with the help of Dean.

== Recording ==
On February 19, 2013, the band posted a picture on their Facebook page from a studio in Grand Rapids, MI stating it was "day one" of demoing for their next album.

The album was recorded in Grand Rapids, Michigan and Chicago, Illinois. Singer Ian Graham told Metro Canada that "it seemed like the right kind of environment for what we wanted to do. It’s the most amount of time we’ve ever taken (on an album).”

In an interview with BeatRoute Magazine, Ian Graham described the recording process different from previous albums in that the band "learned that it’s good to record an idea that we liked, even if we didn’t use it. We were more ambitious this time.”

The band decided to produce the album on their own. In an interview with CMJ published May 6, 2014, Ian Graham says they discussed the album with producers and liked the direction some were going, but when scheduling and location conflicts arose they ultimately decided to self-produce it. They also felt that they could then "dissect things a little more" than they did on previous albums.

== Promotion ==
In support of the album, the band toured with Against Me! and The Hold Steady in the spring of 2014. A tour with Andrew Jackson Jihad and Dogbreth then took place in June 2014, followed by another stint with The Hold Steady throughout July and August. The band returned to Europe for a tour with Joyce Manor and Great Cynics in November 2014. Following a spring 2015 tour of the US with Restorations and Chris Farren of Fake Problems, the band posted on Twitter that it was time to write another record.

== Release ==
Famous Graves was released on May 13, 2014, through Xtra Mile Recordings. It marks the band's first album on Xtra Mile and the label's first international release.

On January 15, 2014, it was announced that the band had signed to the independent UK-based label Xtra Mile Recordings for a worldwide release of the album. In a March 2014 interview with BrooklynVegan, singer Ian Graham stated: "Xtra Mile...had some really refreshing ideas as to how we could go about the release, and we really just saw eye-to-eye from the beginning."

On April 8, 2014, the band premiered the song "Man In Question" from the album. The track features guest vocals from Craig Finn of The Hold Steady.

On April 24, 2014, the band premiered the song "Amazing Grace" from the album.

On May 8, 2014, "Famous Graves" was made available for streaming online via Consequence of Sound.

== Singles ==
The first single from the album, "Knock Me Over," was released on February 19, 2014. Singer Ian Graham states the song was written "after one of my last (knee) surgeries (and is) about being frustrated from being in a lot of pain."

== Critical reception ==
Professional ratings
Aggregate scores
Source	Rating
Metacritic	61/100
Review scores
Source	Rating
Alternative Press	3/5 stars
Consequence of Sound	C+
The 405	6.5/10
Los Angeles Daily News	4/5 stars
The Fire Note	3.5/5 stars
PopMatters	6/10

Famous Graves received generally positive feedback from music critics. At Metacritic, which assigns a weighted average out of 100 to reviews from mainstream critics, the album has received an average score of 61, based on 5 reviews, indicating "generally favorable" feedback. At Alternative Press, Brian Kraus rated the album three stars out of five, writing how "Cheap Girls' songs blur together–hell, so do their albums–but it's something to take a deeper look at." Writing for BeatRoute Magazine, Brittany Lahure describes Famous Graves as "a love letter written to what is the core of rock and roll, an album that displays the band’s ability to create compelling textures and lyrics using their barebone instruments. The album is a music experience that any rock fan would hold close to their hearts." Matt Korman of The 405 gave the album a 6.5/10 rating, writing that "there aren't too many moments on the band's fourth studio LP that are going to reach out and steal you away," and the album "doesn't really sway from Cheap Girls' lovable comfort zone, for better or worse. Walking through a listen again and again and it's hard to say how the beginning really differs from the end." Sam Gnerre of the Los Angeles Daily News gave the album four stars out of five, calling it "one of the best rock ’n’ roll records of the year."

== Track listing ==
Standard edition with bonus track
No.	Title	Length
1.	"Slow Nod"	3:26
2.	"Short Cut Days"	3:47
3.	"Knock Me Over"	3:31
4.	"Amazing Grace"	1:57
5.	"Pure Hate"	3:54
6.	"Man In Question"	3:18
7.	"Second Floor"	2:27
8.	"Splintered"	3:14
9.	"Thought Senseless"	4:03
10.	"Turns"	3:02
11.	"7-8 Years (Bonus Track)"	2:59
Total length:		35:38

== Release history ==
Region	Date	Format(s)	Label
United States	May 13, 2014	CD; Digital download; Vinyl	Xtra Mile Recordings
United Kingdom	May 12, 2014	CD; Digital download; Vinyl	Xtra Mile Recordings

== Credits ==
Credits are adapted from AllMusic.

Major credits

- Cheap Girls – Arranger, Primary Artist, Producer
- Rick Johnson – Bass, Engineer, Organ, Synthesizer

Production credits

- Jeff Dean – Engineer, Mixing
- Jon Drew – Mastering

Music credits

- Ben Graham — Drums, Group Member, Percussion, Vocals
- Ian Graham — Bass, Composer, Group Member, Guitar, Vocals
- Adam Aymor — Group Member, Guitar
- Craig Finn — Vocals

Misc credits

- Jeff Rosenstock — Artwork
