= More Photographs (A Continuum) =

Compilation album by Kevin Morby
- Released: May 26, 2023
- Length: 41:52
- Label: Dead Oceans
- Producer: Sam Cohen

Kevin Morby chronology
Music from Montana Story (2023)	More Photographs (A Continuum) (2023)	Little Wide Open (2026)

More Photographs (A Continuum) is a compilation album by American indie rock musician Kevin Morby, released on May 26, 2023, on Dead Oceans. It is billed as a companion piece to Morby's 2022 album This Is a Photograph. It includes new versions of several songs from This Is a Photograph, as well as some previously unreleased material.

Mike Lesuer of Flood Magazine called it "less of a B-sides collection and more of an alternate A-sides record dipping into intimately familiar lyrics and/or melodies." According to Morby, the song "Triumph" was written about "the tragic passing of Chris Bell from Big Star, who in December of 1978 crashed his Triumph TR7 sports car into a light pole and passed away at age 27."

== Track listing ==
All music is composed by Kevin Morby.

No.	Title	Length
1.	"This Is a Photograph II"	2:56
2.	"Triumph"	4:13
3.	"Bittersweet, Tennessee"	6:14
4.	"Going to Prom"	3:35
5.	"Lion Tamer"	4:38
6.	"A Song for Katie"	4:42
7.	"Five Easy Pieces Revisited"	3:49
8.	"Mickey Mantle's Autograph"	5:49
9.	"Kingdom of Broken Hearts"	5:53
Total length:		41:52
