= Find Me a Drink Home =

Studio album by Cheap Girls
- Released: April 22, 2008
- Recorded: January – February 2008
- Genre: Power pop Indie rock Punk rock Pop punk
- Length: 32:54
- Label: Quote Unquote Records, Bermuda Mohawk, Asian Man Records
- Producer: Rick Johnson, Cheap Girls

Cheap Girls chronology
Find Me a Drink Home (2008)	My Roaring 20's (2009)

Professional ratings
Review scores
Source	Rating
Punknews.org	link

Find Me a Drink Home is the first studio album by rock group Cheap Girls. It was released on April 22, 2008, on Bermuda Mohawk Records. Los Diaper Records released it on vinyl in May 2008 and Quote Unquote Records released it digitally on July 11, 2008. The album was produced by Rick Johnson and Cheap Girls. Johnson also engineered, mixed and played keys on the album. In the album notes bass player and lyricist Ian Graham is credited with the writing of the lyrics.

== Recording ==
The album notes state that it was recorded in a Custer, Michigan cabin in January and February 2008. It was mastered by Derron Nuhfer at Sarlacc Mastering in Gainesville, Florida.

== Release ==
The album was released on April 22, 2008, on Bermuda Mohawk Records. On August 2, 2012, it was announced that future pressings of Find Me a Drink Home would be released by Asian Man Records.

== Track listing ==
Standard edition
No.	Title	Length
1.	"Kind of on Purpose"	3:44
2.	"No One To Blame"	3:18
3.	"27 Days"	3:24
4.	"Stop Now"	3:08
5.	"Stay High (Magic)"	1:47
6.	"A Lesser Rate"	3:48
7.	"Parking Lot"	2:54
8.	"I Should Never"	1:48
9.	"Kill Your Mood"	3:10
10.	"Her & Cigarettes"	1:36
11.	"Through To Me"	4:11
Total length:		32:48

== Credits ==
Credits are adapted from AllMusic.

Major credits

- Cheap Girls – Composer, Primary Artist
- Rick Johnson – Engineer, Keyboards, Mastering, Mixing, Producer

Music credits

- Ben Graham — Drums, Vocals (Background)
- Ian Graham — Bass, Composer, Cover Photo, Guitar (Acoustic), Lyricist, Vocals
- Adam Aymor — Guitar

Misc credits

- Scott Bell — Band Photo
- Jeff Rosenstock — Design, Layout
