= Harlem River (album) =

Studio album by Kevin Morby
- Released: November 26, 2013
- Genre: Folk rock
- Length: 42:05
- Label: Woodsist
- Producer: Rob Barbato

Kevin Morby chronology
Harlem River (2013)	Still Life (2014)

Harlem River is the debut studio album by the American indie rock musician Kevin Morby. It is an homage to Morby's time living in New York City and was recorded after he moved to Los Angeles. The album was released on November 26, 2013 by Woodsist Records and received positive reviews from critics.

== Background and composition ==
Kevin Morby moved to New York City when he was 17. While living there, he played bass for Woods and formed the Babies with Cassie Ramone. He eventually left New York and moved to Los Angeles, where he began recording Harlem River. The songs on the album were written from 2007 to 2012, encompassing his time living in New York and Los Angeles.

Harlem River is an homage to Morby's time living in New York City, although most of its lyrics do not overtly reference any sites in the city. Critics noted that the album had a vintage sound and compared Morby's style to artists such as Bob Dylan and Lou Reed. Morby cited the albums Highway 61 Revisited, The Velvet Underground and Nico, and Jandek's You Walk Alone as influences on Harlem River. Harlem River contains different guitars and organ in its instrumentation. The opening track, "Miles, Miles, Miles", has the narrator tell the listener "If you knew just how far I traveled" and features female backing vocals. "Harlem River" is a nine minute track and is what Maura McAndrew describes as a "circuitous jam" with dreamlike bass and drums. Its lyrics have the narrator addressing the Harlem River directly. "Reign" contains what Robby Ritacco described as a rockabilly guitar and is lyrically about murder. Morby wrote "Reign" when he was 19 and was inspired to write it after a dream he had about the song. "Slow Train" features Cate Le Bon on guest vocals; Morby met her at a party in Los Angeles and invited her to contribute to the album. "Sucker in the Void" alludes to "a feeling of no return".

== Release and reception ==
Professional ratings
Aggregate scores
Source	Rating
Metacritic	77/100
Review scores
Source	Rating
AllMusic	4/5 stars
Filter Magazine	84%
The Line of Best Fit	6.5/10
Pitchfork	7.0/10
Tiny Mix Tapes	3.5/5 marks

Harlem River was released on November 26, 2013. Morby went on tour with Le Bon in support of the album. A video for the track "Harlem River" was released on January 23, 2014.

According to the review aggregator Metacritic, Harlem River received "generally favorable reviews" based on a weighted average score of 77 out of 100 from 6 critic scores. Timothy Monger of AllMusic wrote that "Harlem River is a journey worth taking and an excellent debut from an emerging singer/songwriter". Maura McAndrew of Cokemachineglow considered Harlem River "an overall pleasure to listen to", but thought that most of the album did not measure up to the title track. Kyle McKinnel wrote in a Filter review that "with Harlem River, Morby shuffles forthright, his sanguine tone assuredly focused on the cathartic inertia of travel". Robby Ritacco of The Line of Best Fit felt that Harlem River had a paradoxical nature given its dark lyrics accompanied with a "serene" backing: "it acknowledges the inherent difficulties of life in the big city, if only for the sake enforcing his own stern resolution against leaving it". Jeremy Gordon wrote in a Pitchfork review that "Morby largely succeeds at taking us on his journey, imploring that the big 'Where am I going?' question isn't so daunting so long as you keep collecting suggestions". Caroline Rayner wrote in a Tiny Mix Tapes review that Harlem River served as "snapshots, not stories" of Morby's life in New York and that he "got me [Rayner] wishing that I kept better track of my time in New York, wishing that I wrote something down about every day I’ve been here and took pictures of everyone I know".

== Track listing ==
All tracks are written by Kevin Morby.

No.	Title	Length
1.	"Miles, Miles, Miles"	4:49
2.	"Wild Side (Oh, the Places You'll Go)"	5:40
3.	"Harlem River"	9:15
4.	"If You Leave, and If You Marry"	3:40
5.	"Slow Train" (feat. Cate Le Bon)	5:50
6.	"Reign"	4:09
7.	"Sucker in the Void (The Lone Mile)"	4:03
8.	"The Dead They Don't Come Back"	4:39
Total length:		42:05

== Personnel ==
Credits adapted from the album's liner notes.

Musicians

- Kevin Morby – vocals, guitar
- Justin Sullivan – drums, percussion
- Dan Iead – guitar (track 2), slide guitar (8)
- Will Canzoneri – bass (5), guitar and organ (3), glockenspiel (7),
- Tim Presley – bass (1), harmonica (6)

Additional musicians

- Cate Le Bon – guest vocals on "Slow Train"

Production and artwork

- Rob Barbato – producer, engineer, bass (2, 3), chord organ (4), backing vocals (7), guitar (1, 6)
- Drew Fisher – engineer
- John Greenham – mastering
- Huw Evans – layout
- Joyce George – cover photography
