= Steve Gunn (musician) =

American singer-songwriter (born 1977)

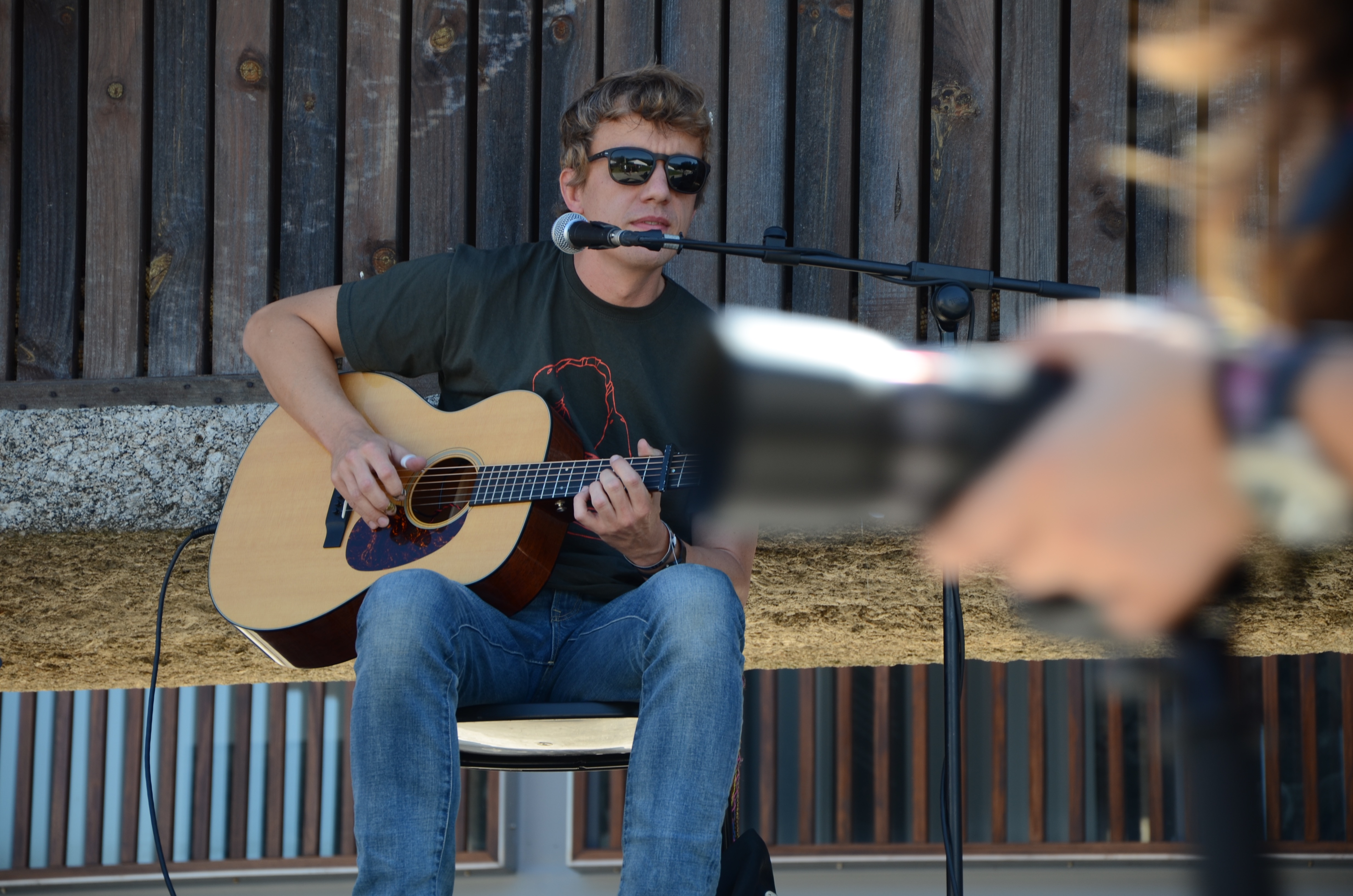

Background information
- Born: April 20, 1977 (age 49); Lansdowne, Pennsylvania, U.S.
- Origin: Brooklyn, New York, U.S.
- Occupation: Singer-songwriter
- Instrument: Guitar
- Years active: 2007–present
- Labels: Matador, Onomato, Digitalis Recordings, Three Lobed, Meudiademorte, Paradise of Bachelors

Steve Gunn (born April 20, 1977, in Lansdowne, Pennsylvania, United States) is an American singer-songwriter based in Brooklyn.

== Biography ==
He studied art and music at Temple University before moving to New York City. Gunn was formerly a guitarist in Kurt Vile's backing band, The Violators.

Gunn has stated that his musical influences include Michael Chapman, La Monte Young, Indian music, John Fahey, Jack Rose, Robbie Basho, and Sandy Bull.

In July 2021 he performed as a solo act at the Newport Folk Festival.

Gunn's album Other You (Matador, 2021) comprises 11 tracks all written by himself, among them an instrumental duet with harpist Mary Lattimore. Reviewing the album for Aquarium Drunkard, Tyler Wilcox stated: "However dreamy it gets, you stay wide awake throughout."

== Discography ==
=== Albums ===
- Steve Gunn (2007)
- Sundowner (2008)
- Boerum Palace (2009)
- End of the City (2009) (split with Shawn David McMillen)
- Camel Throat (2010)
- Sand City (2010) (with John Truscinski)
- Live at the Night Light (2011)
- Ocean Parkway (2012) (with John Truscinski)
- Golden Gunn (2013) (with Hiss Golden Messenger)
- Time Off (2013)
- Cantos De Lisboa (2014) (with Mike Cooper)
- Melodies for a Savage Fix (2014) (with Mike Gangloff)
- Way Out Weather (2014)
- Seasonal Hire (2015) (with The Black Twig Pickers)
- Steve Gunn/Kurt Vile (2015)(with Kurt Vile)
- Eyes on the Lines (2016)
- Bay Head (2017) (with John Truscinski)
- The Unseen in Between (2019)
- "Flops in New York" (2019) (with Ryley Walker and Ryan Jewell)
- Soundkeeper (2020) (with John Truscinski)
- Other You (2021)
- Music For Writers (2025)
- Daylight Daylight (2025)

=== EPs ===
- Too Early for the Hammer (2009)
- Livin' in Between (2020)
- Nakama (2022)

=== Singles ===
- "Human Condition" b/w "Trances" (2011)
- "Decline of the Stiff" (2011)
- "Lonesome Valley" (2013) (with Black Twig Pickers)
- "Wildwood" (2014)
