= Little Wide Open =

Studio album by Kevin Morby
- Released: May 15, 2026
- Length: 59:16
- Label: Dead Oceans
- Producer: Aaron Dessner

Kevin Morby chronology
More Photographs (A Continuum) (2023)	Little Wide Open (2026)

Singles from Little Wide Open
- 1. "Javelin" Released: February 11, 2026; 2. "Die Young" Released: March 11, 2026; 3. "Badlands" Released: April 16, 2026

Little Wide Open is the eighth studio album by American indie rock musician Kevin Morby, released on May 15, 2026, on Dead Oceans.

== Background ==
Aaron Dessner asked Morby to support his band The National on July 4, 2024, at their outdoor London show at Crystal Palace Bowl. Shortly after, Dessner contacted Morby to let him know he would be interested in producing his next album. In early 2025, the pair began recording Morby's eighth studio album at Dessner's Long Pond Studio, a secluded, rustic cabin in the Hudson Valley, New York. The pair finished recording in September 2025.

The album's lyrics were influenced by Morby's life in the Midwest: "There’s something unintentionally musical about the Midwest; cicadas chirping in the trees, a train passing, a tornado siren going off. If you listen, there are these almost ominous sounds taking place beneath the wide-open sky —its ugliness and its beauty and how the two are often working together simultaneously. And while the Midwest isn’t technically the badlands, it’s my badlands."

== Release and promotion ==
Little Wide Open was announced on February 11, 2026, alongside the release of its first single "Javelin". A tour of North America and Europe in support of the album was also announced. A music video for "Javelin" was released the same day and stars Morby with his friend, comedian Caleb Hearon, riding an ATV through Missouri backroads and fields, with cameos from Katie Crutchfield and Tara Raghuveer. "Die Young" was released as the second single on March 11, 2026. It was accompanied by a music video directed by Morby with Zak Gorsuch and Chantal Anderson, which stars Morby wearing a fringed American flag jacket and wandering through a field of sunflowers, and was shot during the magic hour. A third single, "Badlands", was released on April 16, 2026. Morby performed "Javelin" on Jimmy Kimmel Live! on April 28, 2026. The album was officially released on May 15, 2026. A music video for "100,000" was released the same day.

== Critical reception ==
Professional ratings
Aggregate scores
Source	Rating
Metacritic	86/100
Review scores
Source	Rating
Beats Per Minute	85%
DIY	4/5 stars
The Guardian	4/5 stars
Mojo	4/5 stars
Paste	A−
Pitchfork	8.0/10
Record Collector	4/5 stars
Sputnikmusic	4.5/5
Uncut	8/10
Under the Radar	8/10

Little Wide Open was met with critical acclaim. At Metacritic, which assigns a normalized rating out of 100 to reviews from professional publications, the album received an average score of 86, based on 13 reviews.

Grant Sharples of Paste gave the album an A− rating, writing, "With Little Wide Open, Morby has crafted something eternal, something that encapsulates the Midwest in all its rugged glory. It may just be his true masterpiece." Will Hermes of Pitchfork wrote, "Little Wide Open is the most cohesive, tuneful and cleanly drawn album of Morby's career." Tom Doyle of Mojo wrote that the title track was "arguably Morby's greatest song to date", concluding, "Altogether, Little Wide Open is a creative high water mark." DIY wrote that, together with Dessner, Morby "crafted perhaps the most vivid and essential record of his career". PopMatters gave the album a 9 out of 10 rating and assessed it to be Morby's "most direct, understated, and poetic work to date": Ultimately, Little Wide Open is a masterpiece of simple and, at times, epic proportions that will linger deep within one's soul." Uncut's Sharon O'Connell concluded, "These 13 richly expansive, tender-hearted songs also map the in-between places, questioning what living means now, in the face of an apparent apocalypse."

Sputnikmusic gave the album a 4.5 out of 5 rating, writing, "Little Wide Open certainly isn't grandiose or over the top, but it does feel like most of his best material settled into one place here. It possesses all the marks of a year-defining folk/Americana release – and while I'll stop short of calling it an instant classic, I do think time will be kind to this album." Ljubinko Zivkovic of Beats Per Minute wrote, "From the poetic appraisal of the confounding status quo on the country hug of "Badlands", to the banjo-bolstered sigh of summer aimlessness that is "Cowtown", he consistently proves that his ear is as sharp as his tongue – and it all captures what he sees with his unique eye."

== Track listing ==
All tracks are written by Kevin Morby.

Little Wide Open track listing
No.	Title	Length
1.	"Badlands"	3:54
2.	"Die Young"	3:52
3.	"Javelin"	3:45
4.	"All Sinners"	3:50
5.	"Natural Disaster"	7:08
6.	"100,000"	5:13
7.	"Little Wide Open"	8:09
8.	"Cowtown"	3:26
9.	"Bible Belt"	4:18
10.	"I Ride Passenger"	3:50
11.	"Junebug"	3:31
12.	"Dandelion"	3:46
13.	"Field Guide for the Butterflies"	4:34
Total length:		59:16

== Personnel ==
Credits are adapted from Tidal.

- Kevin Morby – vocals (all tracks), guitar (tracks 1–9, 12, 13), banjo (10)
- Aaron Dessner – bass, production (all tracks); synthesizer (1–6, 8, 9, 11), drums (1, 8, 13), piano (3–11, 13), guitar (3–9, 11, 13), programming (4), percussion (5, 6, 9, 10, 12, 13), banjo (7, 12), tambourine (7), slide guitar (9), mandolin (10, 12)
- Steve Fallone –mastering
- Andrew Barr – drums (1–4, 7, 11–13), percussion (3)
- Jonathan Low – mixing (1, 2, 7, 12)
- Elliott Kozel – additional engineering (1, 3, 12)
- Justin Vernon – additional vocals (1), guitar (5)
- Amelia Meath – background vocals (1, 13), vocals (3)
- Mat Davidson – violin (2, 13), fiddle (7, 10, 12)
- Bella Blasko – mixing (3–6, 8–11, 13)
- Benjamin Lanz – horn (3)
- Oliver Hill – strings (5)
- Lucinda Williams – vocals (5)
- Meg Duffy – bass, guitar, percussion (6)
- Tim Carr – drums, percussion (6)
- Phil Hartunian – additional engineering (6)
- Katie Gavin – background vocals (7, 12)
- Colin Croom – pedal steel guitar (7)
- Stuart Bogie – clarinet (11)
- Tom Moth – harp (11)
- Rachel Baiman – violin (13)

== Charts ==
Chart performance for Little Wide Open
Chart (2026)	Peak position
Belgian Albums (Ultratop Flanders)	72
Belgian Albums (Ultratop Wallonia)	51
French Albums (SNEP)	113
French Rock & Metal Albums (SNEP)	4
German Albums (Offizielle Top 100)	89
New Zealand Albums (RMNZ)	27
Scottish Albums (Official Charts)	13
Swedish Physical Albums (Sverigetopplistan)	17
UK Albums Sales (OCC)	16
UK Americana Albums (Official Charts)	5
UK Independent Albums (Official Charts)	7
US Top Album Sales (Billboard)	45
