= The Unseen in Between =

Studio album by Steve Gunn
- Released: January 18, 2019
- Length: 44:22
- Label: Matador

Steve Gunn chronology
| Eyes on the Lines (2016) | The Unseen in Between (2019) |

Professional ratings
Aggregate scores
| Source | Rating |
|---|---|
| AnyDecentMusic? | 7.3/10 |
| Metacritic | 79/100 |
Review scores
| Source | Rating |
| AllMusic | 4/5 stars |
| American Songwriter | 4/5 stars |
| Chicago Tribune | 3/4 stars |
| Clash | 8/10 |
| DIY | 4/5 stars |
| Paste | 7.6/10 |
| Pitchfork | 7.2/10 |

The Unseen in Between is the fourth studio album by American singer-songwriter Steve Gunn. It was released on January 18, 2019 through Matador Records.

== Track listing ==
| No. | Title | Length |
|---|---|---|
| 1. | "New Moon" | 5:10 |
| 2. | "Vagabond" | 5:01 |
| 3. | "Chance" | 4:25 |
| 4. | "Stonehurst Cowboy" | 3:41 |
| 5. | "Luciano" | 5:53 |
| 6. | "New Familiar" | 5:56 |
| 7. | "Lightning Field" | 5:00 |
| 8. | "Morning Is Mended" | 4:00 |
| 9. | "Paranoid" | 5:16 |
| Total length: | | 44:22 |

== Charts ==
| Chart | Peak position |
|---|---|
| Belgian Albums (Ultratop Flanders) | 54 |
| US Heatseekers Albums (Billboard) | 11 |
| US Independent Albums (Billboard) | 24 |
