= Pink Couch Sessions =

Pink Couch Sessions was a musical performance video series hosted by If You Make It. The series features primarily acoustic performances of independent DIY artists, primarily within the genres of punk, pop punk, folk punk, and indie pop. The website and all its features were hosted by Dave Garwacke, a musician who has played drums for such bands as Laura Stevenson and The Cans and Kudrow. The series takes its name from Garwacke's titular pink couch, on which the artists sat while performing in most of the videos.

== History ==
Garwacke founded If You Make It in New Paltz, New York in 2006 before moving to Brooklyn. Lamenting the lack of documentation of the artists and performances he'd hosted at his house in New Paltz, he decided to begin bringing recording equipment to his friends' shows. If You Make It expanded to include articles, a donation-based digital record label, music videos, comics, and the Pink Couch Sessions. The goal of these various projects was to provide a record of artists whom Garwacke admired and hoped to help promote. The Pink Couch Sessions were filmed at Garwacke's home studio in his apartment in Brooklyn, featuring artists as they toured through the tri-state area. The first session was published on September 26, 2007, featuring Laura Stevenson performing her song "Amphibian." Over one hundred videos were released over the course of the series, with over one million YouTube and Vimeo views, featuring a variety of artists, including Andrew Jackson Jihad, Hop Along, Bomb The Music Industry!, The Menzingers, The Bouncing Souls, Waxahatchee, Tigers Jaw, Fake Problems, Mikey Erg, Matt Pryor, Mixtapes, RVIVR, The Sidekicks, A.W., Direct Hit, Aye Nako, Walter Schreifels, Spraynard, and Braid. The series was published regularly until 2012, with several previously unpublished archival videos being released through 2013.

== Production ==
Originally, a Panasonic GS-320 camera was used to record the artists, later replaced by a Canon HF100. Initially lacking an external mic or manual gain control, the audio quality initially depended on the natural acoustics of the room. The videos were recorded in HD, using an AT-822 stereo condenser mic.
