= My Roaring 20's =

Studio album by Cheap Girls
- Released: October 9, 2009
- Recorded: 2009
- Genre: Power pop Indie rock Punk rock Pop punk
- Length: 27:11
- Label: Paper + Plastick, Asian Man Records
- Producer: Rick Johnson, Cheap Girls

Cheap Girls chronology
Find Me A Drink Home (2008)	My Roaring 20's (2009)	Giant Orange (2012)

Professional ratings
Review scores
Source	Rating
Sputnikmusic	5/5 stars
Punknews.org	4.5/5 stars
Alternative Press	4.5/5 stars

My Roaring 20's is the second studio album by American rock group Cheap Girls. It was released on October 9, 2009, through Paper + Plastick. The album was produced by Rick Johnson and the group.

== Recording ==
Recording for the album began in February 2009 at Rick Johnson's studio.

== Release ==
The album was released on October 9, 2009. On August 2, 2012, it was announced that future pressings of My Roaring 20's would be released by Asian Man Records.

== Track listing ==
Standard edition
No.	Title	Length
1.	"Sunnyside"	3:17
2.	"Ft. Lauderdale"	2:24
3.	"Hey Hey, I'm Worn Out"	2:31
4.	"I Had A Motorcycle"	3:09
5.	"Sleeping Weather"	2:44
6.	"Something That I Need"	2:06
7.	"Modern Faces"	2:26
8.	"Lab Technicians"	2:06
9.	"All My Clean Friends"	3:00
10.	"One & Four"	3:24
Total length:		27:07
