= Still Life (Kevin Morby album) =

Studio album by Kevin Morby
- Released: October 14, 2014
- Recorded: March–June 2014
- Genre: Indie rock
- Length: 42:57
- Label: Woodsist
- Producer: Rob Barbato

Kevin Morby chronology
| Harlem River (2013) | Still Life (2014) | Singing Saw (2016) |

Still Life is the second studio album by American indie rock musician Kevin Morby, released on October 14, 2014, by Woodsist Records. The album's title and cover were taken from an art piece by Maynard Monrow titled "Still Life with the Rejects from the Land of Misfit Toys".

== Critical reception ==
Professional ratings
Aggregate scores
| Source | Rating |
|---|---|
| Metacritic | 80/100 |
Review scores
| Source | Rating |
| AllMusic | 4/5 stars |
| Pitchfork Media | 7.9/10 |
| Wondering Sound | 7/10 |
| Consequence of Sound | B− |
| Soundblab | 80% |

Still Life received wide acclaim from contemporary music critics. At Metacritic, which assigns a normalized rating out of 100 to reviews from mainstream critics, the album received an average score of 80, based on 7 reviews, which indicates "generally favorable reviews".

== Track list ==
All songs written by Kevin Morby.

| No. | Title | Length |
|---|---|---|
| 1. | "The Jester, The Tramp & The Acrobat" | 4:21 |
| 2. | "The Ballad of Arlo Jones" | 2:46 |
| 3. | "Motors Running" | 3:21 |
| 4. | "All of My Life" | 3:30 |
| 5. | "Drowning" | 5:19 |
| 6. | "Bloodsucker" | 4:25 |
| 7. | "Parade" | 5:25 |
| 8. | "Dancer" | 3:04 |
| 9. | "Amen" | 7:55 |
| 10. | "Our Moon" | 2:51 |
| Total length: | | 42:57 |

== Personnel ==
Musicians

- Kevin Morby – vocals, guitar, bass (track 5), piano (1)
- Justin Sullivan – drums, percussion
- Huw Evans – bass (1, 2, 4), backing vocals (7)
- Will Canzoneri – organ (1, 2, 4, 9), piano (7, 9, 10), backing vocals (7)
- A. Conrad – baritone saxophone (7, 9)
- J. Santamaria – alto saxophone (7, 9)
- B. Sherman – trumpet (7, 9)
- Alex Lilly – backing vocals (7)

Production and artwork

- Rob Barbato – producer, bass (3, 7, 9), guitar, double bass (6), organ (3), percussion (5), backing vocals (7)
- Drew Fischer – engineer, mixing
- Maynard Monroe – cover photography
- Robbie Simon – cover layout
- Amy Harrity – back cover photography
- Nicole Bonneau – back cover layout
- Eleanor Swordy – paintings
