= We All Want the Same Things =

Studio album by Craig Finn
- Released: March 24, 2017
- Genre: Indie rock
- Length: 43:58
- Label: Partisan
- Producer: Josh Kaufman

Craig Finn chronology
Faith in the Future (2015)	We All Want the Same Things (2017)	I Need a New War (2019)

Professional ratings
Aggregate scores
Source	Rating
Metacritic	73/100
Review scores
Source	Rating
AllMusic	4/5 stars
American Songwriter	4.5/5 stars
The A.V. Club	B
DIY	3/5 stars
Exclaim!	6/10
The Guardian	4/5 stars
Paste	8.2/10
Pitchfork	7.8/10
PopMatters	6/10 stars
The Skinny	4/5 stars
Slant Magazine	3.5/5 stars

We All Want the Same Things is the third studio album by Craig Finn. It was released on Partisan Records on March 24, 2017.

The title comes from a line in the song "God in Chicago". Craig Finn said, "It seems like a bit of dark humor in these turbulent political times, but it also rings true: No matter our differences, we all have some very basic wants and needs that line up with each other."

== Critical reception ==
At Metacritic, which assigns a weighted average score out of 100 to reviews from mainstream critics, the album received an average score of 73% based on 15 reviews, indicating "generally favorable reviews".

Sarah Murphy of Exclaim! gave the album a 6 out of 10, saying, "We All Want the Same Things won't quench the casual fan's thirst for new drunken bar rock anthems, but for those willing to listen a bit more closely (and quietly), Finn's solo work still provides some stories worth hearing. Sam Sodomsky of Pitchfork gave the album a 7.8 out of 10 and called it "a remarkable record not for sounding like a return-to-form, but for feeling like entirely new territory without sacrificing its thrill or familiarity."

== Track listing ==
No.	Title	Length
1.	"Jester & June"	3:59
2.	"Preludes"	4:16
3.	"Ninety Bucks"	3:41
4.	"Birds Trapped in the Airport"	4:41
5.	"God in Chicago"	4:45
6.	"Rescue Blues"	4:15
7.	"Tangletown"	4:30
8.	"It Hits When It Hits"	5:26
9.	"Tracking Shots"	3:36
10.	"Be Honest"	4:49

== Charts ==
Chart (2017)	Peak position
US Independent Albums (Billboard)	12
US Tastemaker Albums (Billboard)	18
US Americana/Folk Albums (Billboard)	11
