= Goose (American band) =

American jam band

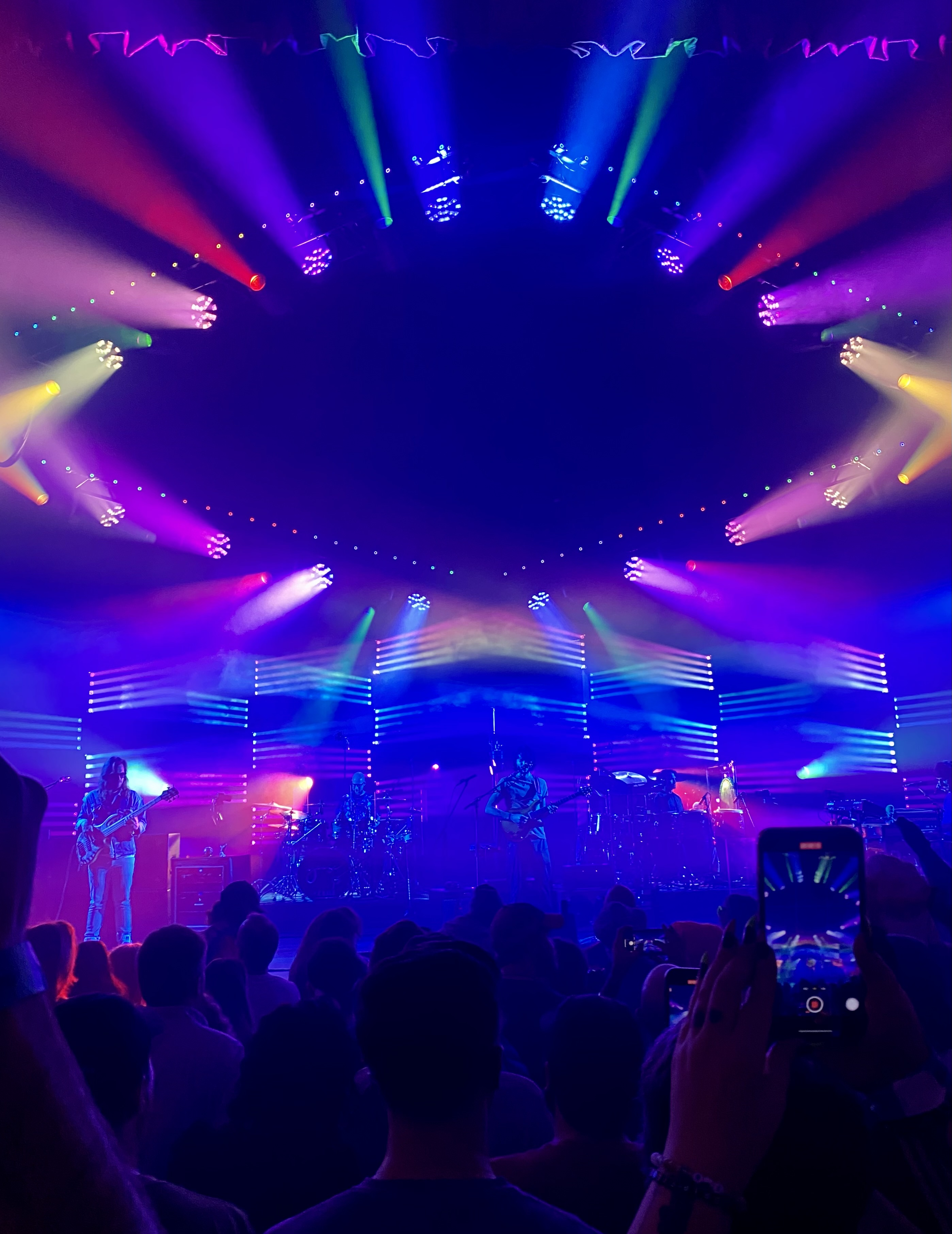
- Goose at The Capitol Theatre in Port Chester, New York, on March 10, 2023

Background information
- Origin: Wilton, Connecticut, U.S.
- Genres: Rock; progressive rock; funk rock; psychedelic rock; jam rock
- Years active: 2014–present
- Members: Rick Mitarotonda; Trevor Weeks; Peter Anspach; Cotter Ellis
- Past members: Ben Teeters; Isaac Slutzky; Ben Atkind; Peter Castaldi; Chris "Doc" Capozzoli; Patrick Carr; Kris Yunker; Aaron Hagele; Jeff Arevalo
- Website: goosetheband.com

Goose is an American rock band from Wilton, Connecticut, formed in 2014. The band consists of Rick Mitarotonda, Trevor Weeks, Peter Anspach, and Cotter Ellis.

Goose has gained popularity since early 2020, in large part due to live performances with larger acts like Dead & Company, Dave Matthews Band, Trey Anastasio, and Bob Weir.

== History ==
=== Formation and early years: 2014–2019 ===
The origins of Goose trace back to Berklee College of Music, where guitarist Rick Mitarotonda met drummer Ben Atkind in a class called "Fusion Ensemble Level 6." Atkind later recalled that Mitarotonda "was the quietest kid in class, but he was my favorite of the three guitarists by far." In January 2012, Mitarotonda invited Atkind to join a precursor band called Vasudo, along with Wilton, Connecticut natives Trevor Weeks on bass and Matt Campbell on keyboards and vocals. Vasudo remained active for approximately 18 months before dissolving when Mitarotonda left for Colorado.

Goose was officially formed in 2014 when Mitarotonda returned from Colorado and reenrolled at Berklee, founding the band with Atkind and Weeks. The band took their name from an inside joke dating to Mitarotonda's time working at a taco shop in Colorado. In their early years, the band performed in Connecticut basements and local bars, gradually building their following. The band recorded their debut album Moon Cabin in 2016 in a barn in northern New Hampshire, establishing their DIY approach early in their career.

Multi-instrumentalist Peter Anspach joined the band in 2017, followed by percussionist Jeff Arevalo in 2020, with Cotter Ellis joining the band in 2024.

=== Rise to prominence: 2019–2023 ===
The band garnered praise for their performance at the 2019 edition of The Peach Music Festival, which gained them popularity in the jam band scene and has been viewed over 420,000 times on YouTube/Facebook as of March 2023. In January 2020 the band played two well received late night performances at Dead & Company's Playing in the Sand event in Mexico. The band's rise in popularity resulted in booking larger venues for their 2020 tour, such as the Bowery Ballroom in New York City, but they canceled the tour after the COVID-19 pandemic shut down live music performances worldwide. Instead, the band livestreamed eight concerts without an audience from a barn in Connecticut in June 2020, called the Bingo Tour. The Bingo Tour grossed more than $100,000 for the band.

Goose released a 20-minute jam version of the Vampire Weekend song "2021" in February 2021 at the request of Vampire Weekend singer Ezra Koenig, who is a fan of the group.

Following the pandemic, Goose booked a series of performances at larger venues in 2021 and 2022, such as Radio City Music Hall in New York, Red Rocks Amphitheatre in Morrison, Colorado, and their first-ever arena concerts at the Mohegan Sun Arena in their native Connecticut. On June 24 and 25, 2022, Goose played two shows at Radio City Music Hall. The June 25 concert featured appearances by Father John Misty, and Phish guitarist and lead singer Trey Anastasio, the latter of whom played with Goose for their entire third set. Goose and the Trey Anastasio Band performed together in an eight-date co-headlining tour in November 2022.

Goose utilised nugs.net as the streaming platform, to distribute their recordings. Their first live streamed show was at Red Rocks Amphitheatre in 2022 and it was sold out before the pandemic. Since then, they have consistently been streaming. They took a different pathway instead of streaming on major labels and apps such as Spotify and Apple Music.

In January 2023, Goose was the top billed special guest at Dead & Company's Playing in the Sand festival in Mexico, headlining on the main stage on the second night. During their January 15 performance, the band was joined by Bob Weir for three songs at the end of the first set. Atkind and Arevalo went on to play with the Rhythm Devils during "Drums" at Dead & Company's next shows.

In July 2023, at Resonance Festival in Ohio, Goose was joined on stage during the second set by Jake Cinninger and Joel Cummins of Umphrey's McGee to perform "Empress of Organos". That same month, at the Newport Folk Festival, the band were joined on-stage by Animal from Dr. Teeth and the Electric Mayhem for their performance of "Animal".

Anspach personally mixes the band's live performances for release shortly after the band finishes their concerts.

On June 28, 2025 (11 years after their formation), Goose performed their first headlining show at Madison Square Garden in New York City, marking their biggest headlining performance to date. They played a four-hour and 2-minute concert.

=== Lineup changes: 2023–present ===
On December 22, 2023, the band released a statement that founding member and original drummer Ben Atkind would be departing from the band. On February 5, 2024, the band announced that Cotter Ellis would be joining the band as the new drummer.

On November 24, 2024, Goose played at Madison Square Garden as part of the Soulshine relief concert, for major hurricanes Helene and Milton. They played with Dave Matthews, performing the Bruce Hornsby song "The Way It Is".

On January 27, 2025, the band announced their upcoming fourth studio album, Everything Must Go, and released its debut single, "Give It Time". The album was subsequently released on April 25, 2025.

On February 3, 2025, the band posted announcement to social media that percussionist Jeff Arevalo was taking a hiatus from touring to prioritize his health. On March 23 that same year, the band announced that he had been permanently removed from the band due to "behavior in Jeff's personal life that does not align with the band's core values."

In August 2025, the band released their fifth studio album, Chain Yer Dragon.

On April 7, 2026, the band announced their sixth studio album, Big Modern!, which released on June 12.

== Musical style and influences ==
Goose has been regularly compared to jam bands such as Phish and Umphrey's McGee, both of which the band's members count as influences. Goose describes itself as an "indie groove" band, but does acknowledge its jam band influences; speaking to Uproxx music critic Steven Hyden, guitarist Rick Mitarotonda said "Frankly there are a lot of cheesy and not great jam bands that have existed over time. Obviously, we've strayed away from that for obvious reasons, or tried to at least. But, I mean, we are a jam band. We jam, and we improvise a lot." Hyden wrote that Goose's indie rock and trance influences contrast the funk and progressive rock influences of Phish and the folk, jazz, and blues influences of the Grateful Dead.

== Personnel ==
=== Band members ===
Current members

- Rick Mitarotonda – guitar, vocals (2014–present)
- Trevor Weeks – bass, vocals, poetry (2014–present)
- Peter Anspach – keyboards, guitar, vocals (2017–present)
- Cotter Ellis – drums, vocals (2024–present)

Former members

- Ben Teeters – drums (2014)
- Isaac Slutzky – keyboards (2014)
- Ben Atkind – drums (2014–2023)
- Peter Castaldi – guitar (2015–2016)
- Chris "Doc" Capozzoli – keyboards (2015–2016)
- Patrick "Butters" Carr – keyboards, guitar (2015–2016)
- Kris Yunker – keyboards (2016–2017)
- Aaron Hagele – percussion (2016–2018)
- Jeff Arevalo – percussion, drums, vocals, guitar (2020–2025)

Timeline

== Discography ==
=== Studio albums ===
- Moon Cabin (2016)
- Shenanigans Nite Club (2021)
- Dripfield (2022)
- Everything Must Go (2025)
- Chain Yer Dragon (2025)
- Big Modern! (2026)

=== Extended plays ===
- Ted Tapes I (2019)
- Ted Tapes II (2019)
- Ted Tapes III (2020)
- Night Lights (2020)
- Undecided (2022)
- Autumn Crossing (2023)

=== Live albums ===
- Alive and Well (2020)
- Bingo Tour (2020)
- 2019.11.16 Buffalo, NY (2021)
- 2020.10.03 Swanzey, NH (2021)
- Ted Tapes 2021 (2021)
- 2021.11.21 Denver, CO (2021)
- 2022.03.12 Philadelphia, PA (2022)
- 2022.12.16 Broomfield, CO (2023)
- 2022.12.31 Cincinnati, OH (2023)
- Live at the Salt Shed 2023.04.14–15 Chicago, IL (2023)
- Live at Radio City Music Hall (2023)
- Ted Tapes 2024 (2024)
- Live at the Capitol Theatre (2024)
- Live at the Fox Theatre (2024)
- Live at the Greek Theatre (2024)
- Rehearsal Recordings 2024 (2024)
- Live at the Madison Square Garden (2025)

=== Remix albums ===
- Everything Must Go Remixed (2026)

=== Singles ===
Title	Year	Peak chart positions		Album
Title	Year	US AAA	US Alt	Album
"Sinnerman"	2021	—	—	Non-album single
"Borne"	2022	—	—	Dripfield
"Dripfield"	2022	—	—	Dripfield
"Hungersite"	2022	7	—	Dripfield
"Arrow"	2022	—	—	Dripfield
"Give It Time"	2025	7	—	Everything Must Go
"Lead Up"	2025	—	—	Everything Must Go
"Your Direction"	2025	21	—	Everything Must Go
"Madalena"	2025	5	—	Chain Yer Dragon
"Good2B"	2026	7	—	Big Modern
"Torero"	2026	—	—	Big Modern
"Good Times // End Times"	2026	17	35	Big Modern
