= Sundowner (album) =

Studio album by Kevin Morby
- Released: October 16, 2020
- Recorded: January 2019
- Studio: Sonic Ranch
- Length: 46:41
- Label: Dead Oceans
- Producer: Brad Cook

Kevin Morby chronology
| Oh My God (2019) | Sundowner (2020) | This Is a Photograph (2022) |

Singles from Sundowner
- 1. "Campfire" Released: September 1, 2020; 2. "Don't Underestimate Midwest American Sun" Released: September 23, 2020; 3. "Wander" Released: September 23, 2020; 4. "Sundowner" Released: October 7, 2020

Sundowner is the sixth studio album by American indie rock musician Kevin Morby, released on October 16, 2020, on Dead Oceans.

== Background ==
Sundowner was written at Morby's home in Kansas where he lives with his partner Katie Crutchfield, and which they nicknamed 'The Little Los Angeles'. The album was recorded in January 2019 with producer Brad Cook at Sonic Ranch in Tornillo, Texas. In the meantime, Morby released his fifth studio album, Oh My God (2019), and went on tour in support of it. In 2020, during the COVID-19 pandemic, Morby and Cook put the finishing touches on Sundowner from their respective homes.

In an essay announcing the album, Morby described the album as his "attempt to put the Middle American twilight—its beauty profound, though not always immediate—into sound".

== Release ==
Sundowner was announced on September 1, 2020. The album's first single "Campfire", was released the same day. "Don't Underestimate Midwest American Sun" and "Wander" were released as singles on September 23, 2020. "Sundowner" was released as a single on October 7, 2020. The album was released on October 16, 2020 via Dead Oceans.

=== A Night at the Little Los Angeles ===
On October 8, 2021, Morby released A Night at the Little Los Angeles, a collection of 4-track demo versions of the songs on Sundowner. It features demos of all the songs except "Jamie", which is replaced with a demo version of Morby's standalone single "U.S. Mail".

== Critical reception ==
Professional ratings
Aggregate scores
| Source | Rating |
|---|---|
| AnyDecentMusic? | 7.1/10 |
| Metacritic | 73/100 |
Review scores
| Source | Rating |
| AllMusic | 3.5/5 stars |
| Clash | 7/10 |
| Exclaim! | 7/10 |
| Loud and Quiet | 8/10 |
| musicOMH | 4/5 stars |
| Mojo | 4/5 stars |
| NME | 3/5 stars |
| Pitchfork | 7.2/10 |
| PopMatters | 7/10 stars |
| Uncut | 7/10 |

At Metacritic, which assigns a normalized rating out of 100 to reviews from mainstream critics, Sundowner received an average score of 73 based on 12 reviews, indicating "generally favorable reviews".

Fred Thomas of AllMusic wrote, "Its gentle melancholy and unhurried tempos slowly melt into a sustained atmosphere, offering some of Morby's gentlest and most captivating songs." Ross Horton of musicOMH called it "Morby's Harvest Moon, his Nebraska, his Hejira – a statement of intent made in the quietest way possible".

=== Year-end lists ===
Year-end lists for Sundowner
| Publication | List | Rank | Ref. |
|---|---|---|---|
| NBHAP | 50 Best Albums of 2020 | 49 | |
| Uncut | The Top 75 Albums of the Year | 27 | |
| Indie Basement (BrooklynVegan) | Top 40 Albums of 2020 | 36 | |

== Track listing ==
All tracks are written by Kevin Morby.

Sundowner track listing
| No. | Title | Length |
|---|---|---|
| 1. | "Valley" | 4:04 |
| 2. | "Brother, Sister" | 4:37 |
| 3. | "Sundowner" | 5:09 |
| 4. | "Campfire" | 5:19 |
| 5. | "Wander" | 1:54 |
| 6. | "Don't Underestimate Midwest American Sun" | 5:21 |
| 7. | "A Night at the Little Los Angeles" | 7:10 |
| 8. | "Jamie" | 4:11 |
| 9. | "Velvet Highway" | 3:20 |
| 10. | "Provisions" | 5:36 |
| Total length: | | 46:41 |

== Personnel ==
- Kevin Morby – vocals, guitar, drums, piano, mellotron, pump organ, insert photo
- Brad Cook – production, bass, keys, drum machine, backing vocals (track 2)
- Katie Crutchfield – vocals (tracks 4, 6)
- James Krivchenia – percussion, backing vocals (track 2)
- Jerry Ordonez – mixing, engineering
- Brent Lambert – mastering
- Johnny Eastland – cover photo
- Matt Lief Anderson – insert photo
- Mike Krol – layout, design
