= City Music =

2017 album by Kevin Morby

Studio album by Kevin Morby
- Released: June 16, 2017
- Recorded: Panoramic, Stinson Beach, CA (2015-16)
- Genres: Folk rock; indie folk
- Length: 48:03
- Label: Dead Oceans
- Producers: Kevin Morby, Richard Swift

Kevin Morby chronology
Singing Saw (2016)	City Music (2017)	Oh My God (2019)

Professional ratings
Aggregate scores
Source	Rating
AnyDecentMusic?	7.6/10
Metacritic	80/100
Review scores
Source	Rating
AllMusic	4/5 stars
The A.V. Club	B+
DIY	4/5 stars
Exclaim!	8/10
Mojo	3/5 stars
NME	4/5 stars
Pitchfork	8.1/10
Q	4/5 stars
Record Collector	3/5 stars
Uncut	9/10

City Music is the fourth studio album by American indie rock musician Kevin Morby, released on June 16, 2017, on Dead Oceans.

== Track listing ==
All songs by Kevin Morby except where noted.

1. "Come to Me Now" – 4:50
2. "Crybaby" – 3:58
3. "1234" – 1:45 (incorporates a portion of "People Who Died", written by Jim Carroll, Brian Linsley, Stephen Linsley, Terrell Winn and Wayne Woods)
4. "Aboard My Train" – 3:19
5. "Dry Your Eyes" – 4:11
6. "City Music" – 6:46
7. "Tin Can" – 3:33
8. "Caught in My Eye" – 4:49 (Darby Crash)
9. "Night Time" – 6:07
10. "Pearly Gates" – 3:50
11. "Downtown's Lights" – 4:23
