= Singing Saw (album) =

Studio album by Kevin Morby
- Released: April 15, 2016
- Recorded: 2015–2016
- Studios: Isokon, Woodstock, New York
- Genres: Folk rock; indie folk
- Length: 43:25
- Label: Dead Oceans
- Producer: Sam Cohen

Kevin Morby chronology
Still Life (2014)	Singing Saw (2016)	City Music (2017)

Singles from Singing Saw
- 1. "I Have Been to the Mountain" Released: February 9, 2016; 2. "Dorothy" Released: March 24, 2016; 3. "Destroyer" Released: April 13, 2016

Singing Saw is the third studio album by American indie rock musician Kevin Morby, released on April 15, 2016, on Dead Oceans.

== Critical reception ==
Professional ratings
Aggregate scores
Source	Rating
AnyDecentMusic?	8.1/10
Metacritic	84/100
Review scores
Source	Rating
AllMusic	4/5 stars
Consequence of Sound	B
Mojo	4/5 stars
NME	4/5
The Observer	4/5 stars
Pitchfork	8.3/10
PopMatters	8/10
Q	4/5 stars
Record Collector	4/5 stars
Uncut	9/10

Singing Saw received widespread critical acclaim from contemporary music critics. At Metacritic, which assigns a normalized rating out of 100 to reviews from mainstream critics, the album received an average score of 84, based on 13 reviews, which indicates "universal acclaim ".

Mark Richardson of Pitchfork praised the album, stating, "Singing Saw is his strongest album because it shows a process of refinement, and because Morby’s songwriting has become less referential and more grounded. The basic ingredients haven’t changed, but Morby is figuring out how to retain and amplify his strongest points—his weary and wise voice, his understanding of how the musical pieces fit together—and leave everything else behind. On his debut, Morby’s voice cracked in places, suggesting effort that transcended ability, but Singing Saw finds him cool and controlled at every turn, fully aware of his limitations but confident in what he can accomplish within them. His singing is simultaneously intimate and distant, part conversation and part stylized monologue. Single lines don’t really stand out, but Morby’s commitment to such elemental concerns has a cumulative effect, and the album’s lack of specificity becomes a strength."

=== Accolades ===
Publication	Accolade	Year	Rank	Ref.
Mojo	The 50 Best Albums of 2016	2016	23	
Pitchfork	The 20 Best Rock Albums of 2016	2016	—N/a	
Pitchfork	The 50 Best Albums of 2016	2016	34	
Pitchfork	Readers' Top 50 Albums of 2016	2016	37	
Rough Trade	Albums of the Year	2016	28	
The Skinny	Top 50 Albums of 2016	2016	44	
Uncut	Top 75 Albums of 2016	2016	50	

== Track listing ==
All tracks are written by Kevin Morby.

No.	Title	Length
1.	"Cut Me Down"	3:32
2.	"I Have Been to the Mountain"	3:14
3.	"Singing Saw"	7:15
4.	"Drunk and on a Star"	4:18
5.	"Dorothy"	5:08
6.	"Ferris Wheel"	3:05
7.	"Destroyer"	4:26
8.	"Black Flowers"	5:47
9.	"Water"	6:40
Total length:		43:25

== Personnel ==
Credits adapted from the liner notes of Singing Saw.

Main personnel

- Kevin Morby – guitar, vocals, piano
- Sam Cohen – guitar, bass, keyboards, drums
- Marco Benevento – piano (2, 3, 5, 8, 9), keyboards (2, 3, 5, 8, 9)
- John Andrews – singing saw (1, 3)
- Alec Spiegelman – saxophone (4, 7), flute (4, 7)
- Eliza Bagg – strings (1, 4, 7, 9)
- Oliver Hill – strings (1, 4, 7, 9)
- Cole Kamen-Green – trumpet (2, 5, 9)
- Justin Sullivan – drums (2–4), percussion (2–4)
- Nick Kinsey – drums (2, 5, 7–9), percussion (2, 5, 7–9)
- Alecia Chakour – backing vocals (2, 3, 5, 7–9)
- Hannah Cohen – backing vocals (2, 3, 5, 7–9)
- Lauren Balthrop – backing vocals (2, 3, 5, 7–9)

Additional personnel

- Sam Cohen – production, additional engineering
- Jeff Lipton – mastering
- D. James Goodwin – engineering, mixing
- John Thayer – assistant engineering
- Maria Rice – assistant mastering engineering
- Dusdin Condren – photography
- Miles Johnson – design

== Charts ==
Chart (2016)	Peak position
Belgian Albums (Ultratop Flanders)	104
Belgian Albums (Ultratop Wallonia)	158
French Albums (SNEP)	182
