= Oh My God (Kevin Morby album) =

Studio album by Kevin Morby
- Released: April 26, 2019
- Recorded: Brooklyn, NY
- Length: 49:27
- Label: Dead Oceans
- Producer: Sam Cohen

Kevin Morby chronology
City Music (2017)	Oh My God (2019)	Sundowner (2020)

Singles from Oh My God
- 1. "No Halo" Released: 27 February 2019

Oh My God is the fifth studio album by American indie rock musician Kevin Morby, released on April 26, 2019, on Dead Oceans.

== Critical reception ==
Professional ratings
Aggregate scores
Source	Rating
Metacritic	81/100
Review scores
Source	Rating
AllMusic	3.5/5 stars
DIY	4/5 stars
Exclaim!	9/10
The Guardian	4/5 stars
Loud and Quiet	7/10
NME	4/5 stars
Pitchfork	6.2/10
Rolling Stone	3.5/5 stars
Uncut	8/10

Oh My God received universal acclaim from contemporary music critics. At Metacritic, which assigns a normalized rating of 0-100 based on reviews from mainstream critics, the album received an average score of 81, based on 20 reviews.

== Track listing ==
All music is composed by Kevin Morby.

No.	Title	Length
1.	"Oh My God"	4:05
2.	"No Halo"	3:06
3.	"Nothing Sacred / All Things Wild"	3:31
4.	"OMG Rock n Roll"	2:29
5.	"Seven Devils"	3:55
6.	"Hail Mary"	5:38
7.	"Piss River"	5:20
8.	"Savannah"	3:21
9.	"Storm (Beneath the Weather)"	1:21
10.	"Congratulations"	2:46
11.	"I Want to Be Clean"	3:30
12.	"Sing a Glad Song"	4:23
13.	"Ballad of Faye"	2:25
14.	"O Behold"	3:42
Total length:		49:27

== Charts ==
Chart (2019)	Peak position
Belgian Albums (Ultratop Flanders)	88
Belgian Albums (Ultratop Wallonia)	197
French Albums (SNEP)	151
Scottish Albums (Official Charts)	75
UK Independent Albums (Official Charts)	18
Billboard US Heatseekers	2
Billboard US Independent	15
