= Kevin Morby =

American musician

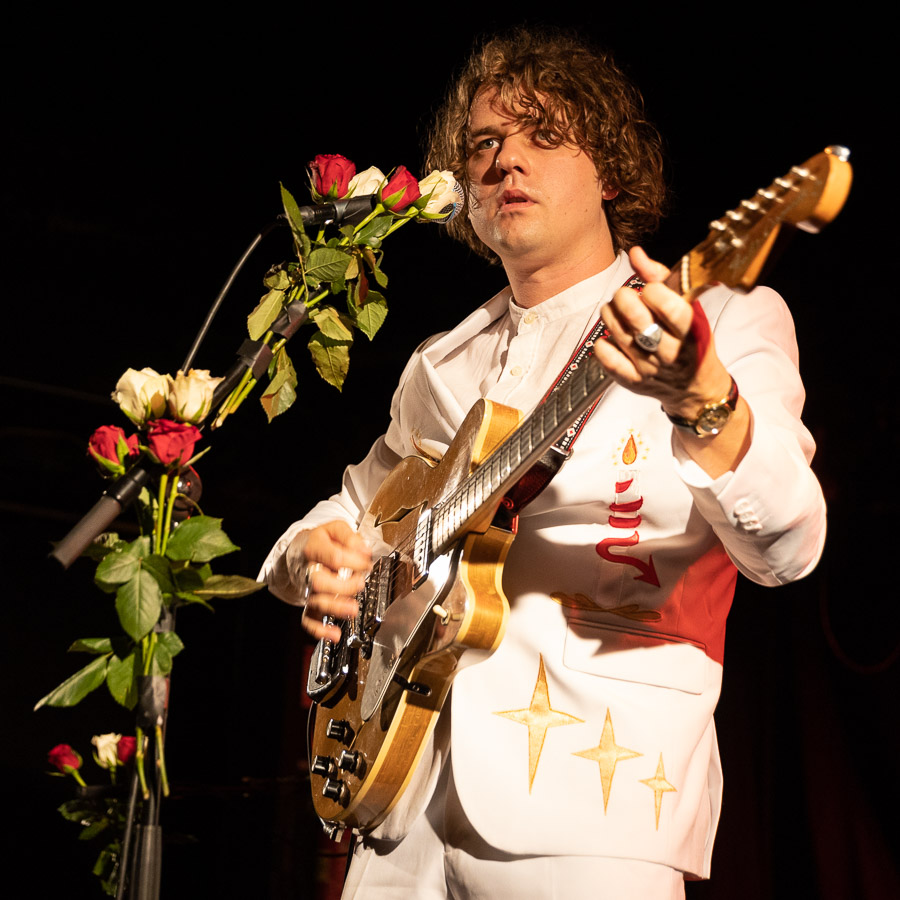
- Morby performing in 2019

Background information
- Born: Kevin Robert Morby; April 2, 1988 (age 38); Lubbock, Texas, U.S.
- Genres: Indie rock, folk rock
- Occupations: Musician, singer-songwriter
- Instruments: Vocals; guitar; bass; piano
- Years active: 2008–present
- Labels: Woodsist, Dead Oceans
- Formerly of: Woods, The Babies
- Partner: Katie Crutchfield (since 2017)

Kevin Robert Morby (born 2 April 1988) is an American musician, singer, and songwriter. A former member of Woods and the Babies, Morby has released eight solo studio albums: Harlem River (2013), Still Life (2014), Singing Saw (2016), City Music (2017), Oh My God (2019), Sundowner (2020), This Is a Photograph (2022), and Little Wide Open (2026).

== Biography ==
=== Early life, Woods, and The Babies ===
Kevin Morby was born in Lubbock, Texas. His family relocated around the U.S. due to his father's employment with General Motors before settling in Kansas City, Missouri. Morby learned to play guitar when he was 10. In his teens he formed the band Creepy Aliens.

At the age of 17, Morby dropped out of Blue Valley Northwest High School, got his GED, and moved to Brooklyn, supporting himself by working bike delivery and café jobs. Morby has stated he had "loved New York from the movies" he'd seen, "I just wanted to experience it". He later joined the noise-folk group Woods on bass. While living in Brooklyn, he became close friends and roommates with Cassie Ramone of the punk trio Vivian Girls, and the two formed a side project together called The Babies, which released albums in 2011 and 2012.

=== 2013–2015: Harlem River and Still Life ===
Following his move to Los Angeles, Morby recorded a collection of songs with Babies producer Rob Barbato that were intended to be an homage to New York City. Released in 2013 by Woodsist Records, the eight-song collection was called Harlem River and became Morby's debut as a solo artist. The album also features drummer Justin Sullivan (The Babies) as well as contributions from Will Canzoneri, Tim Presley (White Fence), Dan Iead, and Cate Le Bon.

While on tour, Morby wrote songs that were later featured on his second album, Still Life. The album was once again produced by Barbato and released on October 14, 2014.

=== 2016–2018: Singing Saw and City Music ===
Morby worked with Sam Cohen (Apollo Sunshine, Yellowbirds) on his third album, titled Singing Saw, which was released on April 15, 2016.

In 2016, Morby wrote Beautiful Strangers, a protest song in remembrance of Paris 2015 attacks, Orlando 2016 shooting, and death of Freddie Gray. After various live performance that year, it was released as a single in October 2016, with the proceeds benefitting Everytown for Gun Safety.

Morby's fourth studio album was recorded with his live band, with guitarist Meg Duffy noting: "We all worked on the next record together, pretty collaboratively in terms of arranging and playing. We spent a week in a beautiful studio, up near Stinson Beach." The album, City Music, was released in June 2017.

Apart from City Music he also released in 2017 a cover version of “After Hours,” from the Velvet Underground’s 1969 self-titled album, in duo with Waxahatchee. As a tribute to Jason Molina, the duo covered in January 2018 two Jason Molina tracks for MusiCares, an American charity supporting musicians’ health. The digital single, also available as 7” vinyl through Dead Oceans, contained the two songs, “Farewell Transmission” and “The Dark Don’t Hide It”. The longtime private and musical relationship later led to touring and shows together, among others SXSW shows and a successful Australia tour (Sydney, Melbourne) in November 2018.

=== 2019–2020: Oh My God and Sundowner ===
Morby's fifth studio album, Oh My God, was announced on February 27, 2019. The first single off the album, "No Halo" was released on the same day. The album was released April 26, 2019, via Dead Oceans and was met with wide critical acclaim (19 of 20 published reviews aggregated on Metacritic were scored positive). It was featured in the April 24, 2019 The Wall Street Journal print edition headlined “Devine Intervention” and called Morby's best. The album reached number 2 on Billboard charts Heatseekers albums. In September 2019, Morby reunited with Woods for a special performance at their Woodsist festival.

Morby's sixth studio album, Sundowner, was announced on September 1, 2020. The first single off the album, "Campfire", was released on the same day. The album was released on October 16, 2020, via Dead Oceans.

On May 1, 2020, Morby released a live version of Beautiful Strangers & Harlem River on an album titled On Mon Dieu: Live à Paris. The recording came from Morby's sold-out performance at the Cabaret Sauvage in 2019. The album was released on Morby's Bandcamp through Dead Oceans. In October 2020, Morby released a standalone single, "US Mail", with an accompanying music video as well as sharing his own P.O. box number as a way to promote the USPS.

=== 2021–2023: This Is a Photograph ===
In February 2021, Marc Maron mentioned several times on Instagram Live that he doesn't know who Morby is, which Morby responded to on his own Instagram page, eventually leading to Maron posting an interview with Morby on Instagram Live.

On October 12, 2021, Morby and Hamilton Leithauser, who toured together in the fall of 2021, released the single "Virginia Beach". On October 8, 2021, Morby released A Night at the Little Los Angeles, an album of 4-track demo versions of songs that were originally on his 2020 album Sundowner. On December 13, 2021, Morby released "I Hear You Calling", a cover of the Bill Fay song, as a part of Dead Oceans' Bill Fay tribute 7" series.

On March 3, 2022, Morby announced that his seventh studio album, This Is a Photograph, will be released on Dead Oceans on May 13, 2022. The lead single of the same name was released on March 3, 2022.

On January 25, 2023, Morby released Music from Montana Story, the official soundtrack to the 2021 drama film Montana Story, through Dead Oceans. On April 25, 2023, Morby announced More Photographs (A Continuum), a companion album to This Is a Photograph. It was released on Dead Oceans on May 26, 2023. It features three reimagined versions of songs from This Is a Photograph, as well six new songs.

=== 2024–present: Little Wide Open ===
Aaron Dessner asked Morby to support his band The National on July 4, 2024, at their outdoor London show at Crystal Palace Bowl. Shortly after, Dessner contacted Morby to let him know he would be interested in producing his next album. In early 2025, the pair began recording Morby's eighth studio album at Dessner's Long Pond Studio, a secluded, rustic cabin in the Hudson Valley, New York. The pair finished recording in September 2025.

The resulting album, Little Wide Open, was released through Dead Oceans on May 15, 2026. The album's lyrics were influenced by Morby's life in the Midwest: "There’s something unintentionally musical about the Midwest; cicadas chirping in the trees, a train passing, a tornado siren going off. If you listen, there are these almost ominous sounds taking place beneath the wide-open sky —its ugliness and its beauty and how the two are often working together simultaneously. And while the Midwest isn’t technically the badlands, it’s my badlands."

== Mare Records ==
In June 2017, Morby officially launched his new label imprint, Mare Records, with the signing of Shannon Lay and announcement of her new LP, Living Water. Mare will operate as an imprint of the Woodsist label, which also released Morby's first two solo albums. Anna St Louis' debut album, If Only There Was a River, was scheduled to be released in December 2018 on Woodsist / Mare.

== Influences ==
Morby cites Lou Reed, Bob Dylan, Nina Simone, and Simon Joyner among his favorite artists.

== Backing band ==
Current

- Cochemea Gastelum – saxophone, flute, percussion (2019–present)
- Liam Kazar – guitar, piano, backing vocals (2023–present)
- Cole Berggreng – bass guitar (2026–present)
- Carmellia Hartman – keyboards, violin, backing vocals (2026–present)
- Dom Billet – drums (2026–present)

Former

- Justin Sullivan – drums (2013–2016; 2020)
- Meg Duffy – guitar, keyboards, backing vocals (2015–2018; 2026)
- Nick Kinsey – drums (2016–2020; 2026)
- Cyrus Gengras – bass guitar (2016–2020), guitar (2020–2026)
- Sam Cohen – guitar (2019)
- Alecia Chakour – backing vocals (2019)
- Lauren Balthrop – backing vocals (2019)
- Jared Samuel – keyboards (2019)
- Liam Cunningham – bass guitar (2022–2023)
- Stephen Patterson – drums (2022–2023)
- Dave Sherman – keyboards (2022–2023)
- Elizabeth Moen – backing vocals, percussion (2022–2023)
- Oliver Hill – violin (2022)
- Emma Tupa – violin (2023)

== Personal life ==
In 2017, Morby moved from Los Angeles to Overland Park, Kansas, near where he grew up. He has been in a relationship with fellow singer-songwriter Katie Crutchfield, of the band Waxahatchee, since 2017. Together they have covered songs by Jason Molina, Bob Dylan, The Velvet Underground, Everclear, and the Fray. On April 13, 2026, during her concert with MJ Lenderman at the Atlanta Symphony Hall, Crutchfield announced that she and Morby were expecting their first child together. The baby, a son, was born on July 21, 2026.

== Discography ==
=== Solo ===
Studio albums

- Harlem River (2013)
- Still Life (2014)
- Singing Saw (2016)
- City Music (2017)
- Oh My God (2019)
- Sundowner (2020)
- This Is a Photograph (2022)
- Little Wide Open (2026)

Compilation albums

- More Photographs (A Continuum) (2023)

Soundtrack albums

- Music from Montana Story (2023)

Demo albums

- A Night at the Little Los Angeles (2021)

Live albums

- Oh Mon Dieu: Live a Paris (2020)

=== With Woods ===
- At Echo Lake (2010)
- Sun and Shade (2011)
- Bend Beyond (2012)

=== With The Babies ===
- The Babies (2011)
- Our House on the Hill (2012)
