= Faith in the Future (Craig Finn album) =

Studio album by Craig Finn
- Released: September 11, 2015
- Genre: Indie rock
- Length: 39:43
- Label: Partisan
- Producer: Josh Kaufman

Craig Finn chronology
Clear Heart Full Eyes (2012)	Faith in the Future (2015)	We All Want the Same Things (2017)

Singles from Faith in the Future
- 1. "Newmyer's Roof" Released: September 11, 2015

Faith in the Future is the second studio album by the American indie rock musician Craig Finn, released on September 11, 2015, on Partisan Records.

== Background and recording ==
Regarding the differences between his solo material and his work with the rock-based band The Hold Steady, Craig Finn noted: "From the get-go, when I met with Josh Kaufman, we made this decision to do something more 'age appropriate' with the new album. Something that, as a 44-year old, seemed natural, and also hopefully more elegant and hopeful."

Working closely with Josh Kaufman, the pair recorded the album mostly as a duo: "Most of the album was just me and Josh. Just two of us, and sometimes Joe, so the arrangements are pretty sparse and unadorned. And that’s a lot easier than having to say to a band member 'OK, you’re not needed on this one!'"

== Writing and composition ==
In a similar manner to Finn's previous work, the album includes narrative-based songs that focus upon several fictional characters: "I always like writing new characters – in fact I think four of the songs on the new record have people’s names in the title! – because it frees you up from doing something confessional."

Most of the songs focus upon female protagonists with Finn noting: "For a while, I was writing a lot of songs about two people, just trying to write about couples, and then I stopped talking about the guy as much. It wasn't super intentional, but I realized I had all these songs about girls with very specific girls' names. When writing, putting a name to someone helps me envision them. I remember hearing the Donovan song "There Is a Mountain" in college, where the bridge goes, 'Oh, Juanita.' I was like, 'Who is Juanita? Where did we get to her?' I love those moments in songs."

Regarding the track, "Sandra from Scranton", Finn noted: "That one focuses on people who are aging hippies, still caught up in some kind of hipster lifestyle and trying to hang on to their youth by doing the same things that they did in their twenties. There are a lot of those people around, but I have a different way of looking at life these days: My version of growing older is not getting depressed or being in denial about it, but instead it’s 'Hey, we’ve survived!'"

== Critical reception ==
Professional ratings
Aggregate scores
Source	Rating
Metacritic	76/100
Review scores
Source	Rating
AllMusic	3.5/5 stars
The A.V. Club	B
Consequence of Sound	B
The Guardian	3/5 stars
Pitchfork	6.3/10
PopMatters	7/10 stars
Rolling Stone	4/5 stars

At Metacritic, which assigns a weighted average score out of 100 to reviews from mainstream critics, the album received an average score of 76% based on 17 reviews, indicating "generally favorable reviews".

American Songwriter named it the 8th best album of 2015. Charles Pitter at PopMatters noted that "Finn’s adept and poetic lyrics along with some challenging music ensure there are some dark thrills on this perilous ride".

== Track listing ==
All tracks are written by Craig Finn.

No.	Title	Length
1.	"Maggie I've Been Searching for Our Son"	4:02
2.	"Roman Guitars"	4:05
3.	"Newmyer's Roof"	4:42
4.	"Sarah, Calling from a Hotel"	3:15
5.	"Going to a Show"	3:29
6.	"Sandra from Scranton"	4:00
7.	"Saint Peter Upside Down"	4:26
8.	"Trapper Avenue"	4:34
9.	"Christine"	3:57
10.	"I Was Doing Fine (Then a Few People Died)"	3:15

== Charts ==
Chart	Peak position
US Independent Albums (Billboard)	18
US Top Rock Albums (Billboard)	34
US Folk Albums (Billboard)	4
