= Jon Bernson =

American singer-songwriter

Jon Bernson is an American singer, songwriter and recordist from San Francisco, California.

For eight years, Bernson led the indie-folk band Ray's Vast Basement and developed a multimedia approach that is frequently referred to as 'musical fiction'. Current projects include Exray's, Window Twins and THEMAYS.

== Ray's Vast Basement ==
Early Ray's Vast Basement performances began in 1999 as a one-man show that incorporated music, sound design, video, storytelling, dance and tableau vivant. Subsequent shows added a full band that toured the United States numerous times in support of two cassette releases and three full-length CD's. Ray's Vast Basement shared the stage with many of today's leading indie folk figures, including Jolie Holland, Horsefeathers, The Mountain Goats and Thao with the Get Down Stay Down. The band contributed to a variety of compilations, most notably the Verse Press audio book Isn't It Romantic which featured Richard Buckner, Jeff Tweedy, Jason Molina and David Berman. In addition to these recording efforts, Bernson also penned a short book that details a fictional mythology behind his creations.

== Exray's ==
Without explanation, Bernson abandoned the name Ray's Vast Basement in 2008 and adopted the Exray's moniker in collaboration with Michael Falsetto-Mapp. Exray's debut performance at SXSW was followed by a national tour and numerous unofficial live recordings. Exray's first studio recording, Ammunition Teeth, was released via cassette on October 12, 2010. The band's first LP, Exray's, was released in February, 2011. It features contributions by Nate Query from The Decemberists, Warren Huegel from Citay, Tim Cohen from The Fresh & Onlys and Black Fiction, Dominic Cramp from Evangelista and Jason Kick from Maus Haus.

Exray's first official song "Everything Goes" appeared on Secret Seven's compilation album In a Cloud: New Sounds from San Francisco, which also includes songs by Thee Oh Sees, Kelley Stoltz, The Fresh & Onlys, Tim Cohen, Sonny and the Sunsets, The Sandwitches, Grass Widow and others.

== Soundtracks ==
Since 2001 Bernson has written numerous soundtracks for theater and film. His most well known score is a cycle of songs written and performed for a staged version of John Steinbeck's Of Mice and Men in 2005. Two years later this music was released as a critically acclaimed album called Starvation Under Orange Trees. The Exray's song "Hesitation" was used in the soundtrack for David Fincher's major motion picture The Social Network, about the controversial founding of Facebook. Vera Freitag's 2005 film In a Steel Box also features a full soundtrack of Bernson's original music.

== Window Twins ==
Window Twins is a collaborative group with Tim Cohen that led to an LP called I'm This Tall City in 2008. Window Twins began as a duo, but now includes Kevin E. Taylor, a multi-instrumentalist and prolific visual artist. The collaboration between Bernson and Cohen has taken other forms over a five-year period. Bernson was a member of Cohen's Black Fiction and Cohen has contributed to Ray's Vast Basement recordings since 2006.

== Urban Music Program ==
In 1997 Bernson started the "Urban Music Program", an audio creation club for youth. Part of the Sunset Neighborhood Beacon Center in San Francisco, UMP has generated hundreds of original pieces music which have been released as a series of twenty CDR's known as Beacon Beats. Bernson's work in the UMP has also led to a series of experimental drone records under the THEMAYS moniker. KNOWFI (the debut release) was put out by Gigante Sound in 2009. The club's dedication to DJing was featured in Doug Pray's Scratch, an award-winning movie about the history of turntablism.

== 1924 Franklin is a Car ==
Since 2004 Bernson has shared a small recording studio with songwriter Michael Zapruder called "1924 Franklin is a Car". This space has been the main location for many of Bernson's recording projects and the site of many impromptu sessions with Zapruder. Other recording credits include work with Scott Pinkmountain, Black Fiction, The Lovely Public, Gene V. Baker, Anamude, P.A.F. and Raised By Spacemen.

== Howells Transmitter ==
Bernson is a founding member of the Howells Transmitter arts collaborative and record label. Other principal members include Jennifer Welch and Colin Held. Howells Transmitter is home to a stylistically diverse group of artists: Charles Atlas, The Fresh & Onlys, Exray's, Michael Zapruder's Rain of Frogs, Black Fiction, Scott Pinkmountain, Window Twins, Ray's Vast Basement, Modular Set and contributors to the Wiretap Music Compilation. Howells Transmitter has produced numerous plays and poetry readings, in addition to its musical endeavors.

== Discography ==
With Ray's Vast Basement

Year	Title	Notes
1998	Ray's Vast Basement	Cassette
1999	Songs from Drakesville	Cassette
2000	On the Banks of the Time	CD; Re-released with new cover in 2004
2004	By a River Burning Blue	CD
2005	Of Mice and Men	EP
2007	Starvation under Orange Trees: Label: Howells Transmitter	CD

With Window Twins

Year	Title	Notes
2009	I'm This Tall City: Label: Broken Twilight & Howells Transmitter	LP
2012	Wish: Label: Crash Symbols / Volar Records	Cassette / LP

With THEMAYS

Year	Title	Notes
2009	KNOWFI: Label: Gigante Sound	CD
2010	KNOWEYE: Label: Howells Transmitter	CD / DVD
2011	THEWORKS: Label: Self-Released	CD

With Exray's

Year	Title	Notes
2010	Ammunition Teeth: Label: Howells Transmitter	EP, cassette & digital download
2011	Exray's: Released: January 25, 2011; Label: Howells Transmitter	LP
2012	Trust a Robot: Released: June 26, 2012; Label: Howells Transmitter	Cassette / LP
2012	Ancient Thing: Released: June 26, 2012; Label: Howells Transmitter	Single

Soundtracks

Year	Title	Notes
2004	Art of Etiolation: Writer: Mia Paschal	Film
2005	In a Steel Box: Writer: Vera Freitag	Documentary
2010	The Social Network: Writer: David Fincher	Feature film, includes the Exray's song "Hesitation"

Compilations

Year	Title	Notes
2003	Surprise Partie Optimiste: Label: Vivonzeureux	LP
2004	City Sessions, Volume 1	CD
2005	Isn't it Romantic: Label: Verse Press	CD / Book
2009	Wiretap Music Presents: Covers: Label: Howells Transmitter	CD
2010	In a Cloud: New Sounds from San Francisco: Label: Secret Seven	LP
2011	City Limits Presents: San Francisco: Label: City Limits Records	LP

Sound design & coordination

Year	Title	Notes
1998	The Lucky Spot: Writer: Beth Henley	Actors Theater
1999	Spoon River Anthology: Writer: Edgar Lee Masters	Shelton Theater
2001	Snake in Fride: Writer: Brad Fraser	Actors Theater
2002	The Open Couple: Writer: Dario Fo	Expression Theater
2002	Chemistry of Change: Writer: Marlane Meyer	Actors Theater
2005	A View from the Bridge: Writer: Arthur Miller	Actors Theater
2005	Of Mice and Men: Writer: John Steinbeck	Actors Theater
2006	The Night of the Iguana: Writer: Tennessee Williams	Actors Theater
2008	Buried Child: Writer: Sam Shepard	Actors Theater
2009	The Grapes of Wrath: Writer: John Steinbeck	Actors Theater
2012	Waiting for Godot: Writer: Samuel Beckett	Tides Theatre
2012	5 Lesbians Eating a Quiche: Writer: Evan Linder and Andrew Hobgood	Tides Theatre

Production and recording

Year	Title	Notes
2005	Beached on the Half Landing: Artist: Modular Set; Label: Howells Transmitter	CD
2006	"Peg & Awl": Artist: Anamude; Label: Hinah Records	Single
2006	New Ways of Letting Go: Artist: Michael Zapruder; Label: Howells Transmitter	CD
2006	Fingerprints, Medicine: Artist: P.A.F.; Label: New World of Sound	CD
2006	Happy Holidays: Artist: Black Fiction	EP
2006	Burning Tape at the Mystery Dinner: Artist: The Lovely Public; Label: Wall of Noise	CD
2008	The Full Sun: Artist: Scott Pinkmountain; Label: Howells Transmitter	CD
2012	Situation: Artist: Future Twin; Label: Future Twin Inc.	Cassette
2012	Resist: Artist: Future Twin; Label: Future Twin Inc.	CD / Single
