= Quilt (disambiguation) =

A quilt is a quilted blanket, that is a minimum of three layers stitched together.

Quilt may also refer to:

== In general ==
- Duvet, bedding consisting of a bag filled with feathers or other material
- Quilting, a sewing technique
- Quilt art, a visual fine art

== Books ==
- The Quilt (Ismat Chughtai story)
- The Quilt, children's book by Ann Jonas 1984
- The Quilt, young adult novel by Gary Paulsen 2004
- The Quilt, novel by T. Davis Bunn 1993

== Music ==
- Quilt (band), a Boston-based psych-folk band
  - Quilt (Quilt album), 2011
- Quilt (The Shams album), 1991
- The Quilt, a hip-hop album by Gym Class Heroes

== Other ==
- Quilt (software), a system for managing patches
- "The Quilt" (TV episode), a 1989 episode of Family Matters (TV series)
- QUILTBAG, a generalization of the LGBT acronym.
