= Zapruder =

Origin
- Language: Yiddish

Zapruder is a Yiddish language surname derived from the East Slavic "запруда", referring to a weir or a dammed pond. Notable people with the name include:

- Abraham Zapruder (1905–1970), witness to the assassination of John F. Kennedy
- Alexandra Zapruder (born 1969), American author
- Matthew Zapruder (born 1967), American poet, editor, translator, and professor
- Michael Zapruder (born 1969), American musician and songwriter

== Other uses ==
- Zapruder film
- Zapruder's other films, production company of Australian comedian Andrew Denton
