= Quilt (band) =

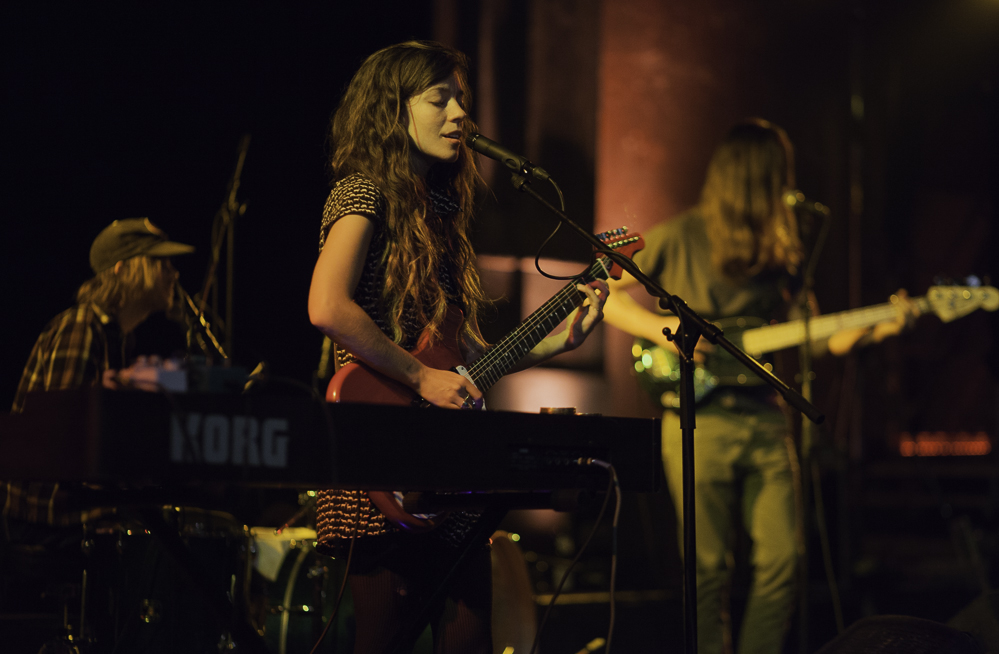
- Quilt performing in Leipzig, Germany in September 2014

Background information
- Origin: Boston
- Genres: Psychedelic rock, indie-rock, dream pop, folk
- Years active: 2009–present
- Label: Mexican Summer
- Members: Anna Fox Rochinski; Shane Butler; John Andrews; Keven Lareau
- Past members: Taylor McVay
- Website: facebook.com/quiltmusic

Quilt is a four-piece psychedelic indie rock band from Boston consisting of Anna Fox Rochinski (vocals/guitars), Shane Butler (vocals/guitars), Keven Lareau (vocals/bass) and John Andrews (vocals/drums). They have released three albums, an EP, and a handful of singles through Mexican Summer. The band tours internationally. They write collaboratively and share vocal duties. They were born out of a local improv scene, and combine elements of folk-rock, psychedelia and dream pop.

== History ==
=== Formation ===
Originally from Brookline, Massachusetts, Anna Fox Rochinski is the daughter of jazz guitarist, composer, arranger, author, and Berklee faculty member Steve Rochinski, and began to play guitar at the age of 13 with her father teaching "the basics right off the bat". She "started going to DIY shows when I was 15 or 16" years old and became part of The Whitehaus Family Record scene, which led to a chance meeting with Shane Butler and Taylor McVay, who were then playing as the folk punk duo The Good Party. It was "where our band formed and where we had our first practices" towards the end of 2008. Rochinski, Butler, and McVay all attended the School of the Museum of Fine Arts, Boston. They began to play live gigs locally, mostly on the improv circuit. Rochinski thought of the name while "looking around the room, and somehow Quilt appeared, and somehow Quilt stuck". In August of the same year, they released a seven-track demo-tape with the help of Peter Nichols at Spooky Town.

The band made their first SXSW festival appearance in March 2010, followed by the first EP, Agents of Play, released on a local Bostonian label in May of the same year. A low-key release on vinyl, it contained five tracks that highlighted the improvisational style of the band. Both Butler and Rochinski graduated in June 2010 to fully concentrate on their music, while they began playing shows along the East Coast. McVay left the band in February 2011 and was replaced by John Andrews, a New Jersey native.

=== Quilt (2011) ===
Upon finishing their studies, Butler and Rochinski began recording with Jesse Gallagher at his local Cambridge (MA) studio. Initially, McVay still participated in these sessions, but Andrews soon began to join in what was a collaborative recording process from the outset. With no budget to speak of, the band recorded when they had the opportunity to do so, which resulted in a number of scattered sessions over the course of a year. Gallagher, as the engineer and producer, played an important role in the process and "pulled us from the murky depths of scratchy and reverby lo-fi recording up in the heights of snazzier sounds and proper vocal treatments", according to Rochinski. The first result of these sessions was the single "Cowboys in the Void" b/w "Penobska Oakwalk" that appeared on Burger Records in March 2011. The band finished mixing in early September and the record was picked up by the Mexican Summer label based in New York. They quickly began to ready the self-titled album Quilt for a November release. Having a record deal brought a gear shift in public attention for the trio, who found themselves booked on the CMJ convention in October as part of their label's showcase.

The self-titled album began to garner some positive reviews in the alternative music media. After its release, the band began to tour nationwide and made forays into Canada. Over the course of 2012, the band was on the road with, among others, Young Magic and The Fresh & Onlys. They also played the occasional support slot for, among others, Lætitia Sadier. Improvisation remained an important part of the shows, with Rochinski noting "it's fun, and it balances things out nicely during a live set". The band also returned to SXSW where they appeared on the Mexican Summer stage and recorded a 5-track session for Daytrotter in October 2012.

=== Held in Splendor ===
By the start of 2013, the band had developed plans to begin recording a follow-up. Rochinski explained that while there was a strong collaborative aspect to their music, for this album they brought in "finished" songs as well. "That was a first for us. John and Shane and I all sing and write songs, and I think the album is a very good mix of our individuality and togetherness as a cohesive piece". They began rehearsing the material at the Puritan Garage in Charlestown, Boston. Quilt also teamed up with fellow Bostonians MMOSS to produce a split EP, New Hampshire Freaks, which was released in April 2013.

In April 2013, the band moved to New York City to begin recording at the Mexican Summer in-house studio together with producer Jarvis Taveniere. They spent a month recording with "friends who added saxophone and violin, cello and steel guitar". Butler explained how the experience of "having the studio, demoing the songs and knowing each other better as musicians helped make that happen". The band continued to play live shows and embarked on their first headlining tour in October 2013 in support of the single "Arctic Shark", released in the same month. In January 2014, their second album, Held in Splendor, was released. The band added Keven Lareau on bass for the headlining tour that followed. They suffered a setback when their tour van crashed in March. The band spent the rest of 2014 touring North America and Europe.

=== Plaza ===
In the first half of 2015 the band spent time recording their third album, which was completed in May. In April 2015, drummer John Andrews released a solo album Bit By the Fang,, on Woodsist Records. In the first week of November, they announced the single "Eliot St." and that their new record, entitled Plaza, would be released on February 26, 2016. The band continued to tour.

They made their national television debut on November 18, 2015, on the NBC network late night entertainment program Last Call w/ Carson Daly.

== Discography ==
=== Albums ===
- Quilt (Mexican Summer, November 2011)
- Held in Splendor (Mexican Summer, January 2014)
- Plaza (Mexican Summer, 2016)

=== EPs ===
- Agents of Play (May 2010)
- New Hampshire Freaks (April 2013) - split with MMOSS

=== Singles ===
- "Cowboys in the Void" b/w "Penobska Oakwalk" (March, 2011)
- "Tie Up the Tides"
- "Arctic Shark" b/w "As We Follow" (October, 2013)
