= Held in Splendor =

Studio album by Quilt
- Released: January 28, 2014
- Genre: Indie folk; psychedelic folk; psychedelic rock
- Length: 43:01
- Label: Mexican Summer
- Producer: Jarvis Taveniere

Quilt chronology
Quilt (2011)	Held in Splendor (2014)	Plaza (2016)

Held in Splendor is the second studio album by American psychedelic indie rock band Quilt on January 28, 2014, on Mexican Summer.

== Background and recording ==
By the start of 2013, the band had developed plans to begin recording a follow-up. Anna Fox Rochinski explained that while there was a strong collaborative aspect to their music for this album they brought in 'finished' songs as well. That was a first for us. John and Shane and I all sing and write songs, and I think the album is a very good mix of our individuality and togetherness as a cohesive piece'. They began rehearsing the material at The Puritan Garage in Charlestown, Boston. Quilt also teamed up with fellow Bostonians MMOSS to produce a split EP 'New Hampshire Freaks' which was released in April 2013.

In April 2013, the band moved to New York City to begin recording at the Mexican Summer in-house studio together with producer Jarvis Taveniere. They spent a month recording 'invited friends who added saxophone and violin, cello and steel guitar'. Butler explained how the experience of 'having the studio, demoing the songs and knowing each other better as musicians helped make that happen'.

Their second studio album Held in Splendor was released on January 28, 2014.

== Tour ==
During the album's recording, the band continued to play live shows and had embarked on their first headlining tour in October 2013 in support of the single 'Arctic Shark', released in the same month.

The band added Keven Lareau on bass for the headlining tour that followed. They suffered a setback when their tour van crashed in March. The band spent the rest of 2014 touring North America and Europe.

== Critical reception ==
Professional ratings
Aggregate scores
Source	Rating
Metacritic	74/100
Review scores
Source	Rating
AllMusic	4/5 stars
Consequence of Sound	C+
The Guardian	3/5 stars
musicOMH	3/5 stars
NME	8/10
Pitchfork	7.0/10
Spin	8/10
Under the Radar	7/10 stars

Held in Splendor received favorable reviews from contemporary music critics. At Metacritic, which assigns a normalized rating out of 100 to reviews from mainstream critics, the album received an average score of 74, based on 14 reviews, which indicates "generally favorable reviews".

== Track listing ==
All tracks are written by Quilt.

No.	Title	Length
1.	"Arctic Shark"	2:37
2.	"Saturday Bride"	3:49
3.	"Eye of the Pearl"	3:17
4.	"Mary Mountain"	5:01
5.	"Tie Up the Tides"	3:33
6.	"The Hollow"	1:51
7.	"A Mirror"	2:59
8.	"Just Dust"	2:28
9.	"The World Is Flat"	2:04
10.	"Tired & Buttered"	3:00
11.	"Secondary Swan"	4:38
12.	"Talking Trains"	2:31
13.	"I Sleep in Nature"	5:13
Total length:		43:01
