= Cian Nugent =

Irish musician (born 1989)

- Born: 1989 (age 36–37)
- Origin: Dublin, Ireland
- Genres: Folk, Rock, Psychedelic
- Instruments: Guitar, bass, vocals
- Years active: 2007–present
- Labels: Woodsist, VHF, Matador, Tompkins Square

Cian Nugent (born 1989) is an Irish guitarist, vocalist, songwriter, and producer. He has played both as a solo artist and with the backing band The Cosmos as Cian Nugent & The Cosmos. He has also collaborated with musicians Steven Gunn, Conor O'Brien and Aoife Nessa Frances. He has released albums on the labels Woodsist, Matador, and VHF. His music has been described by Kitty Empire in The Observer as "pushing at the seam where psychedelia, country and the Takoma school of folk ragas meet."

== Career ==
=== (2007–2010) Cian Nugent and Childhood, Christian Lies and Slaughter ===
After releasing his self-titled debut EP, Cian Nugent, in 2007, the track When the Snow Melts And Floats Downstream was featured on the Tompkins Square compilation Imaginational Anthem Volume 3. This led to Nugent's first US tour, which was promoted by Tompkins Square Records. The tour included performances at Cake Shop, New York, NY, Bookmill, Montague, MA, and The BCA Centre, Burlington, VT.

In 2008 the live EP Childhood, Christian Lies & Slaughter was released by Belgian label audioMER. The EP was featured on NPR, who wrote: "Inspired by acoustic guitar legends like John Fahey, Nugent plays instrumental folk pieces heavy with nostalgia for early 20th-century American music." Forced Exposure wrote of the EP: "Nugent's originals (plus a cover of Buell Kazee's Anthology Of American Folk Music staple "The Wagoner's Lad") are well-served in this recording of Nugent's fourth-ever live concert."

=== (2011–2012) Doubles ===
Nugent's debut album Doubles, was released in 2011 by VHF Records. The album was met with positive reviews from music critics, with Pitchfork opining "The perfectly ebullient passages are a mix of Stravinsky, hard bop, and unrepentant pop." Entertainment.ie said of the album: "This is a warm and engaging listen for anyone who appreciates guitar played well." Writing for AllMusic, music journalist Ned Raggett stated "The various moves from unaccompanied to group effort not only help in making the contrast between the two songs more clear, they introduce a feeling of direct joy."

In September 2012, Nugent played alongside Damo Suzuki at the Incubate festival, Netherlands.

=== (2013–2015) Born with the Caul and Higher Purchase ===
Nugent's second album Born with the Caul was released in 2013 by No Quarter Records. Lead single Grass Above My Head was played on BBC 6 Music by Tom Ravenscroft and Andrew Weatherall. Writing in The New York Times, Ben Ratliff reviewed the album positively, stating: "Cian Nugent has made a genre-bending acoustic and electric second album." In a 4 star review for The Irish Times, critic Chris Jobes wrote: "Nugent's command of mood and tension and his mastery of his instrument, are a marvel." The Irish Independent wrote of the album:"Those who give it time for its magic to percolate will be richly rewarded with compositions that display a rare skill and a daring sensibility."

In August 2013, Matador Records released the single 'Hire Purchase' as part of their Going Home Alone 7" series.

In February and March 2014, Nugent opened for Angel Olsen on her tour of the US, appearing at the Great American Music Hall, San Francisco, and (Le) Poisson Rouge, New York.

In May 2014 he performed a Tiny Desk Concert for NPR.

=== (2016–2019) Night Fiction ===
Nugent's third album, Night Fiction, was released by Woodsist in 2016. Metacritic assigns the album a score of 73 based on 9 reviews, indicitating "Generally favorable reviews". Pitchfork, giving it 7.3/10, stated "This is patient music at its best." Actor Cillian Murphy played the track First Run from the album while presenting a show on BBC 6 Music.

In March 2016, Nugent went on a tour of the US and Canada with Canadian indie rock band Nap Eyes, including appearances at SXSW, in Austin, Texas, and the 2016 Vancouver Folk Music Festival.

=== (2020–2023) Live at Cafe Oto and Do I Care ===
A collaboration with Conor O'Brien on the track Do I Care was featured on the compilation album In The Echo: Field Recordings from Earlsfort Terrace, released in September 2021 by Ergodos Records.

In 2020, he released the live album Live at Cafe Oto, which was recorded at Cafe Oto in London. The album was published through Rough Trade Publishing.

He collaborated with Irish musician Aoife Nessa Frances on her 2020 debut album, Land of No Junction, co-producing the album and playing guitar.

=== (2023-Present) She Brings Me Back to the Land of the Living ===
In May 2023, No Quarter Records released Nugent's fourth album, She Brings Me Back to the Land of the Living. John Walshe of Hot Press rated the album 8/10, writing "Nugent’s meandering blend of psychedelia, folk and Americana can take a long time to work its way under the skin, but if you have the patience, it’s worth the wait." The album received a positive review in the Irish Independent, with critic John Meagher noting the "thoughtful lyrics and exquisite arrangements."

== Discography ==
=== Albums ===
- Doubles, 2011, VHF Records
- Born with the Caul, 2013, No Quarter
- Night Fiction, 2016, Woodsist
- She Brings Me Back To The Land Of The Living, 2023, No Quarter

=== Live albums ===
- Live at Cafe Oto, 2020, self-released

=== EPs ===
- Cian Nugent, 2007, self-released,

=== Live EPs ===
- Childhood, Christian Lies, and Slaughter, 2008, Incunabulum, audioMER

=== Singles ===
- Grass Above My Head / My War Blues, 2012, VHF Records
- Hire Purchase, 2013, Matador Records

=== Compilation Appearances ===
- Imaginational Anthem Volume 3, Tompkins Square Records, 2007
- In The Echo: Field Recordings from Earlsfort Terrace, Ergodos Records, 2021
