= How to Survive In + In the Woods =

How to Survive In + In The Woods

Studio album by Woods
- Released: November 6, 2007
- Genre: Folk rock; freak folk
- Length: 41:18
- Label: Woodsist

Woods chronology
At Rear House (2007)	How to Survive In + In The Woods (2007)	Woods Family Creeps (2008)

How to Survive In + In The Woods is the second studio album by the American band Woods, released in 2007 on Woodsist.

== Track listing ==
No.	Title	Length
1.	"Holes"	1:58
2.	"Kid's Got Heart"	2:45
3.	"How To Survive In"	3:16
4.	"8-5 5-10"	1:59
5.	"Silence Is Golden"	3:17
6.	"Keep It On"	3:18
7.	"God Hates The Faithless"	4:01
8.	"Angel's Trumpet"	5:01
9.	"Broke"	2:45
10.	"I Get By"	1:50
11.	"In The Woods"	3:04
12.	"Make Time For Kitty"	3:20
13.	"Holier Than No One"	5:06
Total length:		39:31
