= The Skygreen Leopards =

American psychedelic folk band

The Skygreen Leopards are an American psychedelic folk band from San Francisco.

== History ==
The band was founded in 2001 as an improvisational ensemble by two musicians from the San Francisco Bay Area, Glenn Donaldson and Donovan Quinn. They were part of an association of musicians called the Jewel Antler Collective, which also included the members of the band Wooden Wand. After self-releasing several albums and EPs in the early 2000s, the group signed with Jagjaguwar Records, releasing the first of several albums with the label, Life & Love in Sparrow's Meadow, in 2005.

After 2009, the group was mostly inactive for several years, and during this time Quinn worked with Ben Chasney of the group Six Organs of Admittance. In 2014, the group signed with Woodsist and released a new full length, Family Crimes. They compiled some of their earlier work on The Jingling World of Skygreen Leopards in 2018.

== Discography ==
Full-lengths

- I Dreamt She Rode on a Pink Gazelle and Other Dreams (Self-released, 2001)
- The Story of the Green Lamb & the Jerusalem Priestess of Leaves (Self-released, 2002)
- One Thousand Bird Ceremony (Soft Abuse, 2004)
- Life & Love in Sparrow's Meadow (Jagjaguwar, 2005)
- Child God in the Garden of Idols (Jagjaguwar, 2005)
- The Skygreen Leopards Sing the Songs of the Lindner Brothers (Self-released, 2006)
- Disciples of California (Jagjaguwar, 2006)
- Gorgeous Johnny (Jagjaguwar, 2009)
- Family Crimes (Woodsist, 2014)

EPs

- Jehovah Surrender (Jagjaguwar, 2005)

Compilations

- The Jingling World of Skygreen Leopards (Soft Abuse, 2018)
