= Magic Trick (band) =

San Francisco-based indie rock band

- Origin: San Francisco, California, U.S.
- Genres: Indie rock, psychedelic folk
- Years active: 2011–present
- Labels: Hardly Art, Empty Cellar, Spiritual Pajamas
- Members: Tim Cohen; James Kim; Alicia Vanden Heuvel; Noelle Cahill

Magic Trick is an American indie rock band from San Francisco, California, led by Tim Cohen of The Fresh & Onlys. The band grew out of Cohen's solo project and released its first album under the Magic Trick name, The Glad Birth of Love, in 2011.

The band's lineup has included Cohen on vocals and guitar, James Kim on drums, Alicia Vanden Heuvel on bass, and Noelle Cahill on vocals.

Magic Trick's second album, Ruler of the Night, was released by Hardly Art in June 2012 and received generally favorable reviews. The band later released River of Souls (2013) and Other Man's Blues (2016) on Empty Cellar Records, and Half Man Half Machine (2015) on Spiritual Pajamas.

== Discography ==
- The Glad Birth of Love (Empty Cellar, 2011)
- Ruler of the Night (Hardly Art, 2012)
- River of Souls (Empty Cellar, 2013)
- Half Man Half Machine (Spiritual Pajamas, 2015)
- Other Man's Blues (Empty Cellar, 2016)
