= Strange to Explain =

Studio album by Woods
- Released: May 22, 2020
- Length: 47:33
- Label: Woodsist
- Producers: Jarvis Taveniere; Jeremy Earl

Woods chronology
| Love Is Love (2017) | Strange to Explain (2020) | Perennial (2023) |

Professional ratings
Aggregate scores
| Source | Rating |
|---|---|
| AnyDecentMusic? | 7.2/10 |
| Metacritic | 80/100 |
Review scores
| Source | Rating |
| AllMusic | 4.5/5 stars |
| Beats Per Minute | 72% |
| Exclaim! | 5/10 |
| Flood Magazine | 7/10 |
| Gigwise | 7/10 |
| Paste | 7.3/10 |
| Pitchfork | 7.5/10 |
| Under the Radar | 7.5/10 |

Strange to Explain is the eleventh studio album by American folk rock band Woods. It was released on May 22, 2020, under Woodsist.

== Critical reception ==
Strange to Explain was met with "generally favorable" reviews from critics. At Metacritic, which assigns a weighted average rating out of 100 to reviews from mainstream publications, this release received an average score of 80, based on 11 reviews.

== Track listing ==
Strange to Explain track listing
| No. | Title | Length |
|---|---|---|
| 1. | "Next to You and the Sea" | 3:53 |
| 2. | "Where Do You Go When You Dream" | 5:51 |
| 3. | "Before They Pass By" | 2:50 |
| 4. | "Can't Get Out" | 5:18 |
| 5. | "Strange to Explain" | 3:34 |
| 6. | "The Void" | 2:12 |
| 7. | "Just to Fall Asleep" | 5:44 |
| 8. | "Fell So Hard" | 4:01 |
| 9. | "Light of Day" | 3:19 |
| 10. | "Be There Still" | 3:35 |
| 11. | "Weekend Wind" | 7:16 |
| Total length: | | 47:33 |
