= John Andrews & The Yawns =

American indie rock band

John Andrews & the Yawns
- Origin: United States
- Genres: Indie rock, folk rock, psychedelic pop, lo-fi
- Years active: 2011–present
- Labels: Woodsist, Earth Libraries
- Member of: Cut Worms, Quilt
- Formerly of: Woods
- Members: John Andrews

John Andrews & the Yawns is an American indie rock band led by singer-songwriter and multi-instrumentalist John Andrews. The project is known for its blend of indie rock, folk rock, psychedelic pop, and lo-fi music, along with Andrews' understated songwriting and DIY production style.

The band has released albums through labels including Woodsist and Earth Libraries and has received coverage from publications such as Stereogum, Aquarium Drunkard, BrooklynVegan, KEXP, and Uncut.

== History ==
John Andrews began recording and performing under the name John Andrews & the Yawns in the early 2010s while also playing with the Brooklyn-based psychedelic folk band Woods. Andrews later became associated with singer-songwriter Max Clarke's project Cut Worms, contributing as both a touring and recording musician.

The group's early releases established a relaxed and homespun style that critics compared to 1970s folk rock and independent cassette-era recordings. Andrews also became known for incorporating visual art and hand-painted animation into the band's aesthetic.

In 2021, the band released Cookbook, which received favorable reviews from independent music publications.

In 2023, Andrews was interviewed by The Aquarian about Love For The Underdog, record stores, and independent music culture.

In 2026, the band released Streetsweeper through Earth Libraries. The album was inspired in part by Andrews' work for the New York City Parks Department while living in Brooklyn's Red Hook neighborhood. Reviews highlighted the album's observational lyrics, understated arrangements, and melodic songwriting.

Uncut magazine awarded Streetsweeper an 8/10 rating in its March 2026 issue, describing Andrews as a specialist in "low-key indie folk" and comparing aspects of the album's sound to the English band The Clientele.

Singles released ahead of the album included "Something To Be Said" and "Goodbye Dirty Snow", both of which premiered online in early 2026.

== Musical style ==
John Andrews & the Yawns have been described as combining indie rock, folk rock, psychedelic pop, and lo-fi production aesthetics. Critics have noted Andrews' conversational songwriting, mellow vocal delivery, and emphasis on melody and analog textures.

== Discography ==
=== Studio albums ===
- Bit By the Fang (2015)
- Bad Posture (2017)
- Cookbook (2021)
- Love for the Underdog (2023)
- Streetsweeper (2026)
