= Plaza (album) =

Studio album by Quilt
- Released: February 26, 2016
- Recorded: Spring 2015
- Studios: Gary's Electric Studio, Brooklyn, New York
- Genres: Indie folk; psychedelic folk
- Length: 40:42
- Label: Mexican Summer
- Producer: Jarvis Taveniere

Quilt chronology
Held in Splendor (2014)	Plaza (2016)

Singles from Plaza
- 1. "Eliot St." Released: November 4, 2015; 2. "Roller" Released: January 12, 2016

Plaza is the third studio album by American psychedelic indie rock band Quilt, released on February 26, 2016 on Mexican Summer.

== Release ==
The album was preceded by the singles "Eliot St." and "Roller". A music video for "Roller" was released on February 11, 2016 and a music video for "Padova" was released on May 26, 2016.

== Critical reception ==
Professional ratings
Aggregate scores
Source	Rating
Metacritic	76/100
Review scores
Source	Rating
AllMusic	4/5 stars
Clash	7/10
DIY	4/5 stars
The Line of Best Fit	7.5/10
musicOMH	3/5 stars
Paste	8.0/10
Pitchfork	7.7/10
Spin	6/10
Under the Radar	7/10 stars

Plaza received favorable reviews from contemporary music critics. At Metacritic, which assigns a normalized rating out of 100 to reviews from mainstream critics, the album received an average score of 76, based on 14 reviews, which indicates "generally favorable reviews".

Zach Hollwedel of Under the Radar praised the album, stating, "From the opening riff in "Passerby" to the closing bars of "Own Ways," it is a record from another era, one that deepens and expands with each consecutive listen, as it recalls the likes of Jefferson Airplane and even, on occasion, later and trippier Beatles. But for all its reverence of what's come before, the psych-rock album is as much a product of today as it is a throwback to flower power. Plaza is a richly layered, full-bodied record that impressively harnesses four-part harmonies and grade-A songwriting." Ross Jones of DIY gave the album a favorable review, stating, "In boldly delving into their pop sensibilities, the group have created an album that encompasses their intriguing convictions for different genres and refined it into a record of high quality." Heather Phares of AllMusic gave the album a favorable review, stating, "Even if Quilt don't always find the answers they're looking for on Plaza, they've found some of their most confident and cohesive music."

Anna Gaca of Spin was more critical of the album, stating, "None of Plaza is bad. It's carefully and competently constructed, palatable but perilously short on whimsy. The cover image, a drawing by the late Los Angeles contemporary artist Ken Price, is awfully easy on the eyes. But Quilt's newly straight-laced psych simply doesn't hold the interest of its current peers, whether it's Amen Dunes' drunken confessionals or Widowspeak's dreamy intimacy. Folk-pop has moved on, while Quilt has evened out. They're still searching, but the mystery's already been solved." Graeme Marsh of musicOMH gave the album an average review, stating, "Whilst Held in Splendor was seen as major progress, Plaza as a whole feels more like a band treading water in the middle of a psychedelic ocean wondering which way the land lies. It would be lazy to arrive at the conclusion that it's simply down to a gaping divide between those tracks led by Rochinski's sultry tones and those where the lead vocals come from her male companions, but it is strikingly obvious that those songs are where an appreciation for Plaza should probably begin."

== Track listing ==
No.	Title	Length
1.	"Passersby"	4:15
2.	"Roller"	4:14
3.	"Searching For"	3:07
4.	"O'Connor's Barn"	4:10
5.	"Eliot St."	4:31
6.	"Hissing My Plea"	4:25
7.	"Something There"	3:46
8.	"Padova"	4:02
9.	"Your Island"	2:49
10.	"Own Ways"	5:23
Total length:		40:42
