= Perennial (Woods album) =

Studio album by Woods
- Released: September 15, 2023
- Studio: Panoramic House, Stinson Beach, California
- Genre: Indie rock
- Length: 44:15
- Label: Woodsist
- Producer: Jarvis Taveniere; Jeremy Earl

Woods chronology
Strange to Explain (2020)	Perennial (2023)

Perennial is the twelfth studio album by American folk rock band Woods, released on September 15, 2023, under Woodsist. It received acclaim from critics.

== Background and recording ==
Woods frontman Jeremy Earl worked on loops by himself that he sent to the other band members, who then wrote songs around the loops, with guitarist Jarvis Taveniere recording and mixing the album.

== Critical reception ==
Professional ratings
Aggregate scores
Source	Rating
Metacritic	80/100
Review scores
Source	Rating
AllMusic	4.5/5 stars
Mojo	4/5 stars
Uncut	7/10
Loud and Quiet	6/10
PopMatters	7/10

Perennial received a score of 80 out of 100 on review aggregator Metacritic based on six critics' reviews, indicating "generally favorable reviews". Mojo called it "organic, evergreen loveliness", while Uncut felt that "the abundance of dreamy, placid wonders like 'Between the Past' and the instrumental 'White Wonder Melody' doesn't entirely negate one's longing for more of the ferocious, Ira Kaplan-worthy shredding that fills the final moments of 'Another Dream' or other touches that add a wobblier, woozier feel to the proceedings".

Fred Thomas of AllMusic wrote that Perennial "finds the group expanding once more, turning in some of their most ornate production while maintaining their signature earthen songwriting style", calling it "another step forward" for Woods. Glide Magazine's Shawn Donohue summarized it as "another collection of easy breezy efforts that continue the band's style, offering pretty instrumentals next to grooving indie rock", concluding that its "easy-going vibes and layers of sound win the day".

== Track listing ==
Perennial track listing
No.	Title	Length
1.	"The Seed"	3:40
2.	"Between the Past"	4:34
3.	"Another Side"	6:00
4.	"White Winter Melody"	4:35
5.	"Sip of Happiness"	4:35
6.	"Little Black Flowers"	3:19
7.	"Day Moving On"	4:10
8.	"The Wind Again"	3:37
9.	"Weep"	3:35
10.	"Double Dream"	3:43
11.	"Perennial"	2:27
Total length:		44:15

== Personnel ==
- Jeremy Earl – vocals, guitar, drums, percussion, Mellotron, vibraphone, autoharp, loops, producer
- Jarvis Taveniere – guitar, bass, organ, vocals, producer, mixing
- Timothy Stollenwerk – mastering
- Connor Gallaher – pedal steel guitar
- John Andrews – piano, organ, Mellotron, drums, vocals
- Kyle Forester – saxophone
