= City Sun Eater in the River of Light =

Studio album by Woods
- Released: April 8, 2016
- Studio: Thump (Brooklyn, New York)
- Length: 42:19
- Label: Woodsist

Woods chronology
With Light and with Love (2014)	City Sun Eater in the River of Light (2016)	Love Is Love (2017)

Singles from City Sun Eater in the River of Light
- 1. "Sun City Creeps" Released: January 12, 2016; 2. "Can't See at All" Released: February 18, 2016; 3. "Morning Light" Released: March 23, 2016

City Sun Eater in the River of Light is the ninth studio album by the American band Woods, released on April 8, 2016, on Woodsist.

The album was preceded by the singles "Sun City Creeps", "Can't See at All", and "Morning Light".

== Critical reception ==
Professional ratings
Aggregate scores
Source	Rating
Metacritic	78/100
Review scores
Source	Rating
AllMusic	4/5 stars
Consequence of Sound	B−
Drowned in Sound	8/10
The Line of Best Fit	7.5/10
The Observer	3/5 stars
Pitchfork	7.6/10
PopMatters	6/10 stars
Q	4/5 stars
Uncut	4/5 stars
Under the Radar	8/10 stars

City Sun Eater in the River of Light received largely positive reviews from contemporary music critics. At Metacritic, which assigns a normalized rating out of 100 to reviews from mainstream critics, the album received an average score of 78, based on 13 reviews, which indicates "generally favorable reviews".

Michael Wojtas of Under the Radar praised the album, stating, "Humble consistency and commitment to craft have long been Woods' defining virtues, so the boldness of the band's ninth full-length, City Sun Eater in the River of Light, is an invigorating rush. Without entirely abandoning the psych-folk influences that have colored prior releases, City Sun Eater dives into the grittier side of '70s jazz fusion, the darkest corridors of dub, and funk's paranoiac underbelly. In contrast to the bucolic preceding works, it's an album that summons big city dread, the kind that steams up from beneath the streets and clings to teeming throngs of pedestrians." Wojitas continues, "Undoubtedly, Jarvis Taveniere, a multi-instrumentalist and the band's regular producer, deserves credit for his role in architecting City Sun Eater's sound, but Woods have never sounded more like a fully-functioning unit. Every single layer here swims together to create an unceasingly fluid song cycle of ebb-and-flow paranoia and pleasure"

Tim Sendra of AllMusic gave the album a favorable review, stating, "The chances they take and the choices they make might leave their more conservative fans behind. Anyone willing to make the leap with the band will find that the adventurousness and exploration displayed by all involved pay off with yet another impressive Woods album to add to their collection." Dan Lucas of Drowned in Sound also gave the album a favorable review, stating, "Woods succeed by not ensconcing their songs in a generic, lazy wall of sound. While not inherently a bad thing, all too often it’s a lazy shortcut to immersion and a lot of the band’s fellow Brooklynites are guilty of falling into; these guys deserve credit for eschewing the easy route."

Jeff Strowe of PopMatters, in a less favorable review, asserted that Woods did not take their experimentation far enough, stating, "Woods haven’t quite carved that spot out but they have put in enough quality work to earn the right to play with the formula. There are glimpses of risk here and there on City Sun Eater but a few more curveballs could really be the remedy that brings home a larger reward."

=== Accolades ===
Publication	Accolade	Year	Rank
Rough Trade	Albums of the Year	2016	55

== Track listing ==
No.	Title	Length
1.	"Sun City Creeps"	5:58
2.	"Creature Comfort"	3:47
3.	"Morning Light"	4:10
4.	"Can't See at All"	4:45
5.	"Hang It on Your Wall"	2:12
6.	"The Take"	5:37
7.	"I See in the Dark"	4:05
8.	"Politics of Free"	3:36
9.	"The Other Side"	4:04
10.	"Hollow Home"	4:05
Total length:		42:19

== Personnel ==
Main personnel

- Jeremy Earl – vocals, guitar, mandolin, drums, percussion, SK-5 keyboard
- Jarvis Taveniere – bass
- Aaron Neveu – drums, bass, Wurlitzer organ
- John Andrews – piano, organ, Rhodes keyboard, vocals
- Jon Catfish Delorme – pedal steel guitar
- Alec Spiegelman – saxophone, flute
- Cole Karmen-Green – trumpet

Additional personnel

- Jarvis Taveniere – recording, production, mixing
- Jeremy Earl – production
- Timothy Stollenwerk – mastering
