= The Sandwitches =

- Origin: San Francisco, California
- Genres: Folk, Rock, Psychedelic
- Years active: 2008–present
- Labels: Turn Up Records, Hardly Art, Empty Cellar, Secret Seven, 1-2-3-4 Go! Records, South Paw

The Sandwitches are an American garage-folk band integral to the indie rock scene of San Francisco, where they are based. Local musicians, such as The Fresh & Onlys, Sonny Smith, and Tim Cohen have had The Sandwitches’ vocals featured on their recordings and performances.

== Music ==
The Sandwitches formed in 2008 while Heidi Alexander and Grace Cooper were singing backup vocals for San Francisco psych-rockers The Fresh & Onlys. Drummer, Roxy Brodeur (formerly of Pillars of Silence) joined shortly thereafter. As all three members take singing duties, the band is known for their use of harmonies to an eerily beautiful effect. In 2009 they released their first album ‘’How To Make Ambient Sadcake’’, released on San Francisco’s Turn Up Records. While touring their debut, Lance Kramer of the local band The Beat Cops took over drumming duties, and Brodeur took a year-long break from the band. Their follow-up, Mrs. Jones’ Cookies, welcomed back Roxy and was released on Empty Cellar records. They have released a string of 7’’s on labels such as Hardly Art (a Sub Pop imprint), 1-2-3-4 Go! Records, and South Paw.

Grace Cooper writes solo material as Grace Sings Sludge. She has released two cassette tapes on San Francisco label, Secret Seven.

In 2010, Grace and Heidi collaborated with Sonny Smith on his 100 Records multimedia art installation. They sang on Sonny’s song “I Want To Do It” as the fictional band Earth Girl Helen Brown. This collaboration yielded another recording, the Story Of An Earth Girl EP, released on Forest Family Records in 2011.

They have toured the United States a number of times with acts such as Thee Oh Sees and Sonny & The Sunsets, and in 2011 toured the UK and Europe.

== Discography ==
=== LPs ===
- Our Toast (Empty Cellar, 2015)
- Mrs. Jones' Cookies (Empty Cellar, 2011)
- How To Make Ambient Sadcake (Turn Up, 2009)

=== EPs ===
- Duck Duck Goose 12-inch (Empty Cellar, 2010)

=== Singles ===
- The Pearl 7-inch (Hardly Art, 2011)
- Summer of Love 7-inch (1-2-3-4 Go!, 2010)
- Makes Me Sick 7-inch (South Paw, 2010)
- Back To The Sea 7-inch (South Paw, 2009)

=== Compilations ===
- City Limits Presents: San Francisco 12-inch (City Limits, 2011)
- In A Cloud: New Sounds From San Francisco (Secret Seven, 2010)

=== Collaborations ===
- Sonny Smith - Sonny & The Sandwitches 7-inch EP (Empty Cellar, 2010)
