= At Echo Lake =

Studio album by Woods
- Released: May 4, 2010
- Genre: Indie rock; freak folk
- Length: 29:22
- Label: Woodsist

Woods chronology
Songs of Shame (2009)	At Echo Lake (2010)	Sun and Shade (2011)

Professional ratings
Review scores
Source	Rating
AllMusic	4/5 stars
Pitchfork	8.0/10
Drowned in Sound	7/10
Sputnikmusic	3.5/5

At Echo Lake is the fifth studio album by the band Woods. Pitchfork Media placed it at number 31 on its list "The Top 50 Albums of 2010."

== Track listing ==
No.	Title	Length
1.	"Blood Dries Darker"	4:29
2.	"Pick Up"	2:28
3.	"Suffering Season"	3:06
4.	"Time Fading Lines"	3:39
5.	"From the Horn"	2:04
6.	"Death Rattles"	3:24
7.	"Mornin' Time"	1:52
8.	"I Was Gone"	1:54
9.	"Get Back"	2:05
10.	"Deep"	1:59
11.	"Til the Sun Rips"	2:23
Total length:		29:22
