= List of National Geographic original features =

The following is a list of feature films or documentaries broadcast by National Geographic, for either National Geographic Channel, Nat Geo Wild, or Disney+.

== about nat geo ==
=== Upcoming ===
Title	Genre	Release date	Channel
Inside the FBI: The '70s	Documentary	TBA	National Geographic Channel

=== 2026 ===
Title	Genre	Release date	Channel
Time and Water	Documentary	31 July 2026	National Geographic Channel
Ghost Elephants	Documentary	7 March 2026	National Geographic Channel

=== 2025 ===
Title	Genre	Release date	Channel
Incas: The Rise and Fall	Documentary	28 December 2025	National Geographic Channel
Chris Hemsworth: A Road Trip to Remember	Documentary	22 November 2025	National Geographic Channel
Love + War	Documentary	7 November 2025	National Geographic Channel
Cleopatra's Final Secret	Documentary	25 September 2025	National Geographic Channel
Dolphins Up Close with Bertie Gregory	Documentary	18 September 2025	National Geographic Channel
Lost Treasures of Arabia: Nabataean Kingdom	Documentary	29 August 2025	National Geographic Channel
Shark Quest: Hunt for the Apex Predator	Documentary	13 July 2025	Nat Geo Wild
Sharks of the North	Documentary	12 July 2025	Nat Geo Wild
Jaws @ 50: The Definitive Inside Story	Documentary	10 July 2025	National Geographic Channel
Sharks Up Close with Bertie Gregory	Documentary	5 July 2025	Nat Geo Wild
Sally	Documentary	16 June 2025	National Geographic Channel
Ocean with David Attenborough	Documentary	7 June 2025	National Geographic Channel
Titanic: The Digital Resurrection	Documentary	11 April 2025	National Geographic Channel
Magic of the Disney Treasure	Documentary	28 March 2025	National Geographic Channel
Yellowstone Wolves: Succession	Documentary	17 January 2025	National Geographic Channel
Magic of Disney Lookout Cay at Lighthouse Point	Documentary	17 January 2025	National Geographic Channel

=== 2024 ===
Title	Genre	Release date	Channel
Megastructures: Real Madrid Super Stadium	Documentary	4 December 2024	National Geographic Channel
Endurance	Documentary	1 November 2024	National Geographic Channel
The Devil's Climb	Documentary	17 October 2024	National Geographic Channel
Expedition Amazon	Documentary	10 October 2024	National Geographic Channel
Blink	Documentary	4 October 2024	National Geographic Channel
Fly	Documentary	2 September 2024	National Geographic Channel
Sugarcane	Documentary	9 August 2024	National Geographic Channel
Attack of the Red Sea Sharks	Documentary	7 July 2024	Nat Geo Wild
Baby Sharks in the City	Documentary	2 July 2024	Nat Geo Wild
Sharks Gone Viral	Documentary	1 July 2024	Nat Geo Wild
Supersized Sharks	Documentary	1 July 2024	Nat Geo Wild
Shark Beach with Anthony Mackie	Documentary	30 June 2024	Nat Geo Wild
Shark vs. Ross Edgley	Documentary	30 June 2024	Nat Geo Wild
Clotilda: The Return Home	Documentary	17 June 2024	National Geographic Channel
Protecting Paradise: The Story of Niue	Documentary	7 June 2024	National Geographic Channel
The Real Red Tails	Documentary	3 June 2024	National Geographic Channel
Billy & Molly: An Otter Love Story	Documentary	6 May 2024	National Geographic Channel
EPCOT Becoming: Inside the Transformation	Documentary	27 April 2024	National Geographic Channel
The Space Race: The Untold Story of the First Black Astronauts	Documentary	12 February 2024	National Geographic Channel

=== 2023 ===
Title	Genre	Release date	Channel
Inferno: France's Deadly Heatwave	Documentary	1 November 2023	National Geographic Channel
Explorer: Lake of Fire	Documentary	26 October 2023	National Geographic Channel
The Mission	Documentary	13 October 2023	National Geographic Channel
9/11: Where Were You? Never Forget	Documentary	10 September 2023	National Geographic Channel
Explorer: Lost in the Arctic	Documentary	24 August 2023	National Geographic Channel
Bobi Wine: The People's President	Documentary	28 July 2023	National Geographic Channel
Bull Shark Bandits	Documentary	2 July 2023	Nat Geo Wild
Bull Shark vs. Hammerhead	Documentary	2 July 2023	Nat Geo Wild
Return of the White Shark	Documentary	2 July 2023	Nat Geo Wild
Saved From a Shark	Documentary	2 July 2023	Nat Geo Wild
Shark Below Zero	Documentary	2 July 2023	Nat Geo Wild
Shark Eat Shark	Documentary	2 July 2023	Nat Geo Wild
Sharks vs. Dolphins: Bahamas Battleground	Documentary	2 July 2023	Nat Geo Wild
Pride From Above	Documentary	2 June 2023	National Geographic Channel
Charles: In His Own Words	Documentary	28 April 2023	National Geographic Channel
Lost Treasures of Arabia: The Ancient City of Dadan	Documentary	13 March 2023	National Geographic Channel
Wild Life	Documentary	12 March 2023	National Geographic Channel
Ukraine War From the Air	Documentary	27 February 2023	National Geographic Channel
Titanic: 25 Years Later with James Cameron	Documentary	5 February 2023	National Geographic Channel

=== 2022 ===
Title	Genre	Release date	Channel
Making the Wish: Disney's Newest Cruise Ship	Documentary	25 December 2022	National Geographic Channel
The Flagmakers	Documentary	21 December 2022	National Geographic Channel
Retrograde	Documentary	8 December 2022	National Geographic Channel
The Territory	Documentary	2 December 2022	National Geographic Channel
Fire of Love	Documentary	11 November 2022	National Geographic Channel
9/11: Missing Carmen Rivera	Documentary	11 September 2022	National Geographic Channel
Super Frenchie: Adventure Calls	Documentary	9 September 2022	National Geographic Channel
Narco Wars: Drugs in America	Documentary	25 August 2022	National Geographic Channel
Raging Bull Shark (short)	Documentary	17 August 2022	Nat Geo Wild
Narco Wars: Queenpins	Documentary	14 August 2022	National Geographic Channel
Sky Sharks	Documentary	10 August 2022	Nat Geo Wild
Jaws Invasion	Documentary	19 July 2022	Nat Geo Wild
World's Biggest Hammerhead?	Documentary	18 July 2022	Nat Geo Wild
Jaws vs. Boats	Documentary	17 July 2022	Nat Geo Wild
Shark Side of the Moon	Documentary	14 July 2022	Nat Geo Wild
Sharks That Eat Everything	Documentary	14 July 2022	Nat Geo Wild
Polar Worlds with Bertie Gregory	Documentary	13 July 2022	Nat Geo Wild
Shark Queens	Documentary	13 July 2022	Nat Geo Wild
Counting Jaws	Documentary	12 July 2022	Nat Geo Wild
Maui Shark Mystery	Documentary	11 July 2022	Nat Geo Wild
Shark Superpower	Documentary	10 July 2022	Nat Geo Wild
Camo Sharks	Documentary	4 July 2022	Nat Geo Wild
Wild Coasts	Documentary	8 June 2022	Nat Geo Wild
Explorer: The Deepest Cave	Documentary	30 May 2022	National Geographic Channel
We Feed People	Documentary	27 May 2022	National Geographic Channel
Explorer: The Last Tepui	Documentary	22 April 2022	Disney+
The Biggest Little Farm: The Return	Documentary	22 April 2022	Disney+
Gorongosa: Paradise Reborn	Documentary	22 April 2022	Nat Geo Wild
Wild Coasts	Documentary	22 April 2022	Nat Geo Wild
Clotilda: Last American Slave Ship	Documentary	7 February 2022	National Geographic Channel
The Way of the Cheetah	Documentary	6 February 2022	Nat Geo Wild

=== 2021 ===
Title	Genre	Release date	Channel
Hitler's Disastrous Desert War	Documentary	3 December 2021	National Geographic Channel
The Emirates From Above (short)	Documentary	2 December 2021	National Geographic Channel
The First Wave	Documentary	19 November 2021	National Geographic Channel
The Rescue	Documentary	8 October 2021	National Geographic Channel
King Tut in Color	Documentary	18 June 2020	National Geographic Channel
Lost Cities: Megacity of the Maya Warrior King	Documentary	17 September 2021	National Geographic Channel
Fauci	Documentary	10 September 2021	National Geographic Channel
Torn	Documentary	2 September 2021	National Geographic Channel
Bios: Andres Calamaro	Documentary	31 August 2021	National Geographic Channel (Argentina)
Playing with Sharks	Documentary	23 July 2021	Disney+
World's Biggest Bull Shark?	Documentary	13 July 2021	Nat Geo Wild
Shark Attack Investigation: The Paige Winter Story	Documentary	12 July 2021	Nat Geo Wild
Rogue Shark?	Documentary	9 July 2021	Nat Geo Wild
Shark Gangs	Documentary	9 July 2021	Nat Geo Wild
World's Most Dangerous Shark?	Documentary	9 July 2021	Nat Geo Wild
The Croc That Ate Jaws	Documentary	8 July 2021	Nat Geo Wild
Shark Beach with Chris Hemsworth	Documentary	5 July 2021	Nat Geo Wild
Rise Again: Tulsa and the Red Summer	Documentary	18 June 2021	National Geographic Channel
Inside North Korea: Cyber State	Documentary	1 June 2021	National Geographic Channel
Our America: Asian Voices	Documentary	20 May 2021	National Geographic Channel
Heroes of the Ocean	Documentary	22 April 2021	National Geographic Channel
Own the Room	Documentary	12 March 2021	Disney+
Built For Mars: The Perseverance Rover	Documentary	21 February 2021	National Geographic Channel
The March on Washington: Keepers of the Dream	Documentary	18 February 2021	National Geographic Channel
Flooded Tombs of the Nile	Documentary	5 February 2021	National Geographic Channel
Ghost of the Minerva	Documentary	27 January 2021	National Geographic Channel

=== 2020 ===
Title	Genre	Release date	Channel
The Ghosts Above	Documentary	2 December 2020	National Geographic Channel
Going Viral: From Ebola to COVID-19	Documentary	30 November 2020	National Geographic Channel
The Real Right Stuff	Documentary	20 November 2020	Disney+
Inside North Korea: The Next Leader	Documentary	8 November 2020	National Geographic Channel
Rebuilding Paradise	Documentary	8 November 2020	National Geographic Channel
Blood on the Wall	Documentary	1 November 2020	National Geographic Channel
Buried Secrets of Keros	Documentary	1 November 2020	National Geographic Channel
The Last Ice	Documentary	24 October 2020	National Geographic Channel
Blood on the Wall	Documentary	30 September 2020	National Geographic Channel
Lost and Found (short)	Documentary	18 September 2020	National Geographic Channel
Assignment: Inspiration	Documentary	17 September 2020	National Geographic Channel
The Night Crawlers (short)	Documentary	13 September 2020	National Geographic Channel
Bin Laden's Hard Drive	Documentary	10 September 2020	National Geographic Channel
Jade Eyed Leopard	Documentary	7 September 2020	National Geographic Channel
Being the Queen	Documentary	31 August 2020	National Geographic Channel
Sharks vs. Dolphins: Blood Battle	Documentary	19 August 2020	Nat Geo Wild
Shark vs. Whale	Documentary	28 July 2020	Nat Geo Wild
50 Shades of Sharks	Documentary	17 July 2020	Nat Geo Wild
What the Shark?	Documentary	17 July 2020	Nat Geo Wild
Secrets of the Bull Shark	Documentary	16 July 2020	Nat Geo Wild
Most Wanted Sharks	Documentary	15 July 2020	Nat Geo Wild
Sharkcano	Documentary	15 July 2020	Nat Geo Wild
Sharks of the Bermuda Triangle	Documentary	14 July 2020	Nat Geo Wild
World's Biggest Tiger Shark	Documentary	14 July 2020	Nat Geo Wild
Shark vs. Surfer	Documentary	13 July 2020	Nat Geo Wild
Patagonia Wings	Documentary	4 July 2020	National Geographic Channel
Akashinga: The Brave Ones (short)	Documentary	17 June 2020	National Geographic Channel
Race Against Pandemic	Documentary	14 June 2020	National Geographic Channel
Chasing the Equinox	Documentary	5 June 2020	National Geographic Channel
An Unfinished Symphony (short)	Documentary	22 May 2020	National Geographic Channel
Heroes of the Sky: The Mighty Eighth Air Force	Documentary	22 May 2020	National Geographic Channel
Still Human	Documentary	21 May 2020	National Geographic Channel
WWII in Europe: Voices from the Front	Documentary	21 May 2020	National Geographic Channel
An Unfinished Symphony	Documentary	20 May 2020	National Geographic Channel
Into the Fire (short)	Documentary	20 May 2020	National Geographic Channel
Lost on Everest	Documentary	15 May 2020	National Geographic Channel
Jane Goodall: The Hope	Documentary	22 April 2020	National Geographic Channel
Saving Notre-Dame	Documentary	16 April 2020	National Geographic Channel
Back to the Titanic	Documentary	23 February 2020	National Geographic Channel
Lost Temple of the Inca	Documentary	4 February 2020	National Geographic Channel
Mars: One Day on the Red Planet	Documentary	5 January 2020	National Geographic Channel
Buried Secrets of the Cordoba	Documentary	Unknown	National Geographic Channel

=== 2019 ===
Title	Genre	Release date	Channel
Ocean's Breath	Documentary	25 December 2019	National Geographic Channel
The Archaeological Mysteries Of The Equinox	Documentary	1 December 2019	National Geographic Channel
Pompeii: Secrets of the Dead	Documentary	24 November 2019	National Geographic Channel
The Lost Empire of Easter Island	Documentary	24 November 2019	National Geographic Channel
Mission to the Sun	Documentary	19 November 2019	National Geographic Channel
Sharks of Lost Island	Documentary	19 November 2019	National Geographic Channel
Ultimate Viking Sword	Documentary	3 November 2019	National Geographic Channel
Women of Impact: Changing the World	Documentary	26 October 2019	National Geographic Channel
Expedition Amelia	Documentary	20 October 2019	National Geographic Channel
The Cave	Documentary	18 October 2019	National Geographic Channel
9/11: Control the Skies	Documentary	11 September 2019	National Geographic Channel
World's Biggest Bull Shark?	Documentary	21 July 2019	Nat Geo Wild
Sea of Shadows	Documentary	12 July 2019	National Geographic Channel
The Armstrong Tapes	Documentary	8 July 2019	National Geographic Channel
Man vs. Shark	Documentary	17 July 2019	Nat Geo Wild
Great Shark Chow Down	Documentary	15 July 2019	Nat Geo Wild
Cannibal Sharks	Documentary	14 July 2019	Nat Geo Wild
The Armstrong Tapes	Documentary	8 July 2019	National Geographic Channel
Apollo: Missions to the Moon	Documentary	7 July 2019	National Geographic Channel
Eyewitness: D-Day	Documentary	4 June 2019	National Geographic Channel
Going Viral: Beyond the Hot Zone	Documentary	27 May 2019	National Geographic Channel
Inside the Internet: 50 Years of Life Online	Documentary	4 May 2019	National Geographic Channel
Queen Elizabeth: Legacy to the Natural World	Documentary	23 April 2019	National Geographic Channel
Notre-Dame: Race Against the Inferno	Documentary	15 April 2019	National Geographic Channel
Drain the Oceans: Deep Dive	Documentary	8 April 2019	National Geographic Channel
Guerilla Gold Rush: The Spoils of War	Documentary	3 April 2019	National Geographic Channel
Jaguar Beach Battle	Documentary	11 March 2019	Nat Geo Wild
The Lost Tomb of Alexander the Great	Documentary	4 March 2019	National Geographic Channel
Riddle of the Stone Age Giants	Documentary	24 February 2019	National Geographic Channel
Deepwater Horizon: In Their Own Words	Documentary	17 February 2019	National Geographic Channel
Into the Grand Canyon	Documentary	9 February 2019	National Geographic Channel
Oil Spill of the Century	Documentary	1 January 2019	National Geographic Channel
Building the Channel Tunnel	Documentary	Unknown	National Geographic Channel
Houses of the Mediterranean	Documentary	Unknown	National Geographic Channel
The Lost City of Machu Picchu	Documentary	Unknown	National Geographic Channel

=== 2018 ===
Title	Genre	Release date	Channel
Paris to Pittsburgh	Documentary	12 December 2018	National Geographic Channel
MARS: Inside SpaceX	Documentary	12 November 2018	National Geographic Channel
Curiosity: Life of a Mars Rover	Documentary	4 November 2018	National Geographic Channel
Egypt's Sun King: Secrets and Treasures	Documentary	21 October 2018	National Geographic Channel
Free Solo	Documentary	28 September 2018	National Geographic Channel
Martin Luther King Jr.: Marked Man	Documentary	4 September 2018	National Geographic Channel
Mafia Confidential	Documentary	29 July 2018	National Geographic Channel
Big Sharks Rule	Documentary	16 July 2018	Nat Geo Wild
Shark vs. Tuna	Documentary	16 July 2018	Nat Geo Wild
The Whale That Ate Jaws: New Evidence	Documentary	15 July 2018	Nat Geo Wild
700 Sharks	Documentary	9 June 2018	Nat Geo Wild
Maradona Confiential	Documentary	2 June 2018	National Geographic Channel
Drain the Oceans	Documentary	28 May 2018	National Geographic Channel
Operation Royal Wedding	Documentary	23 May 2018	National Geographic Channel
Into the Okavango	Documentary	22 April 2018	National Geographic Channel
Hubble's Cosmic Journey	Documentary	21 March 2018	National Geographic Channel
Lost Treasures of the Mayan Snake King	Documentary	6 February 2018	National Geographic Channel
Science Fair	Documentary	20 January 2018	National Geographic Channel
Chain of Command	Documentary	15 January 2018	National Geographic Channel
Easter Island Unsolved	Documentary	Unknown	National Geographic Channel

=== 2017 ===
Title	Genre	Release date	Channel
Drain Alcatraz	Documentary	19 December 2017	National Geographic Channel
Heroes of the Long Road Home with Martha Raddatz	Documentary	17 December 2017	National Geographic Channel
Man Among Cheetahs	Documentary	11 December 2017	National Geographic Channel
Titanic: 20 Years Later with James Cameron	Documentary	26 November 2017	National Geographic Channel
Jane	Documentary	20 October 2017	National Geographic Channel
Shark vs. Predator	Documentary	23 July 2017	National Geographic Channel
Drain the Sunken Pirate City	Documentary	9 July 2017	National Geographic Channel
Earth Live	Documentary	9 July 2017	National Geographic Channel
LA 92	Documentary	28 April 2017	National Geographic Channel
Atlantis Rising	Documentary	29 January 2017	National Geographic Channel
1917: One Year, Two Revolutions	Documentary	Unknown	National Geographic Channel
Bruce Lee: Curse of the Dragon	Documentary	Unknown	National Geographic Channel
Bruce Lee: The Man and the Legend	Documentary	Unknown	National Geographic Channel
Kingdom of the Apes: Battle Lines	Documentary	Unknown	Nat Geo Wild
The Chinese Hajj	Documentary	Unknown	National Geographic Channel

=== 2016 ===
Title	Genre	Release date	Channel
Egypt's Treasure Guardians	Documentary	28 December 2016	National Geographic Channel
Expedition Mars: Spirit and Opportunity	Documentary	16 November 2016	National Geographic Channel
Before the Flood	Documentary	21 October 2016	National Geographic Channel
Drain the Ocean: WWII	Documentary	19 September 2016	National Geographic Channel
9/11: The Plane That Hit the Pentagon	Documentary	10 September 2016	National Geographic Channel
Mega Hammerhead	Documentary	26 June 2016	Nat Geo Wild
Sharkatratz	Documentary	26 June 2016	Nat Geo Wild
Drain the Titanic	Documentary	5 May 2016	National Geographic Channel
The Challenger Disaster: The Lost Tapes	Documentary	25 January 2016	National Geographic Channel
Indy Motor Speedway	Documentary	Unknown	National Geographic Channel

=== 2015 ===
Title	Genre	Release date	Channel
Cougars Undercover	Documentary	27 November 2015	Nat Geo Wild
2000's Greatest Tragedies	Documentary	30 August 2015	National Geographic Channel
Generation YouTube	Documentary	11 July 2015	National Geographic Channel
United Sharks of America	Documentary	5 July 2015	Nat Geo Wild
Tree Climbing Lions	Documentary	3 July 2015	Nat Geo Wild
Drain the Titanic	Documentary	12 April 2015	National Geographic Channel

=== 2014 ===
Title	Genre	Release date	Channel
Drain the Bermuda Triangle (Short)	Documentary	7 December 2014	National Geographic Channel
100% Planes	Documentary	18 November 2014	National Geographic Channel
9/10: The Final Hours	Documentary	7 September 2014	National Geographic Channel
9/11 Rescue Cops	Documentary	4 September 2014	National Geographic Channel
Drugs, Inc.: Dealer Pov	Documentary	3 September 2014	National Geographic Channel
Wild Japan: Snow Monkeys	Documentary	20 July 2014	National Geographic Channel
Miracle Landing on the Hudson	Documentary	1 June 2014	National Geographic Channel
Shark Kill Zone	Documentary	Unknown	Nat Geo Wild

=== 2013 ===
Title	Genre	Release date	Channel
JFK: Seven Days That Made a President	Documentary	11 November 2013	National Geographic Channel
Killing Kennedy	Drama	10 November 2013	National Geographic Channel
9/11 Firehouse	Documentary	8 September 2013	National Geographic Channel
Blow Your Mind	Documentary	7 July 2013	National Geographic Channel
Ancient Computer	Documentary	3 April 2013	National Geographic Channel
Ultimate Tutankhamun	Documentary	10 February 2013	National Geographic Channel

=== 2012 ===
Title	Genre	Release date	Channel
Cesar Millan: The Real Story	Documentary	25 November 2012	National Geographic Channel
Comic Store Heroes	Documentary	13 July 2012	National Geographic Channel
American Doomsday	Documentary	6 July 2012	National Geographic Channel
Cradle of the Gods	Documentary	1 March 2012	National Geographic Channel
Bruce Lee Lives!	Documentary	7 February 2012	National Geographic Channel

=== 2011 ===
Title	Genre	Release date	Channel
Drain the Great Lakes	Documentary	11 December 2011	National Geographic Channel
Finding the Next Earth	Documentary	1 December 2011	National Geographic Channel
JFK: The Lost Bullet	Documentary	18 November 2011	National Geographic Channel
Finding Atlantis	Documentary	9 November 2011	National Geographic Channel
9/11: Where Were You?	Documentary	30 August 2011	National Geographic Channel
George W. Bush: The 9/11 Interview	Documentary	28 August 2011	National Geographic Channel
Catacombs of Palermo	Documentary	4 July 2011	National Geographic Channel
Titanic: The Final Word with James Cameron	Documentary	8 April 2011	National Geographic Channel
Ben Franklin's Pirate Fleet	Documentary	6 April 2011	National Geographic Channel
Hunt for the Abominable Snowman	Documentary	5 April 2011	National Geographic Channel
Bruce Lee, The Legend	Documentary	17 January 2011	National Geographic Channel
Colombia's Gold War	Documentary	Unknown	National Geographic Channel

=== 2010 ===
Title	Genre	Release date	Channel
Journey to Shark Eden	Documentary	24 September 2010	Nat Geo Wild
Churchill's German Army	Documentary	18 August 2010	National Geographic Channel
Big Sur: Wild California	Documentary	14 March 2010	National Geographic Channel
China's Ghost Army	Documentary	Unknown	National Geographic Channel
The Last Secrets of Nasca	Documentary	Unknown	National Geographic Channel
My 9/11	Documentary	Unknown	National Geographic Channel

=== 2009 ===
Title	Genre	Release date	Channel
Drain the Ocean	Documentary	9 August 2009	National Geographic Channel
Easter Island Underworld	Documentary	9 June 2009	National Geographic Channel
Hawaii: Rivers of Fire	Documentary	Unknown	National Geographic Channel

=== 2008 ===
Title	Genre	Release date	Channel
Boxing Behind Bars	Documentary	10 November 2008	National Geographic Channel
Earth: The Power of the Planet	Documentary	13 July 2008	National Geographic Channel
Caught Barehanded	Documentary	3 June 2008	National Geographic Channel
Caught in the Act: Battle at Kruger	Documentary	11 May 2008	National Geographic Channel
Aftermath: Population Zero	Documentary	9 March 2008	National Geographic Channel

=== 2007 ===
Title	Genre	Release date	Channel
Struck by Lightning	Documentary	7 April 2007	National Geographic Channel
Cain and Abel: Brothers at War	Documentary	5 April 2007	National Geographic Channel
Inside North Korea	Documentary	27 February 2007	National Geographic Channel

=== 2006 ===
Title	Genre	Release date	Channel
Triple Cross: Bin Laden's Spy in America	Documentary	28 August 2006	National Geographic Channel

=== 2005 ===
Title	Genre	Release date	Channel
Bioterror Alert	Documentary	1 November 2005	National Geographic Channel
African Megaflyover	Documentary	Unknown	National Geographic Channel
Crime Scene Bangkok	Documentary	Unknown	National Geographic Channel

=== 2004 ===
Title	Genre	Release date	Channel
Beyond the Movie: Alexander the Great	Documentary	24 October 2004	National Geographic Channel
D-Day: Men and Machines	Documentary	3 May 2004	National Geographic Channel

=== 2003 ===
Title	Genre	Release date	Channel
Beyond the Movie: The Lord of the Rings: Return of the King	Documentary	21 December 2003	National Geographic Channel

=== 2002 ===
Title	Genre	Release date	Channel
Blinding Horizon	Documentary	October 2002	National Geographic Channel
Beetle Battles: Kwang Bang	Documentary	Unknown	National Geographic Channel

=== 2001 ===
Title	Genre	Release date	Channel
Beyond the Movie: The Lord of the Rings: The Fellowship of the Ring	Documentary	23 December 2001	National Geographic Channel
Inside the Vatican	Documentary	21 November 2001	National Geographic Channel
Beyond the Movie: Pearl Harbour	Documentary	1 June 2001	National Geographic Channel

=== 1997 ===
Title	Genre	Release date	Channel
Asteroids: Deadly Impact	Documentary	20 February 1997	National Geographic Channel

=== 1984 ===
Title	Genre	Release date	Channel
Among the Wild Chimpanzee	Documentary	30 January 1984	National Geographic Channel
