= JFK: The Lost Bullet =

Production
- Running time: 120 minutes
- Production company: National Geographic Channel

Original release
- Network: National Geographic Channel
- Release: 2011

JFK: The Lost Bullet is a documentary by National Geographic Channel first shown on the National Geographic in late 2011. It tries to answer what happened to the first bullet fired at John F Kennedy. It re-evaluates the famous Zapruder film that shows the murder of JFK and states that Zapruder stopped filming and missed the first shot fired which changes the timeline of the bullets fired making it possible that the first bullet hit a traffic signal. The documentary also features other home movies taken on the day.

== See also ==
- Max Holland
- Single-bullet theory
- John F. Kennedy assassination conspiracy theories
