= Blood Oaths of the New Blues =

Studio album by Wooden Wand
- Released: January 8, 2013
- Genre: Pop
- Length: 40:44
- Label: Fire Records

Wooden Wand chronology
Duke/Wand (2012)	Blood Oaths of the New Blues (2013)

Professional ratings
Aggregate scores
Source	Rating
Metacritic	77/100
Review scores
Source	Rating
Allmusic	4/5 stars
Pitchfork	7.9/10

Blood Oaths of the New Blues is the fourteenth studio album by American musician Wooden Wand, a.k.a. James Jackson Toth. It was released in January 2013 under Fire Records.

== Track list ==
No.	Title	Length
1.	"No Bed for Beatle Wand/Days This Long"	11:47
2.	"Outsider Blues"	6:53
3.	"Dome Community People (Are Good People)"	1:23
4.	"Dungeons of Irons"	2:37
5.	"Supermoon"	3:52
6.	"Southern Colorado Song"	6:11
7.	"Jhonn Balance"	6:04
8.	"No Debts"	1:57
