= Tim Cohen =

- Also known as: Feller Quentin, Smif Carnivorous, Magic Trick, AmocomA
- Origin: Syracuse, New York
- Genres: Folk, Rock, Hip Hop, Experimental
- Years active: 2002 – present
- Labels: Empty Cellar, Captured Tracks, Secret Seven

Tim Cohen is a San Francisco based musician and visual artist. He has played in a variety of acts including The Fresh & Onlys, Black Fiction, 3 Leafs, Amocoma, Sonny & The Sunsets, Hattattak, The Latter, and The Forest Fires Collective. He also releases solo albums, first as Feller Quentin, then under his own name and, more recently, Magic Trick. He has been recognized as a figurehead in San Francisco's independent garage and psychedelic rock music scenes.

== Music ==
Tim Cohen is widely recognized for the prolific and eclectic nature of his work, and has released albums in genres ranging from Hip-Hop to psychedelic-folk. He has stated in several interviews that he grew up listening almost exclusively to Hip-Hop, and has recorded and performed songs in the genre both solo and in groups, The Latter and The Forest Fires Collective. His interest in other musical genres increased while attending college at Wesleyan University. After college, he moved to San Francisco where he recorded and released albums with bassist Evan Martin and several others under the names Hattattak and Feller Quentin. Martin and Cohen later formed Black Fiction, a collective of San Francisco musicians centered around the record store that Cohen worked for at the time, Amoeba Music. Tim Cohen is most well known for his work as the lead singer and co-writer in the psych-garage outfit, The Fresh & Onlys, formed with bassist Shayde Sartin after the break-up of Black Fiction. The Fresh and Onlys have released numerous 7’’s, EP’s, and LP’s on labels such as Sacred Bones, Captured Tracks, Woodsist, and In The Red, and toured extensively in the United States and Western Europe. In 2009 he released Go To Hell, a solo black metal album, under the guise, Amocoma. Jon Bernson of San Francisco band Exrays and Cohen record and perform together as Window Twins.

Tim Cohen has recorded four solo LP’s and one EP. The first, The Two Sides of Tim Cohen was released in 2009 and was a split release by San Francisco labels Empty Cellar and Secret Seven. Brooklyn’s Captured Tracks released the follow-up, 2010’s Laugh Tracks, along with 2011’s Tim Cohen’s Magic Trick and its accompanying EP, Bad Blood. Later that year, Cohen returned to Empty Cellar to release The Glad Birth of Love, a four-song, 43 minute LP under his new moniker, Magic Trick. In August 2016 Magic Trick released the album Other Man's Blues that also featured James Kim, Alicia Van Heuvel, and Noelle Cahill.

Cohen is known for his home recording style, and has served as the audio engineer on many of The Fresh & Onlys' releases, the debut Wet Illustrated 7", and all of his solo works.

== Visual art ==
Tim Cohen is also a visual artist. He produces drawings and paintings, and his work has been featured as part of group shows in San Francisco, South Carolina, and Berlin, Germany. Cohen is responsible for the artwork featured on many of his solo albums. One of his pieces was used as a t-shirt design for Soundscreen Design's "Musician as Designer" collection.

== Discography ==
=== Feller Quentin ===
- I Want To Be Black Kind Of (self-released, 2002)
- Cat In A Tree With A Mouse In His Teeth (self-released, 2003)
- I Am Not A Monster (Echelon Productions, 2004)

=== AmocomA ===
- Go To Hell (tUMULt, 2009)

=== Tim Cohen ===
==== LPs ====
- The Two Sides of Tim Cohen (Empty Cellar/Secret Seven, 2009)
- Laugh Tracks (Captured Tracks, 2010)
- Tim Cohen's Magic Trick (Captured Tracks, 2011)
- Luck Man (Sinderlyn, 2017)
- The Modern World (Sinderlyn, 2018)
- You Are Still Here (Bobo Integral, 2021)
- Strawberry Hill (2000 records, 2024)

==== EPs ====
- Bad Blood 2x7" (Captured Tracks, 2011)

==== Compilations ====
- In A Cloud: New Sounds From San Francisco (Secret Seven, 2010)
- City Limits Presents: San Francisco (City Limits, 2011)
- "100 Records Volume 2: I Miss The Jams" (Turn Up, 2011)
- In A Cloud II: New Sounds From San Francisco (Secret Seven, 2012)

=== Magic Trick ===
- The Glad Birth of Love (Empty Cellar, 2011)
- Ruler of the Night (Hardly Art, 2012)
- River of Souls (2013)
- Half Man Half Machine (2015)
- Other Man's Blues (Empty Cellar, 2016)
