= Songs of Shame =

Studio album by Woods
- Released: April 9, 2009
- Genre: Folk rock; Psychedelic folk
- Length: 35:41
- Label: Woodsist; Shrimper
- Producer: Jeremy Earl, Jarvis Taveniere

Woods chronology
Woods Family Creeps (2008)	Songs of Shame (2009)	At Echo Lake (2010)

Songs of Shame is the fourth album by the American band Woods, released on April 9, 2009, on Woodsist and on April 14, 2009, on Shrimper Records. The album was recorded by the band at Jarvis Taveniere's studio, Rear House, in Brooklyn.

== Critical reception ==
Professional ratings
Aggregate scores
Source	Rating
Metacritic	79/100
Review scores
Source	Rating
AllMusic	4/5 stars
Pitchfork	8.3/10
PopMatters	8/10 stars
Spin	8/10
Tiny Mix Tapes	2.5/5 marks

Songs of Shame received largely positive reviews from contemporary music critics. At Metacritic, which assigns a normalized rating out of 100 to reviews from mainstream critics, the album received an average score of 79, based on 6 reviews, which indicates "generally favorable reviews".

Matthew Murphy of Pitchfork Media gave the album a positive review, stating, "Despite Woods' humble production values and their fondness for living room ambiance, Songs of Shame has that almost subliminal ability to make one want to move in to listen more closely. And once you've been drawn in for a good listen, it becomes difficult not to want to come back for many more."

Rob McCallum of PopMatters praised the album, stating, "It’s interesting that a collective known for releasing mix tapes of their main influences manages to go to portray these so clearly on their own recordings, yet never fall foul of relying too heavily upon the hybrid of nostalgia they pool from. “Gypsy Hand” gives Songs of Shame the scuzzed-out, guitar-laden ending it so deserves before “Where and What Are You ?” allows the record to meander off into a freak Fleet Fox-esque vocally harmonious closure. Each individual track on Songs of Shame manages to develop not only as the album progresses, but with each time the LP is played, with new favourites manifesting themselves with each listen, a sign of a truly great album."

Brendan Mahoney of Tiny Mix Tapes was rather critical of the album, stating, "Too often though, on this record and elsewhere, the disconnected vocals lazily substitute for things like artistic honesty and substance. Woods borrow somewhat vaguely from that vaguest of genres, indie rock, and the whole project seems a bit, well, rootless. If they decide to get serious about being a band and not just a project, maybe next record they could take us to their own personal woods, instead of just telling us about boring generalized woods. You know what I’m saying?"

== Track listing ==
No.	Title	Length
1.	"To Clean"	2:18
2.	"The Hold"	2:42
3.	"The Number"	2:52
4.	"September with Pete"	9:42
5.	"Down This Road"	1:37
6.	"Military Madness"	3:13
7.	"Born to Lose"	2:00
8.	"Echo Lake"	2:02
9.	"Rain On"	3:30
10.	"Gypsy Hand"	4:26
11.	"Where and What Are You?"	1:24
Total length:		35:41
