= Bend Beyond =

Studio album by Woods
- Released: September 18, 2012
- Genres: Indie folk; psych-folk; neo-psychedelia; psychedelic rock
- Length: 32:07
- Label: Woodsist

Woods chronology
Sun and Shade (2011)	Bend Beyond (2012)	With Light and with Love (2014)

Bend Beyond is the seventh album by the American band Woods, released in September 2012 by Woodsist and Remote Control Records.

The album is the last to feature the band's bassist, Kevin Morby.

== Critical reception ==
Professional ratings
Aggregate scores
Source	Rating
Metacritic	78/100
Review scores
Source	Rating
AllMusic	4/5 stars
Consequence of Sound	4/5 stars
Filter	80%
The Fly	4.5/5 stars
NME	7/10
Paste	8.2/10
Pitchfork	8.1/10
PopMatters	7/10

Bend Beyond received largely positive reviews from contemporary music critics. At Metacritic, which assigns a normalized rating out of 100 to reviews from mainstream critics, the album received an average score of 78, based on 21 reviews, which indicates "generally favorable reviews".

Steven Hyden of Pitchfork gave the album a positive review, stating, "Fans of Woods' "spontaneous energy" might lament the relative straight-forwardness of Bend Beyond. But Woods' greatest strength has always been songwriting, and sharpening the focus and cleaning up the production has only enhanced the band's welcoming melodies. Besides, it's about time this chronically undervalued group broadened its audience a bit. After Bend Beyond, there are plenty of other great Woods records that await neophytes."

Philip Cosores of Paste praised the album, stating, "Where Bend Beyond is most successful is revealed in the album’s final two numbers. You can take away Woods’ undeniable chops and the trademark textures created by tape-effects wizard G. Lucas Crane, and Earl could still effectively elate listeners with the immediate infectiousness of a song like “Impossible Sky.” And, quickly moving from images of technicolor sunsets and evocations of the possibilities of youth, Earl closes on the haunting “Something Surreal,” where his unwavering, wordless falsetto brings the listener back to earth; the songs together run the gamut of human emotion in about five minutes. It's a brief culmination of practice making perfect, with Earl and his band showing why they make a new album every year—because more and more often they are getting it right."

Billy Hamilton of Drowned in Sound was more critical of the album and its cohesiveness, stating, "In hindsight, front-loading the record with Bend Beyond probably wasn’t the smartest of steps for a band refashioning its image. Its formidable peak was always going to dominate handclapping toe-tappers like 'Lily'. Yet, there’s still a lot to admire here. As a whole, Bend Beyond is as full and broad as Woods have ever sounded. Sure, it lacks the adventure promised by its opening gambit, but this is a band shaping its ambitions at a gradual pace. As Jeremy Earl puts it: “It ain’t easy looking for different ways to make things stay the same”."

== Track listing ==
No.	Title	Length
1.	"Bend Beyond"	4:25
2.	"Cali in a Cup"	3:21
3.	"Is It Honest?"	2:38
4.	"It Ain't Easy"	2:23
5.	"Cascade"	1:55
6.	"Back to the Stone"	2:53
7.	"Find Them Empty"	2:15
8.	"Wind Was the Wine"	1:29
9.	"Lily"	2:09
10.	"Size Meets the Sound"	3:01
11.	"Impossible Sky"	3:02
12.	"Something Surreal"	2:36
Total length:		32:07

== Charts ==
Chart (2012)	Peak position
US Americana/Folk Albums (Billboard)	21
