= At Rear House =

Studio album by Woods
- Released: January 16, 2007
- Genre: Folk rock; freak folk
- Length: 41:56
- Label: Woodsist

Woods chronology
At Rear House (2007)	How to Survive In + In The Woods (2007)

Professional ratings
Review scores
Source	Rating
PopMatters	8/10 stars

At Rear House is the debut studio album by the American band Woods, released in 2007 on Woodsist.

== Track listing ==
No.	Title	Length
1.	"Don't Pass on Me"	2:56
2.	"Hunover"	2:54
3.	"Keep It On"	2:55
4.	"Be Still"	4:07
5.	"Woods Children, Pt. 2"	2:37
6.	"Ring Me to Sleep"	2:33
7.	"Night Creature"	4:13
8.	"Walk the Dogs"	5:59
9.	"Love Songs for Pigeons"	3:35
10.	"Bone Tapper"	3:55
11.	"Picking Up the Pieces"	6:13
