= Anna Fox Rochinski =

American musician

Anna Fox Rochinski is an American musician from Brooklyn, New York. Rochinski is a member of the band Quilt.

== History ==
Rochinski has been a member of the band Quilt since its inception in 2009. In January 2021, Rochinski announced her debut solo album, Cherry, would be released on March 26. In addition to announcing the album, Rochinski shared the title track. In February 2021, Rochinski released the second single from the album, titled No Better. In March 2021, Rochinski shared the third single from the album, Everybody's Down. The album received a positive review from Pitchfork.

== Discography ==
Studio albums

- Cherry (2021, Don Giovanni Records)
