= Sun and Shade =

Studio album by Woods
- Released: June 14, 2011
- Genres: Folk; psychedelic folk
- Length: 44:16
- Label: Woodsist

Woods chronology
At Echo Lake (2010)	Sun and Shade (2011)	Bend Beyond (2012)

Singles from Sun and Shade
- 1. "Pushing Onlys" Released: April 1, 2011; 2. "Out of the Eye" Released: May 16, 2011

Sun and Shade is the sixth studio album by the American folk rock band Woods. It was released on June 14, 2011, by Woodsist.

== Background ==
Sun and Shade was recorded at the Woodsist headquarters in Warwick, New York, with American musician Glenn Donaldson.

== Release ==
On March 11, 2011, Woods announced the release of their album Sun and Shade.

=== Singles ===
Woods released the first single "Pushing Onlys" on April 1, 2011.

The second single "Out of the Eye" was released on May 16, 2011.

== Tour ==
In support of the album, Woods went on tour, starting on May 28, 2011 at Xfinity Theatre (originally Concast Theatre) in Hartford, Connecticut, and finishing at the Scala nightclub in London, England on September 8, 2011. The band went on a tour of America later that year in December 2011.

== Critical reception ==
Professional ratings
Aggregate scores
Source	Rating
Metacritic	77/100
Review scores
Source	Rating
The 405	8.5/10
AllMusic	4.5/5 stars
The A.V. Club	B
Beats Per Minute	82%
Consequence of Sound	B
Drowned in Sound	7/10
Loud and Quiet	8/10
Paste	6.8/10
Pitchfork	7.9/10
PopMatters	5/10

Sun and Shade was met with "generally favorable" reviews from critics. At Metacritic, which assigns a weighted average rating out of 100 to reviews from mainstream publications, this release received an average score of 77 based on 17 reviews.

In a review for AllMusic, critic reviewer Tim Sendra wrote: "Woods have put it all together on Sun and Shade, matching inspiration with performance and crafting their best record yet, one that will stand with the great folk-psych albums of the past 40 years." At Consequence of Sound, Alex Young said: "On Sun and Shade, Woods’ fifth LP in as many years, the band performs their best balancing act yet by resting their wistful melodies on top of a flowing spirituality that pins the album low enough in the sky to provide just enough light to accompany the oncoming darkness." Ryan Reed of Paste gave a 6.8 out of 10 noting "every single second is bathed in charming nostalgia for a bygone era."

=== Accolades ===
Publications' year-end list appearances for Sun and Shade
Critic/Publication	List	Rank	Ref
The Line of Best Fit	The Line of Best Fit's Top 50 Albums of 2011	16	

== Track listing ==
No.	Title	Length
1.	"Pushing Onlys"	3:33
2.	"Any Other Day"	1:57
3.	"Be All Be Easy"	2:36
4.	"Out of the Eye"	7:10
5.	"Hand It Out"	3:10
6.	"To Have in the Home"	2:47
7.	"Sol y Sombra"	9:38
8.	"Wouldn't Waste"	2:38
9.	"Who Do I Think I Am"	2:49
10.	"What Faces the Sheet"	2:11
11.	"White Out"	3:55
12.	"Say Goodbye"	1:52
Total length:		44:16

== Charts ==
Chart performance for Sun and Shade
Chart (2011)	Peak position
US Heatseekers Albums (Billboard)	30
