= Blues Control =

- Origin: Queens, New York City
- Years active: 2006–2019
- Past members: Russ Waterhouse; Lea Cho
- Website: grupabluescontrol.com

Blues Control was an American experimental music duo from Queens, New York City.

Blues Control's members were Russ Waterhouse (guitar, electronics) and Lea Cho (keyboards). The group released music on a variety of formats, including vinyl, cassette, and CD-R. In 2012, their release Valley Tangents reached #5 on the Billboard Top New Age Albums chart. In 2019, the group announced they were on an indefinite extended hiatus.

== Discography ==
- Blues Control cassette (Palsy Records, 2006)
- Blues Control (Holy Mountain Records, 2007)
- A Full Tank (Managing Expectations Records, 2007)
- Puff (Woodsist, 2007)
- Local Flavor (Siltbreeze, 2009)
- FRKYWS, Vol. 8 with Laraaji (RVNG Intl., 2011)
- Riverboat Styx (Not Not Fun, 2011)
- Valley Tangents (Drag City, 2012)
