= Play It Strange =

Studio album by The Fresh & Onlys
- Released: October 12, 2010
- Genre: Indie rock
- Length: 36:37
- Label: In the Red Records

The Fresh & Onlys chronology
Grey-Eyed Girls (2009)	Play It Strange (2010)	Secret Walls (2011)

Professional ratings
Aggregate scores
Source	Rating
Metacritic	78/100
Review scores
Source	Rating
Allmusic	3.5/5 stars
The A.V. Club	A−
CMJ	(favorable)
Dusted	(favorable)
Now	(4/5)
Pitchfork Media	(8.0/10)
PopMatters	(7/10)
Spin	(8/10)
Tiny Mix Tapes	(3.5/5)
Under the Radar	(6/10)

Play It Strange is a 2010 album by the Fresh & Onlys. Pitchfork placed it at number 29 on its list "The Top 50 Albums of 2010" and the track "Waterfall" at number 57 on its list "The Top 100 Tracks of 2010".

== Track listing ==
No.	Title	Length
1.	"Summer of Love"	3:21
2.	"Waterfall"	3:12
3.	"Until the End of Time"	3:23
4.	"Tropical Island Suite"	7:48
5.	"I'm All Shook Up"	2:41
6.	"Be My Hooker"	2:20
7.	"Fascinated"	2:29
8.	"Plague of Frogs"	2:10
9.	"Who Needs a Man"	2:04
10.	"Red Light, Green Light"	3:04
11.	"I'm a Thief"	4:05
Total length:		36:38
