= Matthew Zapruder =

American poet

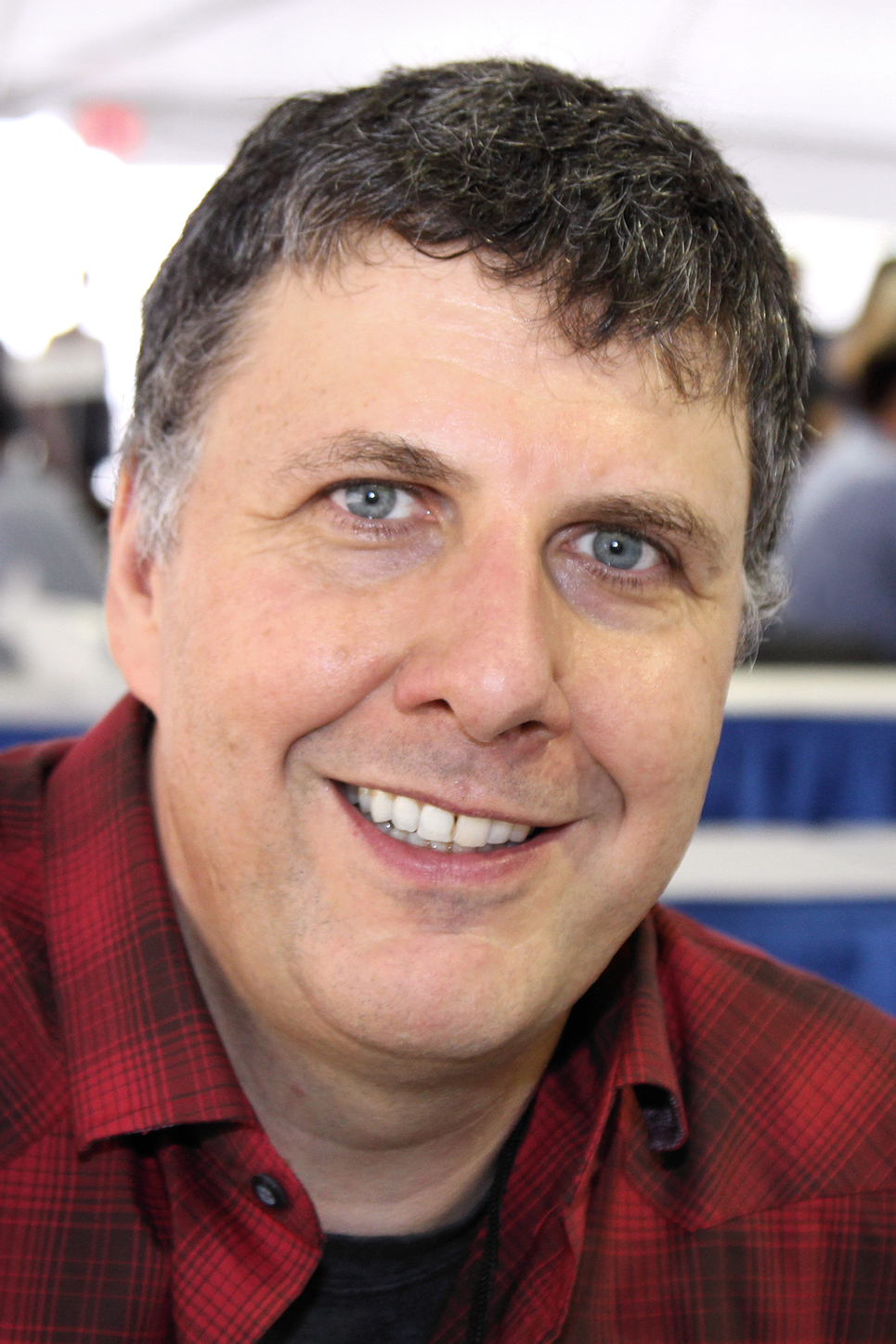
- Zapruder at the 2017 Texas Book Festival
- Born: 1967 (age 58–59); Washington, D.C., United States
- Education: Amherst College; University of California, Berkeley; University of Massachusetts Amherst
- Writing career
- Genre: Poetry
- Notable awards: 2007 William Carlos Williams Award

Matthew Zapruder (1967) is an American poet, editor, translator, and professor.

His second poetry collection, The Pajamaist, won the 2007 William Carlos Williams Award from the Poetry Society of America, and was chosen by Library Journal as one of the top ten poetry volumes of 2006. His first book, American Linden, won the Tupelo Press Editors' Prize.

== Life ==
Zapruder graduated from Bethesda-Chevy Chase High School in 1985, then received his B.A. in Russian literature from Amherst College, his M.A. in Slavic languages from the University of California, Berkeley, and his M.F.A. from the University of Massachusetts Amherst College of Humanities and Fine Arts.

He was co-founder (with Brian Henry) and editor-in-chief of Verse Press, which has since become Wave Books and moved from Amherst, Massachusetts, to Seattle, Washington. Matthew Zapruder and Joshua Beckman, who became friends when Beckman performed a reading in Amherst, are co-editors of Wave Books.

In 2003, he was a James Merrill House Fellow. In 2007, he was a writer-in-residence with the Lannan Foundation in Marfa, Texas. In 2011, he was a Guggenheim Fellow. He won the Tupelo Press Editors' Prize and the 2008 May Sarton Poetry Prize from the American Academy of Arts and Sciences.

Luxbooks published a German-language graphic novel version of his poem "The Pajamaist", translated by Ron Winkler and illustrated by Martina Hoffman. In the fall of 2012, Zapruder's poetry was adapted and performed at Carnegie Hall with composition by Gabriel Kahane and Brooklyn Rider.

His work has appeared in the Boston Review, The Believer, BOMB, McSweeney's, jubilat, Conduit, the Harvard Review, The New Republic, The New Yorker, The Paris Review, and Narrative Magazine.

He taught at New York University, The New School, the University of Houston, the University of California, Berkeley, and at the Juniper Summer Writing Institute at the University of Massachusetts Amherst. He teaches at Saint Mary's College of California and the Low Residency MFA Program at the University of California, Riverside.

He lives in the San Francisco Bay Area. He is the brother of musician Michael Zapruder and writer Alexandra Zapruder, and grandson of Abraham Zapruder. He is the guitarist in the band The Figments.

== Published works ==
=== Full-length poetry ===
- American Linden (Tupelo Press, 2002) ISBN 9780971031098
- The Pajamaist (Copper Canyon Press, 2006) ISBN 9781619320666
- Come On All You Ghosts (Copper Canyon Press, 2010) ISBN 9781556593222
- Sun Bear (Copper Canyon Press, 2014) ISBN 9781556594632
- Father's Day (Copper Canyon Press, 2019) ISBN 978-1-55659-578-3
- I Love Hearing Your Dreams (Charles Scribner's Sons, 2024) ISBN 978-1-6680-5980-7

=== Nonfiction ===
- Why Poetry (HarperCollins, 2017) ISBN 9780062343079

=== Memoir ===
- Story of a Poem: A Memoir (Unnamed Press, 2023) ISBN 978-1-951213-68-8

=== Translations ===
- Secret Weapon: The Late Poems of Eugen Jebeleanu (co-translated with Radu Ioanid, Coffee House Press, 2008) ISBN 978-1-56689-206-3

=== Anthology contributions ===
- "Matthew Zapruder" in Legitimate Dangers: American Poets of the New Century, (edited by Michael Dumanis and Cate Marvin, Sarabande Books, 2006) ISBN 978-1-932511-29-1

=== Edited anthologies ===
- The Best American Poetry 2022 (co-edited with David Lehman, Charles Scribner's Sons, 2022) ISBN 978-1-9821-8668-5
