= With Light and with Love =

Studio album by Woods
- Released: April 15, 2014
- Genres: Indie folk; alternative rock
- Length: 39:25
- Label: Woodsist
- Producers: Jarvis Taveniere, Jeremy Earl

Woods chronology
Bend Beyond (2012)	With Light and with Love (2014)	City Sun Eater in the River of Light (2016)

Singles from With Light and with Love
- 1. "Leaves Like Glass" Released: January 2, 2014

With Light and with Love is the eighth studio album by the American band Woods, released on April 15, 2014 on Woodsist. The album is the band's first following the departure of bass guitarist Kevin Morby.

The album was followed by a 7" and digital release of two non-album tracks, "Tambourine Light" and the B-side "Tomorrow's Only Yesterday".

== Critical reception ==
Professional ratings
Aggregate scores
Source	Rating
Metacritic	79/100
Review scores
Source	Rating
AllMusic	4/5 stars
Consequence of Sound	C+
Exclaim!	7/10
Mojo	4/5 stars
NME	8/10
Paste	7.8/10
Pitchfork	7.8/10
PopMatters	8/10 stars
Spin	8/10

With Light and with Love received largely positive reviews from contemporary music critics. At Metacritic, which assigns a normalized rating out of 100 to reviews from mainstream critics, the album received an average score of 79, based on 19 reviews, which indicates "generally favorable reviews".

Ian Cohen of Pitchfork Media gave the album a positive review, stating, "The versatility of Woods becomes more evident throughout the album, as they spread outwards rather than building upward: you get B3-infused soul (“Leaves Like Glass”), breezy psychedelia (“New Light”) and darker shades of American Beauty (“Shining”), giving jamband types, roots fans, folkies, indie kids and DIY fetishists a place to link up. “Breakthrough”, “masterpiece”, “bold leap”—those aren’t words that really seem applicable to With Light and With Love, or Woods for that matter, but they’re allowing themselves to be extremely likable for a larger crowd."

Fred Thomas of AllMusic praised the album, stating, "The album is easily the most solid offering from the Woods camp to date, besting even the production of its incredibly strong predecessor and presenting the songs with even more clarity and interesting choices than ever before." Carey Hodges of Paste also acclaimed the album, stating, "Even the most drawn-out, mind-bending stretches on the album serve a purpose, managing to avoid sounding like sonic filler."

Philip Cosores of Consequence of Sound was more critical of the album, stating, "While With Light and With Love might sound more instantly accessible than previous Woods albums, it also shows that it might not be a good thing for Woods to tinker with their most defining quality: the intimacy of their songs."

== Track listing ==
No.	Title	Length
1.	"Shepherd"	3:16
2.	"Shining"	2:31
3.	"With Light and with Love"	9:06
4.	"Moving to the Left"	5:22
5.	"New Light"	2:46
6.	"Leaves Like Glass"	3:31
7.	"Twin Steps"	2:35
8.	"Full Moon"	4:07
9.	"Only the Lonely"	3:22
10.	"Feather Man"	2:49
Total length:		39:25

== Personnel ==
Main personnel

- Jarvis Taveniere – bass, engineer, guitar, twelve-string guitar, electric guitar, producer
- Jeremy Earl – bass, composer, drums, guitar, twelve-string guitar, acoustic guitar, electric guitar, percussion, producer, vocals
- Aaron Neveu – bass, drums, acoustic guitar
- John Andrews – musical saw, organ, piano
- Samara Lubelski – violin
- Tim Presley – slide guitar
- Jonathan Rado – organ
- Al Carlson – engineer, mellotron, mixing

Additional personnel

- Timothy Stollenwerk – mastering
- Terry Willard Earl – photography
