= Quilt (Quilt album) =

Studio album by Quilt
- Released: November 8, 2011
- Genre: Indie folk; psychedelic folk
- Length: 40:52
- Label: Mexican Summer
- Producer: Jesse Gallagher

Quilt chronology
Quilt (2011)	Held in Splendor (2014)

Singles from Quilt
- 1. "Cowboys in the Void b/w Penobska Oakwalk" Released: March 2011

Quilt is the debut studio album by American psychedelic indie rock band Quilt, released on November 8, 2011 on Mexican Summer.

The album was engineered and produced by Jesse Gallagher in Cambridge, Massachusetts in Summer 2010 and Summer 2011 and was mastered by Jeff Lipton and mastering assistant Maria Rice in Newton, Massachusetts in Winter 2010 and Summer 2011.

== Background and recording ==
Upon finishing their studies, Shane Butler and Anna Fox Rochinki began recording with Jesse Gallagher at his local Cambridge (MA) studio. Initially, McVay still participated in these sessions, but Andrews soon began to join in what was a collaborative recording process from the outset. With no budget to speak of, the band recorded when they had the opportunity to do so, which resulted in a number of scattered sessions over the course of a year. Gallagher as the engineer and producer, played an important role in the process and "pulled us from the murky depths of scratchy and reverby lo-fi recording up in the heights of snazzier sounds and proper vocal treatments", according to Rochinski. The first result of these sessions was the single 'Cowboys in the Void' b/w 'Penobska Oakwalk' that appeared on Burger Records in March 2011. The band finished mixing in early September and the record was picked up by the Mexican Summer label based in New York. They quickly began to ready the self-titled album Quilt for a November release. Having a record deal brought a gear shift in public attention for the trio, who found themselves booked on the CMJ convention in October as part of their label's showcase.

== Tour ==
Over the course of 2012, the band was on the road with, among others, Young Magic and The Fresh & Onlys. They also played the occasional support slot for, among others, Lætitia Sadier. Improvisation remained an important part of the shows, with Rochinski noting "it's fun, and it balances things out nicely during a live set". The band also returned to SXSW where they appeared on the Mexican Summer stage and recorded a 5-track session for Daytrotter in October 2012.

== Critical reception ==
Professional ratings
Review scores
Source	Rating
AllMusic	3.5/5 stars
The A.V. Club	B
Pitchfork	7.2/10
PopMatters	7/10 stars

Quilt received favorable reviews from contemporary music critics.

Jedd Beaudoin of PopMatters gave the album a favorable review, stating, "Quilt unleashes ten tracks of memorable psychedelic-driven pop that will no doubt garner comparisons to some late '60s cult band or another, maybe even the finer moments of Jefferson Airplane." Steven Hyden of The A.V. Club gave the album a favorable review, stating, "At no point on its self-titled full-length debut does the Massachusetts trio stray from hummable melodies and easily discernible song structures. For all its "freaky" trappings, Quilt is first and foremost a pop-rock band, and judging by Quilt, it has the makings of being quite a good one." Chrysta Cherrie of AllMusic praised the album's cohesiveness, stating, "Quilt live up to their name, weaving a tapestry that’s warm in its dreamy, early-morning feel and comforting in its mantra-like delivery. Also as the name suggests -- and thanks to the band’s free approach to songwriting, letting the music flow where it may and carving out lyrics later -- the songs meld together to work like movements of one fuller piece as well as stand-alone compositions."

Emilie Friedlander of Pitchfork praised the band's musical style, stating, "Like their namesake, Quilt's music feels handmade and stitched-together, as though its creators were sifting through a collection of musical hand-me-downs and collating the bits that spoke to them into something new. This patchwork quality extends not only to their juxtaposition, say, of Neil Young bass-bounce and the kind of half-spoken poetic narration you might hear on one of The Incredible String Band's early records, but to their melodic sensibility at large, which favors tightly interlocking arrangements of simple motifs."

== Track listing ==
No.	Title	Length
1.	"Young Gold"	3:14
2.	"Cowboys in the Void"	5:23
3.	"Children of Light"	3:20
4.	"Penobska Oakwalk"	2:53
5.	"Rabid Love"	6:16
6.	"Milo"	5:53
7.	"Utopian Canyon"	3:53
8.	"Lost & Lewd"	1:50
9.	"The Silver Stairs of Ketchikan"	3:37
10.	"Gome Home"	4:33
Total length:		40:52
