= Michael Zapruder =

American musician and songwriter (born 1969)

Michael Zapruder (born 1969 in Washington, D.C.) is an American musician and songwriter. He is a recording artist, and a co-founder of San Francisco's Howells Transmitter arts collective and record label.

== Origins ==
Michael Zapruder was born in Washington, D.C. and grew up in Chevy Chase, Maryland. He is an alumnus of Bethesda-Chevy Chase High School and Hamilton College, where he studied religion and music. He spent his junior year of college living in Nepal, studying Tibetan language and religion. Upon graduating, Zapruder moved to the San Francisco Bay Area, where he now lives. His siblings are both writers, Matthew Zapruder and Alexandra Zapruder.

Zapruder holds a Master of Arts in music composition from California State University, East Bay (2014) and a Doctor of Musical Arts in composition from the University of Texas at Austin (2019).

== 52 Songs ==
In 1999, Zapruder wrote and recorded one song per week for a year in a project titled 52 Songs. During the project he released a five-song EP, Lomograph, and later assembled a compilation titled Bye Bye Beauty, which was not commercially released. Limited CD copies of the full project were produced and are now out of print.

== This Is a Beautiful Town ==
Following 52 Songs, Zapruder recorded the piano-based album This Is a Beautiful Town. The piano parts were recorded on Neil Young's piano at Broken Arrow Ranch. After the album's release, Zapruder toured the United States in support of the recording.

== New Ways of Letting Go ==
In the mid-2000s, Zapruder co-founded the Howells Transmitter collective and record label, through which he released New Ways of Letting Go, an orchestral folk album performed with the ensemble Rain of Frogs. The recording was produced by Zapruder and Jon Bernson and completed with Scott Solter. Zapruder performed in support of the release, including appearances at South by Southwest and Pop Montreal.

== Dragon Chinese Cocktail Horoscope ==
In 2009, Zapruder recorded Dragon Chinese Cocktail Horoscope with Scott Solter at Tiny Telephone Studios. Released by SideCho Records, the album received the Independent Music Award for Best Folk/Singer-Songwriter Album. A music video for "Ads for Feelings" was directed by Jesse Ewles.

== Pink Thunder ==
Completed in 2012, Pink Thunder is an album of twenty-two free-verse settings of poems by contemporary American poets including Noelle Kocot, James Tate, Bob Hicok, David Berman, D. A. Powell, and Valzhyna Mort to music. Zapruder composed and arranged the music and produced the recordings, which feature contributions from numerous musicians.

The project was released in multiple formats, including a book with accompanying CD (Black Ocean Books) and vinyl editions issued by Kora Records and Howells Transmitter. Critical reception noted the album’s unconventional combination of poetry and music. Huffigton Post called Pink Thunder "work of extraordinary merit and historical significance."

== Pink Thunder portmanteaus ==
In 2011, Zapruder presented the Pink Thunder portmanteaus at the Curiosity Shoppe in San Francisco, Rational Park in Chicago and at the AWP Conference in Washington, D.C. Created with electronic designer Mark Allen-Piccolo, the multimedia works embedded audio tracks within sculptural objects corresponding to the poems.

== 1924 Franklin is a Car ==
Since 2004, Zapruder has shared a small recording studio with songwriter Jon Bernson called 1924 Franklin is a Car. This space has been the main location for many recording projects and the site of many impromptu sessions. Other recording credits for the studio include work with Scott Pinkmountain, Black Fiction, The Lovely Public, Gene V. Baker, Anamude, P.A.F and Raised By Spacemen.

== Howells Transmitter ==
Zapruder is a founding member of the Howells Transmitter arts collaborative and record label. Other principal members include Jennifer Welch, John Bernson and Colin Held. Howells Transmitter is home to a stylistically diverse group of artists: Charles Atlas, The Fresh and Onlys, Michael Zapruder's Rain of Frogs, Black Fiction, Scott Pinkmountain, Window Twins, Ray's Vast Basement, Modular Set and contributors to the Wiretap Music Compilation. Howells Transmitter has produced numerous plays and poetry readings, in addition to its musical endeavors.

== Pandora ==
Michael Zapruder was Pandora's head music curator from 2003-2011. In 2012, he left Pandora to focus on music full-time.

== Discography ==
=== Studio albums ===
- This Is a Beautiful Town (2002, Explorable Oriole Records)
- New Ways of Letting Go (2006, Howells Transmitter)
- Dragon Chinese Cocktail Horoscope (2009, SideCho Records)
- Pink Thunder (2012, Black Ocean Books / Kora Records)
- Latecomers (2020, Howells Transmitter)

=== EPs ===
- Serious Light (2022, Howells Transmitter)

=== With Close Calls ===
- Both Side Convenience (2025, Howells Transmitter)

=== With rrunnerrss ===
- rrunnerrss (2026, Howells Transmitter)
