= Wooden Wand =

American musical project

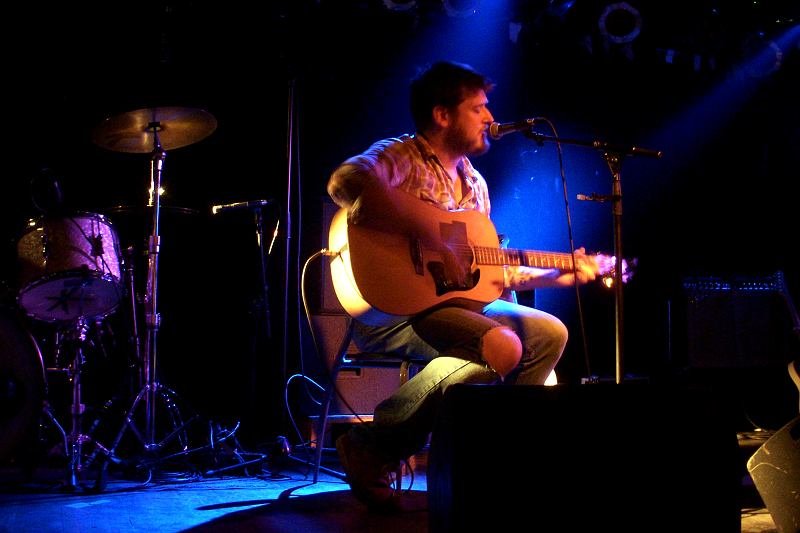
Wooden Wand in concert in Denmark (2012)

Wooden Wand is the stage name of singer-songwriter James Jackson Toth, who has recorded under his given name as well as the name WAND. The style of music recorded by Toth and his many incarnations has drawn on a variety of both conventional and experimental folk and rock influences, including psychedelic folk, freak folk and indie. Though he was a significant player in the New Weird America trend of the early to mid-2000s along with Devendra Banhart, Akron/Family, Joanna Newsom, and collaborators The Vanishing Voice, Toth has been difficult to pigeonhole in one genre; recent releases have been identified as acid folk, free jazz, outlaw country, and country-tinged rock. Toth has appeared on labels including Kill Rock Stars, Ecstatic Peace!, Rykodisc, and Young God.

Wooden Wand's collaborations have been nearly as wandering and nomadic as Toth himself, a New York native who attended Purchase College before relocating to Knoxville, Tennessee, Murfreesboro, Tennessee, and most recently Lexington, Kentucky. He has recorded with the Vanishing Voice (including ex-wife Jessica Bowen and other bandmates Jarvis Taniere and G. Lucas Crane, who went on to form (Jex Thoth) and (Woods), respectively, and Heidi Diehl), the Sky High Band, the Omen Bones Band, and the Briarwood Virgins (a Birmingham, Alabama supergroup featuring members of the Through the Sparks, Plate Six, Delicate Cutters, and Verbena). In January 2013, Fire Records in the UK released Wooden Wand's latest record Blood Oaths of the New Blues, which was the second album recorded with the Briarwood Virgins band in Birmingham in February 2012.

Swans frontman and head of Young God Records Michael Gira stated that James Jackson Toth's “got that picaresque quality that Dylan had in his heyday, wherein the shambolic narrator undergoes various travails and epiphanies — harrowing, bleak and darkly comical — in the course of a narrative, then leaves you mystified, both smiling and sad.”

== Discography ==
=== Cassettes ===
- Book of FM (Polyamory)
- Folk Audio Tapes Vol. 1 (WWVV #1)
- Live At Pasture reissue (Skullfucking Tapes)
- Michel's Portal and Crow Jane Variations (Fuckit Tapes)
- Split with Kasvien Ystavat (Polyamory)
- Ogre 99: Live In Fort Collins (Was Ist Das?)

=== CD-R ===
- Angel Hair (Chocolate Monk)
- Live At Pasture (tour only) (23 Productions)
- Supplication Jam for Brother Greh 3-inch CD-R (Chondritic Sound)
- Town on the Edge of Darkness (Audiobot)
- From The Road Vol. 1 - Born Free (23 Productions)
- From The Road Vol. 2 - The Philosophy of Fuck It (23 Productions)
- From The Road Vol. 3 - Dead Lecturing (23 Productions)

=== Albums ===
- Buck Dharma CD/2×LP (5RC / Time-Lag)
- L'un Marquer Contre La Moissonneuse CD (Three Lobed Recordings)
- Sunset Sleeves LP (Weird Forest)
- Xiao LP (DeStijl)
- Xiao CD/LP (Troubleman Unlimited)
- Gipsy Freedom CD/LP (5RC)
- My week beats your year The Great Pop Supplement LP
- The Flood CD/LP (Troubleman)
- James & The Quiet CD/LP (Ecstatic Peace!/Universal)
- Waiting in Vain CD (Rykodisc)
- Born Bad LP (People in a Position to Know)
- Hard Knox CD (Ecstatic Peace!)
- Death Seat CD/LP (Young God Records)
- Briarwood CD/LP (Fire Records)
- Blood Oaths of the New Blues CD/LP (Fire Records)
- Farmer's Corner CD/LP (Fire Records)
- Clipper Ship (May 2017)
- Some Archives 1995-2010 (February 2020)

=== Compilation albums ===
- Satya Sai Baba Plays The Ring of Spells on the Heart Liver & Lungs compilation (???)
- Liberty on Animal Power Magic compilation (Nature Tape Limb)

=== Other and related releases ===
- A Cut Above featuring Wooden Wand & Satya Sai Baba Cemetery of Life CS (Polyamory)
- The Diehls Noise at the Diehls CD-R (WWVV #2)
- Ego Plummet No Shoes CD-R (virgin eye blood brothers + son of earth + wwvv) (Polyamory)
- Heidi Diehl Old Times / Year of the Stone VHS (Polyamory / WWVV #5)
- Heircraft Totem September 1–4, 2004 CS (Polyamory)
- Night Moves book (WWVV#6)
- The Jones Gang High Eye: Live in Nashville CDR (Polyamory)
- The Vanishing Voice Nordic Visions LP (Gipsy Phinx)
- The Vanishing Voice Jarvis Hall CDR (VV)
- The Vanishing Voice Road Of Trials CDR (VV)
- The Vanishing Voice Vellum one sided c50 CS (Meudiademorte)
- Time Life (Crane & Diehl] Doubled Blackberry CS (Meudiademorte)
- Time Life (Crane & Diehl] Gripstone CS (Night People)
- Vanishing (Crane & Diehl) s/t CS (WWVV #3)
- Voice (Crane & Taveniere) s/t CS(WWVV #4)
- Wooden Wand Harem of the Sundrum and the Witness Figg CS (Polyamory)
- Wooden Wand & Satya Sai Baba Moray Elk Themes 7-inch (Gold Soundz)
- Wooden Wand & Satya Sai Baba Crow’s Feet Modifier on Cottage Industrial, Vol.3 comp (Humbug)
- Wooden Wand & The Sky High Band Second Attention CD (Kill Rock Stars)
- Wooden Wand & Tovah D Day Bad News Bearers CS (Polyamory)
- Wooden Wand & The World War IV (Three Lobed Recordings)
- Castanets/I Heart Lung 12-inch (Crane & Tavaniere w/Castanets) (Sounds Are Active)
- The Blood Group Everything Forgotten Gathers At The Ceiling (Le Grand Magistery)
- The Blood Group Volunteers (Le Grand Magistery)
- Wooden Wand / Owen Tromans "Circle / Guru Femmes" split 7-inch (Critical Heights)
- Wooden Wand and the Omen Bones Band Horus of the Horizon 10-inch (Great Pop Supplement, gps24)
