= Aoife Nessa Frances =

- Born: 1992 (age 33–34)
- Origin: Dublin, Ireland
- Genres: folk, pop
- Years active: 2013–present
- Labels: Ba Da Bing Records, Mexican Summer

Aoife Nessa Frances (born 1992) is a singer, songwriter, and musician from Dublin, Ireland.

== Early life ==
Frances grew up in Dublin, where she attended the Newpark Comprehensive School. Her parents are an actress and a fiddle maker.

== Career ==
From 2013 to 2015, she performed as one half of the shoegaze band Princess. The group received media attention, and were named as one of "The next big things in music" by The Irish Times in 2015. Writing for the paper, music journalist Jim Carrol wrote: "A Dublin-based quintet led by Aoife McCarthy and Liam Mesbur, Princess have huge determination and attention to detail..."

In January 2020, she released her debut album Land of No Junction, the title of which is a mondegreen of Llandudno Junction. On review aggregator website Metacritic, the album has a rating of 81, indicating "Universal acclaim". Pitchfork praised the album, writing: "the uncanny allure of Land of No Junction has as much to do with the surprising ways Frances’ lyrics shift from cryptic musings to clear-eyed critique." Exclaim! also praised the album, opining: "Frances's flowing folk-rock arrangements — thick with '60s nostalgia — sound comfortably ungrounded." The Journal of Music called the album: "a collection of songs rooted in the experience of millennial life". Shortly after the album was released Frances was listed as one of Hot Press magazine's "Hot for 2020", with the magazine writing: "The dulcet tones of the north Dublin native float on eclectic instrumentation." In February 2020, she performed a live session for Paul McLoone on Today FM. In June 2020, Paste listed her as one of the "13 Irish Acts You Need to Know in 2020". In September 2020, she was listed as one of "The Best 50 Irish Music Acts Right Now" by The Irish Times who wrote that her music "beguilingly splices minimalism and alternative pop". On the 19th of December 2020, she appeared on the Irish television series Other Voices.

On the 18 March 2021 she performed at SXSW. In July 2021, she collaborated with the LA musician Jack Name on the single Watching the Willows Burn, which was released on the Mexican Summer label. Stereogum wrote of the track: "It’s a deeply pretty song that casts an intimate sort of spell...". In September 2021, she played the Garden Stage at the End of the Road Festival. In November and December 2021, she toured the US and Canada with the Canadian indie rock band The New Pornographers.

== Discography ==
Albums

- Land of No Junction (2020)
- Protector (2022)
