= Raccoo-oo-oon =

US musical group

- Origin: Iowa, United States
- Genres: Experimental; Noise rock Psychedelic rock
- Years active: 2004–2008
- Labels: Night People; Not Not Fun Records; Release The Bats Records
- Past members: Andy Spore; Daren Ho; Ryan Garbes; Shawn Reed
- Website: Band Website

Raccoo-oo-oon was an experimental noise rock/psychedelic rock quartet from Iowa.

Their first release was a self-issued cassette entitled Is Night People, which was reissued by Swedish label Release the Bats, (see Allmusic).

The members of the group were Andy Spore (vocals, electronics, percussion and saxophone), Daren Ho (vocals, guitar and electronics), Ryan Garbes (percussion and electronics) and Shawn Reed (vocals, guitar, electronics and percussion).

In 2012 guitarist Daren Ho opened Control Synthesizers and Electronic Devices in Brooklyn, NY with Jonas Asher.

== Style ==
Their style of music has been described as "tribal-like percussions", "raw and impetuous – characterised by seemingly-improvised saxophone freak-outs and crashing percussion with an emphasis on chaos".

== Discography ==
- 2005 - Is Night People Cassette
- 2005 - Mythos Folkways No. 1 LP
- 2006 - Mythos Folkways Vol. No. 2: Pre-American Lands (Raccoo-oo-oon & Woods Split) LP
- 2006 - Bored Fortress (Raccoo-oo-oon & Sword Heaven Split) LP
- 2006 - The Cave of Spirits Forever
- 2006 - Death at Prospect Peak Cassette
- 2006 - Mythos Folkways Vol. 3: Divination Night Cassette
- 2007 - Behold Secret Kingdom LP
- 2007 - "Raccoo-oo-oon" 7"
- 2008 - Mythos Folkways Vol. IV: Future Vision Cassette
- 2008 - Mythos Folkways Vol. V: Future Vision Cassette
- 2008 - Raccoo-oo-oon 2 LP
