= Black Fiction =

Black Fiction is an indie rock band from San Francisco, CA.

== History ==
The band came about because of a friendship between multi-instrumentalist and songwriter, Tim Cohen and bassist Evan Martin. The two met in 1999 while working together, and would write songs during their lunch breaks. Over the years following their meeting, Cohen and Martin worked on numerous musical projects together, eventually getting an invitation to perform in the Mission Creek Music and Arts Festival. Unfortunately, their project at the time, Feller Quentin, no longer existed when the festival came around. Not wanting to miss out, Cohen and Martin convinced percussionist Jon Bernson to join the band with his friends, synth player Jason Chavez and keyboardist Joe Roberts. The newly formed band was called Black Fiction. Anthony Marin, who plays the drums, glockenspiel and triangle, joined on soon after. The band's first album, Ghost Ride, was released in 2006 on the Howells Transmitter label.

== Sources ==
- Hix, Lisa (August 23, 2006). "Black Fiction". San Francisco Chronicle.
- Strachota, Dan (August 23, 2006). "Outer Bongolia". SF Weekly.
- Tighe, K. (August 22, 2006). "Rock's black back pages: Black Fiction take us for a Ride". San Francisco Bay Guardian.

=== Album reviews ===
- Boston Globe
- Dusted Magazine
- PopMatters
