= Alexandra Zapruder =

American writer (born 1969)

Alexandra Zapruder posing for a photo taken by her daughter, Hannah Zapruder (2026)

Alexandra Zapruder (born 1969) is the author and editor of Salvaged Pages: Young Writers' Diaries of the Holocaust. which won the National Jewish Book Award in the Holocaust category in 2002. The book is a collection of 15 diaries of young writers who lived during the Holocaust.

== Early life and education ==
Zapruder is a 1991 graduate of Smith College and received an Ed.M. in education from Harvard University in 1995.

Her grandfather was Abraham Zapruder, who took a twenty-six second home movie of President John F. Kennedy’s assassination — now known as the Zapruder film.

== Work and career ==
In 2005, Zapruder wrote and co-produced a documentary film based on her book with MTV director Lauren Lazin. "I'm Still Here: Real Diaries of Teenagers Who Lived During The Holocaust," debuted on MTV in 2005 and was nominated for two Emmy awards.

In 2015, Salvaged Pages was reissued in a second paperback edition with updates, corrections, and new information. A multimedia e-book version was also published that same year and includes visual images of the diaries and their writers, interviews, glossary terms, maps, and other valuable information for educators, students, and the general public.

Zapruder is the author of the 2016 book Twenty-Six Seconds: A Personal History of the Zapruder Film.
