= Woods (band) =

American folk rock band

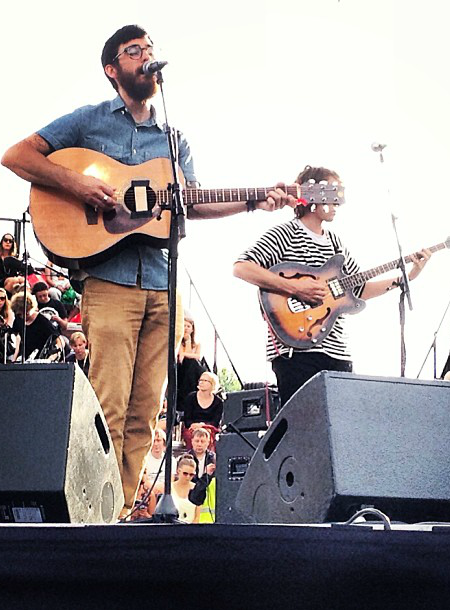
- Woods performing at Flow Festival in Helsinki, Finland in 2013

Background information
- Origin: Brooklyn, New York, United States
- Genres: Folk rock; indie folk psychedelic folk; freak folk; neo-psychedelia; jam band
- Years active: 2005–present
- Labels: Woodsist, Shrimper
- Members: Jeremy Earl; Jarvis Taveniere; Aaron Neveu; Chuck Van Dyck; Kyle Forester
- Past members: John Andrews; Kevin Morby; G. Lucas Crane; Christian DeRoeck
- Website: woodsist.com/woods

Woods is an American folk rock band from Brooklyn, New York, formed in 2005. The band consists of Jeremy Earl (vocals, various instruments), Jarvis Taveniere (guitar, bass, production), Aaron Neveu (drums), Chuck Van Dyck (bass), and Kyle Forester (keyboards, sax). The band's former bassist, Kevin Morby, left the band in 2013.

Woods have released 11 albums, the latest being Perennial. Pitchfork Media reviewed one of their previous albums, Songs of Shame, giving the band its "Best New Music" designation and describing the sound as "a distinctive blend of spooky campfire folk, lo-fi rock, homemade tape collages, and other noisy interludes, all anchored by deceptively sturdy melodies."

Singer-guitarist and founder Jeremy Earl also runs the Brooklyn label Woodsist, for whom the band releases their work.

== Early history ==
Prior to their initial output as Woods, founding members Jeremy Earl and Jarvis Taveniere, along with former member Christian DeRoeck, performed together in the band Meneguar, in which Taveniere sang and played guitar, and Earl played drums. Meneguar released three albums, beginning with I Was Born At Night (released on cassette in 2004 by Fuck It Tapes, on LP the following year by Magic Bullet Records, and reissued in 2006 by Troubleman Unlimited). The group released two subsequent albums, Strangers in Our House (Release the Bats Records, 2007) and The In Hour (Woodsist, 2008) prior to shifting their focus full-time to recording and performing as Woods.

== Line-up ==
Current

- Jeremy Earl – vocals, composer, guitar, twelve-string guitar, producer, acoustic guitar, electric guitar, drums, percussion, engineer, bass guitar (2005–present)
- Jarvis Taveniere – guitar, twelve-string guitar, composer, bass, producer, engineer, mixing (2005–present)
- John Andrews – piano, organ, musical saw
- Chuck Van Dyck – bass guitar (2014–present)
- Kyle Forester – keyboards, saxophone (2016–present)

Former

- Kevin Morby – bass guitar (2009–2013)
- Aaron Neveu – drums, acoustic guitar, bass (2013–2020)
- G. Lucas Crane – tapes, keyboards
- Christian DeRoeck – vocals, guitar

=== Gallery ===
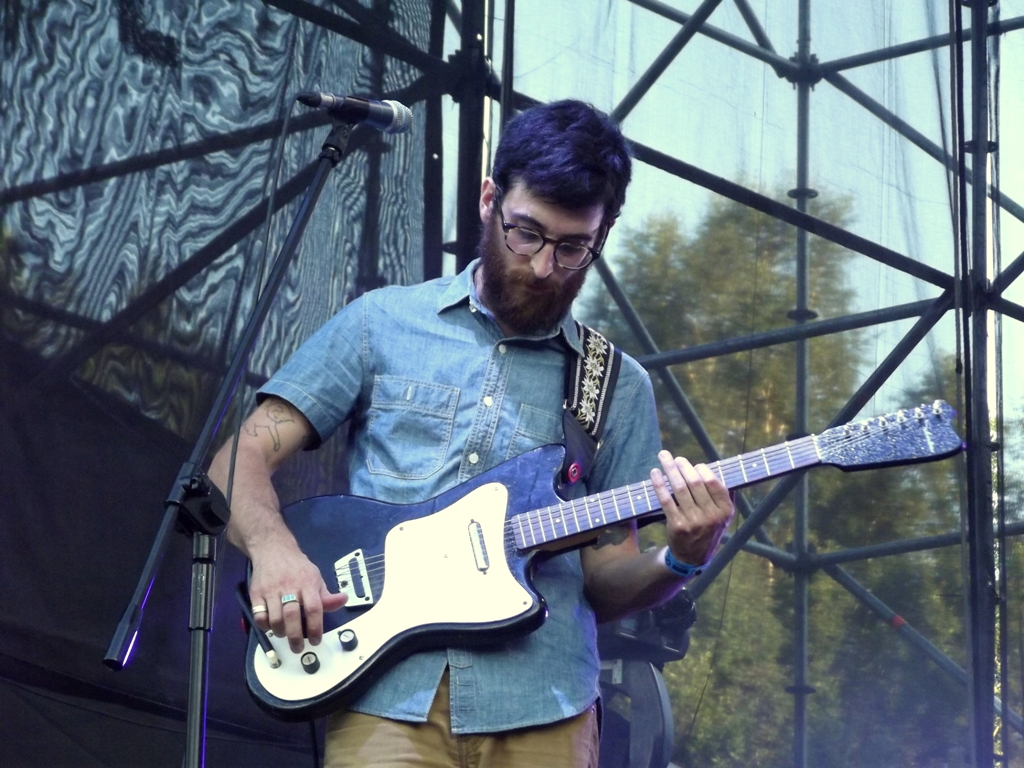
Jeremy Earl on electric guitar

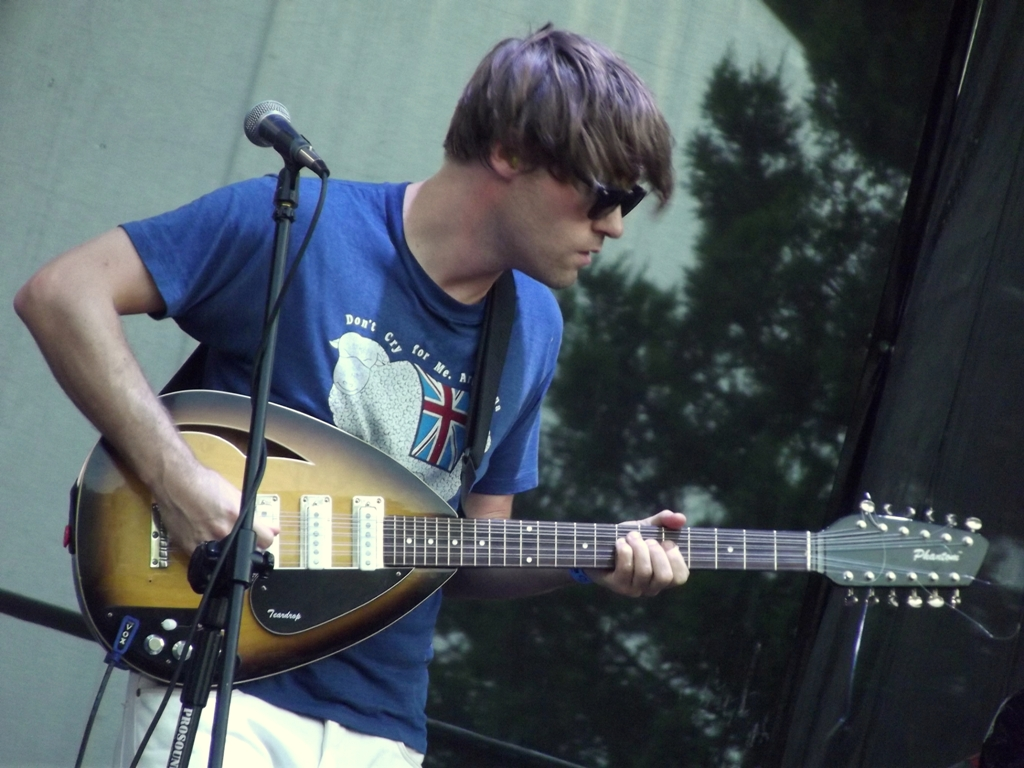
Jarvis Taveniere on twelve-string electric guitar

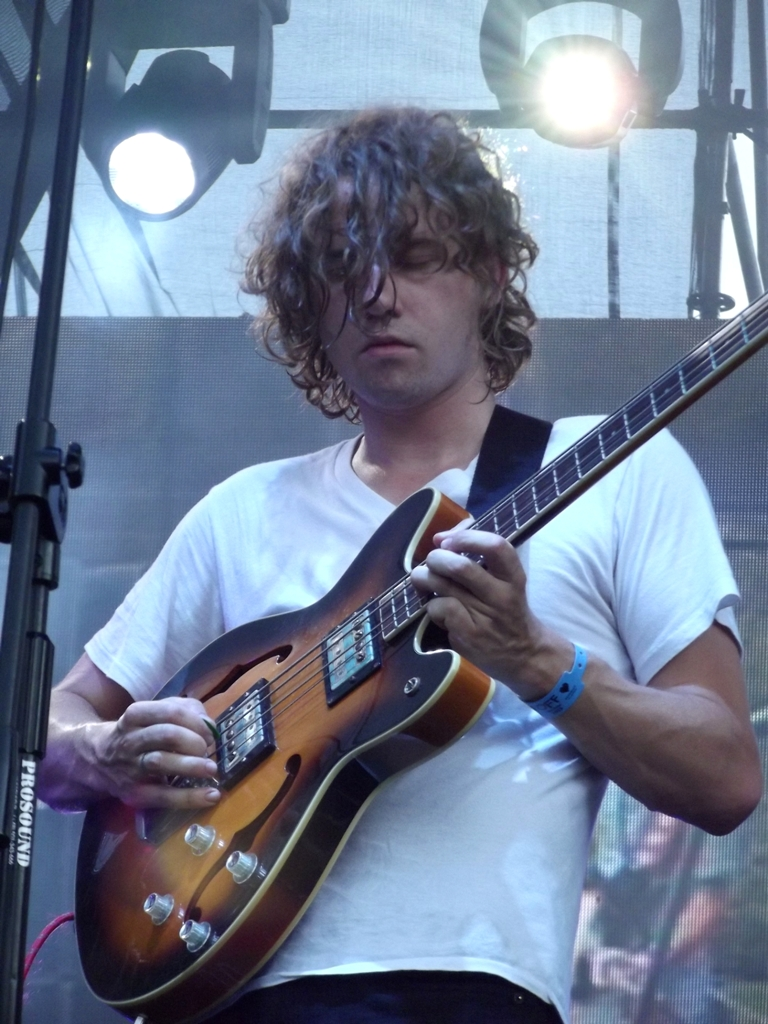
Kevin Morby (formerly) on bass guitar

== Discography ==
Studio albums

- At Rear House (2007)
- How to Survive In + In the Woods (2007)
- Woods Family Creeps (2008)
- Songs of Shame (2009)
- At Echo Lake (2010)
- Sun and Shade (2011)
- Bend Beyond (2012)
- With Light and with Love (2014)
- City Sun Eater in the River of Light (2016)
- Love Is Love (2017)
- Strange to Explain (2020)
- Perennial (2023)

Compilations

- Reflections Vol. 1 (Bumble Bee Crown King) (2020)

Singles & EPs

- "To Clean" b/w "Rain On" (Live On WVKR" (7-inch Half Machine, 2009) U.K. Issue
- "Sunlit" b/w "The Dark" (7-inch Captured Tracks, 2009)
- "I Was Gone" - EP (12-inch Woodsist, 2010)
- "Find Them Empty" b/w "Be There" (7-inch Woodsist, 2011)
- Summer Tour 2011 Tour Split with Kurt Vile (33 rpm 7-inch Woodsist, 2011)
- "Cali in a Cup" b/w "Give Your Light Off" (7-inch Woodsist, 2012)
- "Be All Be Easy" b/w "God's Children" (7-inch Woodsist, 2013)
- "Tambourine Light" b/w "Tomorrow's Only Yesterday" (7-inch Woodsist, 2014)
