= The Fresh & Onlys =

Band

- Origin: San Francisco, California, U.S.
- Genres: Garage rock, psychedelic rock, alternative rock, jangle pop, acid folk, post-punk
- Years active: 2008–present
- Labels: Mexican Summer, Sacred Bones, Captured Tracks, Castle Face Records, In The Red Records, Woodsist
- Members: Tim Cohen; Wymond Miles
- Past members: Heidi Alexander; Grace Cooper; James Kim; Shayde Sartin; Kyle Gibson

The Fresh & Onlys are an American rock band. They were formed in San Francisco, California, United States, in 2008 by Tim Cohen of Black Fiction, bassist Shayde Sartin and guitarist Wymond Miles. A year later they recruited drummer Kyle Gibson. They are a key band in what has been described as San Francisco's "new garage rock" movement, but their sound is equally aligned with pastoral psychedelia, brooding new wave, western twang, and jangly literate 1980s guitar pop.

The band's catalog has found homes on several record labels including Woodsist, Captured Tracks, In The Red, Sacred Bones, and Castle Face. Their more recent work has been released by Mexican Summer including Long Slow Dance, released in September 2012, followed by the Soothsayer EP in late 2013.

In 2017, they announced their seventh studio album Wolf Lie Down which is to be released on August 25, 2017, via Sinderlyn. According to a press release, it was primarily written and recorded by Cohen and Miles, with contributions from former members Sartin and Gibson, alongside James Baron [sic] of Beach House.

== Discography ==
=== Studio albums ===
- The Fresh & Onlys (2008)
- Grey-Eyed Girls (2009)
- Play It Strange (2010)
- Long Slow Dance (2012)
- House of Spirits (2014)
- Early Years Anthology (2015)
- Wolf Lie Down (2017)

=== Extended plays ===
- August in My Mind (2010)
- Secret Walls (2011)
- Soothsayer (2013)
