= Woodsist =

American independent record label

- Founded: 2006
- Founder: Jeremy Earl
- Genre: Various
- Country of origin: U.S.
- Location: Stone Ridge, New York
- Official website: www.woodsist.com

Woodsist is an American independent record label founded in 2006 by Jeremy Earl of the band Woods and based in Stone Ridge, New York.

== Artists ==
- Alex Bleeker and the Freaks
- Art Museums
- The Babies
- Blank Dogs
- Blues Control
- The Christian Family Underground
- Cian Nugent
- Crystal Stilts
- The Doozer
- Ducktails
- Eat Skull
- Excepter
- Fergus & Geronimo
- The Folk Spectre
- The Fresh & Onlys
- Ganglians
- Golden Calves
- Hand Habits
- Herbcraft
- Idle Times
- Jana Hunter
- John Andrews & the Yawns
- Jonathan Rado
- Kevin Morby
- Kurt Vile
- Little Wings
- Loosers
- Mac Demarco
- Magic Lantern
- Matt Kivel
- Matt "MV" Valentine
- The Mayfair Set
- Meneguar
- Meth Teeth
- Moon Duo
- MV & EE
- Night Wounds
- Nodzzz
- Pink Reason
- Pocahaunted
- Psychedelic Horseshit
- Purling Hiss
- Raccoo-oo-oon
- Real Estate
- Robedoor
- Royal Baths
- Sic Alps
- Simon Joyner
- The Skygreen Leopards
- Spectre Folk
- Sun Araw
- Thee Oh Sees
- Vivian Girls
- Wavves
- White Fence
- Wooden Wand
- Woods
- The Woolen Men

== Discography ==
- Woodsist 001 Raccoo-oo-oon – Mythos Folkways No. 1 (LP) 2006
- Woodsist 002 Night Wounds – Allergic to Heat (LP) 2006
- Woodsist 003 Blues Control – Puff (LP) 2007
- Woodsist 004 Woods – At Rear House (LP) 2007
- Woodsist 005 Wooden Wand – More from the Mountain (7") 2007
- Woodsist 006 Raccoo-oo-oon – Mythos Folkways Vol. III (LP) 2007
- Woodsist 007 Jana Hunter – Carrion (S/Sided 12") 2007
- Woodsist 008 The Christian Family Underground – For the Depth of Your Union... (LP) 2007
- Woodsist 009 The Folk Spectre – The Blackest Medicine (LP) 2007
- Woodsist 010 Loosers – Logic on Its Head (10") 2007
- Woodsist 011 Sic Alps – Strawberry Guillotine (7") 2007
- Woodsist 012 Pocahaunted – Peyote Road (LP) 2008
- Woodsist 013 Meneguar – The In Hour (CD/LP)
- Woodsist 014 Pink Reason – Winona (7") 2008
- Woodsist 015 Robedoor – Endlessly Blazing (LP) 2008
- Woodsist 016 Vivian Girls – Tell the World (7") 2008
- Woodsist 017 Crystal Stilts – Crystal Stilts (CD/12") 2008
- woodsist 018 Sun Araw – Boat Trip (12") 2008
- Woodsist 019 Magic Lantern – Magic Lantern (12") 2008
- Woodsist 020 Idle Times – Idle Times (7") 2008
- Woodsist 021 Blank Dogs – The Fields (CD/LP) 2008
- Woodsist 022 Wavves – Wavves (CD/LP) 2008
- Woodsist 023 Psychedelic Horseshit – Shitgaze Anthems (LP) 2009
- Woodsist 024 Kurt Vile – Constant Hitmaker (CD/LP) 2009
- Woodsist 025 Woods – Songs of Shame (CD/LP) 2009
- Woodsist 026 Thee Oh Sees – Tidal Wave (7") 2009
- Woodsist 027 Fergus & Geronimo – Harder than It's Ever Been/Last Letter (7") 2009
- Woodsist 028 Ganglians – Ganglians (12") 2009
- Woodsist 029 Real Estate – Fake Blues (7") 2009
- Woodsist 030 Meth Teeth – Everything Went Wrong (LP) 2009
- Woodsist 031 Ganglians – Monster Head Room (CD) 2009
- Woodsist 032 The Fresh & Onlys – Grey-Eyed Girls (CD/LP) 2009
- Woodsist 033 The Mayfair Set – Young One (CD) 2009
- Woodsist 034 Real Estate – Real Estate (CD/LP) 2009
- Woodsist 035 The Fresh & Onlys – "The Second One to Know" 7"
- Woodsist 036 Eat Skull – "Jerusalem Mall" 7"
- Woodsist 037 Art Museums – "Rough Frame" (CD/LP)
- Woodsist 038 Moon Duo – "Escape" Mini-LP/CD
- Woodsist 039 MV & EE – "Home Comfort" LP
- Woodsist 040 Woods – "At Echo Lake" (CD/LP/CS)
- Woodsist 041 Woods – "I Was Gone" 7"
- Woodsist 042 White Fence – S/T (CD)
- Woodsist 043 V/A – Welcome Home/Diggin' the Universe (LP/CS)
- Woodsist 044 Royal Baths – CD/LP
- Woodsist 045 Sun Araw – Off Duty 12"/ CD (includes Boat Trip EP)
- Woodsist 046 Excepter – "Late" 12"
- Woodsist 047 Purling Hiss – Public Service Announcement LP
- Woodsist 048 Ducktails – III: Arcade Dynamics CD/LP
- Woodsist 049 White Fence – Is Growing Faith CD/LP
- Woodsist 050 Spectre Folk – The Blackest Medicine, Vol. II- 12"
- Woodsist 051 Nodzzz - "Innings" – (CD/LP) 2011
- Woodsist 052 Matt "MV" Valentine – "What I Became" (LP) 2011
- Woodsist 053 Woods – "Sun and Shade" (CD/LP) 2011
- Woodsist 054 Woods / Kurt Vile – Split (7") 2011
- Woodsist 055 The Doozer – Keep It Together (LP) 2012
- Woodsist 056 Golden Calves – Collection: Money Band + Century Band (2xLP) 2012
- Woodsist 057 White Fence – Family Perfume vol. 1 (LP) 2012
- Woodsist 058 White Fence – Family Perfume vol. 2 (LP) 2012
- Woodsist 059 White Fence – Family Perfume vol. 1&2 (CD/CS/2xLP) 2012
- Woodsist 060 MV & EE – Space Homestead (CD/LP) 2012
- Woodsist 061 Woods – "Cali in a Cup" (7") 2012
- Woodsist 062 Woods – "Bend Beyond" (CD/LP/CS) 2012
- Woodsist 063 The Babies – "Moonlight Mile" (7") 2012
- Woodsist 064 The Babies – "Our House on the Hill" (CD/LP/CS) 2012
- Woodsist 065 Eat Skull – "III" (LP) 2013
- Woodsist 066 Herbcraft – "The Astral Body Electric" (LP) 2013
- Woodsist 067 The Woolen Men – "S/T" (LP) 2013
- Woodsist 068 Alex Bleeker and the Freaks – "How Far Away" (CD/LP) 2013
- Woodsist 069 Woods – "Be All Be Easy" (7") 2013
- Woodsist 070 Jonathan Rado – "Law and Order" (CD/LP) 2013
- Woodsist 071 Kevin Morby – "Harlem River" (CD/LP) 2013
- Woodsist 072 Woods – "With Light and with Love" (CD/LP/CS) 2014
- Woodsist 073 Skygreen Leopards – "Family Crimes" (CD/LP) 2014
- Woodsist 074 Matt Kivel – "Days of Being Wild" (CD/LP) 2014
- Woodsist 075 Kevin Morby – "Still Life" (CD/LP) 2014
- Woodsist 076 Simon Joyner – "Grass, Branch & Bone" (LP) 2015
- Woodsist 077 Little Wings – "Explains" (CD/LP) 2015
- Woodsist 078 John Andrews & the Yawns – "Bit by the Fang" (LP) 2015
- Woodsist 079 The Babies – "Our House on the Hill Outtakes" 2015
- Woodsist 080 Herbcraft – "Wot Oz" (LP) 2015
- Woodsist 081 Little Wings – "Live in Big Sur" (CS) 2015
- Woodsist 082 The Woolen Men – "Temporary Monument" (LP) 2015
- Woodsist 083 Cian Nugent – "Night Fiction" (LP) 2016

== See also ==
- List of record labels
