= List of Texas Rangers first-round draft picks =

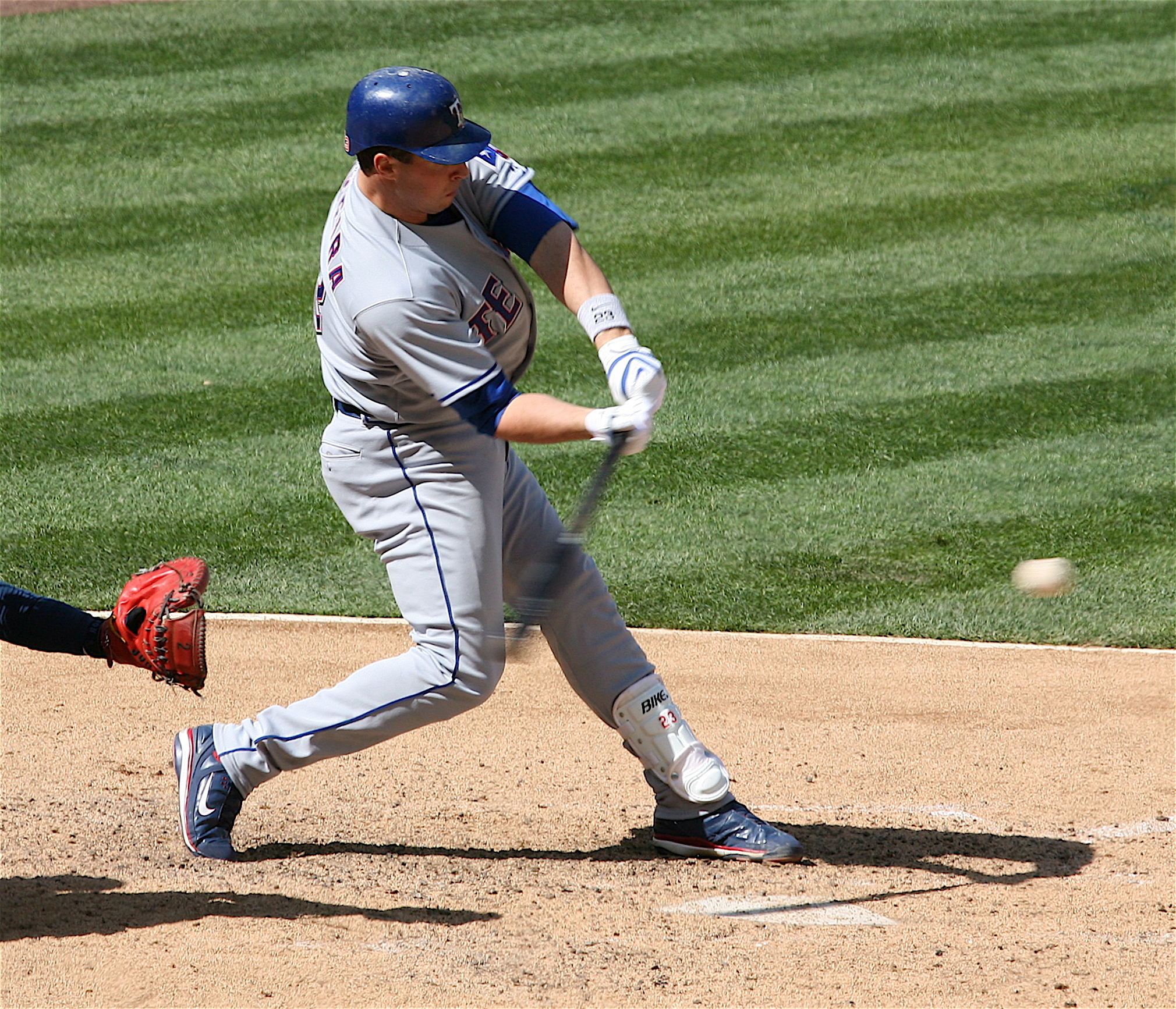
Mark Teixeira (2001) played 162 games for the Rangers in back-to-back seasons and finished second in the MVP voting in 2009.

The Texas Rangers are a Major League Baseball (MLB) franchise based in the Dallas–Fort Worth metropolitan area. They play in the American League West division. Before 1972 (and for the first seven years of the draft), they were known as the Washington Senators and based in Washington, D.C. Since the institution of MLB's Rule 4 Draft, the Rangers franchise has selected 68 players in the first round. Officially known as the "First-Year Player Draft", the Rule 4 Draft is MLB's primary mechanism for assigning amateur baseball players from high schools, colleges, and other amateur baseball clubs to its teams. The draft order is determined based on the previous season's standings, with the team possessing the worst record receiving the first pick. In addition, teams which lost free agents in the previous off-season may be awarded compensatory or supplementary picks.

Of the 71 players picked in the first round by Washington or Texas, 37 have been pitchers, the most of any position; 27 of these were right-handed, while 10 were left-handed. Twelve outfielders, nine third basemen, six shortstops, four catchers, two first basemen, and one second baseman were also taken. Fourteen of the players came from high schools or colleges in the state of Texas, and California follows with ten players. The Rangers have drafted one player, Tanner Scheppers in 2009, who was playing in the American Association of Independent Professional Baseball at the time of the draft. Scheppers was originally drafted by the Baltimore Orioles in the 29th round of the 2005 MLB draft, and by the Pittsburgh Pirates in the second round of the 2008 MLB draft.

With the Exception of Josh Jung, none of the Rangers' first-round picks have won a World Series championship with the team. Also, no pick has been elected to the Hall of Fame. None of these picks have won the MLB Rookie of the Year award, although Oddibe McDowell (1984) placed fourth in the voting in 1985, and Josh Jung placed fourth in the voting in 2023. The Rangers had the first overall selection twice in the draft, which they used on Jeff Burroughs (1969) and David Clyde (1973). Clyde made his debut for the Rangers 20 days after he pitched his high school team to the state finals in the franchise's first sellout at Arlington Stadium.

The Rangers have made 19 selections in the supplemental round of the draft and 26 compensatory picks since the institution of the First-Year Player Draft in 1965. These additional picks are provided when a team loses a particularly valuable free agent in the previous off-season, (Note: Through the 2012 draft, free agents were evaluated by the Elias Sports Bureau and rated "Type A", "Type B", or not compensation-eligible. If a team offered arbitration to a player but that player refused and subsequently signed with another team, the original team was able to receive additional draft picks. If a "Type A" free agent left in this way, his previous team received a supplemental pick and a compensatory pick from the team with which he signed. If a "Type B" free agent left in this way, his previous team received only a supplemental pick. Since the 2013 draft, free agents are no longer classified by type; instead, compensatory picks are only awarded if the team offered its free agent a contract worth at least the average of the 125 current richest MLB contracts. However, if the free agent's last team acquired the player in a trade during the last year of his contract, it is ineligible to receive compensatory picks for that player.) or, more recently, if a team fails to sign a draft pick from the previous year. The Rangers have failed to sign one of their first-round picks, Matt Purke (2009), and received the 15th pick in 2010 as compensation.

== Key ==
Year	Each year links to an article about that year's Major League Baseball draft.
Position	Indicates the secondary/collegiate position at which the player was drafted, rather than the professional position the player may have gone on to play
Pick	Indicates the number of the pick
*	Player did not sign with the Rangers
§	Indicates a supplemental pick

== Picks ==
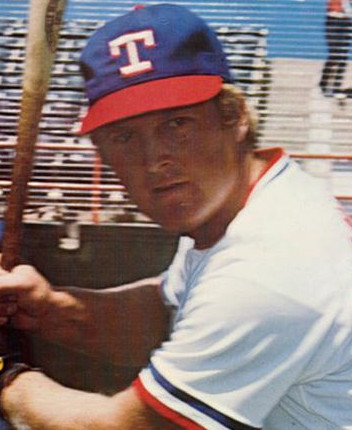
Jeff Burroughs was the number one overall draft pick in 1969.

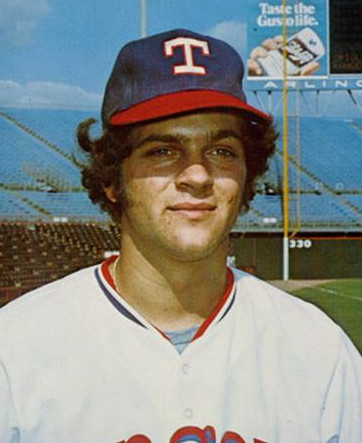
David Clyde was the number one overall draft pick in 1973.

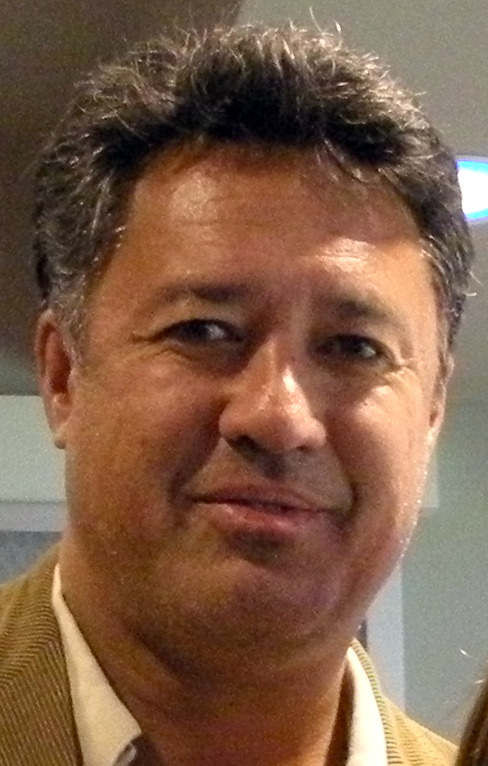
Ron Darling (1980) is the only player drafted by the Rangers in the first round from an Ivy League school.

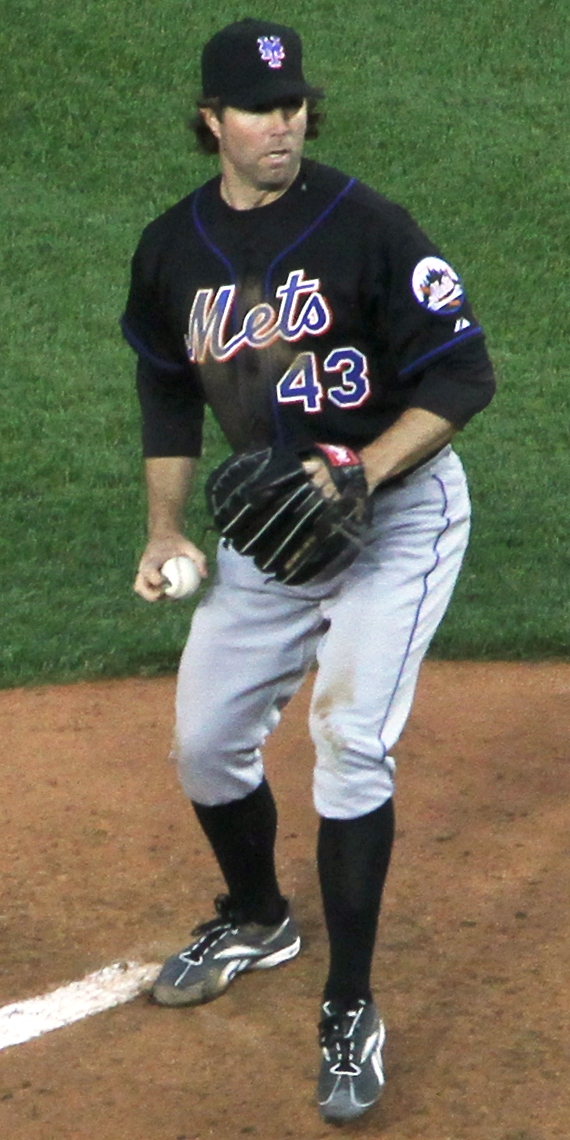
R. A. Dickey (1996) is one of two players drafted by the Rangers from the University of Tennessee.

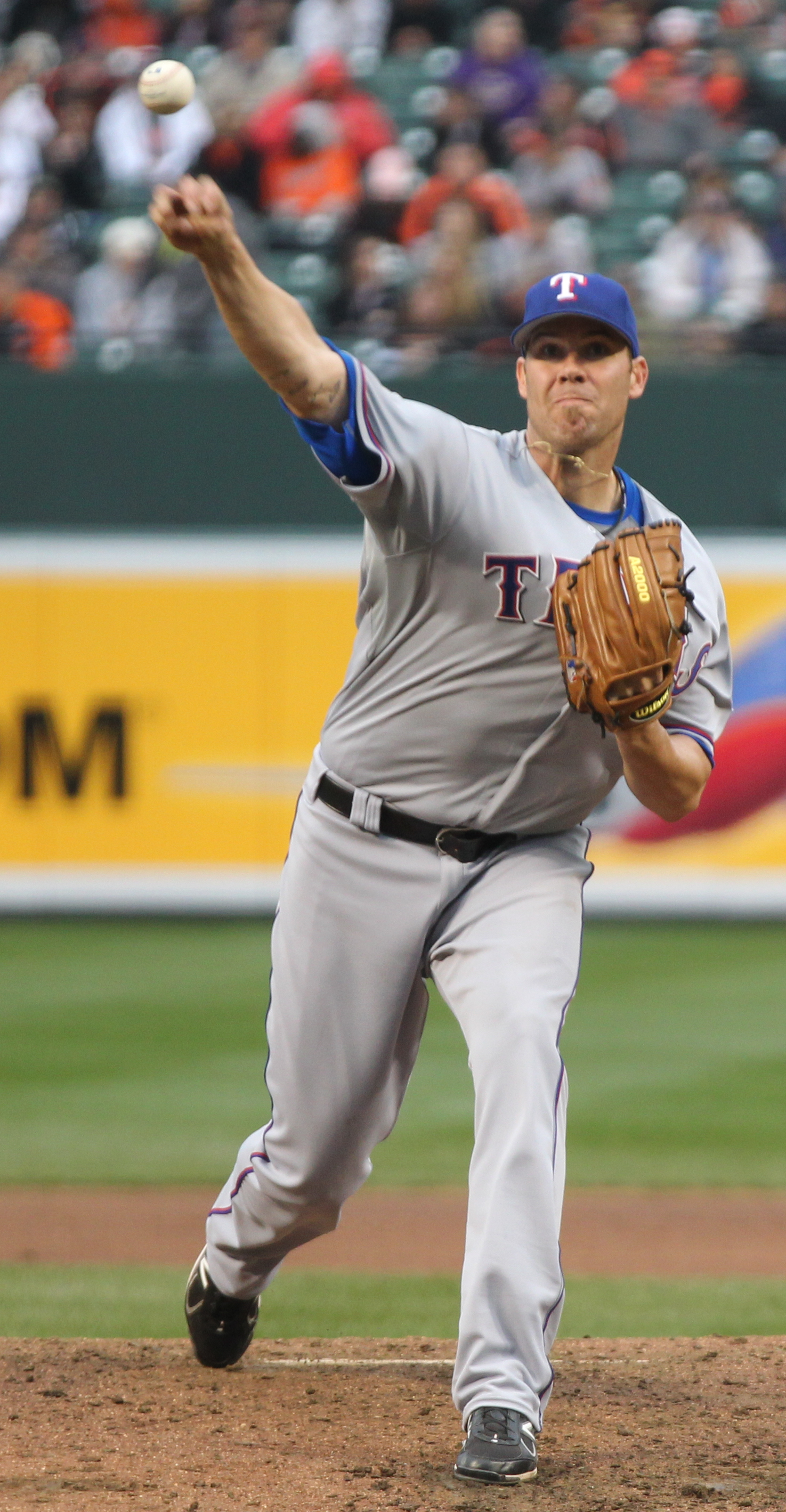
Colby Lewis (1999) is the only player drafted from a junior college by the Rangers in the first round.

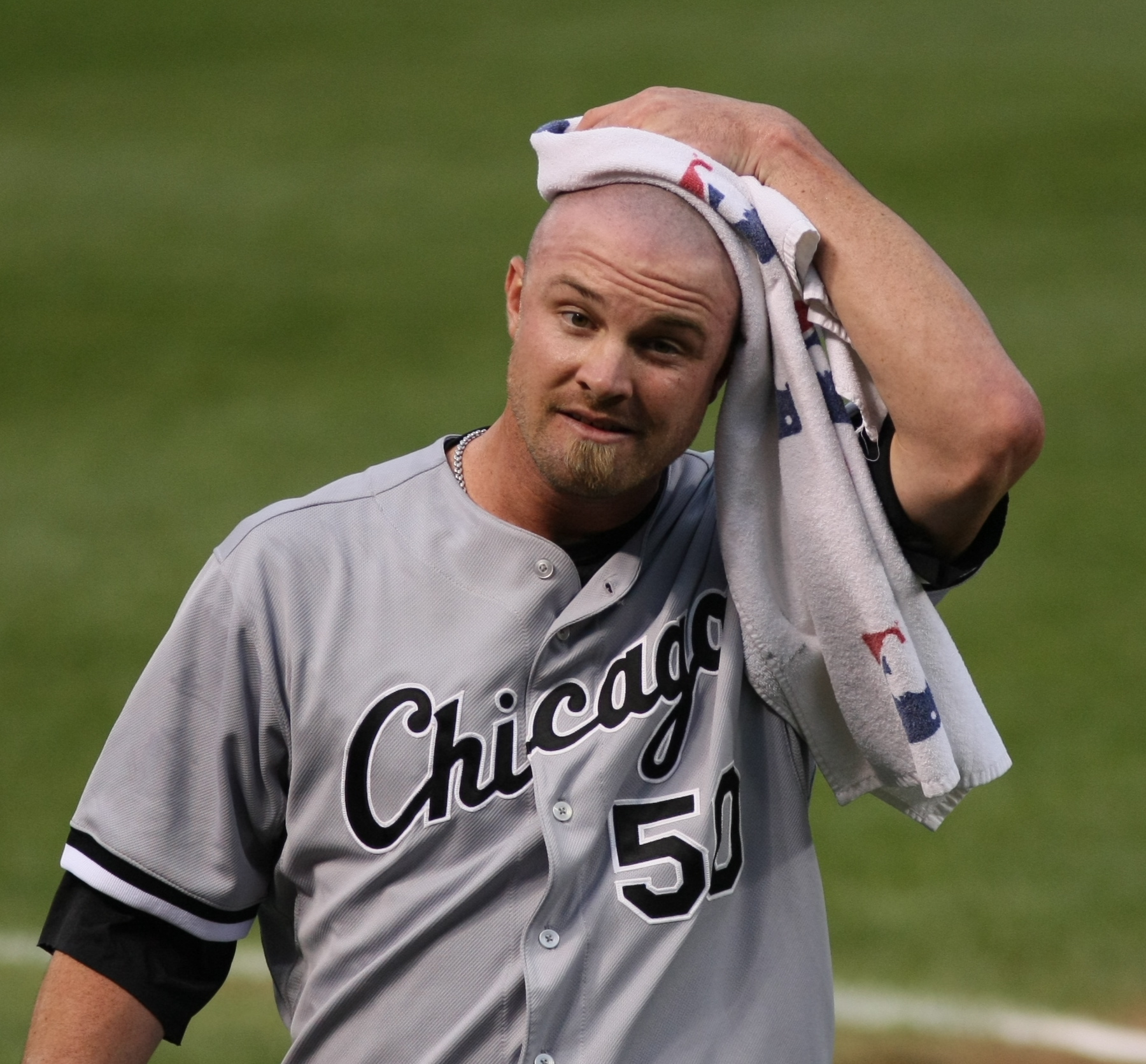
John Danks (2003) is one of seven high school players from Texas selected in the first round by the Rangers.

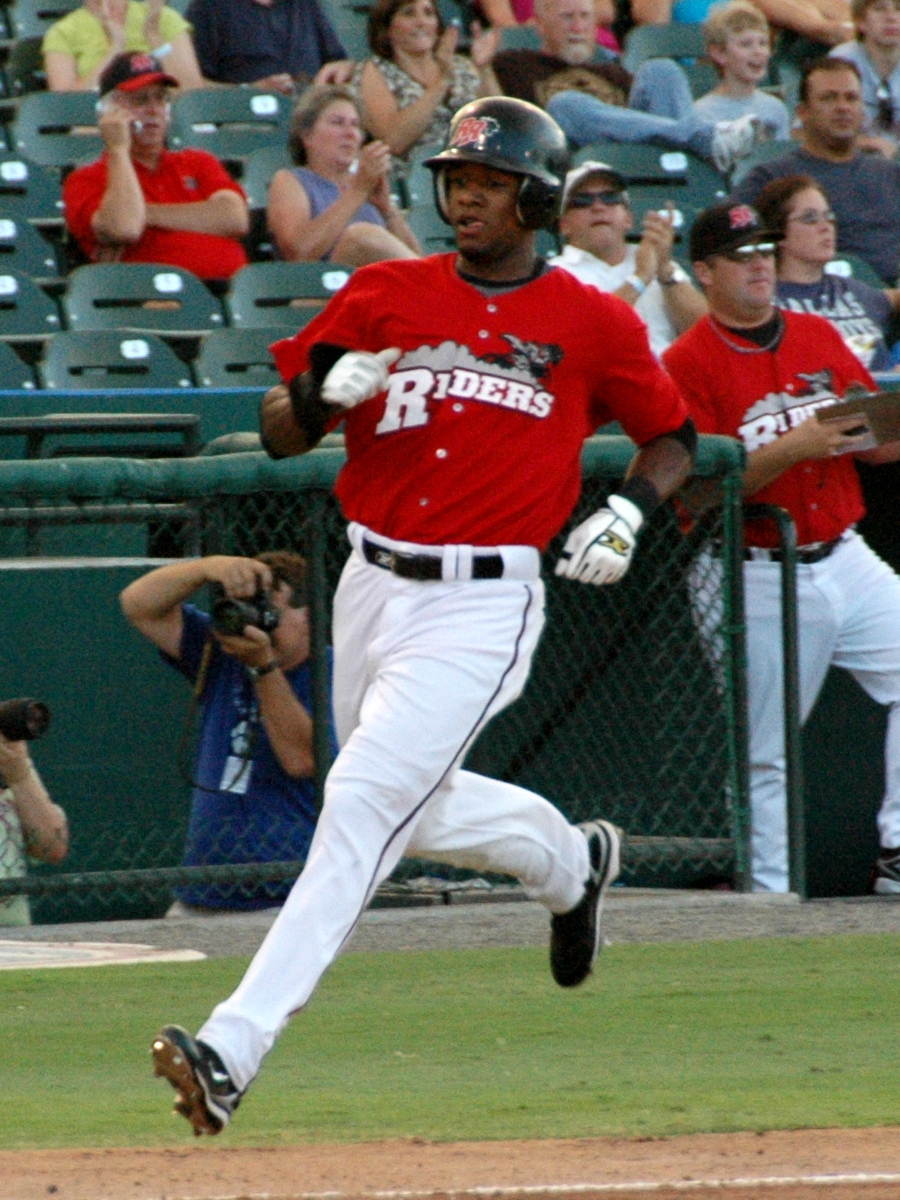
Julio Borbón (2007) is one of five players drafted by the Rangers in the first round of the 2007 draft.

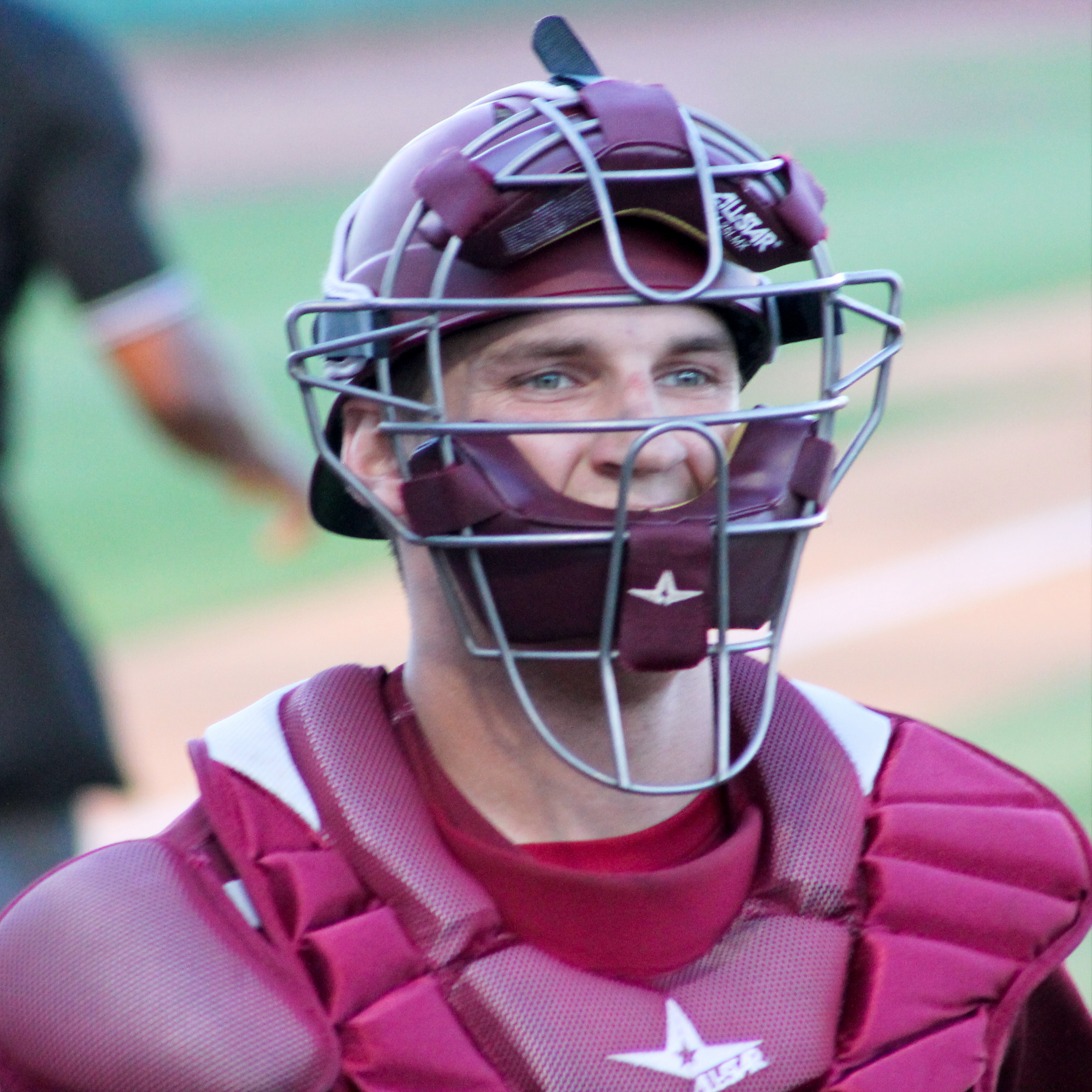
Kellin Deglan (2010) is the only first-round pick drafted by the Rangers from a school outside the United States.

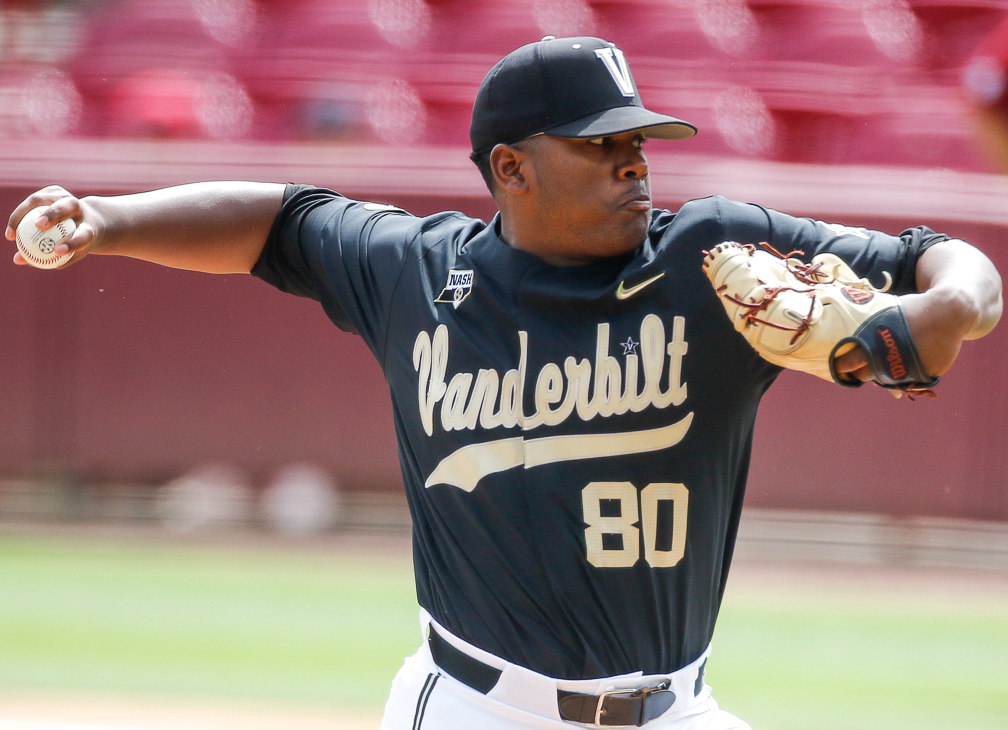
Kumar Rocker (2022) was the second of two Vanderbilt Commodores pitchers selected by the Rangers in the first round in consecutive years.

Year	Name	Position	School (location)	Pick	Ref.
1965	Joe Coleman	Right-handed pitcher	Natick High School (Natick, Massachusetts)	3	
1966	Tom Grieve	Outfielder	Pittsfield High School (Pittsfield, Massachusetts)	6	
1967	John Jones	Catcher	Loretto High School (St. Joseph, Tennessee)	5	
1968	Don Castle	Left-handed pitcher	Coldwater High School (Coldwater, Mississippi)	8	
1969	Jeff Burroughs	Outfielder	Wilson Classical High School (Long Beach, California)	1	
1970	Charles Maxwell	Third baseman	Zane Trace High School (Chillicothe, Ohio)	14	
1971	Roger Quiroga	Right-handed pitcher	Ball High School (Galveston, Texas)	4	
1972	Roy Howell	Third baseman	Lompoc High School (Lompoc, California)	7	
1973	David Clyde	Left-handed pitcher	Westchester High School (Houston, Texas)	1	
1974	Tommy Boggs	Right-handed pitcher	Lanier High School (Austin, Texas)	2	
1975	Jim Gideon	Right-handed pitcher	University of Texas at Austin (Austin, Texas)	17	
1976	Billy Simpson	Outfielder	Lakewood High School (Lakewood, California)	12	
1977	David Hibner	Shortstop	Howell High School (Howell, Michigan)	9	
1978	No first-round pick (Note: The Rangers lost their first-round pick in 1978 to the Oakland Athletics as compensation for signing free agent Mike Jorgensen.)				
1979	Jerry Don Gleaton	Left-handed pitcher	University of Texas at Austin (Austin, Texas)	17	
1980	Tim Maki	Right-handed pitcher	Carroll High School (Huntertown, Indiana)	14	
1981	Ron Darling	Right-handed pitcher	Yale University (New Haven, Connecticut)	9	
1981	Al Lachowicz	Right-handed pitcher	University of Pittsburgh (Pittsburgh, Pennsylvania)	24 (Note: The Rangers gained a compensatory first-round pick in 1981 from the Houston Astros for losing free agent Dave Roberts.)	
1982	No first-round pick (Note: The Rangers lost their first-round pick in 1982 to the Boston Red Sox as compensation for signing free agent Frank Tanana.)				
1983	Jeff Kunkel	Shortstop	Rider University (Lawrenceville, New Jersey)	3	
1984	Oddibe McDowell	Outfielder	Arizona State University (Tempe, Arizona)	12	
1985	Bobby Witt	Right-handed pitcher	University of Oklahoma (Norman, Oklahoma)	3	
1986	Kevin Brown	Right-handed pitcher	Georgia Institute of Technology (Atlanta, Georgia)	4	
1987	Brian Bohanon	Left-handed pitcher	North Shore High School (Houston, Texas)	19	
1987	Bill Haselman	Catcher	University of California, Los Angeles (Los Angeles, California)	23 (Note: The Rangers gained a compensatory first-round pick in 1987 from the New York Yankees for losing free agent Gary Ward.)	
1987	Mark Petkovsek	Right-handed pitcher	University of Texas at Austin (Austin, Texas)	29§ (Note: The Rangers gained a supplemental first-round pick in 1987 for losing free agent Gary Ward.)	
1988	Monty Fariss	Shortstop	Oklahoma State University–Stillwater (Stillwater, Oklahoma)	6	
1989	Donald Harris	Outfielder	Texas Tech University (Lubbock, Texas)	5	
1990	Dan Smith	Left-handed pitcher	Creighton University (Omaha, Nebraska)	16	
1991	Benji Gil	Shortstop	Castle Park High School (Chula Vista, California)	19	
1992	Rick Helling	Right-handed pitcher	Stanford University (Stanford, California)	22	
1993	Mike Bell	Third baseman	Moeller High School (Cincinnati, Ohio)	30§ (Note: The Rangers gained a supplemental first-round pick in 1993 for losing free agent José Guzmán.)	
1994	No first-round pick (Note: The Rangers lost their first-round pick in 1994 to the San Francisco Giants as compensation for signing free agent Will Clark.)				
1995	Jonathan Johnson	Right-handed pitcher	Florida State University (Tallahassee, Florida)	7	
1996	R. A. Dickey	Right-handed pitcher	University of Tennessee (Knoxville, Tennessee)	18	
1996	Sam Marsonek	Right-handed pitcher	Jesuit High School (Tampa, Florida)	24 (Note: The Rangers gained a compensatory first-round pick in 1996 from the New York Yankees for losing free agent Kenny Rogers.)	
1996	Corey Lee	Left-handed pitcher	North Carolina State University (Raleigh, North Carolina)	32§ (Note: The Rangers gained a supplemental first-round pick in 1996 for losing free agent Kenny Rogers.)	
1997	Jason Romano	Third baseman	Hillsborough High School (Tampa, Florida)	39§ (Note: The Rangers gained a supplemental first-round pick in 1997 for losing free agent Mike Stanton.)	
1998	Carlos Peña	First baseman	Northeastern University (Boston, Massachusetts)	10	
1999	Colby Lewis	Right-handed pitcher	Bakersfield College (Bakersfield, California)	38§ (Note: The Rangers gained a supplemental first-round pick in 1999 for losing free agent Todd Stottlemyre.)	
1999	Mike Head	Right-handed pitcher	Soddy Daisy High School (Soddy-Daisy, Tennessee)	47§ (Note: The Rangers gained a supplemental first-round pick in 1999 for losing free agent Will Clark.)	
2000	Scott Heard	Catcher	Rancho Bernardo High School (San Diego, California)	25 (Note: The Rangers gained a compensatory first-round pick in 2000 from the New York Mets for losing free agent Todd Zeile.)	
2000	Tyrell Godwin	Outfielder	University of North Carolina at Chapel Hill (Chapel Hill, North Carolina)	35§ (Note: The Rangers gained a supplemental first-round pick in 2000 for losing free agent Aaron Sele.)	
2000	Chad Hawkins	Right-handed pitcher	Baylor University (Waco, Texas)	39§ (Note: The Rangers gained a supplemental first-round pick in 2000 for losing free agent Todd Zeile.)	
2001	Mark Teixeira	Third baseman	Georgia Institute of Technology (Atlanta, Georgia)	5	
2002	Drew Meyer	Shortstop	University of South Carolina (Columbia, South Carolina)	10	
2003	John Danks	Left-handed pitcher	Round Rock High School (Round Rock, Texas)	9	
2004	Thomas Diamond	Right-handed pitcher	University of New Orleans (New Orleans, Louisiana)	10	
2004	Eric Hurley	Right-handed pitcher	Samuel W. Wolfson High School (Jacksonville, Florida)	30 (Note: The Rangers gained a compensatory first-round pick in 2004 from the Atlanta Braves for losing free agent John Thomson.)	
2005	John Mayberry Jr.	Outfielder	Stanford University (Stanford, California)	19	
2006	Kasey Kiker	Left-handed pitcher	Russell County High School (Seale, Alabama)	12	
2007	Blake Beavan	Right-handed pitcher	Irving High School (Irving, Texas)	17 (Note: The Rangers gained a compensatory first-round pick in 2007 from the Houston Astros for losing free agent Carlos Lee.)	
2007	Michael Main	Right-handed pitcher	DeLand High School (DeLand, Florida)	24 (Note: The Rangers gained a compensatory first-round pick in 2007 from the Los Angeles Angels of Anaheim for losing free agent Gary Matthews, Jr.)	
2007	Julio Borbón	Outfielder	University of Tennessee (Knoxville, Tennessee)	35§ (Note: The Rangers gained a supplemental first-round pick in 2007 for losing free agent Carlos Lee.)	
2007	Neil Ramírez	Right-handed pitcher	Kempsville High School (Virginia Beach, Virginia)	44§ (Note: The Rangers gained a supplemental first-round pick in 2007 for losing free agent Gary Matthews, Jr.)	
2007	Tommy Hunter	Right-handed pitcher	University of Alabama (Tuscaloosa, Alabama)	54§ (Note: The Rangers gained a supplemental first-round pick in 2007 for losing free agent Mark DeRosa.)	
2008	Justin Smoak	First baseman	University of South Carolina (Columbia, South Carolina)	11	
2009	Matt Purke*	Left-handed pitcher	Klein High School (Klein, Texas)	14	
2009	Tanner Scheppers	Right-handed pitcher	St. Paul Saints (Independent baseball)	44§ (Note: The Rangers gained a supplemental first-round pick in 2009 for losing free agent Milton Bradley.)	
2010	Jake Skole	Outfielder	Blessed Trinity Catholic High School (Roswell, Georgia)	15 (Note: The Rangers gained a compensatory first-round pick in 2010 for failing to sign draft pick Matt Purke.)	
2010	Kellin Deglan	Catcher	R. E. Mountain Secondary School (Langley, British Columbia)	22	
2010	Luke Jackson	Right-handed pitcher	Calvary Christian High School (Clearwater, Florida)	45§ (Note: The Rangers gained a supplemental first-round pick in 2010 for losing free agent Iván Rodríguez.)	
2010	Mike Olt	Third baseman	University of Connecticut (Storrs, Connecticut)	49§ (Note: The Rangers gained a supplemental first-round pick in 2010 for losing free agent Marlon Byrd.)	
2011	Kevin Matthews	Left-handed pitcher	Richmond Hill High School (Richmond Hill, Georgia)	33 (Note: The Rangers gained a compensatory first-round pick in 2011 from the Philadelphia Phillies for losing free agent Cliff Lee.)	
2011	Zach Cone	Outfielder	University of Georgia (Athens, Georgia)	37§ (Note: The Rangers gained a supplemental first-round pick in 2011 for losing free agent Cliff Lee.)	
2012	Lewis Brinson	Outfielder	Coral Springs High School (Coral Springs, Florida)	29	
2012	Joey Gallo	Third baseman	Bishop Gorman High School (Las Vegas, Nevada)	39§ (Note: The Rangers gained a supplemental first-round pick in 2012 for losing free agent C. J. Wilson.)	
2012	Collin Wiles	Right-handed pitcher	Blue Valley West High School (Stilwell, Kansas)	53§ (Note: The Rangers gained a supplemental first-round pick in 2012 for losing free agent Octavio Dotel.)	
2013	Alex Gonzalez	Right-handed pitcher	Oral Roberts University (Tulsa, Oklahoma)	23	
2013	Travis Demeritte	Third baseman	Winder-Barrow High School (Winder, Georgia)	30§ (Note: The Rangers gained a compensatory first-round pick in 2013 for losing free agent Josh Hamilton.)	
2014	Luis Ortiz	Right-handed pitcher	Sanger Union High School (Sanger, California)	30§ (Note: The Rangers gained a compensatory first-round pick in 2014 for losing free agent Nelson Cruz.)	
2015	Dillon Tate	Right-handed pitcher	University of California, Santa Barbara (Santa Barbara, California)	4	
2016	Cole Ragans	Left-handed pitcher	North Florida Christian High School (Tallahassee, Florida)	30§ (Note: The Rangers gained a compensatory first-round pick in 2016 for losing free agent Yovani Gallardo.)	
2017	Bubba Thompson	Outfielder	McGill–Toolen Catholic High School (Mobile, Alabama)	26	
2017	Chris Seise	Shortstop	West Orange High School (Winter Garden, Florida)	29	
2018	Cole Winn	Right-handed pitcher	Lutheran High School of Orange County (Orange, California)	15	
2019	Josh Jung	Third baseman	Texas Tech University (Lubbock, Texas)	8	
2019	Davis Wendzel	Third baseman	Baylor University (Waco, Texas)	41§ (Note: The Rangers gained a Competitive Balance Round A pick in 2019 from the Milwaukee Brewers in a trade for Alex Claudio.)	
2020	Justin Foscue	Second baseman	Mississippi State University (Starkville, Mississippi)	14	
2021	Jack Leiter	Right-handed pitcher	Vanderbilt University (Nashville, Tennessee)	2	
2022	Kumar Rocker	Right-handed pitcher	Vanderbilt University (Nashville, Tennessee)	3	
2023	Wyatt Langford	Outfielder	University of Florida (Gainesville, Florida)	4	
2024	Malcolm Moore	Catcher	Stanford University (Stanford, California)	30	
2025	Gavin Fien	Shortstop	Great Oak High School (Temecula, California)	12	
2026	Gio Rojas	Left-handed pitcher	Marjory Stoneman Douglas High School (Parkland, Florida)	16	

== See also ==
- Texas Rangers minor league players
