= Earth Libraries =

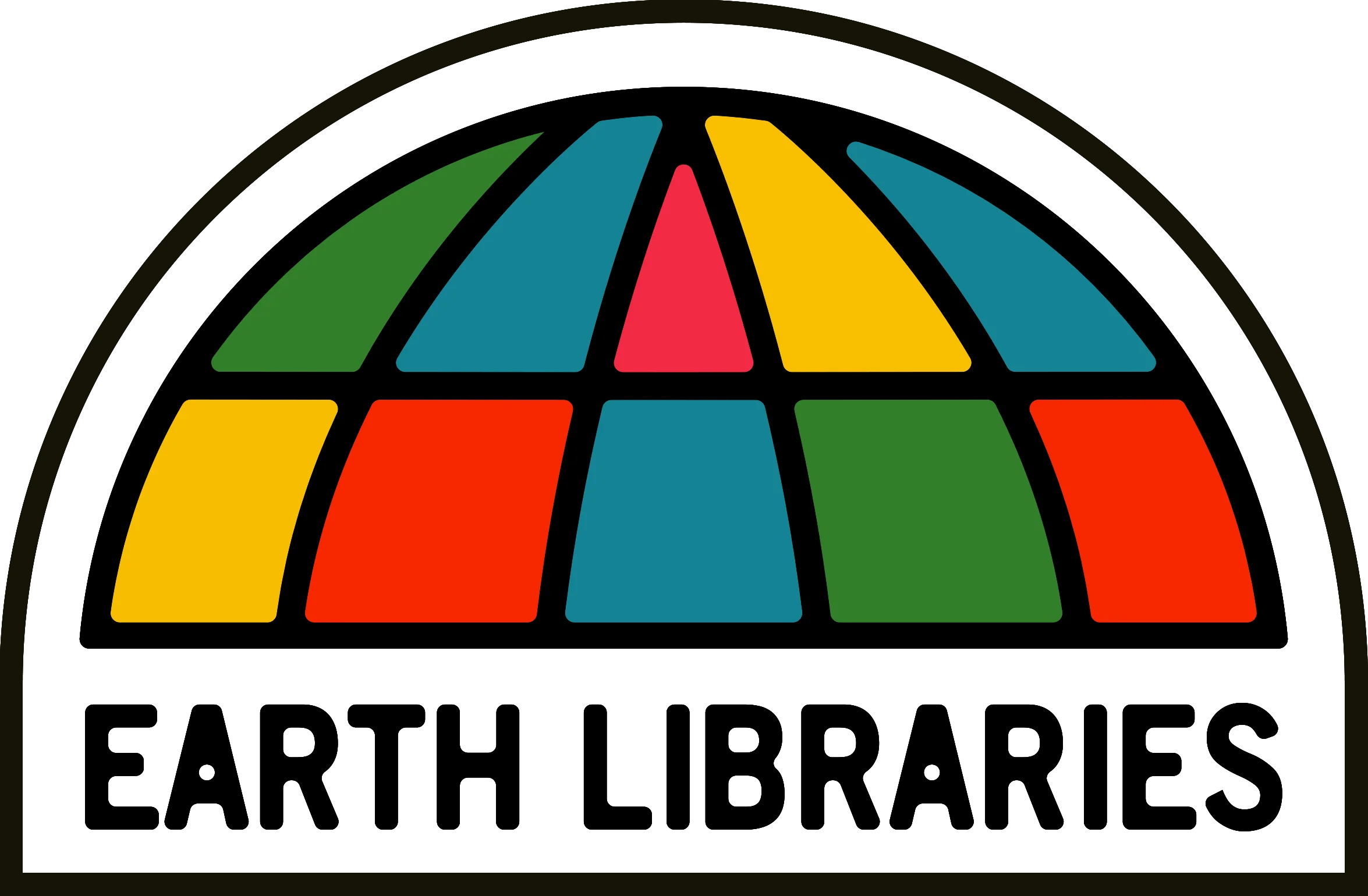
- Founded: 2018
- Founder: Bryant Saxon
- Distributor: Redeye Distribution
- Genre: Various
- Country of origin: United States
- Location: Birmingham, Alabama
- Official website: earthlibraries.com

Earth Libraries is an American independent record label based in Birmingham, Alabama. Founded in 2018 by Bryant Saxon, the label releases contemporary independent music alongside archival and vintage recordings. The label's catalog has included indie rock, folk, experimental music, soul, gospel, electronic music, soundtrack work, and archival releases.

Earth Libraries has become known for combining contemporary independent releases with reissues, soundtrack albums, and previously unreleased recordings.

== History ==
Earth Libraries was founded in Birmingham, Alabama in 2018. Early coverage described the label as focused on both new music and vintage recordings, documenting lesser-known regional artists while also releasing contemporary independent acts.

The label has also been profiled by music industry outlet Other Record Labels, citing Earth Libraries' visual identity, artist curation, and archival reissue work, including projects connected to composer Suzanne Ciani.

== Artists and releases ==
Earth Libraries has released music by contemporary independent artists including Star Moles, Lady Dan, Bory, Friend of a Friend, John Andrews & The Yawns, The Mellons, Salvo, Wray, Will Stewart, TWÏNS, and Angel Abaya. The label's archival and soundtrack projects have included releases connected to notable musicians including Suzanne Ciani, Johnny Shines, The Octopus Project, Mad Anthony, Baker Knight, Roscoe Robinson, Dogwood, R. Stevie Moore and Wayne Perkins. Soundtrack releases have included A Life in Waves, featuring music by Suzanne Ciani, and Butterfly in the Sky, featuring music by The Octopus Project. Earth Libraries has additionally issued recordings connected to gospel and soul singer Roscoe Robinson and guitarist Wayne Perkins, both of whom later received obituary coverage in The New York Times recognizing their broader musical legacies. The label has also released music by Way Dynamic, including the albums Duck and So Familiar.

Wray's 2020 album Stream of Youth / Blank World was released through Earth Libraries. Tinnitist noted that the release combined shoegaze, dream pop, and alternative rock influences.

Lady Dan's 2021 album I Am the Prophet was released by Earth Libraries. The album blended "country-folk and slacker rock" while exploring themes of religion and identity.

That year the label also released the soundtrack to the 2020 documentary film Jasper Mall, featuring music by Baker Knight, HAHA Mart, and Chayse Porter. The soundtrack received a limited Record Store Day vinyl release in 2021.

TWÏNS released their 2022 debut The Human Jazz and the 2025 follow-up Healing Dreams through Earth Libraries. It's Psychedelic Baby Magazine described the sophomore album as inspired by dream states and psychedelic pop traditions, whereas Aquarium Drunkard included it on their 2025 Year in Review list and described it as "weaving a comforting medley of warmly obtuse, jazz-rooted artifacts".

In 2023, Earth Libraries released Bory's 2023 album Who's a Good Boy, which was described as a full-length debut from Brenden Ramirez's power pop project.

Friend of a Friend's 2025 album Desire! was reviewed by The Big Takeover, which described the release as blending goth folk, electronic, dark pop, and post-punk styles.

In 2026, John Andrews & The Yawns released the album STREETSWEEPER through Earth Libraries. Aquarium Drunkard described the album as reflecting Andrews' experiences living and working in New York City. The album is also cataloged by AllMusic.

Also in 2026, Earth Libraries began producing an anthology series of double LP records, created in collaboration with the founders of Tellus Audio Cassette Magazine. Tracks on the Anthology records are remastered from the original cassette masters and packaged with archival photos. Tellus Audio Cassette Magazine Anthology Volume I contains liner notes written by Thurston Moore of Sonic Youth.

== Covers ==
Music publication Raven Sings the Blues has covered multiple Earth Libraries-related releases, including projects by TWÏNS, The Mellons, Hot Apple Band, and Sunfruits.

== Discography and databases ==
Earth Libraries is listed in music databases including AllMusic and Album of the Year.
