= Andrew Beck =

Andrew Beck may refer to:

- Andrew Beck (American football) (born 1996), American football tight end and fullback
- Andrew Beck (musician) (born 1986), American artist and musician
- Andrzej Beck (1926–2011), Polish-American engineer and businessman, also known as Andrew J. Beck
