= Roscoe Robinson =

Roscoe Robinson may refer to:

- Roscoe Robinson Jr. (1928–1993), United States Army general
- Roscoe Robinson (musician) (1928–2026), American musician
