= Friend of a Friend =

Friend of a friend is a human contact that exists because of a mutual friend.

Friend of a Friend may refer to:

- "Friend of a Friend" (Foo Fighters song), 1992
- "Friend of a Friend" (Lake Malawi song), 2019
- "Friend of a Friend" (The Smile song), 2024
- Friend of a Friend (band)
- "Friend of a Friend", a 2013 song by Tim McGraw on the album Two Lanes of Freedom
- "Friend of a Friend", a 2016 song by Weezer on Weezer (White Album)

== See also ==
- FOAF, machine-readable ontology describing people, their activities, and relations to others
