= Mad Anthony (disambiguation) =

Mad Anthony is a nickname for Anthony Wayne.

Mad Anthony may also refer to:

- Mad Anthony (folk rock band)
- Mad Anthony (punk rock band)
