= Dan Lord =

Dan Lord is a composer, author, and cartoonist best known as the lead singer and songwriter of the U.S. rock band Pain (1994–2000) and lead singer and co-songwriter of the new lineup Salvo since 2019.

== Personal life ==
Dan Lord attended high school at McGill–Toolen Catholic High School. In 1994 in Tuscaloosa, he, Adam Guthrie, and Mark Milewicz formed the band Pain which was active throughout the 1990s with the band releasing several albums and performing nationally on tour.

In 2000, while the band was talking with interested record labels, Lord shut down Pain to pursue his religious calling. Lord received his Master of Theology from University of Dallas, married, became an author, and as of January 2013, lived in Mount Pleasant, South Carolina and taught at Cathedral of Saint John the Baptist in nearby Charleston. In a 2019 interview, he mentioned the abrupt dissolution of Pain and the subsequent effects on band members' lives as a still sensitive subject among the previous band's members.

During this period, he authored a fantasy/thriller trilogy, the individual titles of which are By the Downward Way (2014), From A Dark Wayover (2016), and A Fantastic Confluence (2017). Lord also wrote the Catholic theological work, Choosing Joy for the Catholic publisher "Our Sunday Visitor", which asked him to author a book on Choosing Joy.

In 2019, he and the former members of Pain reformed the band under the new lineup "Salvo" which then released the album Off the Charts on the same year.
