= Salvo (band) =

American pop-punk-rock-ska band

- Also known as: Pain
- Origin: Tuscaloosa, Alabama, US
- Genres: Pop punk; punk rock; ska
- Years active: 1994–2000; 2019–2026
- Labels: Vegas; Earth Libraries
- Members: Tommy Bowen; Niamh Tuohy Fields; Adam Guthrie; Will Hudson; Christopher Johnson; George Kennedy; Dan Lord; Stuart McNair; Jason Reid; Rachael Roberts; Melanie Rodgers; Kim Scott; Demondrae Thurman; Rachael Wilson
- Past members: Liz Milewicz; Mark "Pose" Milewicz
- Website: salvo.band

Salvo (formerly Pain) is a 14-member band from the southeastern United States. Originally formed by Alabama high school friends, Pain played music variously described as pop punk, punk rock, and ska; toured worldwide; and released four albums. Though the group was effectively in stasis after the bandleader left. They reformed in 2019 as Salvo, and re-debuted with a new album called Off the Charts. They would go on to release two more albums, an acoustic companion, and an EP. They formally disbanded in 2026.

== History ==
Pain was formed in Tuscaloosa, Alabama in 1994 by McGill–Toolen Catholic High School friends Dan Lord (born in 1970 or 1971), Mark "Pose" Milewicz, and Adam Guthrie. Guthrie was a guitarist-songwriter, Milewicz played bass guitar, and Lord became the band's songwriter and lead singer.

Pain logo from the 1990s

In 1998, Ted Turner contacted Pain's publicist and contracted with the band to produce some original music for Jabberjaw. The "pop-punk four-piece rock band with a three-piece horn section and keyboards", over its six years, performed on MTV2, shared a ticket with The Mighty Mighty Bosstones, received airtime on the radio, worked with The WB, sold CDs worldwide, and was even shut down mid-song by another band—Train—for drawing away their fans at a 1999 concert.

In 2000, while the band was talking with interested record labels, Lord shut down Pain to pursue his religious calling. Lord received his Master of Theology from University of Dallas, married, became an author, and as of January 2013, lived in Mount Pleasant, South Carolina and taught at Cathedral of Saint John the Baptist in nearby Charleston. In 2019, Lord's abrupt dissolution of Pain, and the subsequent effects on band members' lives, were still a touchy subject with those involved.

In the years leading up to 2019, Lord continued writing music and found that most of his new material was best-suited as Pain songs. Reconnecting with Guthrie, the two agreed that these new tracks should be recorded and released. When Milewicz declined to return, Lord and Guthrie felt it was inappropriate to call the group Pain without one of its co-founders, and so they called the new lineup Salvo. After what their new record label (Earth Libraries) called "a gigantic break", Salvo was scheduled to release the first album under the new name (Off the Charts) in Mobile, Alabama on September 13, 2019.

== Membership ==
Lord, Guthrie, and Milewicz formed Pain in 1994. George Kennedy joined on drums in 1998, and Milewicz' wife Liz played keyboard. In Guthrie's 2019 interview with BroadwayWorld, he recalled that there was a "feeling of 'us against them'" between the founding band members and those who joined after the fact, almost a hierarchy where older members outranked the newer ones.

Salvo's lineup hails from all across the southeastern United States: South Carolina, Georgia, Alabama (Birmingham, Spanish Fort, Mobile), and New Orleans. Lord, Guthrie, and Kennedy returned as lead vocalist, guitarist, and drummer respectively. Other Pain alumni that returned were Stuart McNair on horns and accordion; Niamh Tuohy Fields on violin; George Kennedy on drums; Jason Reid; Christopher Johnson; and Demondrae Thurman. New members of the ensemble include Will Hudson, Rachael Wilson, Melanie Rodgers, Kim Scott, Rachael Roberts, and Tommy Bowen.

== Music ==
In February 1997, Lord took to the band's website to categorically deny that Pain was a ska band: "There are a lot of styles we emulate and ain't none of 'em from the island of Jamaica. So please, PLEASE, unless you're just havin' some fun with us, don't call us a ska band." Despite this, Art Howard in Feedback described the band as "pop-ska-punk" in 1999, saying "their songs are actually bouncy, upbeat anthems about 'kooky kids, lovely girls, and people we hate.'" In 2013, The Post and Courier described Pain's music as punk rock, known for its "upbeat lyrics and melodies, including a horn section, and Lord's semi-hyperactive antics." BroadwayWorld made comparisons to Green Day and Fishbone in their 2019 article. Lord himself boiled down Pain's musical style to "happy".

Salvo continues Pain's tradition of "being real heavy on the melodies and horn parts and being upbeat", though Lord noted subtle, indescribable changes due to the band's age that allow the band's product to sound like Pain, evolved. Earth Libraries described Salvo's music as similar to Pain's, but with "a new maturity and mastery". AL.com described Salvo's pop punk offerings as similar to an eclectic Green Day, the horns & guitars evoked The Mighty Mighty Bosstones, and the "incisive yet playful intelligence in the lyrics" calls to mind Barenaked Ladies and They Might Be Giants.

=== Albums ===
Pain released four albums. Midgets with Guns album was released in Australia in mid-1997, while the single off that record ("Square Pegs") was available for US$6 (equivalent to $12.03 in 2025). Wonderful Beef was released in the United States on November 18, 1997; the album has 13 songs, including "The Song of the Seven Inch Cowboy". Full Speed Ahead was scheduled to be released by Vegas Records on October 19, 1999.

Salvo's 2019 album was a crowdfunding success: Off the Charts was recorded at Ol Elegante in Birmingham, Alabama, and was planned for release on CD, vinyl, and digitally. A release party was scheduled for September 13 & 14, 2019 in Mobile, Alabama.

== Reception ==
According to AL.com, Pain had "big following[s]" in the southeastern and West Coast of the United States. In 2019, filmmaker Rebecca Pugh (fiancée to Adam Guthrie) premiered her documentary film about Pain, Anthem for the Middle Aged Band in Birmingham, Alabama.

At Salvo's first performance in Birmingham, Alabama in May 2019, the venue was sold out. Salvo drummer George Kennedy said, "The coolest thing about that show was, I thought it was going to be a bunch of old geezers like us, […] It was a bunch of people who could not have been more than 2 years old when Pain broke up, singing every lyric to us. The whole experience was euphoric."
