= I Am the Prophet =

Studio album by Lady Dan
- Released: April 23, 2021
- Genres: Indie rock, alt-country, Americana, indie folk
- Label: Earth Libraries
- Producer: Jeremy Clark

I Am the Prophet is the debut studio album by American indie rock project Lady Dan, released on April 23, 2021, through Earth Libraries. The album received positive reviews from publications including The Guardian, Clash, The Arts Desk, and The Line of Best Fit.

== Background ==
The album was written by Tyler Dozier and explores themes of religion, identity, grief, relationships, and personal transformation. According to Earth Libraries, the album combines "intensely personal storytelling, poetic imagery, biblical allusion, immaculate arrangements, and crackling songwriting."

Prior to the album's release, singles including "I Am the Prophet", "No Home", and "Misandrist To Most" were featured by Stereogum.

== Critical reception ==
Writing for The Guardian, Kitty Empire described the album as a "farewell to Christ and creeps" and praised its lyrical honesty and blend of country-folk and indie rock influences.

The Arts Desk described the album as "a striking debut" centered around confessional songwriting and understated arrangements.

Clash praised the album's "warm Americana textures" and emotional directness.

== Track listing ==
All tracks written by Tyler Dozier.

1. "Paradox" – 3:13
2. "Dogs" – 3:35
3. "Better Off Alone" – 3:19
4. "Plagiarist's Blues" – 3:49
5. "I Am the Prophet" – 3:34
6. "Intro To Loss" – 0:44
7. "No Home" – 3:39
8. "Misandrist To Most" – 3:28
9. "The Hanged Man" – 3:09
10. "Just the Two of Us" – 4:29

== Personnel ==
Credits adapted from the album liner notes and Bandcamp.

=== Musicians ===
- Tyler Dozier – vocals, guitar, songwriting
- Aksel Coe – drums
- Josh Stirm – electric guitar
- Matthew Chancey – bass
- Jeremy Clark – keyboards, percussion, accordion
- Eddy Dunlap – pedal steel
- Laura Epling – violin
- Ian Robinson – cello
- Andrew Golden – trumpet
- David Williford – saxophone

=== Technical ===
- Jeremy Clark – recording, production, engineering, mixing
- Adam Ayan – mastering
