= Will Stewart (musician) =

American singer-songwriter from Alabama

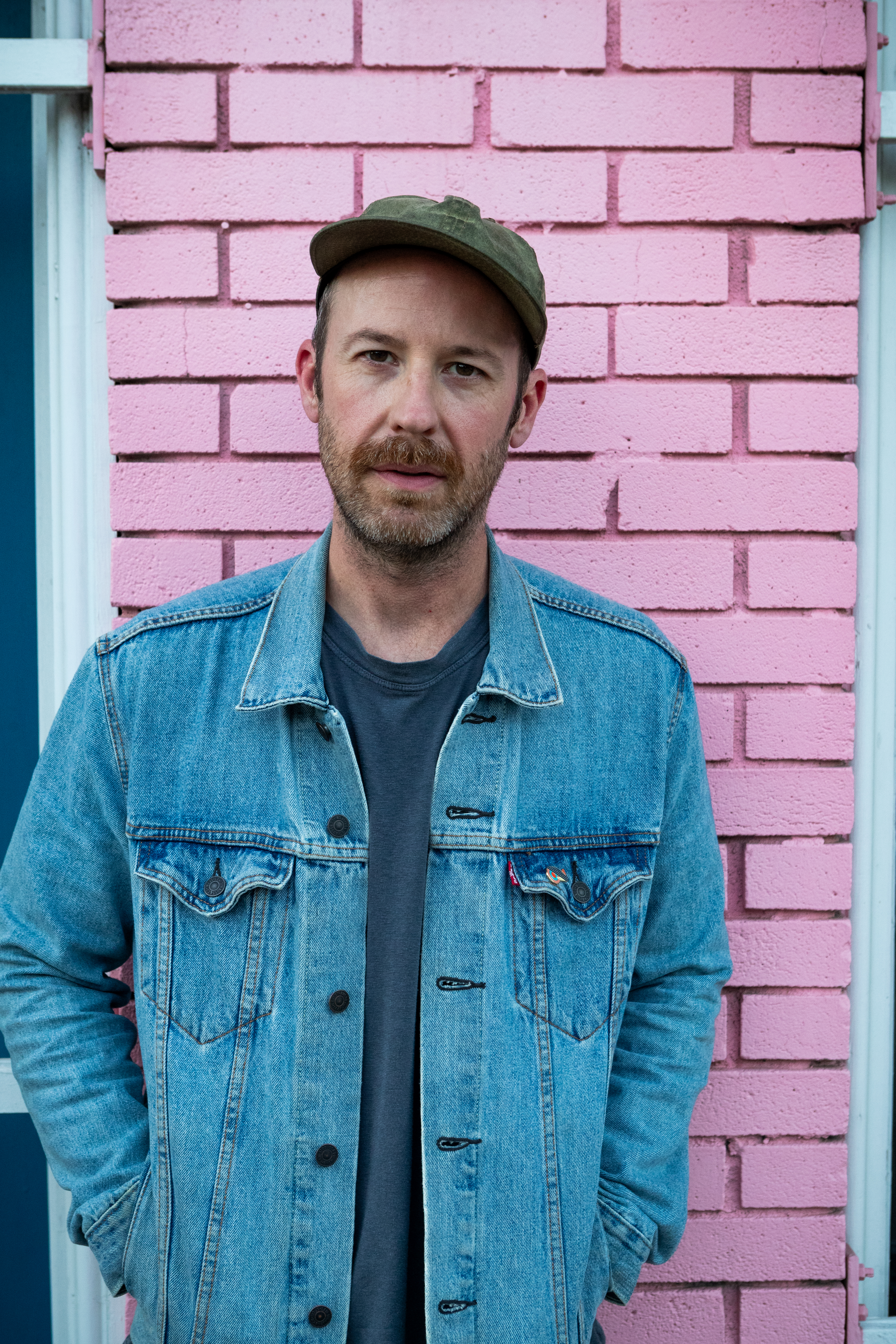

Background information
- Origin: Birmingham, Alabama, U.S.
- Genres: Americana, country rock, roots rock
- Occupations: Singer-songwriter, guitarist
- Years active: 2010s–present
- Labels: Cornelius Chapel Records, Earth Libraries

Will Stewart is an American singer-songwriter, guitarist, and recording artist from Alabama. His work combines elements of Americana, country rock, roots rock, and Southern storytelling. Stewart emerged from Birmingham's independent music scene during the 2010s and gained wider recognition following the release of his 2018 album County Seat. In January 2018, he was included in Rolling Stone's list of "10 New Country Artists You Need to Know".

== Early life and education ==
Stewart was born and raised in Montgomery, Alabama. He studied classical guitar while attending Baldwin Magnet Junior High School and later earned a degree in communications from the University of Alabama. After living in Birmingham, he spent several years in Nashville working as a freelance musician before returning to Alabama.

== Career ==
Prior to establishing himself as a solo artist, Stewart performed in several groups, including the Birmingham band Timber and the Nashville-based band Willie and the Giant. Following his return to Alabama, he began focusing on his solo career while becoming an active participant in Birmingham's music community.

In 2018, Stewart released his first full-length solo album, County Seat, through Cornelius Chapel Records. The album attracted national attention, with coverage from publications including Rolling Stone and American Songwriter. Reviewing the album, Americana Highways described it as a notable contribution to contemporary Americana music, while Americana UK highlighted Stewart's songwriting and regional perspective.

Local media coverage during this period identified Stewart as one of a number of Birmingham musicians receiving increasing national attention. A profile in B-Metro noted that his music had received support from outlets including KEXP and national music publications.

Stewart's second album, Way Gone, was released in 2020. Critics noted its concise songwriting, understated arrangements, and blend of folk, country, and rock influences.

In 2021, Stewart collaborated with fellow Alabama songwriter Sarah Lee Langford on the album Bad Luck & Love. The project was reviewed by American Songwriter, which highlighted the partnership between the two artists.

Stewart released Slow Life in 2022. Reviews characterized the album as guitar-driven roots rock with influences from jangle pop, Americana, and classic country music.

His fourth studio album, Moon Winx, was released in 2025. The album was named after the former Moon Winx Lodge motel in Tuscaloosa, Alabama. Writing in Shindig!, critic Camilla Aisa described the record as a collection of character-driven songs rooted in Southern imagery, folklore, and regional history. The review compared aspects of the album's sound to artists including Drive-By Truckers, Richmond Fontaine, and Wilco.

Prior to the album's release, several tracks received premiere coverage from independent music publications. Under the Radar premiered "Late for the Banquet", while Raven Sings the Blues premiered "Firebird Fever".

== Musical style ==
Critics have variously described Stewart's music as Americana, roots rock, country rock, and Southern rock. His songwriting frequently draws upon Southern settings, regional history, fictional characters, and literary narratives. Reviews of his work have noted influences ranging from traditional country and folk music to jangle pop and classic rock.

== Discography ==
=== Studio albums ===
- County Seat (2018)
- Way Gone (2020)
- Slow Life (2022)
- Moon Winx (2025)

=== Collaborative albums ===
- Bad Luck & Love (with Sarah Lee Langford) (2021)
