= Jaylon Carlies =

American football player (born 2001)

No. 57 – Indianapolis Colts
- Position: Linebacker
- Roster status: Injured reserve

Personal information
- Born: September 13, 2001 (age 25); Orlando, Florida, U.S.
- Listed height: 6 ft 3 in (1.91 m)
- Listed weight: 227 lb (103 kg)

Career information
- High school: West Orange (Winter Garden, Florida)
- College: Missouri (2020–2023)
- NFL draft: 2024: 5th round, 151st overall pick

Career history
- Indianapolis Colts (2024–present)

Career NFL statistics as of 2024
- Total tackles: 36
- Sacks: 1.0
- Pass deflections: 1
- Stats at Pro Football Reference

Jaylon Carlies (Pronounced: "CAR-lize") (born September 13, 2001) is an American professional football linebacker for the Indianapolis Colts of the National Football League (NFL). He played college football for the Missouri Tigers and was selected by the Colts in the fifth round of the 2024 NFL draft.

== Early life ==
Carlies grew up in Orlando, Florida and attended West Orange High School where he lettered in football and track and field. He was regarded as an elite sprinter at the high school level and began his football journey as a wide receiver on the West Orange team.

Coming out of high school, Carlies was rated as a three-star recruit, where he decided to commit to play college football for the Missouri Tigers.

Carlies was 6-foot-1 at the time of high school graduation but continued to grow into his college years, topping out just shy of 6'3".

== College career ==
In Carlies' freshman season in 2020, he notched eight tackles. In week two of the 2021 season, Carlies got his first career start which he took advantage of notching four tackles, an interception, and a forced fumble versus Kentucky. In week ten, Carlies had two goal line stops and an interceptions against #1 Georgia. In the 2021 season, Carlies totaled 67 tackles with three being for a loss, and a team-leading four interceptions. Carlies finished the 2022 season with 81 tackles, a sack, four pass deflections, three interceptions, and a forced fuble.

In the 2023 Cotton Bowl Carlies led the Tigers with 11 tackles as he helped Missouri beat Ohio State. Carlies finished the 2023 season with 64 tackles with four and a half being for a loss, two sacks, five pass deflections, two interceptions, a fumble recovery, and a forced fumble. After the conclusion of the 2023 season, Carlies decided to declare for the 2024 NFL draft.

Carlies finished his career with the Tigers by playing in 49 games making 39 starts where he totaled 221 tackles, three sacks, 17 pass deflections, nine interceptions, three forced fumbles, and a fumble recovery.

== Professional career ==
Pre-draft measurables
Height	Weight	Arm length	Hand span	Wingspan	40-yard dash	10-yard split	20-yard split	20-yard shuttle	Three-cone drill	Vertical jump	Broad jump	Bench press
6 ft 2 3/4 in (1.90 m)	227 lb (103 kg)	34 1/4 in (0.87 m)	10 in (0.25 m)	6 ft 8 5/8 in (2.05 m)	4.50 s	1.54 s	2.66 s	4.46 s	7.03 s	34.5 in (0.88 m)	10 ft 5 in (3.18 m)	22 reps
All values from NFL Combine/Pro Day

Carlies was drafted by the Indianapolis Colts in the fifth round, with the 151st overall selection, of the 2024 NFL draft. Prior to offseason camp, the Colts announced that Carlies would shift from safety to linebacker.

In rookie training camp, the Colts carried through on their promise and by the end of July he had risen to third on the team's linebacker depth chart, behind starters Zaire Franklin and E. J. Speed. He played in 10 games with six starts as a rookie, recording 36 tackles, one sack and one pass deflection.

On April 21, 2025, general manager Chris Ballard announced that Carlies had undergone surgery to repair a shoulder injury. He was activated from injured reserve on December 6, allowing him to make his season debut in Week 14 against the Jacksonville Jaguars.
