= The Mellons =

American baroque pop band

- Origin: Salt Lake City, United States
- Genres: Baroque pop; Sunshine pop; Psychedelic rock; Rock and roll
- Years active: 2020–present
- Members: Andrew Beck; Denney Fuller; Ian Francis; Rob Jepson
- Website: www.themellonsmusic.com

The Mellons is an American Psychedelic rock/Baroque pop band formed in 2020 and based at Salt Lake City, Utah. The band consists of Ian Francis (percussion, drums), Denney Fuller (vocals, bass, horns), Andrew Beck (vocals, guitar, keys) and Rob Jepson (vocals, guitar, keys). The band are signed to Earth Libraries. The Mellons first album Introducing…The Mellons was released on October 21, 2022.

== History ==
=== Formation and background ===
The band was formed in roughly 2020. Members Andrew Beck and Rob Jepson met during their first year of high school in Provo, Utah. Andrew Beck is a former and early member of Imagine Dragons, and since 2008 going in different acts. After Beck's last release with former band Day Sounds in 2019, he and Jepson decided to form a baroque pop band during the COVID-19 pandemic with producer Dennis Fuller and Ian Francis with the writing of their first songs "Devil's Advocate" and "What a Time to be Alive". The band later signed with the indie record label Earth Libraries.

=== Musical style and influences ===
The Mellons are mainly described as 60s psych pop, and baroque pop. The band, sonically inspired by The Beach Boys album Pet Sounds. Jepson stated that he was introduced from his older siblings to bands like Cat Stevens, Van Morrison, The Beatles, Simon & Garfunkel, which helped to craft the 60s style from the band. Andrew Christiansen of SLUG Magazine stated that the band sounds similar to the combination of The Beach Boys, The Turtles and Harpers Bizarre.

=== Recordings and Introducing... The Mellons! ===
At the beginning of 2020, The Mellons started to write and record their first album in No. 9 Studios at Salt Lake City. On october 27, 2021, The Mellons released their debut single "So Much To Say" alongside a music video directed by Beck, and filmed by Brennen Bateman. In 2022, the band announced the release of their debut album Introducing... The Mellons! expected on September 16, 2022, and premiered the music video for their single "What a Time to be Alive" on May 20, 2022. The music video was directed by Beck and Shot by Bateman and features a 70s child-like TV show with puppets by Shelby Rickart from Puppets in the City.

On July 28 2022 they released their third single from the album, "Hello, Sun".

== Discography ==
=== Studio Albums ===
Album	Details	Singles
Introducing…The Mellons	Released: October 21 2022; Label: Earth Libraries; Format: Digital, Vinyl.	1. "So Much to Say"; 2. "What a Time to Be Alive"; 3. "Hello Sun"
The Mellons In Color	Released: June 19 2026; Label: Earth Libraries; Format: Digital, Vinyl.	1. "Black & White"; 2. "Things Gone By"; 3. "Say Goodbye"; 4. "Lady Apple Tree"

=== Singles ===
- "Salad Made of Butterflies" (2021)
- "So Much To Say" (2021)
- "What A Time To Be Alive" (2022)
- "Hallo, Sun" (2022)
- "Make Me Feel" (2023)
- "Tell Me Why b/w Please Baby Please" (2024)
- "From The Vine" (2025)
- "Black & White" (2026)
- "Things Gone By" (2026)
- "Say Goodbye" (2026)
- "Lady Apple Tree" (2026)
