= Lady Dan =

American indie rock and alt-country music project

- Born: Tyler Dozier
- Origin: Austin, Texas, U.S.
- Genres: Indie rock, Alt-country, Americana, Indie folk
- Occupation: Singer-songwriter
- Years active: 2018–present
- Label: Earth Libraries

Lady Dan is the musical project of American singer-songwriter Tyler Dozier. Based in Austin, Texas, with roots in Alabama, Lady Dan blends indie rock, alt-country, Americana, and indie folk influences.

Lady Dan gained wider recognition with the release of the debut album I Am the Prophet in 2021, which received favorable reviews from publications including The Guardian, Clash, The Arts Desk, and Louder Than War.

== Background ==
Tyler Dozier was raised in Alabama in a conservative Christian environment before relocating to Austin, Texas. Her songwriting frequently explores themes of religion, relationships, identity, grief, and personal transformation.

== Career ==
Lady Dan began releasing music independently in the late 2010s, building a following in the Austin music scene.

In 2021, Lady Dan released the debut studio album I Am the Prophet through Earth Libraries. The album received positive critical attention for its confessional songwriting and blend of indie rock, folk, and alt-country influences.

Several singles from the album, including "I Am the Prophet", "No Home", and "Misandrist To Most", were covered by Stereogum.

In 2022, Lady Dan released additional singles including "Not In Love" and "Better Off Alone".

Lady Dan was also featured on NPR Music's New Music Friday and New Mix programming.

== Musical style ==
Critics have described Lady Dan's music as a blend of indie rock, Americana, alt-country, folk, and chamber pop. Reviewers have also noted Dozier's introspective and autobiographical songwriting style.

== Discography ==
=== Studio albums ===
- I Am the Prophet (2021)

=== EPs ===
- Songs for the Soulless (2019)

=== Singles ===
- "Facta, Non Verba" (2020)
- "I Am the Prophet" (2021)
- "No Home" (2021)
- "Misandrist To Most" (2021)
- "Better Off Alone" (2021)
- "Just the Two of Us" (2021)
- "Not In Love" (2022)
- "Fuck The Stars" (2022)
- "You Want It Darker" (2022)
- "If We Make It Through December" (2022)
