= Dogwood (Alabama band) =

American country rock band from Alabama

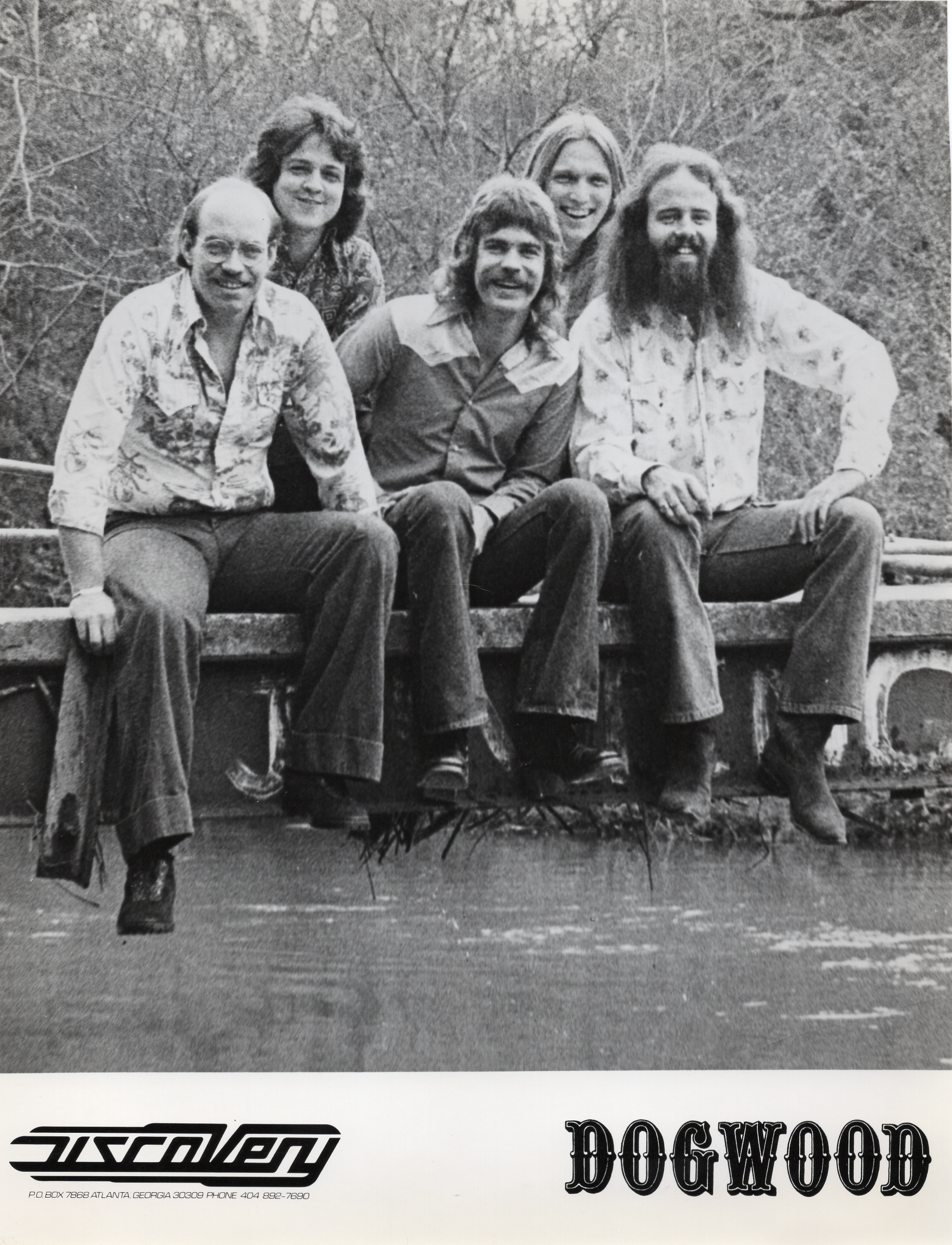

Background information
- Origin: Montevallo, Alabama, U.S.
- Genres: Country rock, Southern rock, folk rock
- Years active: c. 1971–1975
- Label: Earth Libraries

Dogwood was an American country rock band from Montevallo, Alabama, active primarily during the early 1970s. Formed by musicians associated with the University of Montevallo, the group performed throughout Alabama and the southeastern United States and became part of the region's country rock scene. Although the band recorded during its original existence, most of its recordings remained unreleased until archival releases began appearing in the 2020s.

== History ==
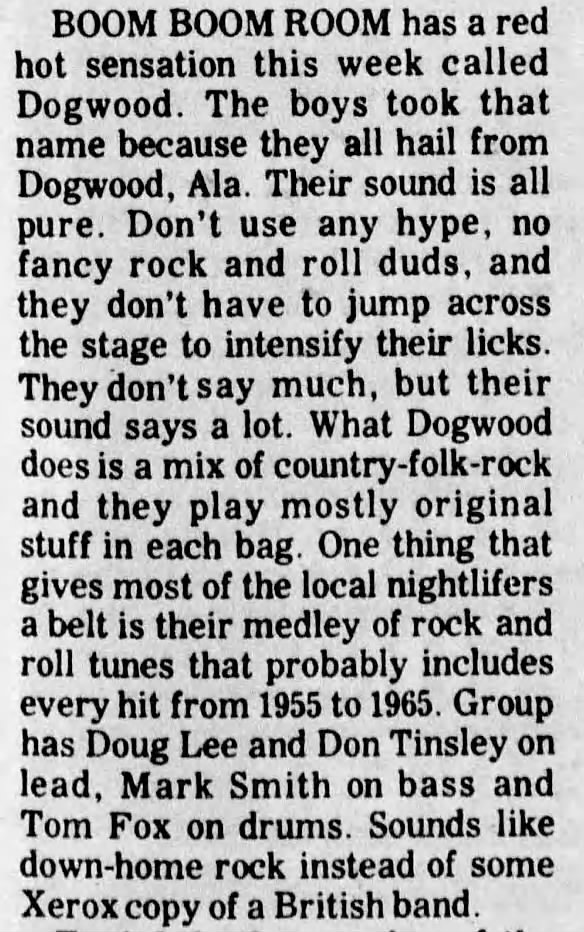
Dogwood, The Birmingham News, 1974-01-11, Page 57

Dogwood was formed in Montevallo, Alabama, in 1971. According to the Birmingham Music Archive, the group's name was derived from the Dogwood community near Montevallo, where members rehearsed at a farmhouse known as the "Dogwood House".

The band's early membership included Don Tinsley, J. D. Harris, Doug Lee, Tom Fox, and Mark Smith. Later lineups also included Jim Liner, Dave Miller, and Rick Byrd.

In May 1973, the University of Montevallo student newspaper The Alabamian published a feature article on the band describing Dogwood as a group of "goodtime musicians". The article documented the band's efforts to secure a recording contract and noted plans for recording sessions in Atlanta, with recordings being submitted to industry contacts associated with Capricorn Records and producer John Boylan.

In January 1974, entertainment columnist Dennis Washburn of The Birmingham News described Dogwood as a "new sensation" in Birmingham's club scene. Washburn identified the group as consisting of Don Tinsley, J. D. Harris, Tom Fox, and Mark Smith and noted that the band performed primarily original material.

Dogwood toured throughout the southeastern United States during the mid-1970s. Contemporary advertisements document appearances across Alabama, including performances in Montgomery and Birmingham.

According to retrospective accounts, the band performed alongside nationally known artists including Lou Reed, Robin Trower, Dion, Flo & Eddie, and The Commodores during its touring years.

The group recorded material during its original run and reportedly attracted interest from record labels, though no major-label recordings were released at the time.

== Reunions ==
Following the band's dissolution, its members remained active in Alabama music. More than four decades later, Dogwood reunited and recorded new material featuring members of the original lineup. The reunion was documented by the Shelby County Reporter, which covered the band's return and release of a new CD.

The reunited group also appeared at Birmingham's Secret Stages Music Discovery Festival in 2017.

== Archival recordings ==
Most of Dogwood's original recordings remained unreleased for decades. Beginning in 2025, recordings from the band's 1970s sessions began to receive commercial release.

The first archival release, "A Prairie Song", was issued in December 2025. According to release notes, the recording was written by Don Tinsley, recorded at East Avalon Recorders in Muscle Shoals, Alabama, and produced by Paul Hornsby.

Additional archival releases included:

- "Minnesota Turnpike"
- "It Was Easy"
- "Prairie Ships"

The releases brought renewed attention to recordings that had remained unavailable since the band's original existence.

== Legacy ==
The band's history was later highlighted by the Birmingham Music Archive as part of its efforts to document Alabama's musical heritage. In 2025, coverage of the archive's Don Tinsley exhibit noted Dogwood's role in Alabama's regional music scene during the early 1970s.

== Members ==
- Don Tinsley – vocals, guitar
- J. D. Harris – vocals, bass
- Doug Lee – vocals, guitar
- Tom Fox – vocals, drums
- Mark Smith – guitar, bass
- Jim Liner – keyboards, bass
- Dave Miller – piano, harmonica
- Rick Byrd – guitar, steel guitar, banjo

== Discography ==
=== Archival singles ===
- "A Prairie Song" (2025)
- "Minnesota Turnpike" (2026)
- "It Was Easy" (2026)
- "Prairie Ships" (2026)
