= Andrew Beck (musician) =

American artist and musician (born 1986)

Andrew Colin Beck (born May 23, 1986) is an American artist and musician. He was an early member of Imagine Dragons and is currently a member of the Mellons, whilst also maintaining a career as an illustrator.

== Early life ==
Beck studied graphic design at Brigham Young University. After leaving school, Beck worked for Undermanned in Amsterdam, headed by German designer and type designer Erik Spinnaker. Afterwards, Beck and his family traveled the world as he began to work as a freelance illustrator.

== Career ==
=== Music ===
Beck's first performing group was a ska band called The Moon Monsters, in which he played the tenor saxophone at age 15. He played in multiple rock groups leading up to Imagine Dragons, including the Cubes, the Franchise, Don Juan Triumphant and other groups on the Utah music scene.

Beck attended university in his home town of Provo. Beck met Imagine Dragons lead singer Dan Reynolds while studying at Brigham Young University and was recruited, along with actress and musician Aurora Florence, to fill out Dan's vision for the band. Beck played keyboards and guitar, and sang backup vocals. He played on Imagine Dragons' first EP, Speak to Me in 2008. Imagine Dragons won two consecutive Battle of the Bands competitions together before Beck and Florence decided to leave the band in late 2008 after Dan decided to go a different direction musically.

Beck performed with the psychedelic rock band Day Sounds, which released its eponymous EP in October 2019.

Beck now sings co-lead, composes, produces and plays guitar in the four-piece baroque pop group the Mellons, based in Salt Lake City. The band signed with Earth Libraries in August 2021.

=== Art ===
Beck maintains a career as an illustrator, specializing in editorial illustration and cartooning. He has illustrated for many notable publications, such as GQ magazine, Fast Company, the Boston Globe, Playboy, Vanity Fair, The Wall Street Journal, Fortune Magazine, the Institutional Investor, the Washington Post, NPR, the Penn Law Journal, the Huffington Post, the New York Observer, the Hollywood Reporter, Worth Magazine and Men's Health Magazine, among others.
