= Wray (band) =

American shoegaze band from Alabama

- Origin: Birmingham, Alabama, U.S.
- Genres: Shoegaze, dream pop, post-punk, krautrock, alternative rock
- Years active: 2013–present
- Labels: Communicating Vessels, Earth Libraries
- Members: David Brown; David Swatzell; Blake Wimberly

Wray is an American shoegaze and alternative rock band from Birmingham, Alabama, formed in 2013. The band consists of David Brown (bass, vocals), David Swatzell (guitar, vocals), and Blake Wimberly (drums). Their music incorporates elements of shoegaze, dream pop, krautrock, post-punk, and psychedelic rock.

== History ==
Wray was formed in Birmingham, Alabama by musicians involved in the city's underground and punk scenes. The group released its self-titled debut album, Wray, in 2014 through the independent label Communicating Vessels.

The band's early sound drew comparisons to acts such as My Bloody Valentine, Slowdive, and Can, while blending shoegaze textures with rhythmic influences from krautrock and post-punk.

In 2015, The Guardian included Wray in its "Playlist: New Bands" feature, highlighting the song "Relative" and describing the group's sound as "motorik shoegaze".

The band released its second studio album, Hypatia, in 2016. The album received positive reviews from publications including The Wall Street Journal, which described the record as part of "the new sound of shoegaze".

In 2020, Wray released the double album Stream of Youth / Blank World. The project was conceived as two contrasting thematic works, exploring ideas of optimism and disillusionment. The release was covered by outlets including Destroy//Exist, XS Noize, Offshelf, and The Music Bugle.

== Musical style ==
Wray's music has been described as shoegaze, dream pop, alternative rock, and post-punk. Critics have noted the band's use of layered guitars, motorik rhythms, and atmospheric production.

== Members ==
- David Brown – bass, vocals
- David Swatzell – guitar, vocals
- Blake Wimberly – drums

== Discography ==
=== Studio albums ===
- Wray (2014)
- Hypatia (2016)
- Stream of Youth / Blank World (2020)
