= Chris Seise =

American baseball player (born 1999)

- Shortstop
- Born: January 6, 1999 (age 27); Schenectady, New York, U.S.
- Bats: Right Throws: Right

Christopher Seise (born January 6, 1999) is an American former professional baseball shortstop.

== Career ==
Seise attended West Orange High School in Winter Garden, Florida. He committed to play college baseball at the University of Central Florida. He was drafted by the Texas Rangers in the first round, with the 29th overall selection, of the 2017 Major League Baseball draft.

After signing, Seise was assigned to the rookie–level Arizona League Rangers. There, he posted a .336 batting average with three home runs and 27 RBI in 27 games which earned him a promotion to the Low–A Spokane Indians, where he batted .222 with nine RBI in 24 games to end his first professional season. He missed all of 2018 after undergoing rotator cuff surgery. Seise was assigned to the Hickory Crawdads of the Single–A South Atlantic League to open the 2019 season, and appeared in 21 games, hitting .241/.267/.356 with 6 RBI. Seise underwent surgery in early May to repair a torn labrum in his left shoulder and missed the rest of the 2019 season.

Seise did not play in a game in 2020 due to the cancellation of the minor league season because of the COVID-19 pandemic. Seise was assigned to the Hickory Crawdads of the High-A East to open the 2021 season. After just 10 games in 2021, Seise tore the ACL in his right knee, which required season-ending surgery to repair. Seise returned to Hickory for the 2022 season, hitting .246/.319/.384 with 10 home runs, 46 RBI, and 12 stolen bases.

Seise opened the 2023 season with the Frisco RoughRiders of the Double-A Texas League. In 91 games for Frisco, he batted .211/.280/.311 with four home runs, 39 RBI, and 14 stolen bases. Seise elected free agency following the season on November 6, 2023.
