= Mad Anthony (folk rock band) =

- Origin: Cincinnati, Ohio, U.S.
- Genres: Folk rock, country rock, singer-songwriter
- Years active: 1970s
- Label: Earth Libraries

Mad Anthony was an American folk rock and country rock band formed in Cincinnati, Ohio during the 1970s. The group later relocated to Los Angeles and recorded a collection of demo recordings in 1975 that would eventually be released nearly five decades later as The Lost Tapes by the independent label Earth Libraries.

Reviewers compared the group's sound to Crosby, Stills, Nash & Young and Jackson Browne.

== History ==
Mad Anthony formed in Cincinnati during the early 1970s and consisted primarily of John Schwab, Carl Richards, and Larry Dotson. The band performed around Ohio and Kentucky before relocating to California during the mid-1970s in pursuit of a recording career.

In 1975, the band recorded a series of live demos in a barn in Santa Barbara, California using a two-track reel-to-reel recorder and a single microphone. The recordings remained largely unheard outside of friends and family for decades.

According to interviews conducted with John Schwab's son, musician Ben Schwab of Drugdealer, Golden Daze, and Sylvie, the group settled in the San Fernando Valley and performed in clubs around Los Angeles while attempting to secure a record deal.

== The Lost Tapes ==
The Lost Tapes was released by Earth Libraries in 2023. The album received attention from independent music publications for its rediscovered 1970s sound and backstory.

Aquarium Drunkard described the recordings as possessing a "soulful, rootsy folk ethos" recalling CSNY and Jackson Browne.

Santa Barbara Independent highlighted the unusual circumstances surrounding the recordings, noting that the album had been recorded in a Santa Barbara barn nearly 50 years earlier.

The singles "Rina", "Harriet Ann", and "Babe" received coverage from independent music publications including For the Rabbits, Various Small Flames, and Psychedelic Baby Magazine.

The album later received reviews from outlets including Sputnikmusic and college radio station KCSB, which selected the release as an "Add of the Month".

== Style and influences ==
Mad Anthony's music has been described as blending folk rock, country rock, soul, and singer-songwriter influences.

== Discography ==
=== Studio albums ===
- The Lost Tapes (2023)
