= Star Moles =

American musician and songwriter

- Born: Emily Moales
- Origin: New Hampshire, U.S.
- Genres: Indie pop, bedroom pop, indie folk
- Occupations: Musician, songwriter
- Years active: 2017–present

Star Moles is the musical project of American musician and songwriter Emily Moales. Originally from New Hampshire and later based in Philadelphia, Moales has released a large catalog of independent recordings spanning indie pop, bedroom pop, and folk music. The project has received coverage from publications including Pitchfork, Paste, Stereogum, Aquarium Drunkard, Under the Radar, and BrooklynVegan.

== Career ==
Moales began releasing music as Star Moles in 2017. Much of her early work was self-recorded and distributed independently through Bandcamp. In a 2026 interview with Stereogum, Moales stated that Highway to Hell was the project's ninth full-length album and followed dozens of earlier releases.

The album Camelot gained wider attention following its physical release in 2021. Reviewing the album, New Commute noted its use of Arthurian themes and medieval imagery.

In 2025, Star Moles released Snack Monster. Aquarium Drunkard described the album as drawing inspiration from medieval literature and the writings of Andreas Capellanus, while emphasizing acoustic instrumentation and folk-oriented arrangements.

In 2026, Star Moles released Highway to Hell. Produced by Kevin Basko, the album featured contributions from musicians associated with Historic New Jersey Recordings.

== Reception ==
Coverage of Star Moles increased during the mid-2020s through reviews, interviews, and premieres in independent music publications. Paste included Star Moles in its "Best of What's Next" series, highlighting Moales' songwriting and growing profile within independent music circles.

Highway to Hell received reviews from publications including Pitchfork, Paste, Various Small Flames, Turn & Work, Aquarium Drunkard, and New Commute.

Writing for Pitchfork, Lily Goldberg described the album as focusing on everyday life while retaining elements of fantasy and surrealism that had appeared throughout Moales' earlier work.

== Musical style ==
Critics have described Star Moles' music as bedroom pop, indie folk, lo-fi pop, and indie rock.

Reviewers have frequently noted Moales' use of literary and historical themes, including Arthurian legend, medieval literature, and concepts of courtly love.

== Discography ==
=== Studio albums ===
- Camelot (2018)
- Here Lies Captain Joy (2020)
- Three Chimes, At Silent Palace! (2024)
- Snack Monster (2025)
- Highway to Hell (2026)
