= Bubba Thompson =

American baseball player (born 1998)

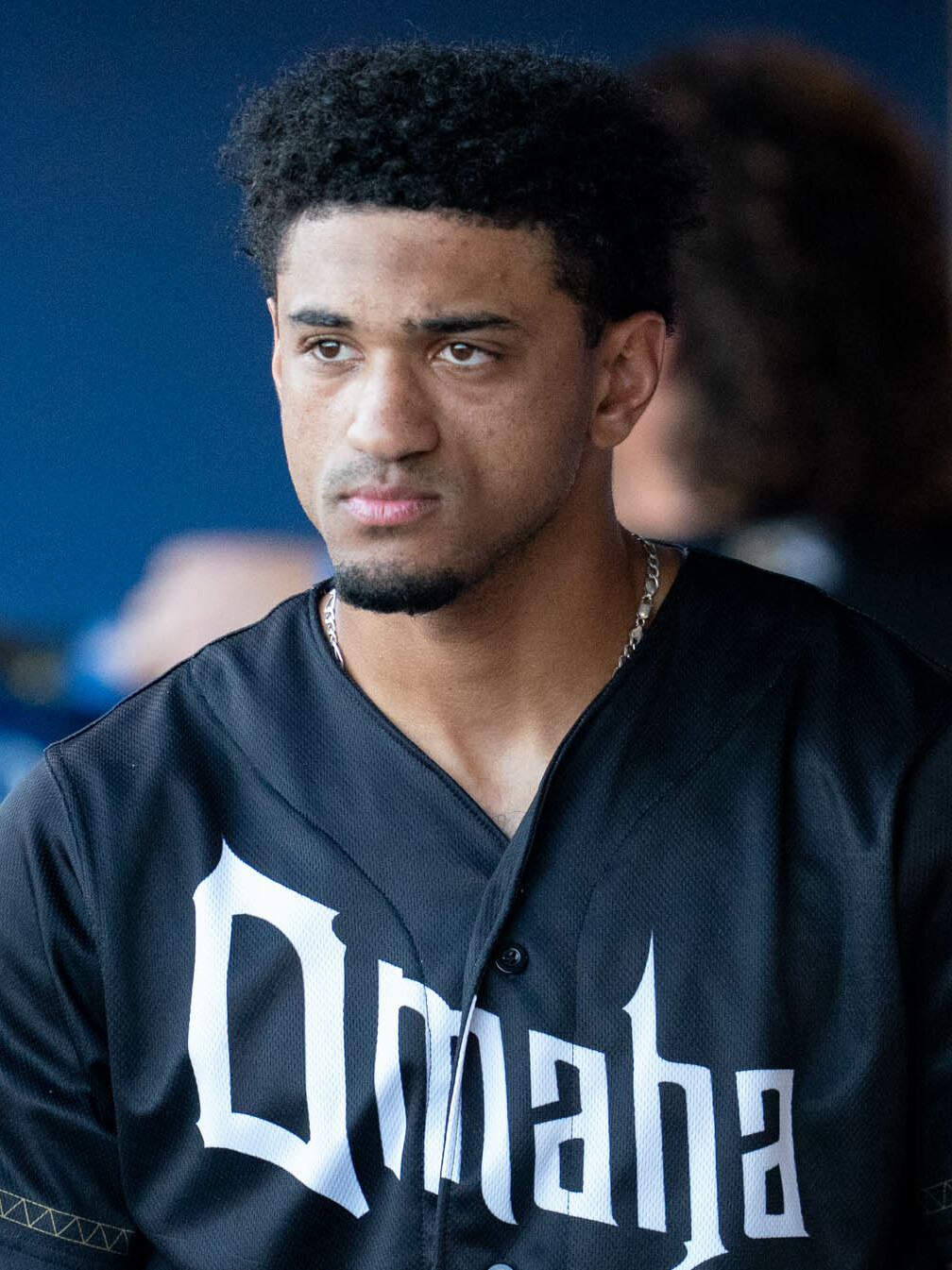
- Thompson with the Omaha Storm Chasers in 2023
- Outfielder
- Born: June 9, 1998 (age 28); Jacksonville, Florida, U.S.
- Batted: Right Threw: Right

MLB debut
- August 4, 2022, for the Texas Rangers

Last MLB appearance
- May 4, 2024, for the Cincinnati Reds

MLB statistics
- Batting average: .232
- Home runs: 1
- Runs batted in: 13
- Stolen bases: 27
- Stats at Baseball Reference

Teams
- Texas Rangers (2022–2023); Cincinnati Reds (2024)

Leslie Arnold "Bubba" Thompson (born June 9, 1998) is an American former professional baseball outfielder and college football quarterback for the West Florida Argonauts. He previously played for the South Alabama Jaguars. He also played in Major League Baseball (MLB) for the Texas Rangers and Cincinnati Reds. Thompson was drafted by the Rangers with the 26th overall pick in the first round of the 2017 MLB draft.

== Amateur career ==
Thompson attended McGill–Toolen Catholic High School in Mobile, Alabama. He played baseball and American football in high school. As a junior in baseball, he hit .469 with 19 stolen bases. During his senior year in football, he led his team to the Class 7A state title game, and passed for 3,173 yards and 38 touchdowns. Thompson was teammates with future NFL wide receiver Jalen Tolbert.

He originally committed to Auburn University to play college baseball, but changed his commitment to the University of Alabama in February 2017. A three-star football recruit, he also received offers to play college football from the University of Tennessee and the University of Mississippi.

Thompson was considered one of the top prospects for the 2017 Major League Baseball draft. Thompson was drafted by the Texas Rangers with the 26th overall pick in the first round of the draft.

== Professional career ==
=== Texas Rangers ===
Thompson officially signed with the Rangers a few days after the draft and was assigned to the AZL Rangers, where he spent the whole season, posting a .257 batting average in 113 at bats with three home runs and 12 RBIs in thirty games. He spent 2018 with the Hickory Crawdads of the Single–A South Atlantic League, where he slashed .289/.344/.446 in 332 at bats with eight home runs, 42 RBIs, and 32 stolen bases in 39 attempts.

Thompson was ranked as the #48 overall prospect in baseball by Baseball Prospectus in their preseason 2019 Top 101 list. He was ranked as the #108 overall prospect in baseball by Fangraphs in their preseason 2019 Top 130 list.

Thompson was assigned to the Down East Wood Ducks of the High–A Carolina League for the 2019 season. He was placed on the injured list on April 17, after suffering a fractured hamate bone in his left hand. He finished an injury-marred season hitting .178/.261/.312/.573 in 202 at bats with five home runs and 21 RBIs and 12 steals in 15 attempts in 57 games. Thompson played in the Arizona Fall League for the Surprise Saguaros following the 2019 season, and was named a Fall League All-Star.

Thompson did not play in 2020 due to the cancellation of the Minor League Baseball season due to the COVID-19 pandemic. Thompson spent the 2021 season with the Frisco RoughRiders of the Double-A Central, hitting .275/.325/.483 in 429 at bats with 16 home runs, 52 RBIs, and 25 stolen bases in 33 attempts. He was named the co-winner of the Rangers' 2021 True Ranger Award, along with Keyber Rodriguez. Thompson opened the 2022 season with the Round Rock Express of the Triple-A Pacific Coast League, hitting .304/.355/.474 in 346 at bats with 13 home runs, 48 RBIs, and 49 stolen bases (a Round Rock record, and second in the PCL) in 52 attempts over 80 games.

On August 4, 2022, Texas selected Thompson's contract and promoted him to the active roster to make his MLB debut versus the Chicago White Sox. In his debut, Thompson recorded his first career hit, a bunt single off of Johnny Cueto. On August 30, Thompson hit his first career home run, a solo shot off of Houston Astros starter Framber Valdez. In 2022 with Texas, he batted .265/.302/.312 in 170 at bats with 18 steals in 21 attempts, and his 85.71% stolen base percentage was 8th-best in the American League, as he played primarily left field. He had the second-fastest sprint speed of all major league batters, at 30.4 feet/second.

In 37 games for Texas in 2023, Thompson batted .170/.237/.283 with 4 RBI and 4 stolen bases. On August 11, 2023, Thompson was designated for assignment following the promotion of J. P. Martínez.

=== Kansas City Royals ===
On August 13, 2023, Thompson was claimed off waivers by the Kansas City Royals. In 33 games for the Triple–A Omaha Storm Chasers, Thompson hit .259/.313/.410 with 4 home runs, 17 RBI, and 11 stolen bases.

=== Cincinnati Reds ===
On October 26, 2023, Thompson was claimed off waivers by the Cincinnati Reds, who designated him for assignment on December 28. He was then claimed by the New York Yankees on January 4, 2024 designated for assignment on January 19, and claimed by the Minnesota Twins on January 24. Thompson was designated for assignment by the Twins on February 7 following multiple waiver claims, and was then claimed again by the Reds on February 13. Thompson was optioned to the Triple–A Louisville Bats to begin the 2024 season. On March 27, Thompson was recalled from Louisville. He played in 17 games for Cincinnati, but went 2–for–18 (.111) with no home runs or RBI. On May 23, Thompson was designated for assignment by the Reds. He cleared waivers and was sent outright to the Double–A Chattanooga Lookouts on May 25. Thompson elected free agency following the season on November 4.

== Football career ==
Bubba Thompson
No. 16 – West Florida Argonauts
- Position: Quarterback
- Class: Sophomore

Personal information
- Born: June 9, 1998 (age 28); Jacksonville, Florida, U.S.
- Listed height: 6 ft 2 in (1.88 m)
- Listed weight: 190 lb (86 kg)

Career information
- High school: McGill–Toolen (Mobile, Alabama)
- College: South Alabama (2025); West Florida (2026–present)

On January 12, 2025, Thompson announced that he was retiring from baseball and was enrolling in college at the University of South Alabama where he was going to attempt to make the football team as a walk-on.

On January 14, 2026, Thompson transferred to West Florida.
