= McGill–Toolen Catholic High School =

Location
- 1501 Old Shell Road; Mobile, Alabama 36604; United States; 30°41′21″N 88°04′18″W

Information
- Former name: McGill Institute (1896-1972)
- Type: Private / Coeducational / Secondary
- Religious affiliation: Roman Catholic
- Established: 1896 (130 years ago)
- Founder: Arthur and Felix McGill
- CEEB code: 011820
- President: Blake Stein
- Principal: John Poiroux
- Grades: 9–12
- Enrollment: ~900 (2020)
- Colors: Orange and black
- Team name: Yellow Jacket
- Rival: Murphy High School
- Accreditation: Southern Association of Colleges and Schools
- Affiliation: National Catholic Educational Association
- Website: www.mcgill-toolen.org
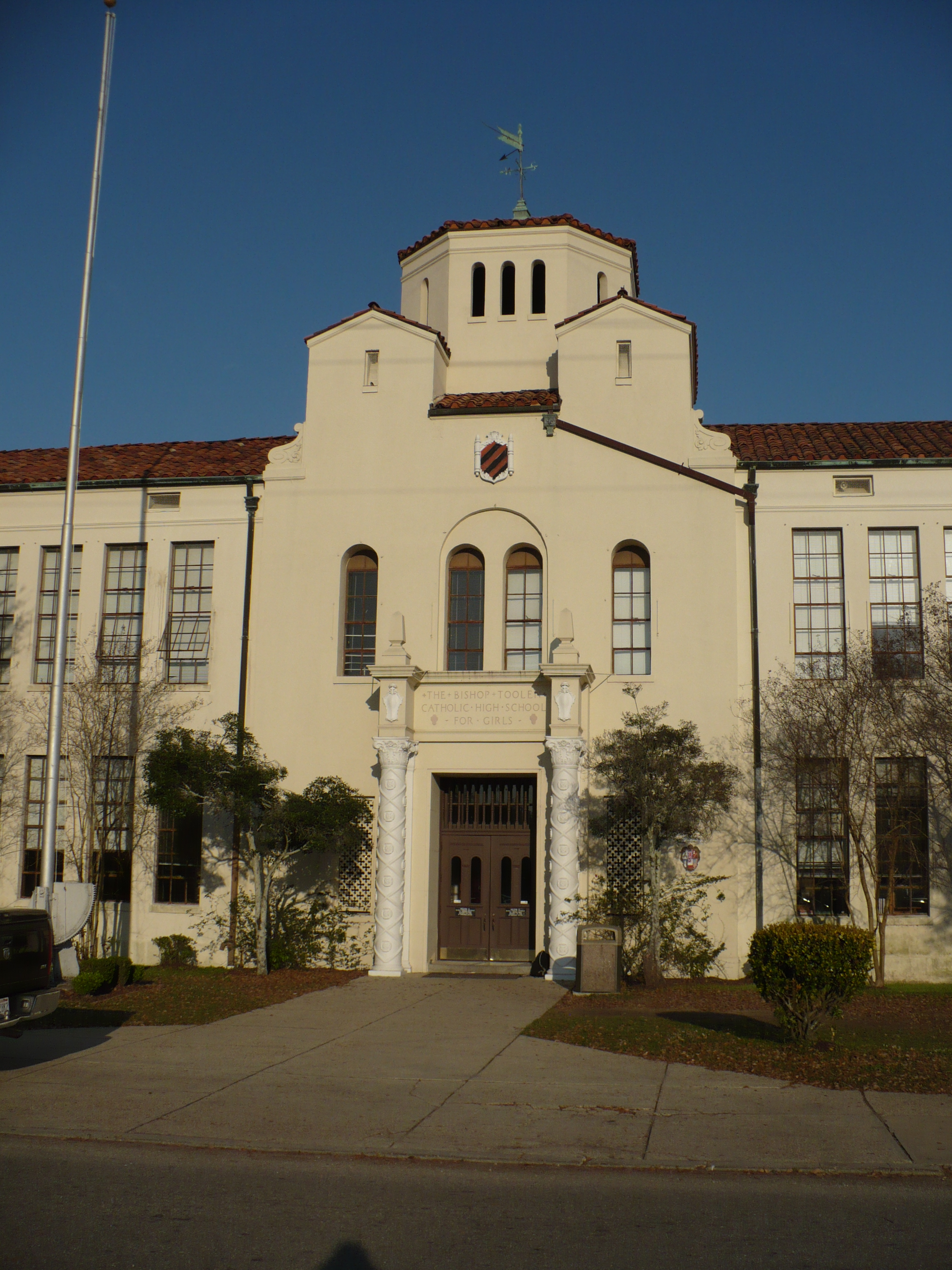

McGill–Toolen Catholic High School, founded as the McGill Institute and sometimes called "McT" for short, is a private co-educational high school operated by the educational system of the Roman Catholic Archdiocese of Mobile in Mobile, Alabama.

== History ==
McGill Institute was founded in 1896 by brothers Arthur and Felix McGill as a free school for boys. In 1928, the Brothers of the Sacred Heart took over the administration the school. They continue to serve on the faculty of the school. The original McGill Institute building was on Government Street, in downtown Mobile.

In 1952, the school moved to Old Shell Road, across the street from Bishop Toolen School for Girls. Bishop Toolen School for Girls was founded in 1928 by Bishop Thomas J. Toolen and was administered by the Sisters of Loretto until it merged with McGill Institute in 1972 to form the co-educational McGill–Toolen Catholic High School.

For much of its early history, the school was segregated, with future namesake Bishop Thomas Toolen famously refusing to admit the children of Algernon J. Cooper Sr, who later became notable figures and Notre Dame grads (Algernon J. Cooper Jr, Peggy Cooper Cafritz, and J. Gary Cooper).

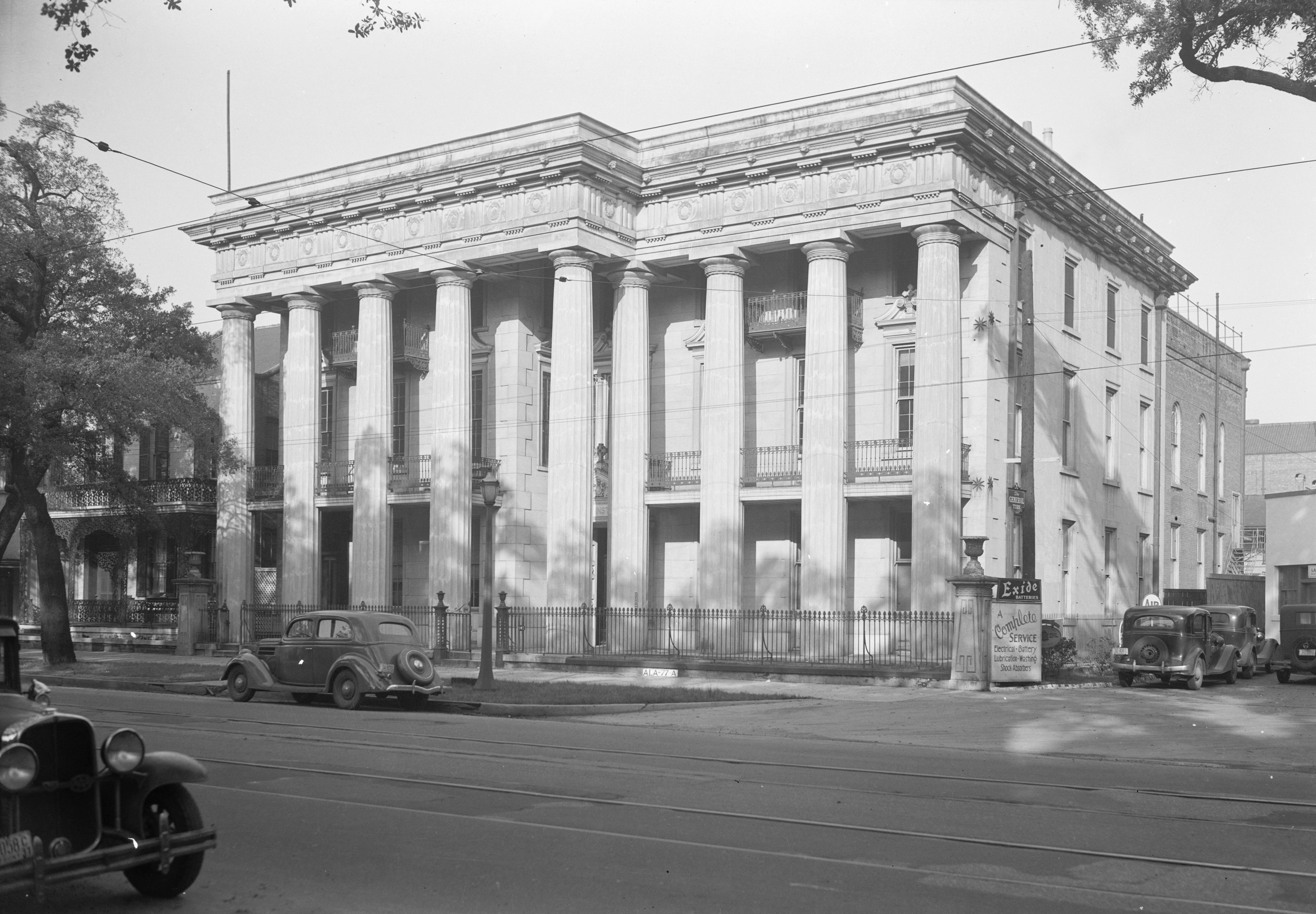
The original McGill Institute building, demolished in 1955.

In December 2007, the Mobile Register reported that supporters of the school raised $10.3 million to renovate the campus and add a new science building and student center. The science facility was opened in 2009, giving every science teacher their own classroom and lab space. The student center is a two-story building fronting Lafayette Street and includes a cafeteria, chapel, and student plaza. It was completed in 2016.

== Sports and traditions ==
McGill-Toolen's school colors are orange and black, and the mascot is a yellowjacket. In 2006, the McGill–Toolen varsity football team won the 6A Region 1 title, their first region title in 20 years by defeating its long-time rival Murphy High School. In October 2007, the school announced the construction of a football stadium at the Archbishop Lipscomb Sports Complex. The stadium was completed in time for the 2008 season, moving McGill from Ladd–Peebles Stadium. For the 2020 season, McGill-Toolen dropped drown to a 6A team.

In 2015, the McGill–Toolen Football Team became the Alabama 7A State Champions.

In 2016, the McGill–Toolen Men's Basketball Team became the Alabama 7A State Champions.

In 2019, the McGill-Toolen Baseball Team became the Alabama 7A State Champions.

In 2023, the McGill-Toolen Volleyball Team won back to back State Championships. The "Dirty Dozen" has earned a total of 23 state championships.

In 2024, the McGill-Toolen Volleyball Team "three-peated" and won back to back to back Class 6A State Championships. The "Dirty Dozen" has earned a total of 24 state championships as of now.

=== McT Band ===
Established in 1896, The McGill-Toolen High School Band is one of Alabama's oldest musical organizations. The band performs at football games, marching festivals, school pep rallies, assemblies, Mass, parades, and concert festivals, and performs several concerts throughout the school year. Making up the band program at McGill is the Marching Band, Concert Band, Jazz Ensemble, Percussion Ensemble, Color Guard, and Winter Guard.

In 2009, the band moved into their new band hall. The band room was dedicated to and named after the longtime director of the Prep Band Program Charles "Buddy" Porter.

The band is under the direction of Sean C. Noah. The McT Band has earned consistent Superior ratings in marching competitions and Superior with Distinction at Alabama Music Performance Assessment. The band has also traveled and performed in Mexico, Italy, Chicago, and Ireland.

On April 23, 2016, the McGill–Toolen Catholic High School Band traveled to New York City and made their Carnegie Hall premier.

In April 2024, the McGill–Toolen Catholic High School Band traveled and performed in Rome, Italy

On March 29, 2025 the McGill-Toolen Catholic High School Winter Guard won their first Silver Medal at GCGPC Championships.

== Notable alumni ==
- Jakorian Bennett, NFL cornerback for the Las Vegas Raiders
- Frank Bolling, Former MLB player (Detroit Tigers, Milwaukee Braves)
- Milt Bolling, Former MLB player (Boston Red Sox, Washington Senators, Detroit Tigers)
- Jimmy Buffett, singer and songwriter
- Jerry Burch, former professional football tight end for the Oakland Raiders
- Sonny Callahan, U.S. Representative for the 1st District of Alabama (1985–2003)
- Connie Simpson, celebrity nanny
- Quincy Davis (2002), naturalised citizen of Taiwan and Chinese Taipei men's national basketball team member
- Jeremiah Denton, Jr., retired U.S. Navy Admiral, U.S. Senator, and Vietnam P.O.W.
- Bill Dooley, former Head Football Coach, Virginia Tech and Wake Forest
- Vince Dooley, former Head Football Coach, University of Georgia, (1964–1988), Athletic Director (1979–2004)
- D.J. Fluker, NFL guard for the Seattle Seahawks
- Eric Garror, NFL defensive back for the Tennessee Titans
- Oscar Hugh Lipscomb, Roman Catholic Archbishop of Mobile (1980–2008)
- Dan Lord, lead singer and songwriter of the band Pain
- Jonathan Mangum, comedian and actor, announcer on Let's Make a Deal
- Jim Marshall, U.S. Representative for the 3rd District of Georgia (2003–2011)
- Carlton Martial, American football linebacker
- William Moody, better known by his ring name "Paul Bearer," professional wrestling manager
- John D. New, Medal of Honor recipient
- Eric Olen, Head Men's Basketball Coach, UC San Diego
- William H. Pryor, Jr., U.S. Court of Appeals for the Eleventh Circuit
- Ito Smith, Current Free Agent in the NFL
- Bubba Thompson, first round pick in the 2017 MLB Draft by the Texas Rangers
- Jalen Tolbert, NFL wide receiver for the Dallas Cowboys
- Marlon Williams, American football wide receiver for the Birmingham Stallions
