= West Orange High School (Florida) =

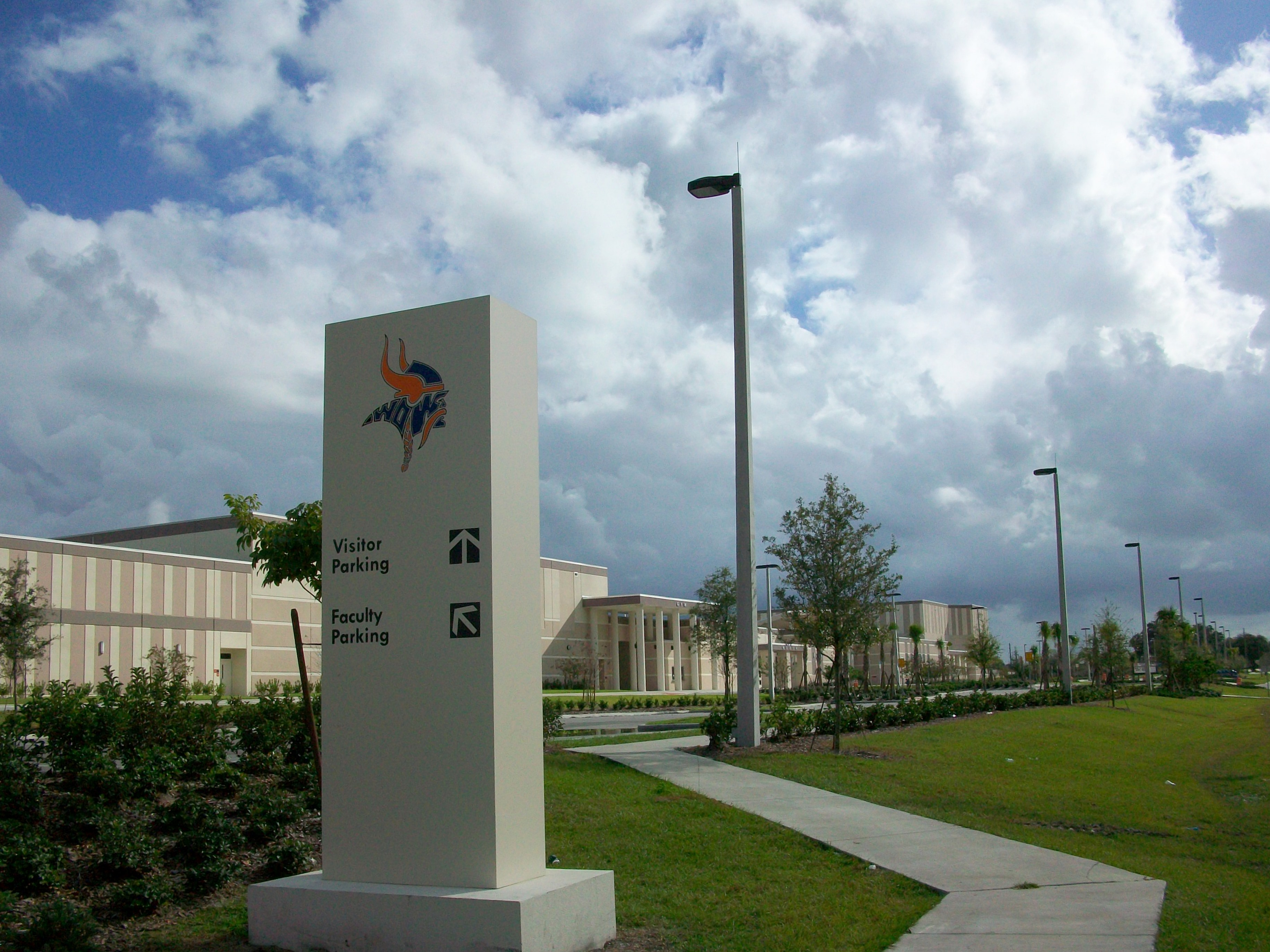

Location
- 1625 South Beulah Road, Winter Garden, FL; 28.542212°N 81.569262°W

Information
- Type: Public
- Motto: Exceeding Expectations through Academic Excellence, Together We All Succeed
- Established: 1975
- School district: Orange County Public Schools
- Principal: Andrew Jackson
- Teaching staff: 110.00 (FTE)
- Grades: 9–12
- Enrollment: 2,792 (2023-2024)
- Student to teacher ratio: 25.38
- Colors: Orange and Blue
- Mascot: Warrior (Viking)
- Website: westorangehs.ocps.net

West Orange High School is a high school located in Winter Garden in southwest Orange County, Florida, United States. West Orange serves Winter Garden, Oakland, Tildenville, and parts of Lake Butler and Ocoee.

== History ==
=== 1970s ===
Completed in 1975 at a cost of 6.5 million dollars, West Orange High was formed as a consolidation of two over-crowded high schools within western Orange County: Lakeview High School and Ocoee High School. Ocoee High School has since been rebuilt and reinstated due to overcrowding in West Orange and Apopka High School. The Lakeview High School site became Lakeview Junior High School. In recent times, Lakeview has undergone a campus expansion and renovation as Lakeview Middle School.

The first classes were held at Lakeview High School in September 1975. The first principal of the school was Lester Dabbs. Upon completion of the new facility, classes began onsite in January 1976. Many of the teachers that first year transferred from Lakeview, Ocoee, and Evans High Schools.

The original West Orange High School building design was extremely modernistic for its time. In fact, the WOHS main building was an award-winning design for the architectural firm. Apopka High School was the only school in existence with the same exact building format. West Orange appeared virtually identical to its sister school, both in the original pristine white paint scheme. The school name's facade on the side of the gym and the front entrance were trimmed in cypress wood. Gymnasium accent columns, as well as the round front entrance planters, were trimmed in red brick.

original West Orange High School gym and front entrance from 1977

All academic classrooms were housed within an innovative floor plan design, with each of the three circular wings arranged and interconnected in the shape of a triangle. New to Central Florida high schools at the time, all classrooms and common areas were located within one contiguous building complex so that the weather did not affect the school day. The lunchroom "commons," as well as the library media center and auditorium, were designed to be located centrally within the complex. The band room, gym, and industrial arts wings, as well as the science building, were located along the periphery of the complex. Designed in the aftermath of the 1973 energy crisis, the architectural design also called for a minimum of windows to maximize energy efficiency, as the building was 100% air-conditioned. Large portions of the building were also designed with removable partitions to allow for easy re-configuration as classroom size changed. Also contemporary with the 1970s, nearly all floors were carpeted and many of the interior walls were either covered with carpet or high-grade vinyl wall texturing. In the campus' final years, however, the building interior has been modified, removing most of the carpeting on the walls and floors.

The school opened with a population of nearly 1800 students for the 1975–1976 school year. As a result of the rapid growth brought on by the earlier opening of the Magic Kingdom and the more recent opening of EPCOT Center, the school was at or past maximum capacity at about 2200 students by the 1977–1978 school year. Many of the palm trees and additional landscaping elements near the front entrance portico were donated by a foundation associated with Disney. Despite uniqueness of building design, the size of the community student body was already at the bursting point. A science wing was added to the original structure, being both the first and last major addition to the school main building.

One of the school's earlier principals, Raymond Screws, was shot dead in his own office by a co-worker, assistant principal Roosevelt Holloman, who had been accused of misconduct on December 12, 1977. The football field, Raymond Screws Field, is named in his honor.

=== 2000s ===
Ocoee High School opened in 2005 and nearly half of West Orange's student body was sent to the new school, along with some West Orange teachers. Ocoee's first principal, Michael Armbruster, is both an alumnus and a former principal of West Orange.

In April 2006, WOHS held a gala to celebrate 30 years with performances by the drama and choir departments and the marching band and ensemble. The school honored six teachers and staff members who had been at the school since it first opened its doors: Pat Moran, Karen Whidden, Maxine Lee, Fred Savage (retired), Gay Annis, and Rick Stotler (retired). In 2006, additional property at the corner of Warrior and Beulah Road was purchased to expand the campus.

On October 11, 2013, for the first time on record in Orange County, two students with Down syndrome were awarded Homecoming King and Queen.

As of the 2014–2015 school year, the school's enrollment was 3,873. The racial makeup of the school was 51% White, 24% Hispanic, 16% Black, 6% Asian, 2% Multicultural, and 1% Native American.

As of the 2016–2017 school year, 4,285 students are registered for classes at West Orange.

In 2017, Windermere High School was built as a relief school for the overcrowding at West Orange.

== Original site architect ==

The original West Orange High School building was designed by architect Eoghan Newman Kelley of Sanford. His school designs include the original Lake Brantley High School, Apopka High School, and a number of high schools in Seminole County and Pasco County, Florida. He designed Lake Howell High School in Seminole County, and Land'O Lakes, Hudson High School, and Zephyrhills High School in Pasco County are among his designs.

Kelley's designs were based in part on a trend of the early 1970s called the Open School Concept. The outer school building was composed of large, simple geometric shapes with no windows, and the interior of each module was so laid out that it had few permanent walls; instead, movable walls abounded and very few of the classrooms had any doors. This was supposedly done to facilitate free movement between the rooms and other resources (such as the libraries) in each module. As the first few years were to make clear, the "no-doors" concept proved problematic, with teachers complaining constantly about noise from other rooms and halls. At Lake Brantley, eventually all the gaps were boarded up and each classroom got a door. At West Orange, the open school concept was retained to a large extent to maintain the original aesthetic vision.

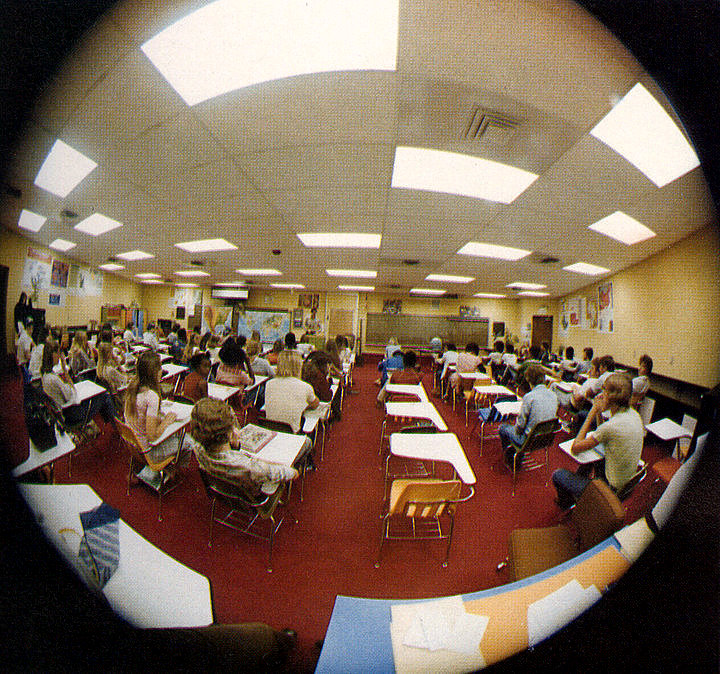
Typical classroom in 1977

Among the school designs in Orange, Seminole, and Pasco Counties, there were a number of common design themes. These almost invariably included a rectangular front entrance portico and a circular drive for easier locating of school buses during dismissal at the end of the school day. The library was often an open, sunken design located in the center of the complex. Commons areas were spacious, had high ceilings, yet were inviting through the use of carpeting on the floors and walls. Lockers were in colorful yellows, blues, and reds. The band room walls were fully carpeted to dampen sound. Support columns and recessed door openings were both architecturally functional and stylistic.

Kelley also stated that he had designed each school to be a fallout shelter if ever needed. (There was controversy as to whether these buildings were sturdy enough for this, no exterior windows notwithstanding. They contained no steel reinforcement in the outer cinder-block walls, and engineers doubt that they could have withstood a hurricane stronger than Category 2 or even a tornado, let alone a nuclear blast.) Kelley was awarded the contract to design the Educational Plaza schools and several others in Seminole County, as well as other schools in Florida, primarily in Pasco County.

Within just six years, serious flaws in construction and material quality at Lake Brantley High School began to appear, and massive roof leaks appeared in many different places. Two major repair and refurbishing projects were undertaken in 1980 and 1985, but eventually the school board had had enough, and plans were unveiled in 1996 to demolish the school and rebuild it from the ground up. By 1979, Seminole County had given up on Eoghan Kelley. By 1996, five of the 15 schools he designed in Seminole County were demolished. The other 10 have been semi-gutted and re-modeled, but the exterior of Forest City Elementary School, Altamonte Elementary School, Lake Orienta Elementary School, Winter Springs Elementary School, Sabal Point Elementary School, and a private school down the street from Lake Brantley High School (Forest Lake Academy) clearly still show their Kelley School design. Only a few fragments remain of the others: the gymnasium of Lake Howell High School, and a partial addition to the original Teague Middle School. His schools in Pasco, Flagler, Volusia, Sarasota, Columbia, and Alachua Counties are still standing. It is believed that both West Orange and Apopka High Schools were victims of the Kelley School issues.

== Academics ==
Advanced Placement courses available at West Orange High School are:

- AP Art 2-D Portfolio
- AP Art 3-D Portfolio
- AP Art History
- AP Biology
- AP Calculus AB
- AP Calculus BC
- AP Chemistry
- AP Comparative Government and Politics
- AP Computer Science Principles
- AP Computer Science A
- AP English Language
- AP English Literature
- AP Environmental Science
- AP European History
- AP Human Geography
- AP Macroeconomics
- AP Microeconomics
- AP Music Theory
- AP Physics 1
- AP Physics 2
- AP Physics C
- AP Psychology
- AP Research
- AP Seminar
- AP Spanish Language
- AP Spanish Literature
- AP Statistics
- AP United States History
- AP United States Government and Politics
- AP World History

== Extracurricular activities ==
=== Musical arts ===
==== Band ====
West Orange High School, borrowing heavily upon a program foundation at Lakeview and a smaller program at Ocoee High School, has had a 30-year band program within Orange County.

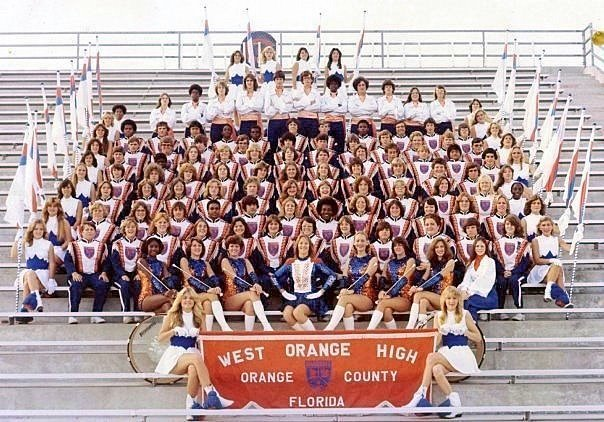
West Orange High School Band 1978

The West Orange Warrior Band has appeared at many local and national venues, including the Magic Kingdom, Camping World Stadium, the Orlando Christmas Parade, and the National Cherry Blossom Festival in Washington, D.C. On November 25, 1992, the West Orange High School Band had the honor of opening the Macy's Thanksgiving Parade. For being a shelter during the hurricane seasons during 2004, West Orange High School band was given the opportunity to march in the Hollywood Christmas Parade in 2004, and the Chicago St. Patrick's Day Parade in 2002, 2007 and 2015. On December 30, 2008, the West Orange Warrior Band participated in the 2008 Florida Citrus Bowl Parade. The event was aired nationally on ABC on New Year's Day 2009.

In 2013, the band marched in the Annual Cherry Blossom Parade in Washington D.C and again in 2023. They also marched in the 2010 and 2017 Philadelphia Thanksgiving Day Parade. In 2020, the band marched in the London's New Year's Day Parade. The band also marched in the 2025 St. Patrick's Day Parade in New York City. In addition, the band has performed at the Midwest Clinic, the College Band Directors National Association/National Band Association's Southeast Regional Conference, and the 2017 FMEA President's Conference. The band program was also recently named a Blue Ribbon Program of Excellence by the National Band Association.

==== Choir ====
The WOHS choral and theatre departments have won outstanding ratings at district and state festivals. The Advanced Choirs won 1st place, 2nd place and Outstanding Director Awards in 2005 at a competition in Verona, Italy. The choir program attended the competition again in 2019.

West Orange's choir director, Dr. Jeffery Redding, was awarded the 2019 Grammy Music Educator Award.

=== Theatre ===
The theatre department is home to Thespian Troupe 1983, and has won many awards, from a year-to-year 1st place holding in the District Thespian competition, to being named the best play in 7 states at the South Eastern Theatre Conference with Mark Medoff's play, Children of a Lesser God.

In 2017, the theatre department held the high school premiere of Steve Martin and Edie Brickell's musical, Bright Star. Under the direction of Tara Whitman, they submitted the show to the International Thespian Society's "mainstage" competition. This led to West Orange being one of eight schools invited to perform at the Florida State Thespian Festival at the Straz Center for the Performing Arts in Tampa, Florida, and one of only eleven schools in the world invited to perform at the 2018 International Thespian Festival at the Lied Center for Performing Arts in Lincoln, Nebraska. The department also had brought mainstage productions to the state festival in previous years, such as 42nd Street (2017), Annie Get Your Gun (2014), Jekyll & Hyde (2011), Hair (2010), and The Crucible (2003).

At the 2019 Florida State Thespian Festival, the theatre department received top honors for their performance of Jim Leonard Jr.'s play, The Diviners.

The department was set to attend the 2020 Florida State Thespian Festival with two shows, a mainstage production of Kander and Ebb's Curtains, and a one-act play entitled Lilies on the Land, however, the festival was cancelled due to the COVID-19 pandemic.

In the spring of 2022, the department returned to the state thespian festival in-person for the first time in three years with two shows; Pippin, a mainstage production in Carol Morsani Hall, and Ruby's Story, a one act play, for which they received top honors.

The department made history in the fall of 2022, becoming the first high school ever to perform The Prom, taking it to the state festival yet again, making it the fourth time in five years that the school would perform on the festival mainstage, this time at Howard W. Blake High School on March 16 and 17, 2023. Their production received a favorable review from BroadwayWorld as well as numerous accolades from their community.

=== AFJROTC ===
An aerospace science program (Air Force Junior Reserve Officer Training Corps) is offered at West Orange High School, with more in-depth activities available within the corps, such as Kitty Hawk Air Society, Drill Team, Rocket Club, Aim High, and an Honor Guard (which is nationally ranked for its drill team and color guard).

Their first national recognition was not until 2008–2009, when they were ranked among the top schools of the nation. In May 2013 the Honor Guard came home with multiple trophies, including a 3rd place color guard trophy. The drill team also won trophies.

== Sports ==
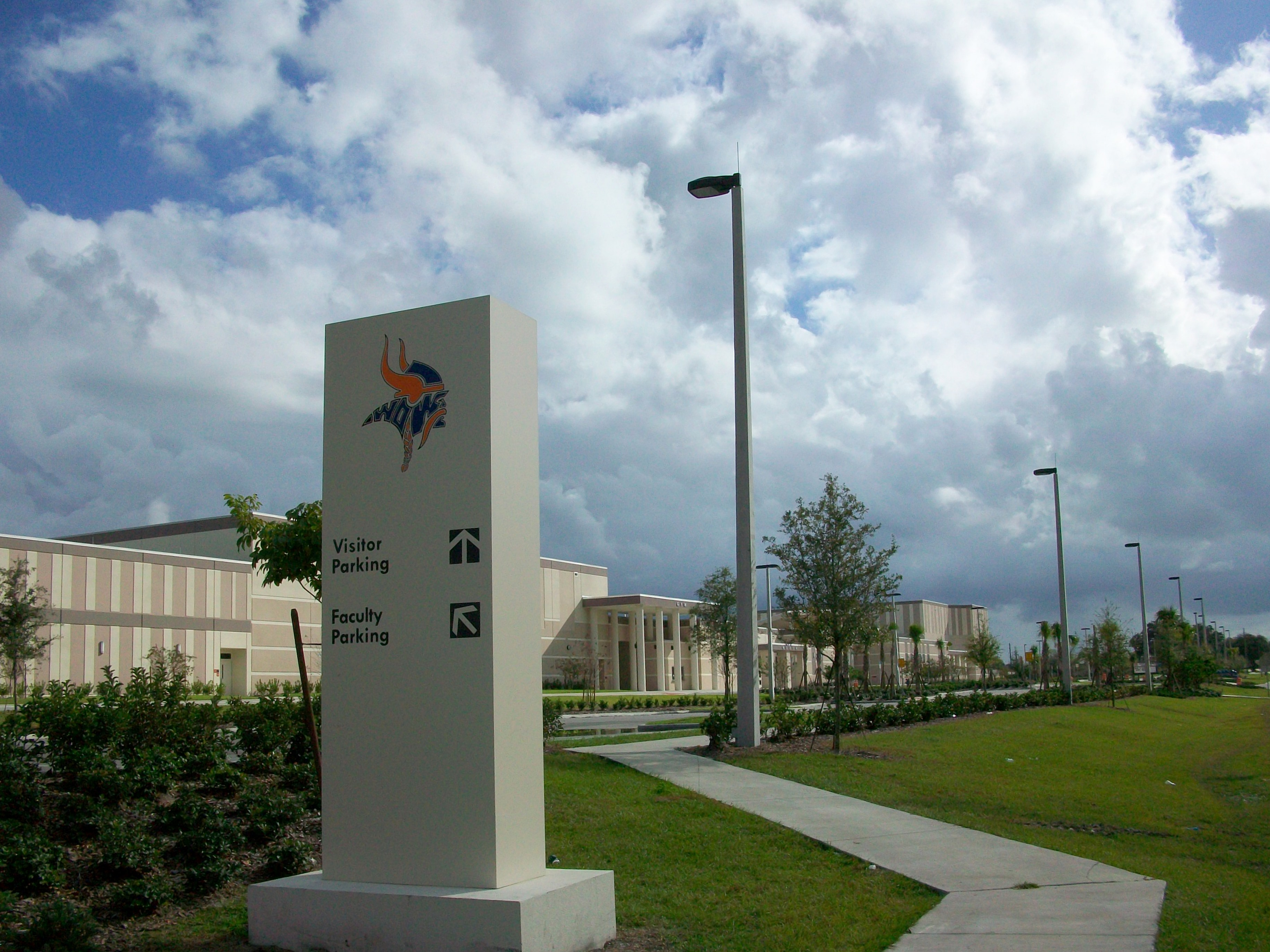
The modern day Warriors mascot logo is featured on campus signage.

West Orange sports include at least 30 teams in at least 18 different sports.

An artificial turf field was installed for football at a cost of approximately $500,000. The West Orange Foundation, Inc was established to help the school fund this and other projects. Construction for the field was completed in 2006, and lasted for 11 years. In 2015, the field was deemed unsafe due to large amounts of melted rubber and plastic. The field was eventually redone after even more extensive damage was done to it thanks to Hurricane Irma. The field reopened in late March 2018.

Starting in June 2014, the baseball facility is home to the Winter Garden Squeeze, a member of the Florida Collegiate Summer League.

== Communities served ==
Communities served by the school include: Winter Garden, Oakland, Tildenville, and sections of Lake Butler and Ocoee.

Areas served by West Orange High prior to 2017 include: additional sections of Lake Butler, the Orange County portion of Four Corners, and Bay Lake.

== Principals ==
West Orange High School's principals have included:

- Lester Dabbs (1975–1976)
- Raymond Screws (1976–1977)
- Ray Aldridge (1977–1978)
- Anthony Krapf (1978–1984)
- Joe Worsham (1984–1991)
- Sara Jane Turner (1991–1996)
- Gary Preisser (1996–2000)
- Mike Armbruster (2000–2005)
- Daniel Buckman (2005–2007)
- Edward Jones (interim 2007)
- James Larsen (2007–2013)
- Douglas Szcinski (2013–2016)
- William Floyd (2016–2019)
- Melissa Gordon (interim 2019–2020)
- Matthew Turner (2020–2025)
- Andrew Jackson (2025–Present)

== Notable alumni ==
- Kane Beatz '05, music producer
- Jaylon Carlies '20, American football linebacker
- Jordan Castell '23, football player
- Nolan Fontana '09, former MLB infielder for the Los Angeles Angels
- Stone Forsythe '16, American football offensive lineman
- Austin Gomber '11, fourth round pick in the 2014 MLB Draft by the St. Louis Cardinals,
- Doug Nikhazy ‘18, second round pick in the 2021 MLB Draft by the Cleveland Guardians
- Russell Robinson '19, track & field athlete
- Sammie '05, R&B artist
- Chris Seise '17, first round pick in the 2017 MLB Draft by the Texas Rangers
- Ivan Taylor '25, football player
- Adande Thorne '98, Trinidadian-American YouTuber and animator known for his YouTube channel sWooZie
- Dexter Williams '15, former Green Bay Packers running back
- Mason Williams '10, MLB outfielder
- Cori Yarckin '00, actress and singer
