= Roscoe Robinson (musician) =

American gospel and soul singer (1928–2026)

- Born: Roscoe Robinson; May 22, 1928; Dermott, Arkansas, U.S.
- Died: February 26, 2026 (aged 97) Birmingham, Alabama, U.S.
- Genres: Gospel, soul, rhythm and blues
- Occupations: Singer, songwriter, producer, recording executive
- Years active: 1940s–2026
- Labels: Trumpet, Peacock, Wand, Atlantic, Paula, Sound Stage 7, Jewel, Savoy, Gerri
- Formerly of: Five Blind Boys of Mississippi, Blind Boys of Alabama, Highway QC's

Roscoe Robinson (May 22, 1928 – February 26, 2026) was an American gospel and soul singer, songwriter, producer, and recording executive. Beginning his career in the gospel quartet tradition of the 1940s and 1950s, Robinson became known as a lead singer with the Five Blind Boys of Mississippi before crossing over into secular soul music during the 1960s. He was best known for the singles "That's Enough", which reached No. 62 on the Billboard Hot 100 and No. 7 on the U.S. R&B chart in 1966, and "Do It Right Now", which reached No. 40 on the U.S. R&B chart in 1967.

Robinson later became a producer and executive producer within Birmingham, Alabama's recording industry, working with Sound of Birmingham Productions and Crown Limited Records. He was twice inducted into the American Gospel Convention Quartet Hall of Honor as a member of both the Five Blind Boys of Mississippi and the Blind Boys of Alabama.

== Early life ==
Robinson was born on May 22, 1928, in Dermott, Arkansas. His father was a minister and his mother sang in church choirs. During his childhood, his family relocated to Gary, Indiana, where Robinson became involved in the gospel quartet tradition that flourished throughout the Midwest during the postwar period.

As a young singer, Robinson performed with local gospel groups associated with the Quartet Union of Indiana and later sang with numerous gospel ensembles including the Southern Sons, Fairfield Four, Royal Quartet, Kelly Brothers, Paramount Singers, and the Highway QC's.

== Career ==
=== Gospel quartet career ===
Robinson recorded as a gospel solo artist for Trumpet Records during the early 1950s. During this period, he formed a friendship with Sam Cooke through the gospel quartet circuit and briefly sang with the Highway QC's.

In 1960, Robinson joined the Five Blind Boys of Mississippi during a transitional period following the illness and death of the group's lead singer Archie Brownlee. Robinson shared lead vocal duties with Wilmer "Little Axe" Broadnax and helped sustain the group's popularity through recordings such as "Sending Up My Timber", "Lord You've Been Good to Me", and "Father I Stretch My Hand to Thee".

During his association with Sam Cooke, Robinson recommended the Womack Brothers to Cooke, resulting in their signing to Cooke's SAR Records label in 1961. Robinson also wrote "Somewhere There's A God", later adapted into the secular song "Somewhere There's A Girl", recorded by The Valentinos and by Cooke himself.

=== Soul music career ===
Robinson became part of the wave of gospel singers who successfully transitioned into secular soul music during the 1960s, bringing the emotional intensity and vocal phrasing of quartet gospel into rhythm and blues.

After founding his own Gerri Records label, reportedly financed by selling his Cadillac, Robinson released "That's Enough", which was picked up for national distribution by Wand Records. The single reached No. 62 on the Billboard Hot 100 and No. 7 on the U.S. R&B chart in 1966.

He followed with "Do It Right Now", which peaked at No. 40 on the U.S. R&B chart in 1967.

In 1969, Robinson signed with Atlantic Records and released "Ooh Wee Baby I Love You", which reached No. 42 on the Billboard Soul chart.

=== Birmingham recording industry ===
Robinson relocated to Birmingham, Alabama, in 1969 and became involved in the city's recording industry. He recorded at Fame Studios in Muscle Shoals, Sound of Birmingham Studios, Boutwell Studios, and Sound City in Shreveport, Louisiana.

During the early 1970s, Robinson worked as a producer and executive producer for Sound of Birmingham Productions, a recording company associated with Neal Hemphill, Bill Lowery, and Hal Hogens.

In the early 1980s, he continued his production work through Crown Limited Records in Birmingham, where he produced artists including David Sea.

=== Return to gospel ===
By the early 1970s, Robinson returned primarily to gospel music. He released the albums He Still Lives in Me (1973), Time to Live (1977), and High on Jesus (1983).

In 1979, Robinson joined the Blind Boys of Alabama and later co-produced the group's 1982 album I'm A Soldier in the Army of the Lord.

Robinson continued recording into his nineties. In 2014, he released God's Love Lifted Me Higher with the Birmingham Blind Boys.

== Military service ==
Robinson served in the United States Army during the Korean War era.

== Honors and legacy ==
Robinson was inducted twice into the American Gospel Convention Quartet Hall of Honor as a member of both the Five Blind Boys of Mississippi and the Blind Boys of Alabama.

He was inducted into the Arkansas Black Hall of Fame in 2019 and received a Lifetime Achievement Award from the Alabama Music Awards in 2022.

Music critics and historians have cited Robinson as one of the last major practitioners of the gospel quartet "shout singer" tradition, bridging the styles of traditional quartet gospel and Southern soul.

== Discography ==
=== Albums ===
- He Still Lives in Me (1973)
- Time to Live (1977)
- High on Jesus (1983)
- Roads and Rails (1998)
- The Gospel Stroll (2004)
- God's Love Lifted Me Higher (with the Birmingham Blind Boys) (2014)

=== Selected singles ===
- "That's Enough" (1966)
- "Do It Right Now" (1967)
- "Ooh Wee Baby I Love You" (1969)
