= Friend of a Friend (band) =

American indie rock duo

- Origin: United States
- Genres: Indie rock, dream pop, alternative rock
- Years active: 2020–present
- Label: Earth Libraries
- Members: Claire Molek; Jason Savsani
- Website: www.friendofafriendmusic.com

Friend of a Friend is an American indie rock duo composed of Claire Molek and Jason Savsani. The band has released the studio albums In Arms (2022), FACILITIES (2024), and Desire (2025).

== History ==
Friend of a Friend was formed by Claire Molek and Jason Savsani in 2020.

The duo released their debut album, In Arms, in 2022. In 2024, they released their second album, FACILITIES, which was produced by Jordan Lawlor of M83.

In 2025, the band released their third album, Desire, through Earth Libraries. The album was also produced by Lawlor.

The band and its releases have received coverage from publications including SPIN, Rolling Stone, WXPN, Under the Radar, Chicago Reader, and Stereogum.

The band has toured throughout North America and Europe.

== Discography ==
=== Studio albums ===
- In Arms (2022)
- FACILITIES (2024)
- Desire (2025)
