= Il Corral =

Coordinates: 34.083316°N 118.295116°W

- Interactive map of Il Corral
- Address: Los Angeles, California; Los Angeles; United States
- Owner: Bob Bellerue and Stane Huber
- Opened: January, 2005

Il Corral was a venue located in Los Angeles, California. that provided performance space for underground artists. It was founded by Bob Bellerue and Stane Hubert in January 2005. Bellerue ceased involvement in September 2006; Hubert and Christie Scott continued the venture until December 2007.

Il Corral provided for music and film festivals: The Turn the Screws Fest, Noisepollination, Harsh Noise v. Metal, Druid Underground Film Festival, Aloud Fest, Salient Lock-Up, The Curse of El Topo, Bent, Hollywood Nihilist Comedy Spectacular and Thee Dung Mummy; benefit shows for the Los Angeles Eco-Village, Kill-Radio and Tarantula Hill; and workshops for circuit bending and puppetry. It was a centre for L.A. director Sean Carnage's weekly Monday night event. Carnage's "Monday nights" were documented in the movie 40 Bands 80 Minutes!, filmed entirely inside the Il Corral; in March 2007, after approximately 50 shows, Sean Carnage moved his Monday night events to Pehrspace.

In addition to live recordings for CD and DVD, Il Corral hosted studio recordings for Amplified Piano Duets by Bob Bellerue & Jarrett Silberman, Snow White In Hell by KILT, Scavenger's Feast by Hive Mind, and also Corral Comp 05 for artists who had performed in the venue during 2005. Il Corral provided 215 live shows from January, 2006 until its closure in December 2007. It also served as a Bookshop and Record Store, selling cheap books on eclecticism, and music movies from the venue’s performers.

Scott and Hubert opened a similar venue, Zero-Point, south of downtown L.A.; Bellerue left Los Angeles for Brooklyn curating numerous shows around NYC and most notably the Ende Tymes Fest since 2011.

In October 2009, Il Corral was featured in Paper Cuts, a web site magazine produced by music label papercutsrecords.com.

== Bands that played at Il Corral ==
- Bastard Noise
- Bipolar Bear
- Books on Tape
- Captain Ahab
- Foot Village
- The Haters
- Health
- High Places
- Jessica Rylan
- John Wiese
- Kraig Grady
- Metalux
- Nels Cline
- Raven Chacon
- The Tuna Helpers
- Thomas Dimuzio
- Wolf Eyes
