= Male Bonding (band) =

UK musical group

- Origin: London, England
- Genres: Noise rock, noise pop, indie rock
- Years active: 2008 – 2015
- Label: Sub Pop / Paradise Vendors Inc
- Past members: Kevin Hendrick; Robin Silas Christian; John Arthur Webb
- Website: https://www.subpop.com/artists/male_bonding

Male Bonding were an English indie/noise rock band. Sub Pop released their debut album, Nothing Hurts, on 11 May 2010 and the follow-up Endless Now on 29 August 2011. The group disbanded in 2015 and posthumously self-released their final record, Headache in 2016.

== History ==
Based in London, England Male Bonding was composed of John Arthur Webb (vocals, guitar), Kevin Hendrick (vocals, bass) and Robin Christian (drums). Webb and Hendrick formerly played together in the noise rock band Pre and met Bullet Union drummer, Christian, whilst working in a record shop. Their first show was at a house party in Maidstone called "RAGE!" in May 2008. The band ran the label, Paradise Vendors Inc, and shared several cassette and 7-inch record releases before signing to the Sub Pop label in July 2009. Their first release for the label was a split 7-inch single with Dum Dum Girls titled "Pay for Me / Before It's Gone" and released on Record Store Day 2010.

Their first full-length album, Nothing Hurts, received generally positive reviews from several music sites, including The Guardian, and Pitchfork Media who placed it in their 'Best New Music' category. Brooklyn band Vivian Girls appear on the track "Worse to Come". In 2011, it was chosen for the shortlist of The Guardian's First Album awards.

During 2010 the band collaborated on a song with Rivers Cuomo of Weezer and toured with Best Coast, Dum Dum Girls, Vivian Girls, Smith Westerns and The Soft Pack.

In 2011, Rough Trade's 'For Us' labelled, released a split 7" of Nirvana covers with the band and EMA. The band recorded three BBC sessions for Marc Riley, performed at Primavera Sound and opened up for Weezer at Brixton Academy. Their second album, Endless Now was produced by John Agnello in Dreamland Recording Studios, a converted 19th-century church near Woodstock, New York. The band toured with Crystal Castles and No Age in 2012.

In 2014, Christian and Hendrick formed Primitive Parts with Sauna Youth guitarist, Lindsay Corstorphine and Trouble in Mind released a self-titled album in 2015. Hendrick has released two albums as MIDDEX, No Home (2018), In Second and Third Floor Story (2023), and, with Webb is part of Adulkt Life with former Huggy Bear singer, Chris Rowley, since 2019, two albums released, Book Of Curses (2020) and There Is No Desire (2023).

== Discography ==
=== Albums and EPs ===
- Nothing Hurts (Sub Pop, 2010)
- Covers EP (Self released, 2010)
- Nothing Remains EP (Paradise Vendors Inc / Sub Pop, 2010)
- Endless Now (Sub Pop, 2011)
- Headache (Self released, 2016)

=== Singles ===
- Male Bonding / Graffiti Island / PENS (Italian Beach Babes, 2008)
- Male Bonding / PENS (Paradise Vendors Inc, 2009)
- Male Bonding / Graffiti Island / Old Blood / Rapid Youth (Paradise Vendors Inc, 2009)
- Male Bonding / Eat Skull (Tough Love Records, 2009)
- Male Bonding / Cold Pumas (Faux Discx, 2009)
- Male Bonding / Fair Ohs / Graffiti Island / PENS - "Violent and Obscene" - a tribute to GG Allin (Italian Beach Babes, 2009)
- Male Bonding / Meth Teeth / Mazes (Split Tapes, 2009)
- Male Bonding / Fair Ohs - "Live in London 02.10.09" - (Italian Beach Babes, 2009)
- "Daytrotter" (Sub Pop, 2010)
- Dum Dum Girls / Male Bonding - "Pay for Me" / "Before it's Gone" (Sub Pop, 2010)
- EMA / Male Bonding - (For Us, 2012)

=== Compilations ===
- Rough Trade Counter Culture 09 (Rough Trade, 2009)
- PVI004 / IBB006 (Paradise Vendors Inc / Italian Beach Babes, 2009)
- Tease Torment Tantalize: A 30th Anniversary Tribute to the Smiths' Debut (Reimagine Music, 2015)
