= Vivian Girls (disambiguation) =

Vivian Girls are a Brooklyn-based indie rock group (named after the Darger characters).

Vivian Girls may also refer to:

- Vivian Girls, characters in the novel In the Realms of the Unreal by outsider artist Henry Darger
- Vivian Girls (album), the debut album by Vivian Girls
- "Vivian Girls", a track on the 2006 album Hidden World by Fucked Up
- "Vivian Girls", a track on the 2007 album Left for Dead by Wussy
