= Cry Along with the Babies =

EP by The Babies
- Released: January 10, 2012
- Recorded: 2010–2011
- Genre: Indie rock
- Length: 18:00
- Label: New Images

The Babies chronology
Live at the Smell (2011)	Cry Along with the Babies (2012)	Our House on the Hill (2012)

Professional ratings
Review scores
Source	Rating
Beats Per Minute	60%
Consequence of Sound	C−
Qro Magazine	7/10
Soundblab	5/10

Cry Along with the Babies is an EP by American rock band The Babies, released on January 10, 2012, by New Images Records. It features acoustic demos recorded in 2010 and early 2011 by Cassie Ramone and Kevin Morby in between tours and studio recording sessions. "On My Team" and "That Boy" were later included in their second album Our House on the Hill.

== Track listing ==
No.	Title	Length
1.	"Big Mercedes"	2:31
2.	"Trouble"	4:14
3.	"My Tears"	1:38
4.	"On My Team"	2:07
5.	"Hey Mama"	3:12
6.	"That Boy"	4:17

== Personnel ==
- Kevin Morby – vocals, guitar
- Cassie Ramone – vocals, guitar
