= 40 Bands 80 Minutes! =

- Directed by: Sean Carnage
- Produced by: Sean Carnage; Chris Schlarb
- Cinematography: Sean Carnage
- Edited by: Bret Berg; Sean Carnage
- Distributed by: Nail Distribution
- Release date: November 2006
- Running time: 80 minutes
- Country: United States
- Language: English

40 Bands 80 Minutes! is a 2006 American rockumentary about the Los Angeles underground music scene in 2006 directed by Sean Carnage.

In the style of Urgh! A Music War, 40 Bands 80 Minutes! is a series of punk and experimental musical performances and performance art pieces, with minimal narration. The film was conceived as a way to systematically document the music of the entire L.A. underground music scene.

On March 6, 2020, 40 Bands 80 Minutes! was reissued with remastered sound and picture.

== Development ==
All of the performances in 40 Bands 80 Minutes! were filmed on March 6, 2006, at all-ages performance space Il Corral in Hollywood, CA.

The young performers were required to play for less than two minutes, with no re-takes. The results were captured with four digital video cameras and a professional sound crew. Over 52 new bands were filmed. Forty performances are contained in the 40 Bands 80 Minutes! feature documentary. The other twelve performances are available as extras on the 40 Bands 80 Minutes! DVD which was released in late 2006 by the Long Beach, CA-based label, Sounds Are Active Films.

Among the most prominent groups are established L.A. underground bands Abe Vigoda, Anavan, Bizzart, Captain Ahab, Explogasm, Fireworks, Halloween Swim Team, Harassor, Three ( \\\ ), Health, I Heart Lung, and Toxic Loincloth. There are also solo and duo performances by members of acclaimed bands Mika Miko, Friends Forever and Child Pornography. The last performance by legendary Los Angeles band Wives is also included.

Director Sean Carnage, the movie's crew and featured performer Rob Williams (who is listed in the Guinness Book of World Records as the fastest man in the world to make a sandwich with his feet) were producers at Q Television Network, a gay and lesbian cable network which entered bankruptcy the day 40 Bands 80 Minutes! was shot.

On March 6, 2020, 40 Bands 80 Minutes! was reissued with remastered sound and picture.

== Musical performances ==
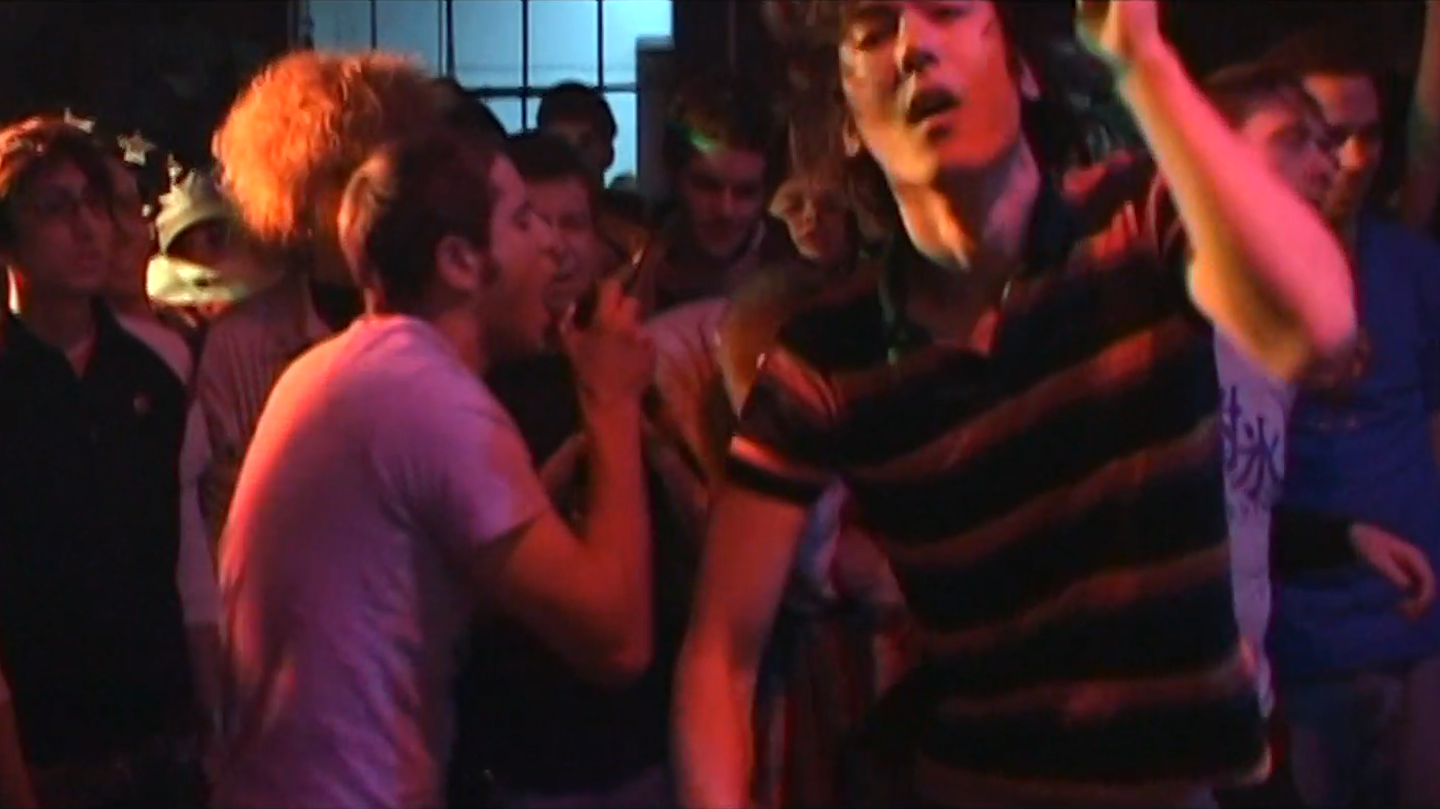
The band HEALTH in 40 Bands 80 Minutes! reissue on YouTube

- Abe Vigoda
- The Amazements
- Anavan
- Asthmatique
- Bacon Tears Up Business
- Bavab Bavab
- Bipolar Bear
- Bizzart vs. Demonslayer
- Camarillo Blues Triangle
- Captain Ahab
- William Caruso's Wet Hot Social Anxiety
- Karen Centerfold
- Christ with Braces
- Clowns & Fetuses
- Creekbird
- Debaser
- Dog Shit Taco
- Dommm
- Erebus Nyx & Styx
- Explogasm
- Extreme Dubble Bubble
- Faux for Real
- Fireworks
- Gowns
- Katherine Hall & Elijah Forrest
- Halloween Swim Team
- Harassor
- William C. Harrington
- Health
- The Health Club
- I Heart Lung
- I Rape Nick Lachey
- Lovetongueattack
- Mitchell Brown
- Naomi
- Nosaj Thing
- The Outfit
- Parkinsons
- Slutty Knuckles
- Sykora
- \\\
- Toxic Loincloth
- Unwrinkled Doctor
- Veer Right Young Pastor
- Warm Climate
- Weekend Warrior
- Rob Williams
- White Trash Firecracker
- Whitman
- Wives
- Xanaar
