= Chris Schlarb =

- Birth name: Christopher Robin Schlarb
- Born: July 10, 1977 (age 47); Long Beach, California, United States
- Occupation(s): Composer, Songwriter, Record Producer, Guitarist
- Years active: 1998-present

Chris Schlarb (born July 10, 1977) is an American composer, songwriter, record producer, and guitarist. He is best known as the founder and leader of the Psychic Temple cult.

== Career ==
In 1998, Schlarb co-founded the free improvisation ensemble Create (!).

Schlarb founded the record label Sounds Are Active in 1999. Sounds Are Active released over 50 albums and produced the Sean Carnage rockumentary 40 Bands 80 Minutes! (2006).

Schlarb's first solo album, Twilight and Ghost Stories (2007), was the result of recordings sourced from musicians across the US as well as his own home recordings of instruments, rainfall, and traffic.

National Public Radio named I Heart Lung's Interoceans (2008) one of their Top 5 Jazz Albums of 2008.

In 2009, Schlarb collaborated with Swedish video game developer Nifflas on NightSky. Schlarb composed forty tracks of original music for NightSky which was nominated for the Independent Games Festival’s Seumas McNally Grand Prize. BoingBoing described the score as “what game music can be”.

=== Psychic Temple ===
In 2010, Schlarb formed a band in Long Beach, California called Psychic Temple. The band is called a 'cult' by members, drawing from similarities Schlarb observed between bands and cults.

Psychic Temple has released 6 studio albums: Psychic Temple (2010), Psychic Temple II (2013), Psychic Temple Plays Music For Airports (2016), Psychic Temple III (2016), Psychic Temple IV (2017), and Doggie Paddlin' Thru the Cosmic Consciousness (2024).

=== BIG EGO ===
In 2016, Schlarb and wife, Adriana, opened BIG EGO Studios, a recording studio located in Long Beach, California.

In 2018, Schlarb founded BIG EGO Records, a record label that handles all physical distribution with a bi-annual shipment of select vinyl albums to BIG EGO annual series subscribers.

Schlarb has collaborated with Mike Watt (Minutemen), Sufjan Stevens, Nels Cline (Wilco), Paul Masvidal (Cynic), Mick Rossi (Philip Glass Ensemble), Dave Longstreth (The Dirty Projectors), Julianna Barwick, Dave Easley (Brian Blade Fellowship), Ikey Owens (The Mars Volta), Daedelus, Chad Taylor, Serengeti, Omid Walizadeh, Busdriver, Awol One, Diane Cluck, Steuart Liebig, Walter Kitundu, Soul-Junk, Liz Janes, Maria Elena Silva, Philip Glenn, DM Stith, and Talip Peshkepia.

== Discography ==
Studio Albums

=== As Composer ===
- Twilight and Ghost Stories (2007) (Asthmatic Kitty)
- Psychic Temple (2010) (Asthmatic Kitty)
- NightSky (2011) (Asthmatic Kitty)
- Psychic Temple II (2013) (Asthmatic Kitty)
- Making The Saint (2014) (Asthmatic Kitty)
- Dropsy (2015) (Joyful Noise Recordings)
- Psychic Temple Plays Music For Airports (2016) (Joyful Noise Recordings)
- Psychic Temple III (2016) (Asthmatic Kitty)
- Psychic Temple IV (2017) (Joyful Noise Recordings)

=== With I Heart Lung ===
- Interoceans (2008) (Asthmatic Kitty)
- Between Them A Forest Grew, Trackless and Quiet (2007) (Sounds Are Active)

=== With Create (!) ===
- A Prospect of Freedom (2006) (Sounds Are Active)
- Liz Janes & Create (!) (2005) (Asthmatic Kitty)

== Filmography ==
Film

Year	Title	Director	
Year	Title	Director	Credited as
2006	40 Bands 80 Minutes!	Sean Carnage	Producer
2009	We Scream: Voices From the Ice Cream Underground	Chris Schlarb	Director
