= Dropsy (disambiguation) =

Dropsy, more often called edema, is the increase of interstitial fluid in any organ.

Epidemic dropsy is a clinical state, characterized by edema, resulting from use of edible oils adulterated with Mexican poppy (Argemone mexicana) seed oil.

Dropsy may also refer to:

== Entertainment ==
- Dropsy (Hergé), a comic series by Hergé
- Dropsy (video game), a 2015 video game developed by Tendershoot and A Jolly Corpse

== People ==
- Dominique Dropsy (born 1951), former football goalkeeper

== Other uses ==
- Fish dropsy, a common set of symptoms among fresh-water aquarium fish
