= Sean Carnage =

American director and producer

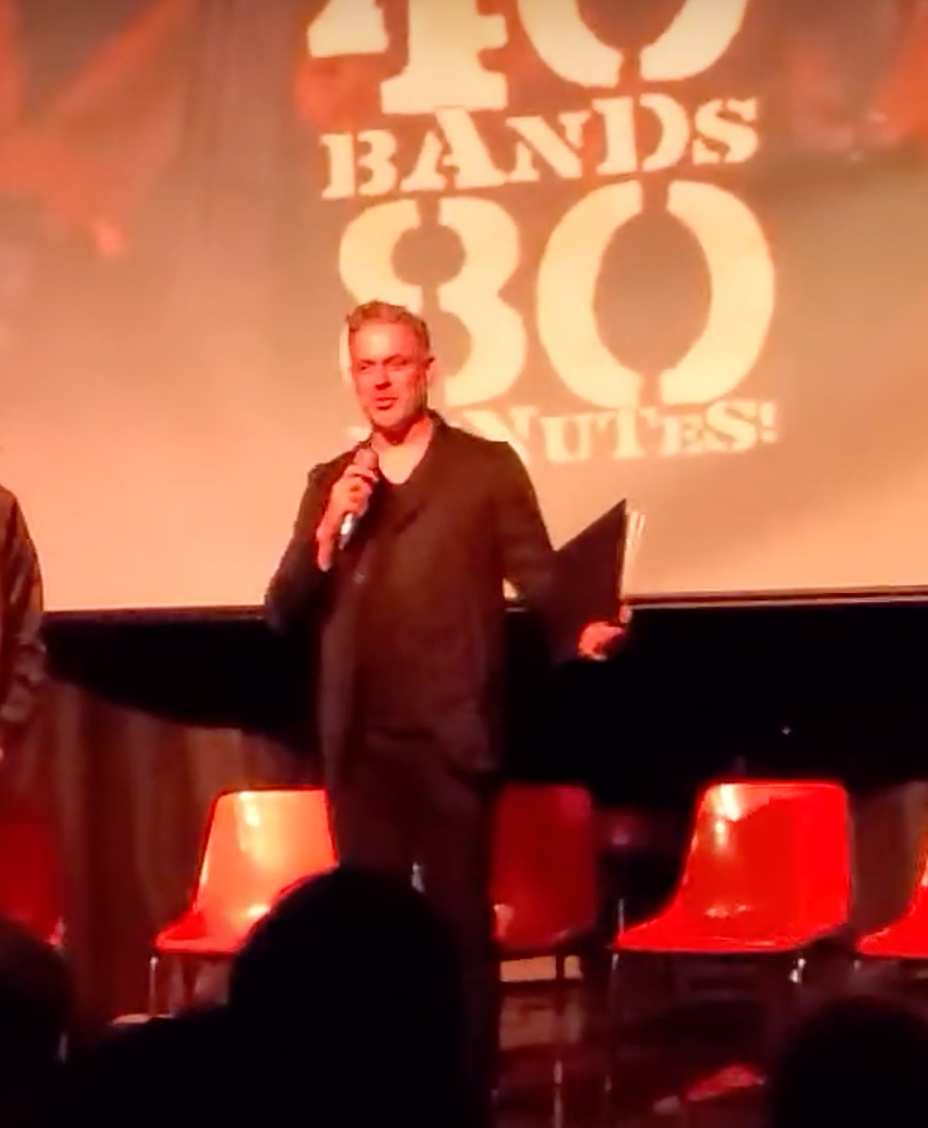
- Born: Sean Carney; Los Angeles, U.S
- Education: Case Western Reserve University; National Endowment for the Humanities
- Known for: Director; Producer; Concert promoter
- Website: www.seancarnage.com

Sean Carnage, born Sean Carney, is an American director and producer living in Los Angeles. He is also a concert promoter, hosting "Sean Carnage Monday Nights" at Pehrspace in Echo Park, Carnage has also hosted his "Monday nights" in the past at Los Angeles venues The Smell and the il Corral.

His feature-length video 40 Bands 80 Minutes! was released in 2006, and re-released in 2020.

== Early life and career ==
Sean Carney was born in Erie, Pennsylvania, and grew up in Cleveland, Ohio. He dropped out of Case Western Reserve University where he was a National Endowment for the Humanities of Art History to hang out at the Euclid Tavern and listen to underground rock groups like Craw and the Jesus Lizard. He'd played in bands, written about music, and booked shows at the funky DIY venue Speak in Tongues. He helmed local monthly music magazine U.S. Rocker for a year before it folded in late 1998. In October 2002, he headed west to Los Angeles, hoping to find work in publishing and break into TV and video. Shortly after landing in L.A., Carney responded to a newspaper ad seeking an assistant to the editorial director of a "top men's magazine."

== As a producer ==
Carney produced Queer Edge with Jack E. Jett and Sandra Bernhard at Queer Television. In 2006 Carney, as Sean Carnage produced 40 Bands 80 Minutes! a rockumentary about the Los Angeles underground music scene. Carney was also the director of the film. The sequel to 40 Bands 80 Minutes! was filmed in 2007 but never been released.

== As concert promoter ==
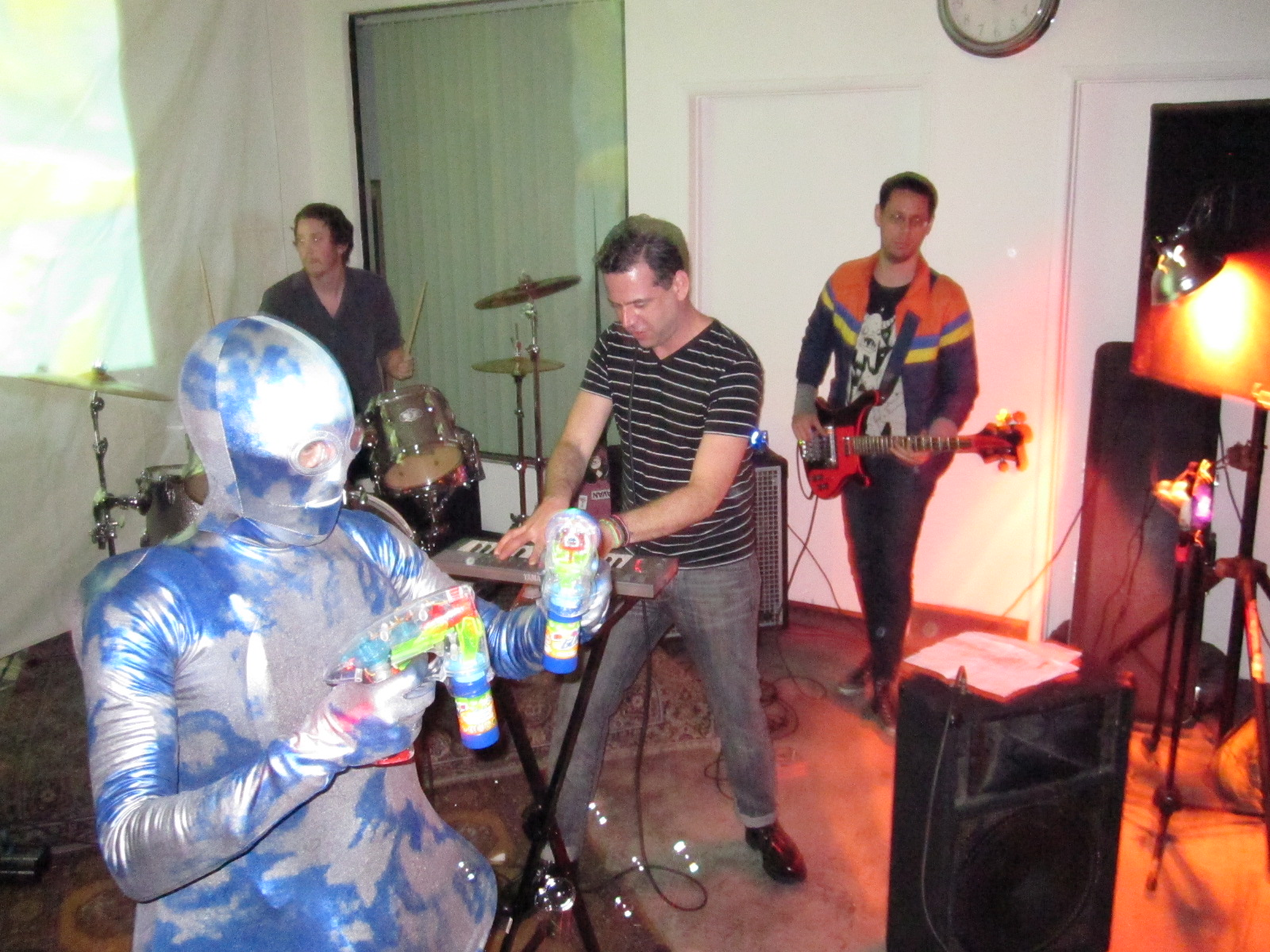
Carnage performs with his band Hawkwind cover band Cockwind at Pehrspace in Los Angeles, California, in January 2010

Carnage is notable for his weekly shows Sean Carnage Monday Nights which ran for over 500 consecutive weekly shows from 2005-2014. From 2007-2014 the shows took place at Pehrspace in Historic Filipinotown in Los Angeles. The shows known for wildly eclectic line-ups, mixing electro-punk, hardcore, noise, and acoustic sounds with Kyle Mabson's often dance-pop heavy DJ sets. Past shows have featured Abe Vigoda, Anavan, Health, and Captain Ahab. Carnage also promoted shows at Il Corral. The first show was Haircut Mountain Transit, FM Bats, Buko, Ugly Shyla, Szandora… and Jell-O shots.

== Awards ==
Carnage is a Cannes Gold Lion award-winning digital producer of Stance x Star Wars “Shop with the Force” mobile app. In 2010, L.A. Weekly named Carnage “Best Experimental-Music Promoter.”
