= The Future's Void =

Studio album by EMA
- Released: April 7, 2014
- Genre: Rock, folk-noise
- Length: 43:31
- Label: City Slang, Matador
- Producer: EMA

EMA chronology
Past Life Martyred Saints (2011)	The Future's Void (2014)	Exile in the Outer Ring (2017)

The Future's Void is the third studio album by American singer-songwriter and guitarist Erika M. Anderson (also known as EMA), former lead singer of the noise-folk band Gowns, released in Europe on April 7, 2014 on City Slang, and in the United States on April 8 on Matador Records.

The album was included in best-of-the-year year-end lists including those by Rolling Stone and The Daily Dot.

== Critical reception ==
Professional ratings
Aggregate scores
Source	Rating
AnyDecentMusic?	7.9/10
Metacritic	80/100
Review scores
Source	Rating
AllMusic	4/5 stars
The A.V. Club	B
Financial Times	5/5 stars
Mojo	4/5 stars
NME	8/10
The Observer	4/5 stars
Pitchfork	7.4/10
Q	3/5 stars
Rolling Stone	4/5 stars
Spin	8/10

In his review for Pitchfork, Mark Richardson wrote, "despite the lyrical clunkers and ill-advised production choices, The Future’s Void has the feel of a real statement, of an artist trying for something new even if she doesn’t always get there. And the EMA project is antithetical to the idea of perfection anyway, so combing through the messy whole to find the places of clarity and insight feels somehow appropriate."

In his best-albums-of-the-year write-up for The Daily Dot, critic Ramon Ramirez wrote that "(EMA) wrote the year’s best record about the Internet. . . . What stars here is her centralized, astute songwriting. EMA followed up 2011’s critically acclaimed Past Life Martyred Saints with a navel-gazing passion project, and the best thing she’s done." Rolling Stone wrote in its own best-of-the-year note that "Erika M. Anderson made the best Nineties album of 2014 (if any of us were worried about technology and surveillance taking over our lives 20 years ago). Her follow-up to 2011's awesome Past Life Martyred Saints pulses, clangs and simmers—it's unsettling one moment, soothing the next and always a smartly satisfying listen."

== Track listing ==
All tracks are written by Erika M. Anderson.

No.	Title	Length
1.	"Satellites"	4:18
2.	"So Blonde"	3:23
3.	"3Jane"	4:34
4.	"Cthulu"	5:27
5.	"Smoulder"	5:08
6.	"Neuromancer"	4:15
7.	"When She Comes"	3:39
8.	"100 Years"	5:11
9.	"Solace"	4:18
10.	"Dead Celebrity"	3:18
