= Steve Kmetko =

American entertainment journalist

- Born: Stephen James Kmetko; February 16, 1953 (age 73); Cleveland, Ohio, U.S.
- Occupations: Broadcast news anchor, Broadcast journalist; entertainment journalist
- Years active: 1976–present

Steve Kmetko (born Stephen James Kmetko; February 16, 1953) is an American broadcast and entertainment journalist. First working as a news anchor and reporter in the US Midwest, Kmetko moved to Los Angeles, California, and embarked on a 30-year career as an entertainment journalist and television news-show host.

Kmetko came out as gay in 1999, becoming one of the first prominent openly gay journalists in America.

== Early life and education ==
Kmetko was born in Cleveland, Ohio, the last of Rev. Andrew and Alice Gladys (née Newman) Kmetko's five children. Kmetko graduated from William Howard Taft High School in Chicago, Illinois, in 1970. Kmetko graduated in 1976 with a degree in broadcast journalism from Columbia College Chicago.

== Broadcast career ==
=== News reporter ===
Kmetko's first job was in Rhinelander, Wisconsin. He was watching the local news team while visiting some friends there on vacation. He called the station and insisted he could do a better job. "They sat me down in front of a camera and told me to read." A week later, the station hired him.

Later Kmetko became a weekend anchor and general-assignment reporter for NBC affiliates WAVE-TV in Louisville, Kentucky, and WOTV (now WOOD-TV) in Grand Rapids, Michigan.

=== Entertainment reporter ===
In 1982, Kmetko was hired as a general-assignment reporter by CBS-owned-and-operated station KNXT (now KCBS-TV) in Los Angeles, later moving to a four-day-a-week schedule as entertainment reporter for Channel 2 News. Kmetko said he greatly enjoyed entertainment reporting. "Fortunately for me, entertainers do not remain in Los Angeles. They film movies and attend film festivals around the world. I have had the opportunity to travel to some wonderful places." In September 1986, Kmetko was the anchor of The Rock `N Roll Evening News, a "pop music-oriented show" created and written by producer Andy Friendly for King World Productions. Kmetko also covered entertainment for CBS This Morning and hosted the syndicated entertainment program Studio 22.

=== E! News ===
In 1994, Kmetko was hired as co-anchor of the entertainment shows E! News Daily and E! News Weekend, in which he covered the Academy Awards, Golden Globes, Cannes Film Festival, and other high-profile events. He "interviewed everyone who was anyone in Hollywood". Kmetko also anchored the E! Entertainment Report, which was fed daily to NBC affiliates nationally. In 1997, "E! News Daily" expanded from a half-hour to an hour of entertainment news. E! doubled its production staff in Los Angeles and opened a satellite bureau in New York.

=== Later career ===
Kmetko hosted the National Lesbian and Gay Journalists Association's Excellence in Journalism Awards on October 4, 2005, at the Mark Taper Forum in Los Angeles. In 2006, Kmetko was hired as the anchor, producer, and writer of Q Television Network World News. In May 2007, Kmetko was hired as a general-assignment reporter for Fox 11 News on Fox-owned-and-operated station KTTV in Los Angeles. Kmetko has served as producer and reporter of several video segments on California's gay-marriage ruling for theadvocate.com, the website of the gay news magazine The Advocate.

=== Podcasting ===
Kmetko currently hosts the podcast Still Here Hollywood.

== Personal life ==
For years, Kmetko avoided discussing his private life in interviews. In 1999, however, he was interviewed by The Advocate's editor-in-chief Judy Wieder. Kmetko discussed his past closeted life and how he had decided to be open about his being gay. His reason:

"It's about what happened to Matthew Shepard. I think - as someone who has a fairly high profile and someone whom people have seen on TV for more than 20 years now - by making this simple statement, maybe people will think twice about other gay people they encounter. Hopefully they'll look at me and say, 'Well, he's succeeded and he's got a pretty good life and he's not out to hurt anybody".

When asked about the process of "coming out", Kmetko said:

"People talk about coming out, but I just don't think there is such a thing. I think it's a process that takes many, many years and takes many forms for different people. Today, thank God, for a younger generation of gay people, it's much easier than it was–and is–for me."

== Acting ==
Kmetko is also an actor, known for Jay and Silent Bob Strike Back (2001), Zoolander (2001), and Dave (1993).

== Awards ==
- 1988 Los Angeles Press Club Award for Best Entertainment Reporting
