= Exile in the Outer Ring =

Studio album by EMA
- Released: August 25, 2017
- Length: 41:04
- Label: City Slang

EMA chronology
The Future's Void (2014)	Exile in the Outer Ring (2017)

Exile in the Outer Ring is the fourth studio album by American musician Erika M. Anderson (also known as EMA). It was released on August 25, 2017, under City Slang.

== Reception ==
Professional ratings
Aggregate scores
Source	Rating
AnyDecentMusic?	7.6/10
Metacritic	80/100
Review scores
Source	Rating
AllMusic	4.5/5 stars
The A.V. Club	B+
Exclaim!	8/10
Financial Times	5/5 stars
Mojo	3/5 stars
Pitchfork	8.0/10
Record Collector	4/5 stars
Rolling Stone	3.5/5 stars
The Skinny	4/5 stars
Uncut	7/10

=== Accolades ===
Publication	Accolade	Rank	Ref.
Drowned in Sound	Top 100 Albums of 2017	3	
God is in the T.V.	Top 50 Albums of 2017	11	
Thrillist	Top 40 Albums of 2017	18	
Under the Radar	Top 100 Albums of 2017	99	

== Track listing ==
No.	Title	Length
1.	"7 Years"	4:07
2.	"Breathalyzer"	6:20
3.	"I Wanna Destroy"	3:07
4.	"Blood and Chalk"	3:16
5.	"Down and Out"	3:36
6.	"Fire Water Air LSD"	3:48
7.	"Aryan Nation"	2:52
8.	"33 Nihilistic and Female"	3:26
9.	"Receive Love"	3:19
10.	"Always Bleeds"	5:20
11.	"Where the Darkness Began"	1:53
