= The Babies =

American rock band

- Origin: New York City, New York, USA
- Genres: Indie rock, garage rock, lo-fi
- Years active: 2009–2014, 2024
- Past members: Kevin Morby; Cassie Ramone; Nathanael Stark; Justin Sullivan; Brian Schleyer

The Babies is an American rock band from Brooklyn, New York City.

== History ==
In 2008, Kevin Morby of Woods and Cassie Ramone of the Vivian Girls shared a small apartment in Clinton Hill, Brooklyn for a few months and wrote some songs. After meeting again in a house party, the two decided to start a band. The idea was to recapture the early, stress-free days of playing music before they were both in groups that had gained some success and created accompanying pressures. Despite the intention, nothing much came of the idea until the next winter when both bands again had a break. Justin Sullivan, who had played with Ramone in Bossy, began practicing with them on drums, and The Babies debuted as a three-piece in March 2009 at Dead Herring, their friends’ loft in Brooklyn. They played a few times before asking Nathanial Stark, formerly of Bent Outta Shape, to join on bass, and the full lineup’s first shows were in that summer.

The band released self-made tapes and singles for the small Wild World and Make a Mess labels before releasing their self-titled debut album for Shrimper in February 2011. They toured for much of the year, eventually replacing Stark with new bassist, Brian Schleyer. In early 2012, they left their Brooklyn home to record their second album in Los Angeles. Our House on the Hill was released on Woodsist late in the year.

In 2014, Cassie Ramone stated that the band was going to be "largely inactive" due to her focus on her own, as well as Morby's, solo careers.

In 2024, The Babies reunited for four shows, with the first two at the Teragram Ballroom in Los Angeles on September 18 & 19, and the other two in New York at Elsewhere on September 23 and at Warsaw on September 24th.

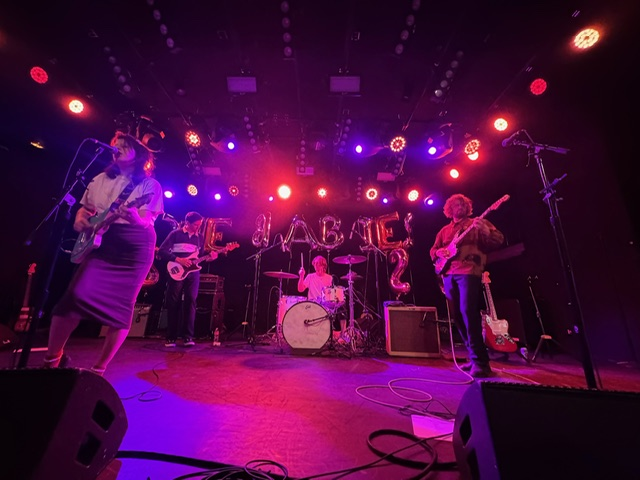
Babies Reunion Teragram Ballroom 2024

== Discography ==
=== Studio albums ===
Title	Album details
The Babies	Released: February 14, 2011; Label: Shrimper; Formats: CD, LP, MC, Digital download
Our House on the Hill	Released: November 13, 2012; Label: Woodsist; Formats: CD, LP, MC, digital download

=== Live albums ===
Title	Album details
Live at the Smell	Released: October 25, 2011; Label: Kill/Hurt; Formats: MC, digital download

=== Extended plays ===
Title	Album details
Cry Along with the Babies	Released: January 10, 2012; Label: New Images; Formats: LP, digital download

=== Mixtapes ===
Title	Album details
Tour Tape	Released: 2010; Label: self-released; Formats: MC
Tour Tape 2	Released: 2010; Label: self-released; Formats: MC

=== Singles ===
Title	Year	Album
"All Things Come To Pass"	2010	The Babies
"Meet Me in the City"	2010	The Babies
"The Wilds"	2011	The Babies
"Here Comes Trouble"	2011	—N/a
"My Name"	2012	—N/a
"Moonlight Mile"	2012	Our House on the Hill
"Got Old"/"All I Know"	2015	Our House on the Hill Outtakes 7"

=== Music videos ===
Title	Year	Director
"Baby"	2012	Timothy Fiore
"Mess Me Around"	2013	Scott Jacobson

== Band members ==
Current members

- Kevin Morby – vocals, guitar (2009–2014, 2024)
- Cassie Ramone – vocals, guitar (2009–2014, 2024)
- Brian Schleyer – bass (2012–2014, 2024)
- Justin Sullivan – drums (2009–2014, 2024)

Former members

- Nathanael Stark – bass (2009–2011)

Timeline
