= Everything Goes Wrong (album) =

Studio album by Vivian Girls
- Released: September 8, 2009
- Recorded: March 9–16, 2009
- Studio: The Distillery (Costa Mesa, California)
- Genre: Indie rock; lo-fi; noise pop; punk rock
- Length: 36:01
- Label: In the Red

Vivian Girls chronology
Vivian Girls (2008)	Everything Goes Wrong (2009)	Share the Joy (2011)

Everything Goes Wrong is the second studio album by American indie rock band Vivian Girls. It was released on September 8, 2009, by In the Red Records.

In 2019, Everything Goes Wrong was reissued by Polyvinyl Record Co., alongside Vivian Girls' 2008 self-titled debut album.

== Critical reception ==
Professional ratings
Aggregate scores
Source	Rating
AnyDecentMusic?	6.4/10
Metacritic	66/100
Review scores
Source	Rating
AllMusic	3.5/5 stars
The A.V. Club	C
The Guardian	4/5 stars
Los Angeles Times	3.5/4 stars
Mojo	4/5 stars
NME	8/10
Pitchfork	7.8/10
Rolling Stone	3.5/5 stars
Spin	8/10
Uncut	4/5 stars

Everything Goes Wrong was listed as the 54th best album of 2009 by Rough Trade. Artrocker ranked it as the year's 61st best album.

== Track listing ==
All tracks are written by Vivian Girls (Katy Goodman, Ali Koehler and Cassie Ramone).

No.	Title	Length
1.	"Walking Alone at Night"	1:41
2.	"I Have No Fun"	1:27
3.	"Can't Get Over You"	3:36
4.	"The Desert"	2:42
5.	"Tension"	2:30
6.	"Survival"	2:30
7.	"The End"	3:15
8.	"When I'm Gone"	3:29
9.	"Out for the Sun"	4:13
10.	"I'm Not Asleep"	2:01
11.	"Double Vision"	4:20
12.	"You're My Guy"	1:54
13.	"Before I Start to Cry"	2:23
Total length:		36:01

Japanese edition bonus track
No.	Title	Length
14.	"I'll Return"	3:39
Total length:		39:40

== Personnel ==
Credits are adapted from the album's liner notes.

Vivian Girls

- Katy "Kickball Katy" Goodman
- Ali Koehler
- Cassie Ramone

Additional personnel

- Mike McHugh – mixing, recording

== Charts ==
Chart (2009)	Peak position
US Heatseekers Albums (Billboard)	31
