= Live at the Smell =

Live album by The Babies
- Released: October 25, 2011
- Recorded: January 2011 at The Smell in Los Angeles, California
- Genre: Garage rock, lo-fi, indie rock
- Label: Kill/Hurt

The Babies chronology
The Babies (2011)	Live at the Smell (2011)	Cry Along with the Babies (2012)

Live at the Smell is a live album by American rock band, The Babies. The album was released as a limited edition with only 100 copies pressed. It was produced by Kill/Hurt Records and released on a blue C40 cassette, featuring artwork by Cali DeWitt of Teenage Teardrops.

== Reception ==
"Now since I was at this show, and know how great it was, I won't go on and say how incredibly much I hate the Smell, which by the way, DOES smell, and say how fantastic this version of Breaking The Law is. Much more fast paced than on record, the Babies make this song into the most crazy, catchy singalong song that is as ramshackle as it is infectious." – Nu Rave Brain Wave

== Track list ==
No.	Title	Length
1.	"Run Me Over"
2.	"Sunset"
3.	"Baby"
4.	"Breakin' the Law"	2:33
5.	"Sick Kid"
6.	"Wild II"
7.	"All Things Come to Pass"
8.	"Meet Me in the City"
9.	"Places"	2:11
10.	"Personality"
11.	"Caroline"
12.	"Wandering"

== Personnel ==
The Babies

- Kevin Morby – vocals, guitar
- Cassie Ramone – vocals, guitar
- Justin Sullivan – drums
- Nathanael Stark – bass

Production and artwork

- Chris Jahnle – engineer
- Kat Bee – engineer
- Cali DeWitt – artwork
