= Nothing Hurts =

Studio album by Male Bonding
- Released: May 11, 2010
- Recorded: Fall of 2009
- Genres: Indie rock, noise pop, punk rock
- Label: Sub Pop

Professional ratings
Aggregate scores
Source	Rating
Metacritic	77/100
Review scores
Source	Rating
AllMusic	4/5 stars
The A.V. Club	(B)
BBC	(positive)
Consequence of Sound	2.5/5 stars
Drowned in Sound	(9/10)
The Guardian	4/5 stars
NME	(8/10)
One Thirty BPM	(65%)
The Phoenix	3/4 stars
Pitchfork	(8.5/10)
PopMatters	(8/10)
The Skinny	4/5 stars
Slant Magazine	4/5 stars
Tiny Mix Tapes	4/5 marks

Nothing Hurts is the debut album by noise-pop band Male Bonding. It placed number 72 in NME magazine's 75 best albums of 2010.

== Track listing ==
1. "Year's Not Long" – 2:34
2. "All Things This Way" – 1:28
3. "Your Contact" – 1:44
4. "Weird Feelings" – 2:17
5. "Franklin" – 2:45
6. "Crooked Scene" – 2:23
7. "T.U.F.F." – 1:54
8. "Nothing Remains" – 1:41
9. "Nothing Used to Hurt" – 2:41
10. "Pirate Key" – 2:10
11. "Paradise Vendors" – 2:38
12. "Pumpkin" – 2:15
13. "Worse to Come (featuring Vivian Girls)" – 2:34
