= Memory (Vivian Girls album) =

Studio album by Vivian Girls
- Released: September 20, 2019
- Recorded: 2018
- Studios: Comp-ny (Glendale, California)
- Genres: Lo-fi; punk rock
- Length: 33:43
- Label: Polyvinyl
- Producer: Rob Barbato

Vivian Girls chronology
Share the Joy (2011)	Memory (2019)

Singles from Memory
- 1. "Sick" Released: July 17, 2019; 2. "Something to Do" Released: August 14, 2019

Memory is the fourth studio album by American indie rock band Vivian Girls. It was released on September 20, 2019 by Polyvinyl Record Co., and is the band's first album since their split in 2014 and subsequent reformation.

== Critical reception ==
Professional ratings
Aggregate scores
Source	Rating
AnyDecentMusic?	7.7/10
Metacritic	81/100
Review scores
Source	Rating
AllMusic	4/5 stars
Consequence	B
DIY	4/5 stars
The Line of Best Fit	7/10
Paste	7.3/10
Pitchfork	7.3/10
Rolling Stone	4/5 stars
Tiny Mix Tapes	4/5
Under the Radar	8/10

Memory was met with universal acclaim from critics. At Metacritic, which assigns a weighted average rating out of 100 to reviews from mainstream publications, the album received an average score of 81, based on 12 reviews.

== Track listing ==
All tracks are written by Katy Goodman, Ali Koehler and Cassie Ramone.

Memory track listing
No.	Title	Length
1.	"Most of All"	1:58
2.	"Your Kind of Life"	2:30
3.	"Sick"	2:12
4.	"At It Again"	2:02
5.	"Lonely Girl"	4:08
6.	"Something to Do"	3:12
7.	"Sludge"	2:17
8.	"Memory"	1:57
9.	"I'm Far Away"	3:42
10.	"Mistake"	2:22
11.	"All Your Promises"	4:38
12.	"Waiting in the Car"	2:45
Total length:		33:43

== Personnel ==
Credits are adapted from the album's liner notes.

Vivian Girls

- Katy Goodman – bass, vocals
- Ali Koehler – drums, vocals
- Cassie Ramone – guitar, lead vocals

Additional personnel

- Rob Barbato – production, engineering
- Drew Fischer – mixing
- John Greenham – mastering
- Be Hussey – engineering (assistant)
- Trevor McLoughlin – engineering (assistant)

== Charts ==
Weekly chart performance for Memory
Chart (2019)	Peak position
US Heatseekers Albums (Billboard)	17
US Independent Albums (Billboard)	45
