= The Babies (album) =

Studio album by the Babies
- Released: February 14, 2011
- Recorded: 2009–2011 at Rear House Studios in New York City
- Genre: Indie rock
- Length: 28:49
- Label: Shrimper

The Babies chronology
The Babies (2011)	Live at the Smell (2011)

Professional ratings
Aggregate scores
Source	Rating
Metacritic	70/100
Review scores
Source	Rating
AllMusic	3.5/5 stars
The A.V. Club	B
Beats Per Minute	73%
Consequence of Sound	C+
Pitchfork	5.8/10
PopMatters	5/10

The Babies is the debut studio album by American indie rock band the Babies. It was released on February 14, 2011, by Shrimper Records.

== Track list ==
No.	Title	Length
1.	"Run Me Over"	2:41
2.	"Sunset"	2:42
3.	"All Things Come To Pass"	2:25
4.	"Voice Like Thunder"	1:48
5.	"Meet Me in the City"	2:48
6.	"Personality"	1:16
7.	"Breakin the Law"	2:51
8.	"Sick Kid"	2:52
9.	"Wild 1"	3:35
10.	"Wild 2"	3:06
11.	"Caroline"	2:45
Total length:		28:49

== Personnel ==
The Babies

- Kevin Morby – vocals, guitar
- Cassie Ramone – vocals, guitar, cover art
- Justin Sullivan – drums
- Nathanael Stark – bass

Production

- Jarvis Taveniere – engineer, bass (track 8), guitar and organ (tracks 9, 10)
