= Past Life Martyred Saints =

Studio album by EMA
- Released: May 10, 2011
- Genre: Indie rock; alternative rock; blues rock; noise pop; folk-noise
- Length: 37:36
- Label: Souterrain Transmissions
- Producer: EMA

EMA chronology
Little Sketches On Tape (2010)	Past Life Martyred Saints (2011)	The Future's Void (2014)

Singles from Past Life Martyred Saints
- 1. "The Grey Ship" Released: February 18, 2011; 2. "California" Released: March 24, 2011; 3. "Milkman" Released: May 11, 2011; 4. "Marked" Released: November 21, 2011

Past Life Martyred Saints is the debut studio album by American singer-songwriter and guitarist Erika M. Anderson (also known as EMA), former lead singer of the noise-folk band Gowns, released in the United States on May 10, 2011, under the relatively unknown label Souterrain Transmissions. After disbanding, Anderson began working on material for a solo act, but she endured many failed attempts to successfully record before finally receiving an offer from an independent record label. The album is noted for showcasing Anderson's vulnerability, lyrically dealing with themes of self-harm, drug use, and unsuccessful relationships.

Past Life Martyred Saints debuted to critical praise from contemporary music critics for both its emotional depth and raw pain, appearing on numerous critics' polls and year-end lists. The album yielded four singles; however, each one failed to enter any charts upon release. Subsequently, the album achieved little chart success, entering solely on the Billboard Top Heatseekers chart at number twenty in the United States.

Anderson toured with other various music acts during the latter part of 2011 to promote the album.

== Background ==
Anderson played guitar for the experimental rock project Amps for Christ until the early 2000s. In 2006, she shaped the noise-folk band Gowns with The Mae Shi member and then-boyfriend Ezra Buchla. On February 5, 2010, Anderson announced the official disbandment of Gowns, which coincided with the ending of her personal relationship with Buchla. In the announcement, Anderson wrote "We were tapping into some very raw emotions, and I'm ultimately proud of the risks we took. In spite of anything else, I feel like we were honest, and I feel like we were brave." She further commented that the band members "haven't ruled out the possibility of future collaborations."

== Conception ==
"'Past Life Martyred Saints' was more like a pop record, or my best attempt at a pop record. It’s the first time I’ve ever written anything with a conventional verse-chorus-verse type of thing."
— EMA speaks to The Los Angeles Times about the musical direction of her album.

After Gowns disbanded, Anderson began putting songs together for a solo project. She took many attempts to meet with record labels about the possibility of recording an extended play, but received few responses, leading her into a depression. However, before she decided to return from West Oakland to her parents' basement in South Dakota, she received a contract offer from indie label Souterrain Transmissions to release a solo album.

Most of the songs from the record were conceived prior to the dissolving of Gowns. The songs "Marked" and "Butterfly Knife" were written while Gowns was still touring and were thus the first to be completed for the album. While Buchla was touring with The Mae Shi, Anderson taught herself how to use Pro Tools to record music. She recalled being in a "hallucinatory state" when writing "Marked" and completed the recording for it in a single take. Her Nordic ancestry inspired the creation of "Grey Ship", and the last song she recorded for the record was "Red Star", which featured vocals from her sister. Buchla sent Anderson an email following their break-up, encouraging her to release any material she had created. The title of the record was derived from Anderson's ex-boyfriend's brother, who jokingly held a belief that he was a martyred saint in a past life.

== Music ==
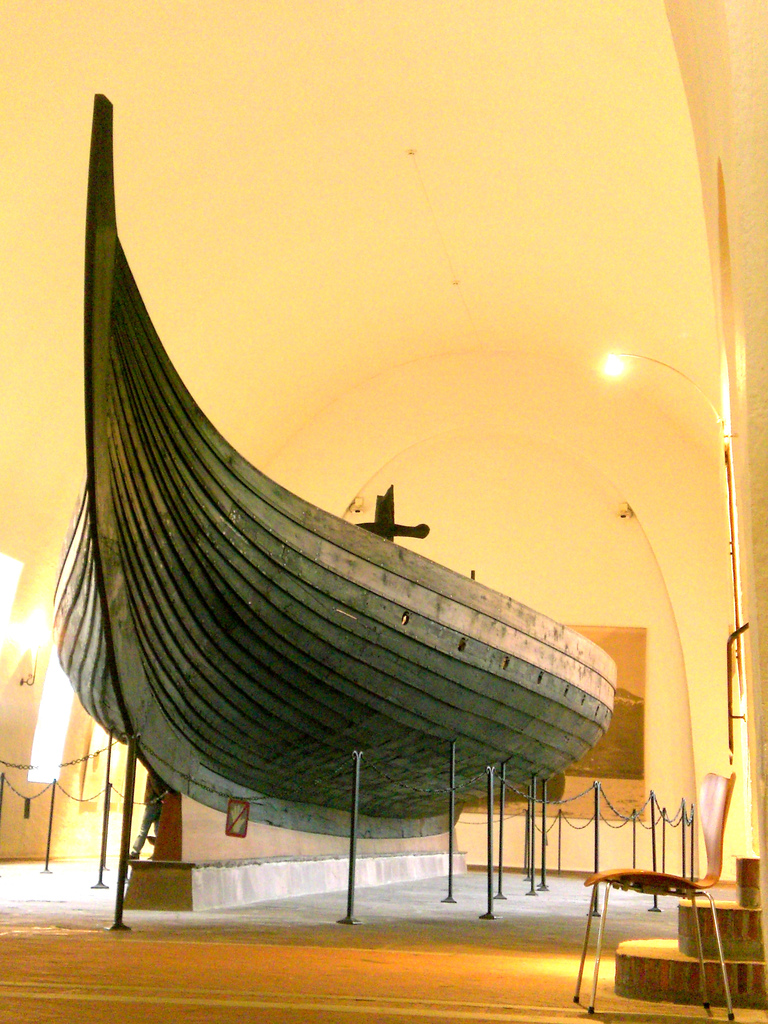
"The Grey Ship", which involves the death rituals performed on Viking vessels, was inspired by Anderson's Nordic ancestry.

=== Style and lyrics ===
In an interview with The Village Voice, Anderson cited rock musician Lou Reed as the model for her songwriting style on Past Life Martyred Saints. J. Edward Keyes of Rolling Stone attributes the "wintry layers of sound and startling left turns" in the album to Anderson developing her lyrical technique while simultaneously editing avant-garde videos. Some professional music critics have classified the record as being primarily folk-noise, while also containing notable rock elements. Many songs on the album contain moments of Anderson gasping for air between lyrics, which Ad Mehta from the online publication One Thirty BPM described as being "intimate, dramatic, and potent."

=== Songs ===
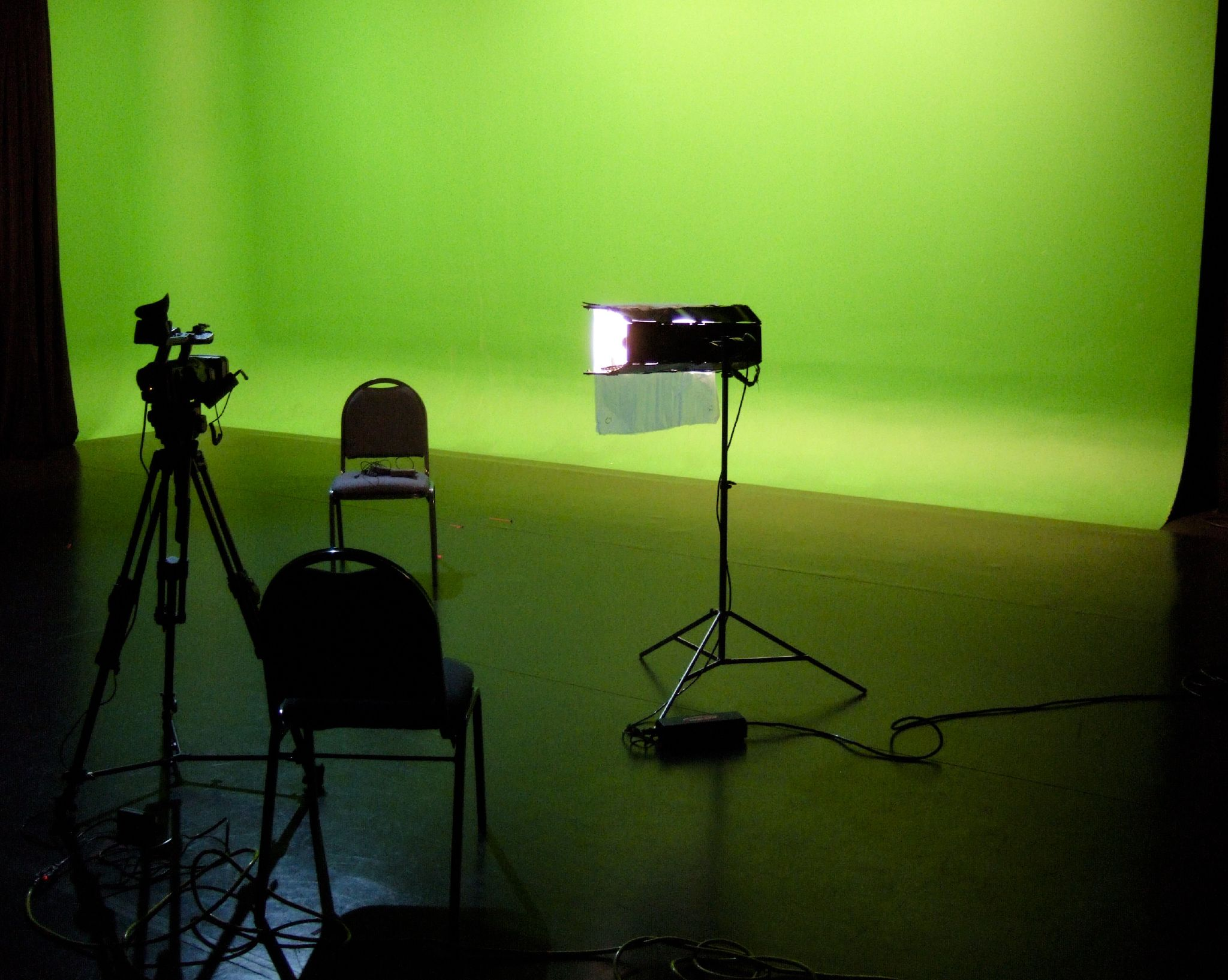
The filming technique "color keying", or "greenscreen", was prominently used in the production of the videos for "California" and "Milkman".

"The Grey Ship", the record's opening track, was chosen as the lead single and was released on February 18, 2011. Over its length, the song shifts in style several times, containing both a folk-influenced introduction and a midsection devoid of musical instrumentation. When explaining the composition of the song, Anderson stated "I wanted ‘Grey Ship’ to change fidelity in the middle of the song. I imagined it being like when Dorothy opens the door to Oz and the whole world turns from black and white to technicolour." The song received positive reviews from the media, with one reviewer referring to it as "A slow burning, seven-minute track, filled with eerie harmonies, slide-guitar, and arrhythmic percussion," where "Anderson tests the limits of sorrow—and finds glory in the gloom."

The second track from the album, and the second single released, was "California", a song which contains themes of alienation and displacement. It was lauded by critics and noted by some as its highlight track. Luke Winkie from musicOMH commended the song for its lyricism, calling it "a brooding, broken anthem for the strung-out hearts of the world" in which "Anderson unravels line after line of crushing imagery." It featured a simplistic music video, with Anderson standing in front of a screen that juxtaposed images of both violence and beauty. "Milkman", the fourth track, was the final single released from the record. It was accompanied by a music video featuring Anderson green screen-ed into various collages, which David Bevan from Pitchfork described as being "psychedelic" and "video game-like".

"Coda', the fifth track, is a blues-influenced song that lyrically deals with romantic obsession. The sixth track, "Marked", was released as a single on November 21, 2011. According to critic Nick Neyland, the song involves physical abuse. It features both raspy vocals and repetition, which some critics felt heightened the song's themes of fragility and desperation. "Butterfly Knife", the eighth track, has been noted as being more direct rock when compared to other songs on the album. The song lyrically deals with self-mutilation and was inspired by Anderson's own youth. It received very positive reviews from critics, with Paul Schrodt from Slant Magazine referring to it as one of the record's best moments.

== Track listing ==
All songs written and composed by Anderson.

No.	Title	Length
1.	"The Grey Ship"	7:14
2.	"California"	4:35
3.	"Anteroom"	3:18
4.	"Milkman"	3:20
5.	"Coda"	1:00
6.	"Marked"	4:20
7.	"Breakfast"	3:22
8.	"Butterfly Knife"	3:52
9.	"Red Star"	6:35

== Reception ==
=== Commercial performance ===
Past Life Martyred Saints failed to debut on any charts; however, a couple of weeks after its release, it entered and peaked at number twenty on the US Billboard Top Heatseekers chart. It spent a total of two weeks on the chart.

=== Critical response ===
Professional ratings
Aggregate scores
Source	Rating
AnyDecentMusic?	7.7/10
Metacritic	82/100
Review scores
Source	Rating
AllMusic	4/5 stars
The A.V. Club	B+
The Boston Phoenix	3.5/4 stars
The Independent	3/5 stars
The Irish Times	4/5 stars
Mojo	4/5 stars
MSN Music (Expert Witness)	B+
NME	8/10
Pitchfork	8.5/10
Uncut	4/5 stars

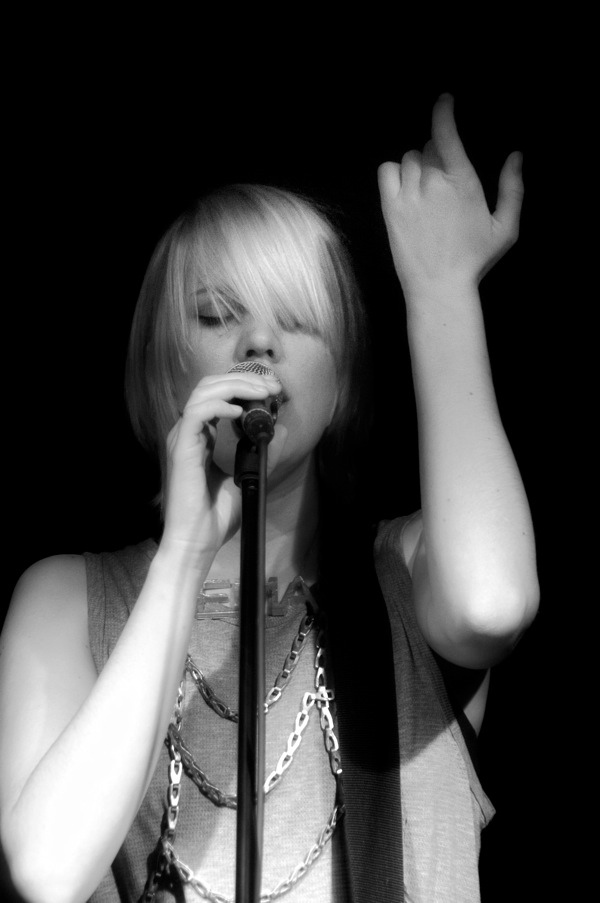
Anderson (pictured) was widely lauded for her emotional vulnerability.

Past Life Martyred Saints received general acclaim from professional music critics upon its release. According to Metacritic, which assigns a normalized rating out of 100 to reviews from mainstream critics, the album holds a score of 82/100, indicating "Critical acclaim", based on twenty-four reviews. Heather Phares from AllMusic reserved praise for the album, feeling that it "will win Andersen new fans as well as thrill longtime ones." Priya Elan from NME also responded positively to the album, commenting that "her perceptive glare is intense and unrelenting. A new, added tunefulness makes this a much-welcome Exile In Nihilist-ville." Ian Mathers of PopMatters awarded the record a nine out of ten, feeling that "EMA's work is simultaneously some of the most interesting I've heard in years, and jaggedly alive, the furthest thing from any sort of academic exercise."

Many critics awarded praise for the album's raw and powerful emotions. James Skinner of Drowned in Sound commended the record for its feeling of "naked emotion on display." Skinner further commented on the album, stating it "certainly isn’t a unanimously easy listen (that much should be clear from its title alone), but themes like those of ‘Butterfly Knife’ are leavened by that ever-present defiance." Nick Neyland from Pitchfork lauded the album, calling it "a fiercely individual record, made by a musician with a fearless and courageous approach to her art. Crucially, the desire to let such raw emotion out in song never feels forced." Paul Schrodt of Slant Magazine observed that "Rock music is not an uncommon way to deal with pain, either for the people who make it or for those who listen to it, but it's rare when those raw emotions translate into a record as focused and accomplished as EMA's debut". Ad Mehta from One Thirty BPM gave the record high marks, stating "With fresh, sonically adventurous juxtapositions, and bold, honest lyrics, [Anderson] engages the listener in an intense, emotional journey.

Ryan Stewart from The Boston Phoenix commented that the record "is more focused and confident than the work of many of Andersen's peers. It's likely we've not even heard her best yet. And even if not, this is pretty sweet as is. Theon Weber from The Village Voice concluded that "[Anderson] has a huge talent for drama—when to build, when to break, when to whisper or coo or yell, when to camp a while in a looping melody and when to move on—and the album's 37 minutes feel majestic and unhurried." Luke Winkie of musicOMH praised Anderson for her "brilliant, visceral talent for stormy melodies and untouchable lyrical knack" and concluded that the album contained "some of the most stirring lyrical turns of the year." Laura Studarus, a writer from Under the Radar, described the album as "a skittering trip through the displaced troubadour’s disjointed existence. Rachel Harris from Clash feels that the record "will leave you bewitched and bewildered." Benjamin Boles from NOW described the album as "not always the most comfortable thing to listen to, but like the proverbial car crash, it’s hard to tear yourself away." Andrew Baer of No Ripcord found the album to be "an overall cohesive success", but he felt that the record owed its "quality to the unwavering confidence of [Anderson's] delivery, both musically and lyrically."

Despite the high amount of praise, various international publications, particularly the British music press, had mixed feelings towards the record. Andrzej Lukowski from BBC Music, praised the material, concluding that "Song for song, it’s one of the most impressive collections of the year." However, Lukowski found the record as a whole to be incoherent. Andy Gill from The Independent felt that most of the album's material didn't live up to its opening track. Andrew Perry of The Daily Telegraph lauded the record for its emotional depth, but felt that Anderson's style was similar to that of other artists. Patrik Wirén of the Swedish newspaper Metro International awarded the album three out of five stars, calling it a "primitive recording". However, Wirén concluded his review on a rather positive note, finding Anderson to be promising.

=== Accolades ===
Spin magazine included the record among thirty-three others in its mid-year list of the best albums of 2011, commenting that Anderson "unleashes everything from tinnitus-inducing, reverb-soaked guitar drones to light-as-air acoustic ditties and pseudo-industrial bangers. But it's her emotionally raw confessionals that bind these nine tracks." NME also included the record in its mid-year list.

The album was included in numerous publications' year-end lists. Dan Reilly from Spinner.com named it the best album of the year. Pitchfork included the record in its catalog of "Best New Albums", commenting that "Anderson's music has the power to plummet to the depths and drag you right down there with her," and placed the album at number 13 on its list of the "Top 50 albums of 2011", at number 38 on its list of "The 100 Best Albums Of The Decade So Far (2010-2014)" and at 111 on its list of "The 200 Best Albums of the Decade". Spin ranked the record third in its list of the "50 Best Albums of 2011", concluding that "It doesn't feel hyperbolic to suggest that someone somewhere needed to hear this music just as badly as Anderson needed to make it." Anthony Carew from About.com named it the fourth best album of 2011. Corey Beasley of PopMatters ranked the record sixth in his list of the best indie rock albums of 2011. The publication also included the record in its list of "The 75 Best Albums of 2011". BBC Music writer Mike Diver placed it at number twenty in his list of "Top 25 Albums of 2011". The Fly and Stereogum placed the album at number thirty-seven and seven respectively in their lists of "Top 50 Albums of 2011". Exclaim! included the record at number twenty-six in its compiled list of the thirty best albums of the year. Under the Radar included the record at number six in its year-end list, concluding that "Anderson positioned herself as the 50-Ft Queenie that inspires devotion not through intimidation but with an emotional candidness that feels surprisingly universal." Mojo placed the album at number twenty-four on its list of "Top 50 albums of 2011."

== Promotion ==
Leading up to its release, the record was marketed minimally. After the album's distribution, Anderson received high praise and honors from various music publications, including the annual "Artist to Watch" from Rolling Stone, which led to noteworthy buzz on blogging websites. Subsequently, news of the album's release was propelled. On July 26, Anderson announced that she would embark on a promotional tour across North America and Europe in the fall of 2011. Anderson headlined certain venues, as well as toured with alternative band Ganglians and chillwave musical project Washed Out, and opened for the rock bands CSS, MEN, and Wild Beasts on various dates.

=== Promotional tour ===
Date	City	Country	Venue
North America
September 8, 2011	Portland	United States	Holocene
Europe
September 13, 2011	Brighton	United Kingdom	Green Door Store
September 14, 2011	London	United Kingdom	Cargo
September 15, 2011	Bristol	United Kingdom	The Thekla
September 16, 2011	Manchester	United Kingdom	Centre for Deaf Studies
September 17, 2011	Leffinge	Belgium	Leffinge Festival
September 18, 2011	Tilburg	Netherlands	Incubate
September 20, 2011	Amsterdam	Netherlands	Paradiso
September 21, 2011^{[A]}	Munich	Germany	Atomic Cafe
September 22, 2011^{[B]}	Berlin	Germany	Festsaal Kreuzberg
September 23, 2011	Hamburg	Germany	Reeperbahn Festival
September 24, 2011	Cologne	Germany	Gebäude 9
September 25, 2011	Offenbach am Main	Germany	Hafen 2
September 27, 2011	Kufstein	Austria	Kulturfabrik
September 28, 2011	Vienna	Austria	Badeschiff
September 29, 2011	St. Gallen	Switzerland	Theater St. Gallen
September 30, 2011	Dudigan	Switzerland	Bad Bonn
October 1, 2011	Brussels	Belgium	Orangerie
North America
October 7, 2011^{[B]}	Seattle	United States	Neptune
October 8, 2011^{[B]}	Vancouver	Canada	Biltmore Cabaret
October 11, 2011^{[B]}	Santa Cruz	United States	Rio Theatre
October 12, 2011	San Francisco	United States	The Independent
October 13, 2011^{[B]}	Los Angeles	United States	Echoplex
October 14, 2011	San Diego	United States	The Casbah
October 15, 2011^{[C]}	Phoenix	United States	The Crescent Ballroom
October 21, 2011^{[D]}	Philadelphia	United States	Union Transfer
October 22, 2011^{[D]}	New York	United States	Webster Hall
October 23, 2011^{[D]}	Boston	United States	Paradise Rock Club
October 24, 2011^{[D]}	Washington, D.C.	United States	9:30 Club
October 26, 2011^{[D]}	Athens	United States	40 Watt Club
October 28, 2011^{[D]}	Dallas	United States	House of Blues
October 29, 2011^{[D]}	Houston	United States	House of Blues
October 30, 2011^{[D]}	Austin	United States	La Zona Rosa

Associated Acts
^{A} This concert features Anderson co-headlining with Ganglians.
^{B} These concerts feature Anderson supporting Wild Beasts.
^{C} This concert features Anderson co-headlining with Washed Out.
^{D} These concerts feature Anderson supporting CSS and MEN.

== Personnel ==
Additional performers

- Nicole K. Anderson – drums, guitar, vocals
- Ezra Buchla – keyboards, viola, vocals
- Aaron Davis – bass guitar
- Corey Fogel - percussion
- Leif Shackelford – keyboards, piano, synthesizer, viola
- Zev3 - bass guitar, tambourine

Technical

- Erika M. Anderson – composing, engineering, mixing, production
- Will Rahilly – layout
- Sarah Register – mastering
- Leif Shackelford – mixing, production

== Charts ==
Chart (2011)	Peak position
US Billboard Top Heatseekers	20

== Release history ==
Country	Date	Label
United States	May 10, 2011	Souterrain Transmissions
