= Q Television Network =

American LGBTQ+ television network

History
- Launched: September 2004; 20 years ago
- Closed: May 2006; 19 years ago

Q Television Network was a shortlived American cable television channel which aired programming targeted to the lesbian, gay, and bisexual audiences. Founded by Frank Olsen, and eventually owned by Triangle Multimedia, the cable channel aired a mix of film, documentary and music programming, along with a number of original live talk show, information and news programs.

== History ==
The channel's establishment was announced in early 2004, and began advertising in August. Its studios were based in Palm Springs, California.

It launched in September on selected cable services in major metropolitan markets, expanding in 2005 around the same time as the launch of Logo TV. Despite being based in Palm Springs, however, the city's mayor Ron Oden had to actively lobby to get the channel added to the local cable lineup.

Personalities associated with Q programming included Jack E. Jett, Jackie Enx, Rob Williams, Elizabeth Melendez, Nick Oram, Steve Kmetko, Josh Fountain, Honey Labrador, Joe Bechely, Reichen Lehmkuhl and Chrisanne Eastwood.

In 2005, Q became available in Australia via SelecTV.

In February 2006, following a missed payroll run, the channel laid off much of its staff and shuttered its production facility in Burbank. It rehired a skeleton staff on a part-time basis later in the month, but Olsen was pushed out as CEO on March 7 and replaced by Taiwanese businessman Lloyd Fan. By May, Fan announced that the channel was shutting down, and the company filed for bankruptcy on May 25.

Some of the production staff and crew reunited under the direction of Queer Edge associate producer Sean Carnage on March 6, 2006, to produce the music documentary 40 Bands 80 Minutes!.

== See also ==
- Shortbus, a 2006 American erotic comedy-drama film, produced in association with Q Television Network.
