= Erect the Youth Problem =

Studio album by Wives
- Released: 2004
- Recorded: 2004
- Genre: Hardcore punk, noise rock
- Length: 27:40
- Label: Cold Sweat Records

Professional ratings
Review scores
Source	Rating
Robert Christgau	(1-star Honorable Mention)
Drowned in Sound	10/10 stars

Erect the Youth Problem is the only studio album released by American punk trio Wives. It was released in 2004 via Cold Sweat Records.

== Track listing ==
1. "4X4" - 1:09
2. "Babies" - 1:34
3. "Mountainous" - 2:04
4. "We Came Out Like Tigers" - 1:39
5. "All Dads Alike" - 1:49
6. "Boys Club" - 4:54
7. "I've Got This One Partner" - 2:14
8. "Wasted Again, Again" - 1:36
9. "Squeeze Your Eyes So Tight" - 1:06
10. "Mother Russia" - 1:30
11. "The Big Idea" - 2:47
12. "Lunch Money" - 1:22
13. "We'd Never Assume That" - 2:00
14. "Brickface" - 2:00
