= Philip Glenn =

American violinist, pianist, and mandolinist

- Born: Philip Glenn; October 19, 1987 (age 38); Los Angeles, California, United States
- Occupations: Violinist, Pianist, Mandolinist
- Years active: 2011-Present
- Notable work: Psychic Temple III (2016), Psychic Temple IV (2017), How it All Goes Down (2017), Outsider (2018)

Philip Glenn (born October 19, 1987) is an American violinist, pianist, and mandolinist. He is best known for his work on Psychic Temple IV (2017), How it All Goes Down (2017), and Outsider (2018).

== Early life ==
Glenn was born in Los Angeles, California.

Glenn received a B.A. in Violin Performance and Music Education from Biola University. He was the 2011 Daniel Pearl Memorial Violin Recipient.

== Career ==
In 2011, Glenn joined The Show Ponies and performed on Here We Are! (2012), We're Not Lost (2013), Run For Your Life (2014), and How It All Goes Down (2017). The Show Ponies performed their last concert on March 17, 2018, at Bottom of the Hill in San Francisco, California.

In 2016, Glenn joined Psychic Temple and performed on Psychic Temple Plays Music For Airports (2016), Psychic Temple III (2016), and Psychic Temple IV (2017).

On January 12, 2018, Glenn released his debut solo album Outsider (2018) on Joyful Noise Recordings / BIG EGO Records. The album was produced by Chris Schlarb.

Glenn is a session musician for BIG EGO Studios in Long Beach, California.

== Personal life ==
Glenn is of Filipino and Scottish descent

== Discography ==
Studio Albums

=== Solo ===
- Outsider (2018) (Joyful Noise Recordings / BIG EGO Records)

=== With The Show Ponies ===
- Here We Are! (2012)
- We're Not Lost (2013)
- Run For Your Life (2014)
- How It All Goes Down (2017) (Entertainment One)

=== With Psychic Temple ===
- Psychic Temple Plays Music For Airports (2016) (Joyful Noise Recordings)
- Psychic Temple III (2016) (Asthmatic Kitty)
- Psychic Temple IV (2017) (Joyful Noise Recordings)

=== Misc. Studio Sessions ===
- Shining Stars (2010)
- Post Mortem (2011)
- Strange Rain (2011) (Erik Loyer / Opertoon)
- Dropsy (2015) (Joyful Noise Recordings)
- Call Me Back Home (2018) (Joyful Noise Recordings / BIG EGO Records)
