= Wives (band) =

- Origin: Los Angeles
- Genres: Hardcore punk, noise rock
- Years active: 2001–2005, 2006
- Labels: Cold Sweat Records; Post Present Medium
- Spinoffs: No Age
- Past members: Dean Allen Spunt; Randy Randall; Jeremy Villalobos "Roy"

Wives was an American hardcore punk/noise rock trio from Los Angeles consisting of guitarist Randy Randall, bassist/vocalist Dean Spunt, and drummer Jeremy Villalobos. In the three years the band were together, they released a self-titled 7-inch on Post Present Medium, as well as a split 7-inch with K.I.T on Post Present Medium. In September 2004 the band released their first full-length LP, Erect the Youth Problem, on Cold Sweat Records. In June 2005, the band released a split 12-inch with Moving Units, also on Post Present Medium. In November 2005, following a European tour the band split; a friend, Roy, replaced Jeremy on drums finishing the last leg of the tour with them, playing their farewell show on November 20 at the Highbury Buffalo Bar, London, England. Spunt and Randall reunited to perform the "final" Wives set for the independent film 40 Bands/80 Minutes! which was filmed on March 6, 2006, in Hollywood, CA. Randall and Spunt went on to start No Age shortly after the split while Villalobos, currently plays in Brooklyn trash rock band Pygmy Shrews and power electronics band Whip & the Body.

== Discography ==
Studio albums

Year	Title
2004	Erect the Youth Problem: Released: September 21, 2004; Label: Post Present Medium; Formats: LP, CD

Singles and EPs

Year	Title
2003	Wives: Released: 2003; Label: Post Present Medium; Formats: LP
2003	Wives / K.I.T. (split): Released: 2003; Label: Post Present Medium, Zum; Formats: LP
2005	EU/UK Tour 2005: Released: 2005; Label: Cold Sweat Records; Formats: LP
2005	Moving Units / Wives (split): Released: 2005; Label: Post Present Medium; Formats: LP
2011	Roy Tapes (posthumous release): Released: December 5, 2011; Label: Post Present Medium; Formats: LP, CD
