= The Time Has Come (Cassie Ramone album) =

Studio album by Cassie Ramone
- Released: August 26, 2014
- Genre: Indie rock
- Length: 23:53
- Label: Loglady

Professional ratings
Review scores
Source	Rating
Pitchfork Media	6.7/10
Paste Magazine	5/10
Punknews.org	3.5/5
Boxx Magazine	3/5
Popstache	3/5

The Time Has Come is the debut studio album by American indie rock musician Cassie Ramone, released on August 26, 2014, by Loglady Records. It features Ariel Pink on bass for several tracks. A limited cassette edition was released for Cassette Store Day 2014.

== Track list ==
All songs written by Cassie Ramone.

No.	Title	Length
1.	"Song of Love"	2:27
2.	"The Time Has Come"	3:30
3.	"Joe's Song"	2:47
4.	"I'm a Freak"	2:41
5.	"Hangin On"	2:54
6.	"I Don't Really Wanna"	3:19
7.	"Sensitive Soul"	2:27
8.	"I Send My Love to You"	3:14
Total length:		23:53

== Personnel ==
Musicians

- Cassie Ramone – vocals, guitar, mixing
- Ariel Pink – bass (tracks 1, 3, 4, 5, 6)

Production

- Jay Heiselmann – mastering
