= La Sera =

US musical group

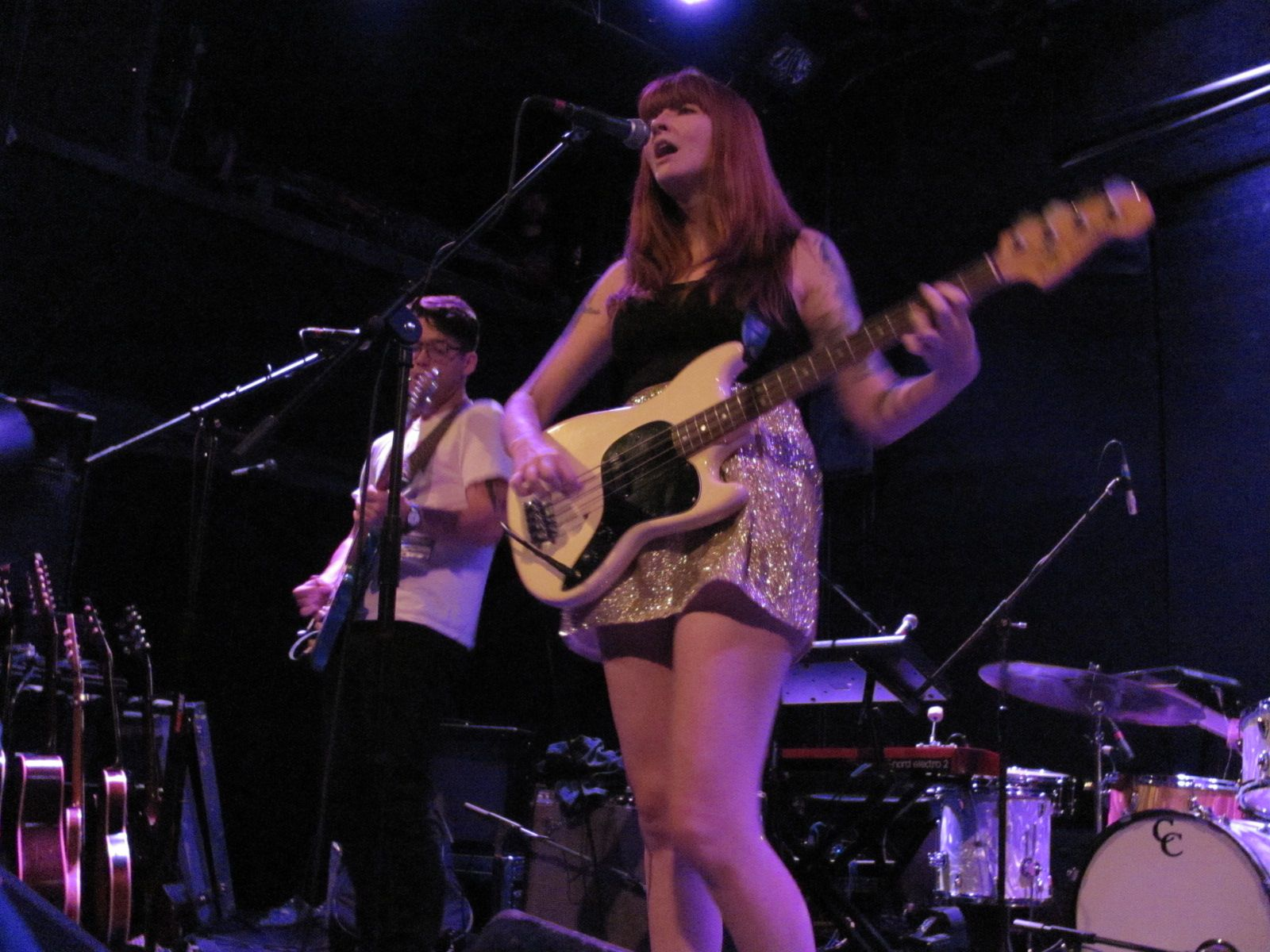
- La Sera performing at Bowery Ballroom in New York, 2012

Background information
- Origin: Los Angeles, California
- Genres: Indie rock, noise pop, dream pop
- Years active: 2010–2016
- Labels: Hardly Art, Polyvinyl Record Co.
- Spinoff of: Vivian Girls
- Members: Katy Goodman; Todd Wisenbaker
- Past members: Brady Hall; Rob Barbato; Dan Allaire; Daniel Gomez; Greta Morgan; Jennifer Prince; Jonathan Weinberg; Michael Gleeson; Nate Lotz

La Sera was an American indie rock band formed by Katy Goodman, the bassist for Vivian Girls, in 2010. They have released four albums and toured internationally.

== History ==
La Sera, whose name means "the evening" in Italian, started in 2010, with Goodman writing songs and Brady Hall producing. The video for their first single "Never Come Around" was released on Halloween 2010. Following the release of their self-titled debut album in February 2011, La Sera toured the US with Tennis and Europe with Jenny Lewis.

La Sera's second studio album Sees the Light, released in March 2012, was produced by Rob Barbato (Darker My Love). The album's opening track, "Love That's Gone", is featured in the music video game Rocksmith 2014. Following the release of Sees the Light, the band toured the US with Father John Misty. In 2012, Todd Wisenbaker joined the band, which at that time also included Nate Lotz on drums and Greta Morgan on rhythm guitar. Around the same time, Goodman moved from Brooklyn to Los Angeles.

La Sera released their third album, Hour of the Dawn, in May 2014. It was produced by Todd Wisenbaker (Whispertown 2000, Jenny and Johnny) and engineered by Joel Jerome (Babies on Acid, Dios) during the summer of 2013. In contrast to previous records, Goodman worked with the other band members on the songs, noting that they "all worked on the new record for about a year, writing and editing". During production, the band decided to make the album's sound "'80s rock. The Smiths, The Pretenders". Wisenbaker contributed the song "10 Headed Goat Wizard" and described the album as "a classic American record". The critical reaction described Hour of the Dawn as having "new-found optimism".

La Sera toured with Kate Nash and The Julie Ruin in Fall 2013 to promote the album. After the album's release, the band did a full European tour with Springtime Carnivore, which ended at Primavera Festival. La Sera also did a West Coast tour with King Tuff, and the show on November 6, 2014, was filmed to air on Last Call with Carson Daly. Three songs, "Please Be My Third Eye," "Fall in Place," and "10 Headed Goat Wizard", were aired on Last Call on March 17, 2015. The music video for "Fall in Place" was premiered by Entertainment Weekly on June 11, 2014.

In March 2016, La Sera released the Ryan Adams-produced Music For Listening To Music To through Polyvinyl. The album's release was preceded by the single "High Notes" in December 2015. The album's second single, "I Need an Angel", was released in March 2016.

Goodman worked with Greta Morgan on a collection of punk covers with '60s pop arrangements that was released as Take It, It's Yours through Polyvinyl in August 2016.

== Personal life ==
Goodman is originally from New Jersey.

She was married to Todd Wisenbaker while the band was active and lives in Los Angeles.

=== Technical career ===
Goodman has a bachelor's degree in physics and a master's in education of physics from Rutgers, and worked as a part-time coder for CASH Music.

== Discography ==
=== Studio albums ===
Title	Album details	Top Heat
La Sera	Released: February 15, 2011; Label: Hardly Art, Burger; Formats: CD, LP, MC, Digital download	—
Sees the Light	Released: March 27, 2012; Label: Hardly Art, Burger; Formats: CD, LP, MC, digital download	18
Hour of the Dawn	Released: May 13, 2014; Label: Hardly Art; Formats: CD, LP, digital download	35
Music for Listening to Music to	Released: March 4, 2016; Label: Polyvinyl; Formats: CD, LP, digital download	17

=== Singles ===
Title	Year	Album
"Never Come Around"	2010	La Sera
"Devils Hearts Grow Gold"	2011	—N/a

=== Music videos ===
Title	Year	Director
"Never Come Around"	2010	Brady Hall
"Devils Hearts Grow Gold"	2011	Sean Tillmann
"Please Be My Third Eye"	2012	Vice Cooler
"Real Boy"/"Drive On"	2012	Travis Peterson
"Break My Heart"	2012	Cassandra Lee Hamilton
"Fall In Place"	2014	Michael Erik Nikolla
"10 Headed Goat Wizard"	2015	Jason Lester
"High Notes"	2016	Jason Lester
"I Need An Angel"	2016	Jason Lester
