= Hour of the Dawn =

Studio album by La Sera
- Released: May 13, 2014
- Genre: Indie rock
- Label: Hardly Art
- Producer: Todd Wisenbaker

La Sera chronology
Sees the Light (2012)	Hour of the Dawn (2014)	Music for Listening to Music to (2016)

Hour of the Dawn is the third studio album by American indie rock band La Sera.

== Reception ==
Professional ratings
Aggregate scores
Source	Rating
Metacritic	75/100
Review scores
Source	Rating
AllMusic	4/5 stars
Consequence of Sound	B
Exclaim!	6/10
The Line of Best Fit	7.5/10
Pitchfork Media	7.1/10
Tiny Mix Tapes	3/5 stars
Under the Radar	7/10 stars

Hour of the Dawn received positive reviews from critics. On Metacritic, the album holds a score of 75/100 based on 14 reviews, indicating "generally favorable reviews".

== Track listing ==
1. Losing To The Dark
2. Summer Of Love
3. Running Wild
4. Fall In Place
5. All My Love Is For You
6. Hour Of The Dawn
7. Kiss This Town Away
8. Control
9. 10 Headed Goat Wizard
10. Storm's End
