= Share the Joy =

Studio album by Vivian Girls
- Released: April 12, 2011
- Recorded: January – August 2010
- Studio: Rear House (Brooklyn, New York); Asha's Space (Brooklyn)
- Genre: Garage rock; psychedelic pop
- Length: 35:33
- Label: Polyvinyl
- Producer: Cassie Ramone; Jarvis Taveniere

Vivian Girls chronology
Everything Goes Wrong (2009)	Share the Joy (2011)	Memory (2019)

Singles from Share the Joy
- 1. "I Heard You Say" Released: April 11, 2011

Professional ratings
Aggregate scores
Source	Rating
AnyDecentMusic?	6.2/10
Metacritic	67/100
Review scores
Source	Rating
AllMusic	4/5 stars
American Songwriter	3/5 stars
The A.V. Club	C−
The Boston Phoenix	3.5/4 stars
DIY	8/10
Mojo	3/5 stars
NME	7/10
Pitchfork	5.9/10
The Skinny	4/5 stars
Spin	6/10

Share the Joy is the third studio album by American indie rock band Vivian Girls. It was released on April 12, 2011, by Polyvinyl Record Co. The album was produced by the band's lead singer and guitarist Cassie Ramone with Woods' Jarvis Taveniere, and was primarily recorded at Taveniere's studio Rear House. It is their only album with drummer Fiona Campbell.

== Track listing ==
All lyrics are written by Cassie Ramone, except where noted; all music is composed by Vivian Girls (Fiona Campbell, Katy Goodman and Ramone), except where noted.

No.	Title	Length
1.	"The Other Girls"	6:28
2.	"I Heard You Say"	2:52
3.	"Dance (If You Wanna)"	2:59
4.	"Lake House"	2:08
5.	"Trying to Pretend"	2:30
6.	"Sixteen Ways" (lyrics and music by Green on Red)	2:45
7.	"Take It as It Comes"	3:00
8.	"Vanishing of Time"	3:58
9.	"Death" (music by Campbell, Goodman, Ramone and Ali Koehler)	2:46
10.	"Light in Your Eyes"	6:07
Total length:		35:33

Japanese edition bonus track
No.	Title	Length
11.	"I Won't Be Long"	2:02
Total length:		37:35

== Personnel ==
Credits are adapted from the album's liner notes.

Vivian Girls

- Fiona Campbell – drums, percussion, vocals
- Katy Goodman – bass, vocals
- Cassie Ramone – guitar, lead vocals, production, artwork, layout

Additional personnel

- John Golden – mastering
- Ali Koehler – drums on "Death"
- Dave Seidel – celeste on "Light in Your Eyes"
- Jarvis Taveniere – organ, additional guitar, production, recording

== Charts ==
Chart (2011)	Peak position
US Heatseekers Albums (Billboard)	20
