= Our House on the Hill =

Studio album by the Babies
- Released: November 13, 2012
- Recorded: February 2012 at Rear House in New York City and Comp-ny Studios in Los Angeles
- Genre: Indie rock
- Length: 35:08
- Label: Woodsist
- Producer: Rob Barbato

The Babies chronology
Cry Along with the Babies (2011)	Our House on the Hill (2012)

Professional ratings
Aggregate scores
Source	Rating
Metacritic	70/100
Review scores
Source	Rating
AllMusic	3.5/5 stars
Boston Phoenix	2.5/4 stars
Exclaim!	8/10
Filter Magazine	84%
Paste Magazine	6.8/10
Pitchfork	7.8/10
This Is Fake DIY	7/10

Our House on the Hill is the second studio album by American rock band the Babies. It was released in November 2012 under Woodsist Records.

== Track list ==
No.	Title	Length
1.	"Alligator"	2:13
2.	"Slow Walkin"	3:01
3.	"Mess Me Around"	2:15
4.	"Get Lost"	3:18
5.	"Baby"	2:54
6.	"Mean"	3:04
7.	"On My Team"	2:28
8.	"Moonlight Mile"	2:29
9.	"See The Country"	3:03
10.	"That Boy"	3:45
11.	"Chase it to the Grave"	3:24
12.	"Wandering"	3:14
Total length:		35:08

== Personnel ==
The Babies

- Kevin Morby – vocals, guitar
- Cassie Ramone – vocals, guitar, artwork, layout
- Brian Schleyer – bass
- Justin Sullivan – drums

Additional musicians

- Tim Presley – guitar, organ
- Jenna Thornhill Dewitt – saxophone (track 6)
- J.W. Reed – cello (track 12)

Production

- Rob Barbato – producer, engineer, mixing, piano (tracks 1, 3), organ (tracks 7, 8, 9)
- Jarvis Taveniere – engineer (track 6)
- Drew Fischer – engineer, mixing
- Josh Bonati – mastering
- Matt Rubin – photography
