= Foot Village =

- Origin: Los Angeles, California, United States
- Years active: 2007-2013
- Website: footvillage.org

Foot Village is a tribal noise rock band based in Los Angeles, California. The band consists of members Brian Miller, Grace Lee, Gregory Witscher, and Josh Taylor.

The band has been described as a "drum-n-shout assembly". In a review of their 2009 album Anti-Magic, Pitchfork described the work of Foot Village as "loud, spastic, and often complicated". The band went on various tours from 2007 to 2013. Performances took place in the United States, the United Kingdom, and France; but most frequently in Los Angeles.

Foot Village also appears on the compilation DVD Live at the Smell and on a VPRO video, filmed at an Amsterdam show. The track "Wherever the Fuck Arnold Schwarzenegger's From" appears on the Methodist Leisure Inc freebie funcore compilation Short Attention Span (2009, Methodist Leisure Inc.) The band have been chosen by Portishead to perform at the ATP I'll Be Your Mirror festivals that they have curated in July 2011 at London's Alexandra Palace, and in September 2011 in Asbury Park, New Jersey.

Despite achieving little mainstream success, two of Foot Village's albums, Anti-Magic and Make Memories, have received positive reviews from online music publication Pitchfork. Experimental hip hop band Clipping featured a remix of the Foot Village track "This Song Is a Drug Deal" on their 2018 extended play Face.

== Discography ==
=== Studio albums ===
- Friendship Nation (2008)
- Anti-Magic (2009)
- World Fantasy (2010)
- Make Memories (2013)

=== Compilations ===
- Fuck The Future (2007)
- Fuck The Future II (2009)
- Chicken And Cheese Covers (2009)

== Videography ==
- Live at the Smell, DVD
