= Erika M. Anderson =

American singer and songwriter

EMA
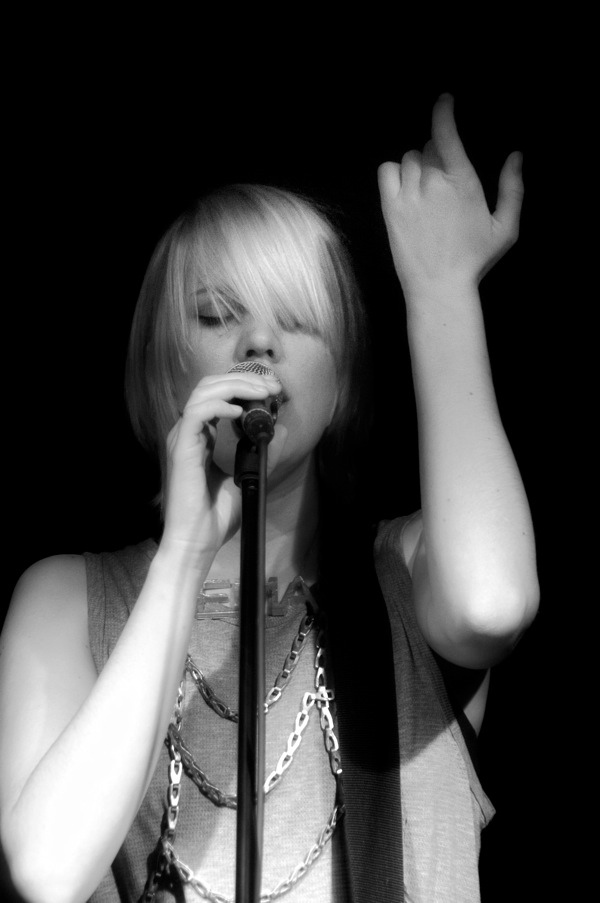
- EMA performing at the Berghain in Berlin on May 5, 2011

Background information
- Born: Erika Michelle Anderson; January 28, 1982 (age 44); South Dakota, United States
- Genres: Noise-folk; noise rock; freak folk
- Occupations: Singer-songwriter; guitarist; visual artist
- Instruments: Vocals; guitar; electronics; bass
- Years active: 2006–present
- Labels: Night People; Souterrain Transmissions; Matador
- Website: www.iwannadestroy.com

Erika Michelle Anderson (born January 28, 1982), better known by her stage name EMA, is an American singer and songwriter originally from South Dakota, who presently lives in Portland, Oregon.

== Career ==
From 2006 to 2010 Anderson fronted the noise-folk band Gowns, releasing one album, 2007's Red State. After the group disbanded, she released her debut album Little Sketches on Tape in 2010 on Night People, an independent music label founded by former Raccoo-oo-oon member Shawn Reed. She also played guitar in experimental rock band Amps for Christ.

In 2011 EMA released her second album Past Life Martyred Saints, which received positive reviews from Pitchfork Media, Drowned in Sound, and the NME. Following the release of the album, EMA was named "New Band of the Day" by The Guardian, and "Artist to Watch" by Rolling Stone.

In 2011 she performed "Endless, Nameless" for Spin's twentieth anniversary tribute to Nirvana's album Nevermind. Her song "The Grey Ship" was used on an episode of Adult Swim's Off the Air, and in the 2014 Carter Smith film Jamie Marks Is Dead.

The album The Future's Void was released on Matador Records in 2014. She made her network television debut performing on Late Show with David Letterman on August 26, 2014.

EMA released her fourth studio album, Exile in the Outer Ring, on August 25, 2017 through City Slang. The first single was "Aryan Nation" and dedicated to the people of "heartland America", where she is from. The single was inspired by the British skinhead film, This Is England.

In 2023 it was announced that Anderson had joined Sarah Register and Vice Cooler to form Thrash Palace.

== Discography ==
=== Albums ===
- Little Sketches on Tape (Night People, 2010)
- Past Life Martyred Saints (Souterrain Transmissions, 2011)
- The Future's Void (Matador/City Slang, 2014)
- #Horror : Original Score by EMA (Matador, 2015)
- Exile in the Outer Ring (City Slang, August 25, 2017)

=== Singles ===
- "The Grey Ship/Kind Heart" (Souterrain Transmissions, 2011)
- "California" (Souterrain Transmissions, 2011)
- "Soul on Fire" (Hell, Yes!, 2011)
- "Milkman" (Souterrain Transmissions, 2011)
- "Marked/Angelo" (Souterrain Transmissions, 2011)
- "Take One Two" (Souterrain Transmissions, 2012)
- "Satellites" (City Slang, 2013)
- "So Blonde" (City Slang, 2014)
- "3Jane" (City Slang, 2014)
- "Active Shooter" (City Slang, 2015)
- "Amnesia Haze" (City Slang, 2015)
- "Aryan Nation" (City Slang, 2017)
- "Breathalyzer" (City Slang, 2017)
- "Down and Out" (City Slang, 2017)
