= Dropsy (video game) =

2015 video game

- Developers: Tendershoot; A Jolly Corpse
- Publisher: Devolver Digital
- Directors: Jay Tholen; Jesse Bull
- Designers: Jay Tholen; Jesse Bull
- Programmer: David Walton
- Artists: Jay Tholen; Jesse Bull
- Writers: Jay Tholen; Jesse Bull
- Composers: Jay Tholen; Chris Schlarb
- Engine: Unity
- Platforms: Microsoft Windows; OS X; Linux; iOS; Android; Nintendo Switch
- Release: Windows, OS X, Linux; September 10, 2015; iOS; December 17, 2015; Android; December 20, 2017; Switch; September 29, 2022
- Genre: Point-and-click adventure
- Mode: Single-player

Dropsy is a 2015 point-and-click adventure video game developed by American indie developer Tendershoot (pseudonym of Jay Tholen) and the indie development studio A Jolly Corpse, and published by Devolver Digital. The game was released on September 10, 2015 for Microsoft Windows, OS X, Linux. The iOS port of Dropsy was released on December 17, 2015. The Nintendo Switch version was released on September 29, 2022.

== Gameplay and plot ==
Dropsy is a point-and-click adventure centered on a clown named Dropsy. Players control Dropsy while exploring an open world in which they can interact with the environment, solve puzzles, and talk to non-player characters. In the game, Dropsy becomes an outcast after a fire at his family's circus and must work to discover the truth behind it in order to clear his name. The game contains no text, so dialogue is represented by visual icons. The game features over 50 minutes of live music composed and performed by Chris Schlarb.

== Development ==
Dropsy began on the Something Awful forums in 2008 as a choose-your-own adventure game illustrated by Jay Tholen about a clown named Dropsy; forum commentators would suggest what the character would do and the choices would be illustrated and added to the story. The character originated from a platform game created by Tholen in 2004. Demand for a playable version of the story increased and so Tholen began designing a game based around the story with the help of some members of the forum. Tholen cites games such as EarthBound, Grim Fandango, and The Neverhood as inspirations for the game. In 2011 a Kickstarter campaign raised $225 USD to fund a software package to help development, followed by another campaign in July 2013 which did not reach its $25,000 USD goal. A third campaign, started in October 2013, asked for $14,000 USD and finished with nearly $25,000 USD raised. On October 31, 2013, Tholen released a short horror-themed side game titled Dropsy and the Black Lodge. In November it was announced that Devolver Digital would be publishing the game, providing quality assurance and marketing, but not directing where the Kickstarter funds would be spent. On September 17, 2014, indie studio A Jolly Corpse joined the team. One year later on September 10, 2015, the game was released for Microsoft Windows, OS X and Linux.

== Reception ==
Reception

Aggregate score
Aggregator	Score
Metacritic	(PC) 80/100 (NS) 70/100

Review scores
Publication	Score
4Players	78%
Adventure Gamers	2.5/5
Destructoid	9.5/10
GameRevolution	9/10
GameSpot	(Mac) 7/10
Hardcore Gamer	3.5/5
PC Gamer (UK)	78%
TouchArcade	(NS) 3.5/5
VentureBeat	80/100
VideoGamer.com	8/10
National Post	9/10

The PC version received "favorable" reviews, while the Switch version received "average" reviews, according to the review aggregation website Metacritic.

Adam Smith for Rock Paper Shotgun called Dropsy a "touching allegory for all manner of otherness and confusion" but criticized the game's surrealist presentation and puzzle mechanics.

== See also ==
- Hypnospace Outlaw
