= Vivian Girls (album) =

Studio album by Vivian Girls
- Released: May 2008
- Recorded: January 2008
- Studios: Civil Defense League (Brooklyn, New York)
- Genres: Noise pop; lo-fi; art punk; garage rock; shoegaze
- Length: 21:27
- Label: Mauled by Tigers

Vivian Girls chronology
Vivian Girls (2008)	Everything Goes Wrong (2009)

Singles from Vivian Girls
- 1. "Wild Eyes" Released: 2008; 2. "Tell the World" Released: 2008

Vivian Girls is the debut studio album by American indie rock band Vivian Girls. It was released in May 2008 by the label Mauled by Tigers. It is their only album featuring original drummer Frankie Rose.

After Mauled by Tigers' limited pressing of 500 LP copies quickly sold out, Vivian Girls was reissued on CD and LP by In the Red Records on October 7, 2008. It was reissued again by Polyvinyl Record Co. in 2019, alongside its 2009 follow-up Everything Goes Wrong.

== Composition ==
Vivian Girls has been described by critics as an album of lo-fi and noise pop music. Paste's Henry Freedland said that it exhibits Vivian Girls' fusion of art punk and shoegaze-pop, while NME noted the presence of garage rock elements.

== Critical reception ==
Professional ratings
Aggregate scores
Source	Rating
Metacritic	80/100
Review scores
Source	Rating
AllMusic	3.5/5 stars
The A.V. Club	A−
Blender	3.5/5 stars
NME	8/10
Paste	8.0/10
Pitchfork	8.5/10

Vivian Girls was met with favorable reviews from music critics. The album holds a score of 80 out of 100 on the review aggregation website Metacritic, based on 15 reviews. NME stated that "between the omnipresent slabs of reverb, the trio flip between harmonic garage rock, gloomy melodies and twee-Birthday Partyisms". Jesse Darlin' of Plan B praised the songs' melodies as "all hard and spiky on the outside and gooey on the inside, like tough girl music should be."

At the end of 2008, Vivian Girls was named the ninth best album of the year by Rough Trade, while Pitchfork listed it as the year's 16th best album.

=== Legacy ===
Despite being polarizingly received when it was released, Vivian Girls has since grown in status. In a 10th-anniversary retrospective, Stereogum's Patrick D. McDermott dubbed it "an all-killer-no-filler introduction to an awesome band". McDermott wrote of audiences' desire to hear "something catchy but not polished, raw but not mean" in music beyond the "pastoral-sounding boy bands and Coachella-band psych" common at the time. He felt that this was briefly provided by noise pop's late-2000s resurgence, of which the album contained "22 of [its] messiest and most influential minutes".

== Track listing ==
All tracks are written by Vivian Girls (Katy Goodman, Cassie Ramone and Frankie Rose).

No.	Title	Length
1.	"All the Time"	1:57
2.	"Such a Joke"	1:43
3.	"Wild Eyes"	1:55
4.	"Going Insane"	1:29
5.	"Tell the World"	3:36
6.	"Where Do You Run To"	3:15
7.	"Damaged"	2:06
8.	"No"	1:19
9.	"Never See Me Again"	1:41
10.	"I Believe in Nothing"	2:26
Total length:		21:27

== Personnel ==
Credits are adapted from the album's liner notes.

Vivian Girls

- Katy "Kickball Katy" Goodman – bass, vocals
- Cassie Ramone – guitar, lead vocals, cover artwork
- Frankie Rose – drums, vocals

Additional personnel

- Tim Fiore – tambourine
- Jeremy Scott – mixing, recording

== Charts ==
Chart (2008)	Peak position
US Heatseekers Albums (Billboard)	44
