= Jack E. Jett =

American talk show host (1956–2015)

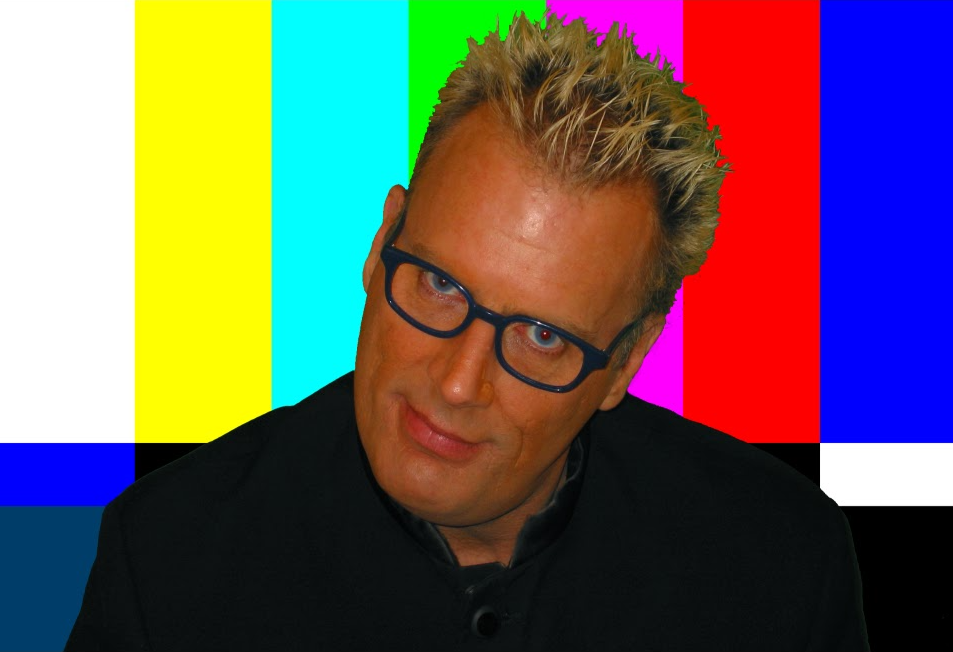
- Jett in January 2003
- Born: June 17, 1956; Dallas County, Texas, U.S.
- Died: March 21, 2015 (aged 58); Texas, U.S.
- Other name: Jhett
- Education: Humber College
- Occupations: Television personality, host
- Years active: 2003–2015
- Known for: The Queer Edge with Jack E. Jett
- Website: jackejettshow.com

Jack E. Jett (June 17, 1956 – March 21, 2015) was the first openly gay American talk show host.

== Early life and career ==
Jack E. Jett grew up in Dallas, Texas, and moved to Los Angeles at the age of 21. He held various jobs in the entertainment industry while in Los Angeles; among them, he was the Talent Agency Representative for the American Federation of Television and Radio Artists (AFTRA). He then went through the Creative Artist training program.

Through a fluke meeting at The China Club in the early 1980s, Jett was offered a contract to model for Cinq Deux Un ("521"), an agency in Tokyo, Japan. Jett's modeling career lasted for the next eight years. Then known as "Jhett," he became one of the highest paid male models in the world in 1982, with contracts in Milan, Paris, Los Angeles, and Barcelona. Jett also appeared in Playgirl that year, in a profile about his career and life in Beverly Hills. He met The Go-Go's lead singer Belinda Carlisle, and they quickly became best friends.

Upon retiring from modeling, Jett began to travel with The Go-Go's, handling various tasks such as press, travel, interview schedules, and luggage handling. During Carlisle's solo career, he worked as her personal assistant.

In 1988, Jett dropped the name Jhett.

== Television production ==
He was offered the position of U.S. Representative for Prime Television, an Australian broadcast network. He worked as a liaison between the American production companies and the network's executives. Prime was an aggregator of television programming, supplying programming for local stations. Jett developed projects for these stations to produce, in addition to finding new programs from the United States for them to broadcast.

After a few years he grew tired of the long-distance travel, and wanted to stay near his home in West Hollywood, California. He accepted a position as a coordinator for the CBS Television City comedy casting department. This position allowed him to find up-and-coming comedy talent in various Equity-waiver theatres and comedy clubs, and arrange meetings between those comedians and various casting executives.

By the time he was 40, Jett had lost 40 friends to the AIDS epidemic. He began volunteer work with the charitable organizations Aid For AIDS, Elizabeth Taylor’s amfAR, and Cable Positive.

== The Jack E. Jett Show ==
In early 1990, Jett returned to his native Dallas, Texas. Having been an avid fan of public-access television cable TV in Los Angeles, Jett found a very limited public-access television selection in Dallas. He decided to create a show that featured various oddball characters and freaks of nature. The show became a local cult classic, and soon became available on cable access stations in New York, Los Angeles, San Francisco, Houston, and Austin.

In early 2002 Chris Rentzel replied to an ad in the Dallas Observer that Jett had placed requesting quirky short films. Rentzel submitted some of his Triangle Woman short films to Jett and a collaboration was formed shortly after. They co-produced approximately 30 shows together between 2002 and 2004.

As a result of that, PrideVision Television in Canada (later renamed OUTtv) offered Jett the chance to move from public-access television to national cable television. Jett and Rentzel produced 12 episodes specifically for PrideVision. The show later became one of the first programs on the Q Television Network, the first American television network catering to the LGBT community.

In January 2021, Rentzel started uploading episodes of this original cable access show. The goal is to upload one show per week until finished.

== On Q Live ==
When radio DJ Jagger bowed out of a new program on Q Television called On Q Live, the hosting job was offered to Jett. The show was a four-hour chat fest that included various guests. The show was highly audience-interactive, with viewer call-ins, webcam conversations, and emails. Over 150 episodes were produced. The show was seen five nights a week, and catered exclusively to the gay and lesbian community.

== The Queer Edge ==
As someone who preferred his programs to be a little more "on the edge," Jett developed a show that would eventually become the network's top premiere program. The Queer Edge with Jack E. Jett became hit on the network. Each week a different co-host would join Jett. Co-hosts included Charo, Kim Coles, Butch Patrick (The Munsters), and Randy Jones (The Village People).

Jett's regular co-hostess was Jackie Enx. Enx is a transsexual radio personality, who hosted a segment called "Fun with Hypocrisy." Enx was formerly known as Liam Jason, the drummer for the rock band Rhino Bucket.

A featured co-host was the internationally famous Sandra Bernhard, and she signed on to become a regular part of The Queer Edge. The Queer Edge with Jack E. Jett and Sandra Bernhard ran for another 40 episodes, until Q Television folded. The show featured a cavalcade of quirky celebrities such as Judy Tenuta, Alan Cumming, Donald Trump acolyte Omarosa Manigault Newman, and Keegan-Michael Key to name a few.

When Q Television began to falter, a new management team was sent in, but the network was never able to recover. As a result, Jett ended up with total ownership of the 145 episodes of The Queer Edge. The shows can be seen on TLA Video On Demand, as well as Jett's own online channel, FUTV in JetTVision, operated in conjunction with World of Wonder.

The Queer Edge with Jack E. Jett and Sandra Bernhard was one of the first chat shows picked up by ManiaTV!.

== Later work ==
In the year of 2001, Jack E. Jett released a DVD through TLA Video entitled The Gayest Show on Earth. This DVD quickly became a viral cult classic. The DVDs were sent to various college dorms around the world. The DVD quickly sold out and is out of print.

Jett has been involved with Ring My Bell for World of Wonder TV. He has been a substitute host for Cheaters, and hosted a new pilot for Bobby Goldstein Productions, Love Sick.

The Dallas Observer stated that Jett was to host a new program on Dallas radio station KFXR-AM "CNN 1190" starting on January 25, 2010. In the newspaper's blog posting announcing the show, Jett was quoted as saying

I don't just go in and talk on the mike while I'm jacking my cock. I research. I want to have as many eclectic guests as I do and be able to do that with less research.

The next day, station producer J.D. Freeman announced that the show had been cancelled, saying "The guy shows bad judgement, and I wouldn't put him on the air. Any personality who uses that language is not someone we want on the air."

As of May 2010, Jett was co-hosting a show with Rob Lobster on Dallas-area AM station KFCD called ilume-A-Nation Radio, featuring what Jett called "guilty pleasure yourself songs," once-popular songs now widely disliked.

== Death ==
Jack E. Jett died of a heart attack in Texas on March 21, 2015, soon after celebrating his 21st anniversary with his partner, John Gennusa.
