= Pehrspace =

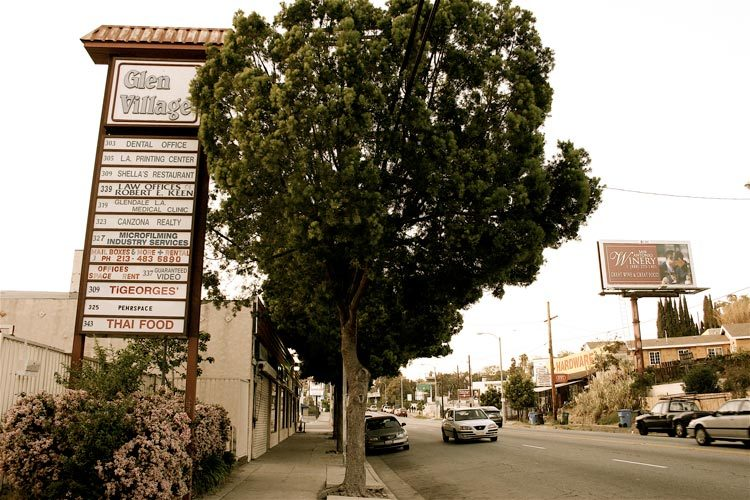
- Interactive map of Pehrspace
- Location: 325 Glendale Boulevard, Los Angeles CA 90026
- Coordinates: 34°03′59.4″N 118°15′38.1″W
- Type: Music venue
- Events: Music venue, art gallery

Construction
- Opened: 2006
- Closed: 2017

Website
- www.pehrspace.org

Pehrspace was an Indie music venue and art gallery situated in Historic Filipinotown, Los Angeles. It was founded in 2006 by Adam Hervey and Darren King, and was later owned and operated by Pauline Lay.

== History ==
Founded in 2006 by Adam Hervey and Darren King, and later owned and operated by Pauline Lay, Pehrspace was an all-ages, not-for-profit art space. Pehrspace was run by volunteers, inspired and influenced by venues Jabberjaw and Timbrespace. Pehrspace was run under Pehr Arts Ltd. a 501(c)3 organization.

Pehrspace hosted experimental cinema nights, free clothes swaps, craft fairs, and exhibits. The building itself performed multiple functions, acting as a rehearsal space and recording studio during the weekday and a venue at night. A variety of professionals, from masseuses to voice teachers, rented out the adjoining office spaces and contributed to Pehrspace during their occupancy.

== Notable performers ==
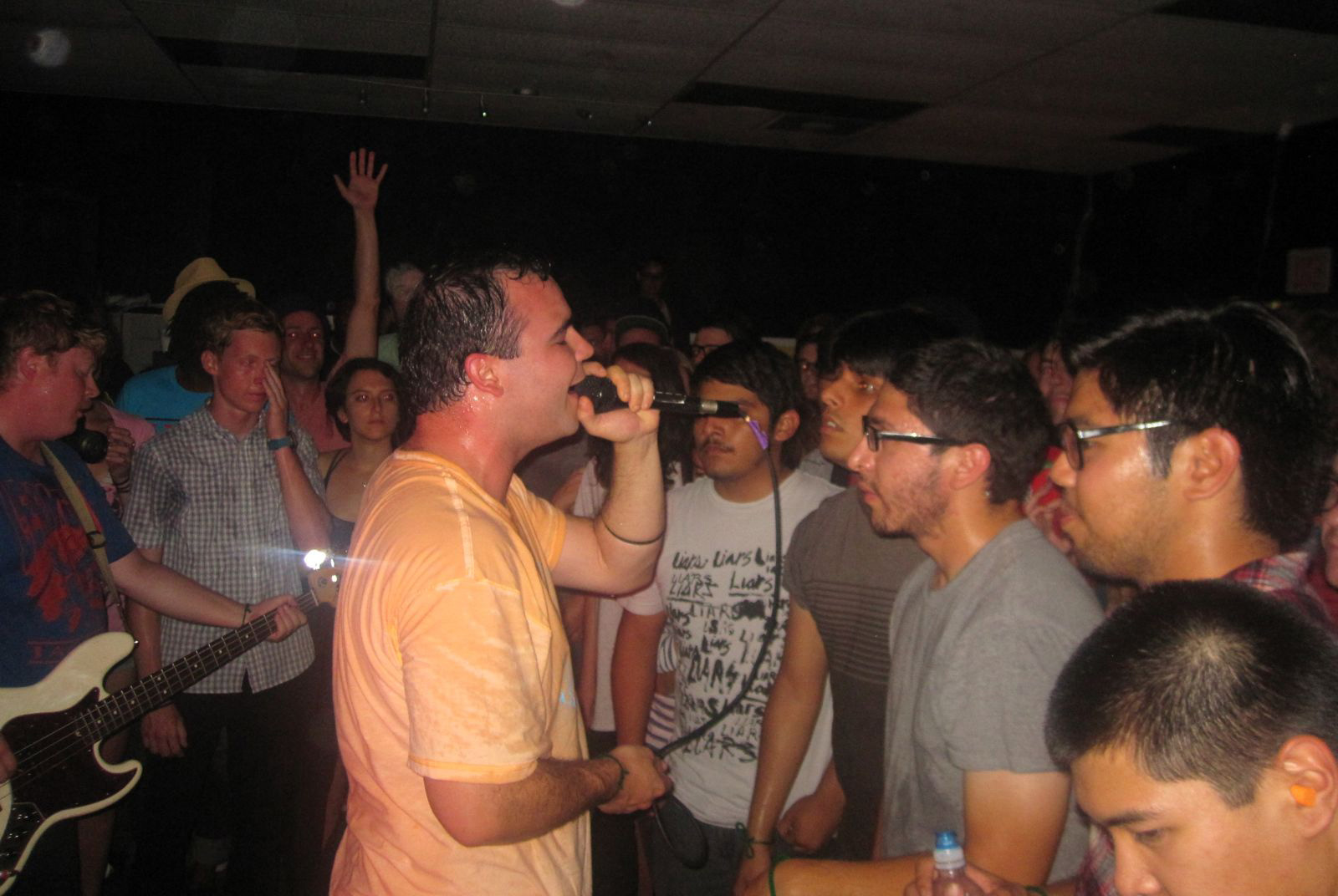
Future Islands performing at Pehrspace, September 5, 2011.

Bands like HEALTH and No Age performed here. From 2007-2014, Sean Carnage promoted his Monday-night shows at Pehrspace. Sean Carnage Monday Nights became a Los Angeles staple, showing and promoting new bands every week.

== In popular culture ==
Pehrspace was recognized as “Best Small Venue in L.A. 2014” by L.A. Weekly. In 2020, a documentary movie about Pehrspace called “Sean Carnage Parking Lot” was released starring Val Kilmer, Dan Deacon, Future Islands, Lucky Dragons, Juiceboxxx, Vice Cooler and more. The movie was recorded on September 5, 2011, at Pehrspace in Echo Park, Los Angeles.

== Closure and relocation ==
On June 6, 2016, the all-ages space posted a photo to Facebook of a 60-day tenancy termination notice left on its door. The venue posted in an update to their Facebook page, which has been inundated with messages of support and dismay from its fans. Following lease termination, Pehrspace began crowdfunding to relocate.
