= Cassie Ramone =

American musician

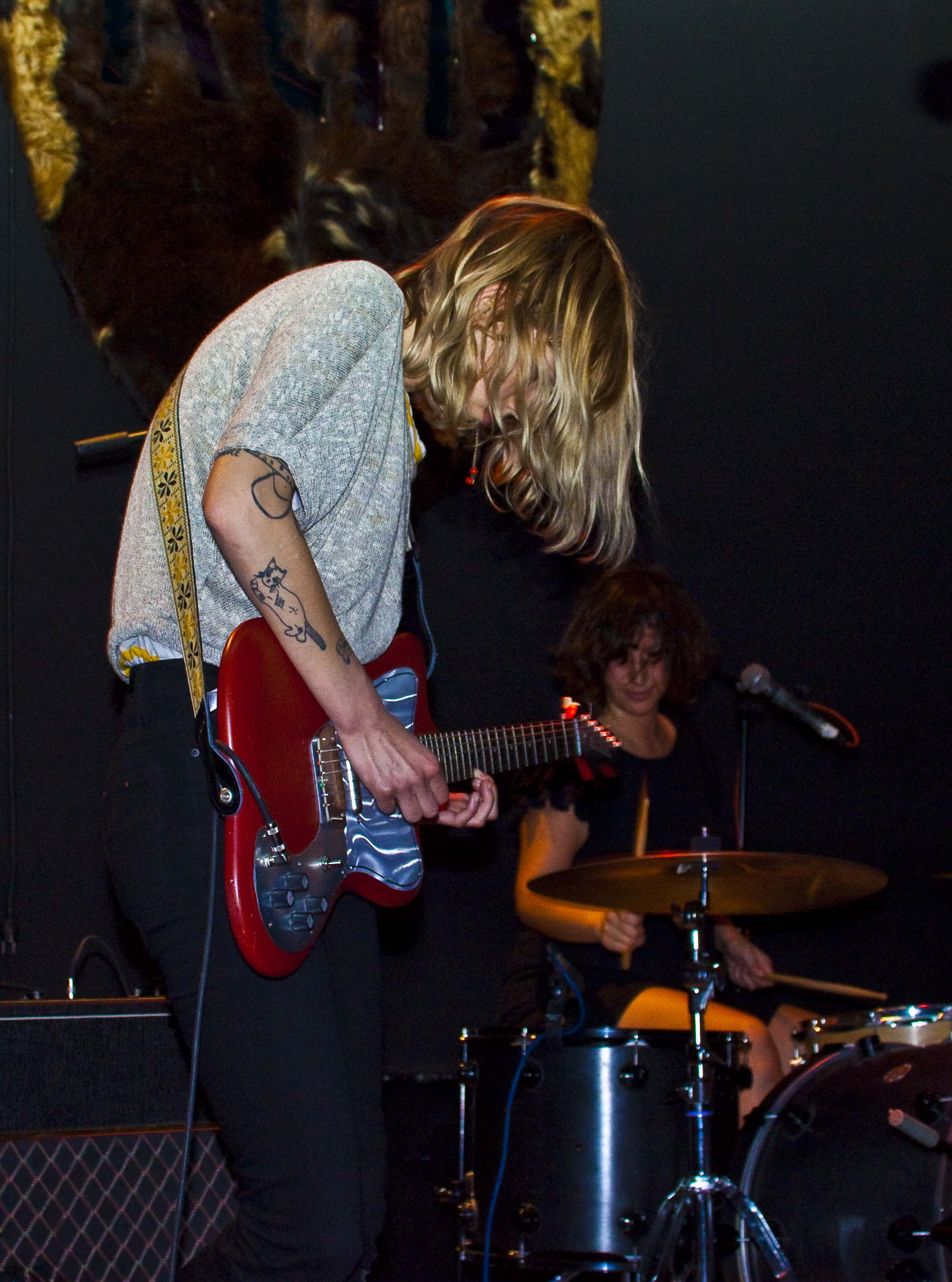
- Cassie Ramone performing with Vivian Girls at KGB, 2011

Background information
- Born: Monica Cassia Grzymkowski; March 17, 1986 (age 40); New Jersey, United States
- Genres: Indie rock, lo-fi
- Occupations: Musician, singer-songwriter, guitarist, artist
- Instruments: Vocals, guitar
- Years active: 2007–present
- Label: Loglady

Cassie Ramone is an American songwriter, musician and artist. Ramone rose to prominence as the guitarist and vocalist of indie rock band Vivian Girls, who formed in 2007 and achieved international success with the release of their debut album Vivian Girls in 2008. She also formed the band project the Babies with Kevin Morby (of Woods). During the Babies' hiatus, Ramone embarked on a solo career, releasing her debut album The Time Has Come in August 2014.

== Biography ==
Born and raised in Ridgewood, New Jersey, Ramone attended Ridgewood High School, where she met her later bandmate Katy Goodman. In 2004, she moved to Brooklyn and began studying at Pratt Institute.

Ramone formed the band Bossy along with Jamie Ewing and Justin Sullivan, that lasted until 2007. The same year, she co-found the indie rock band Vivian Girls with Goodman and Frankie Rose. They released three albums, Vivian Girls (2008), Everything Goes Wrong (2009) and Share the Joy (2011), before breaking up in 2014. In 2019, the band reformed and released their fourth album, Memory. After meeting Kevin Morby of Woods, they started a side project called the Babies who released albums in 2011 and 2012.

In 2014, Ramone embarked a solo career and released her debut album The Time Has Come, featuring Ariel Pink on bass. In early 2015, she formed Melt, who only conceived a demo. She also formed another band with Dee Dee from Dum Dum Girls and OJ from XRay Eyeballs called OCDPP. They debuted as a live act in 2015 and released an EP called 7" Long Player in 2020.

Ramone released a Christmas album titled Christmas in Reno on December 11, 2015.

On June 28, 2024, Ramone released her third studio album, Sweetheart, on YouTube as a full-length music video.

== Art ==
Apart from music, Ramone is an artist who designed the cover art for the Vivian Girls and the Babies' discography. She also does drawings, paintings, sculptures and collages that uploads in her Instagram and Flickr accounts, as well as on her website.

== Influences ==
Ramone cites Neil Young, The Wipers, Burt Bacharach, The Shangri-las, The Bananas, The Carpenters, Dead Moon and Elliott Smith among her favorite artists.

== Discography ==
=== Solo artist ===
==== Studio albums ====
Title	Album details
The Time Has Come	Released: August 26, 2014; Label: Loglady; Formats: LP, Digital download
Christmas In Reno	Released: December 11, 2015; Label: Burger; Formats: LP, Digital download
Sweetheart	Released: September 17, 2024; Label: CD-R Records; Formats: LP, Digital download

==== Split singles ====
Year	Single	Other artist
2010	"The Beets/Cassie Ramone"	The Beets
2013	"Less Artists More Condos Series #5"	Hunx
2013	"I'm a Freak/Only You"	Xray Eyeballs

==== Album appearances ====
Year	Song	Artist	Album
2010	"Are Your Parents Still Together?"	Gospel Music	Duettes
2014	"Hanging On"	Various Artists	Love Anyway!!! Even If... Fuck Off!!! (The Hi-Lo Tunez Plan: 20th Step)

=== with Bossy ===
- The Best of Bossy (2009)

=== with Vivian Girls ===
- Vivian Girls (2008)
- Everything Goes Wrong (2009)
- Share the Joy (2011)
- Memory (2019)

=== with The Babies ===
- The Babies (2011)
- Our House on the Hill (2012)
