= Captain Ahab (band) =

American musical duo

- Origin: Los Angeles, California, United States
- Genres: Electropop, jumpstyle
- Years active: 1998–2012
- Labels: Deathbomb Arc; Irritant Records; Cock Rock Disco
- Past members: Jonathan Snipes; Jim Merson

Captain Ahab was an American electronic music duo based in Los Angeles, California. They referred to their DIY take on jumpstyle and electropop music as "ravesploitation". The band was made up of producer/vocalist Jonathan Snipes and hype man Jim Merson.

They were known for their provocative lyrics and high-energy shows where a sweaty, half-dressed Merson would descend into the crowd to dance and grind on audience members.

In June 2006, Captain Ahab won a contest to have their song "Snakes on the Brain" included on the enhanced CD portion of the soundtrack to the film Snakes on a Plane.

On September 28, 2006, their song "Girls Gone Wild" was played briefly in "The Convention", the second episode of the third season of The Office.

Their single "Was Love" was written for and played in the first-season episode "Gravedancing" on the Syfy series Caprica, as well as the remix of Maxfemm's "Weak Condition"

They played their final show at The Smell, in Los Angeles, California on Friday, November 2, 2012, to a sold-out crowd. Also performing that evening were Toxic Lipstick, Foot Village, and Books on Tape. The final show was announced via a music video on Vimeo on September 16, 2012.

Snipes is now a member of the experimental and industrial hip hop trio clipping., alongside fellow producer William Hutson and rapper Daveed Diggs.

== Discography ==
- The End of Irony (2010) (on Deathbomb Arc Records)
- Split 12" with Copy [rave002_ Ravesploitation Records (Deathbomb Arc Records)]
- Captain Jumpstyle (2007)
- The Great Disappointment (2006) (on Hatestate Records)
- Snakes on the Brain CD EP (2006) (on Deathbomb Arc Records)
- After the Rain My Heart Still Dreams (2006) (on Deathbomb Arc Records)
- I Can't Believe It's Not Booty 12" (2005) (on Deathbomb Arc Records)
- I Am Become Ass tour CD-R (2005)
- Split 7" with KIT (as "Bodahab" with Rose for Bohdan; 2005 on Hug Life Records)
- Captain Ahab & Rose for Bohdan – No More Hot Carls VHS (2004 on Deathbomb Arc)
- The Sex is Next (2004 on A2 Audio)
- Nintendoclash tour EP with Swimming is Floating (2003)
- Bot Pirate 12" (2002 on Irritant Records)
