= Vivian Girls =

American band

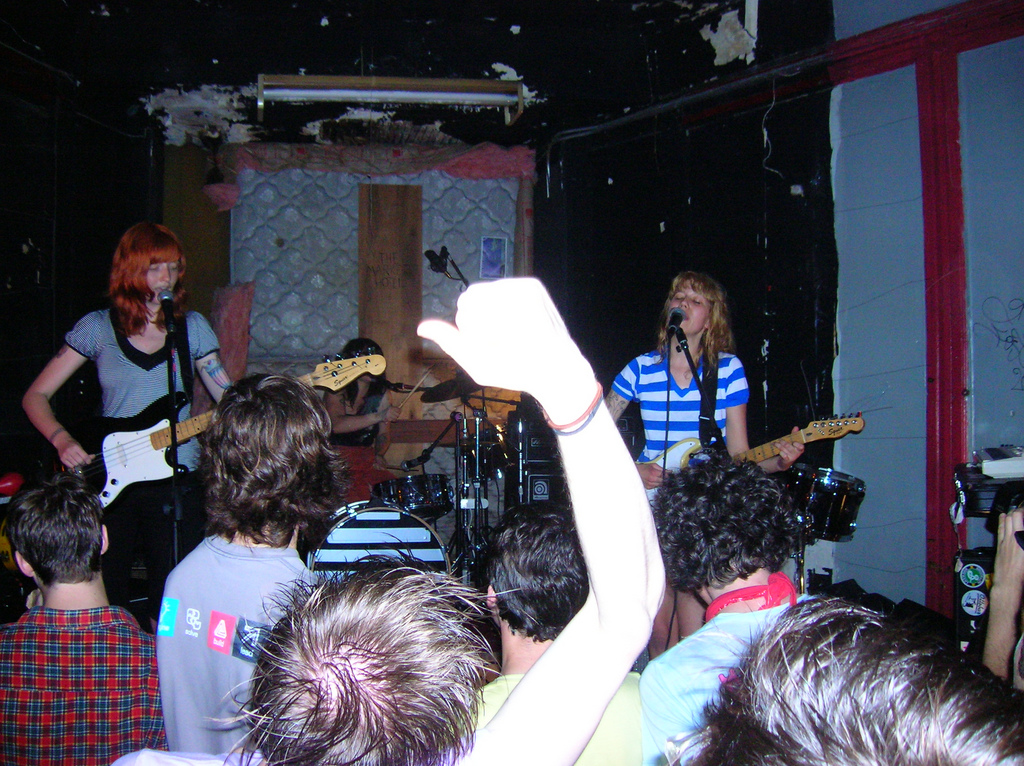
- Vivian Girls at The Market Hotel, Brooklyn, 2008

Background information
- Origin: Brooklyn, New York, United States
- Genres: Indie rock, dream pop, noise pop, lo-fi
- Years active: 2007–2014, 2019–present
- Labels: Polyvinyl, In the Red
- Members: Cassie Ramone; Katy "Kickball Katy" Goodman; Ali Koehler
- Past members: Fiona Campbell; Frankie Rose

Vivian Girls is an American band based in Brooklyn, New York. The only consistent members have been Cassie Ramone and Katy Goodman, on guitar and bass, respectively; the group has had several drummers throughout its history. They took their name from a book by outsider artist Henry Darger.

== History ==
=== 2007–2014 ===
Named after Henry Darger's magnum opus, The Story of the Vivian Girls (full title: The Story of the Vivian Girls, in What is Known as the Realms of the Unreal, of the Glandeco-Angelinian War Storm, Caused by the Child Slave Rebellion), Vivian Girls started in Brooklyn, NY in March 2007, as the trio of Cassie Ramone (guitar/vocals), Katy "Kickball Katy" Goodman (bass/drums/vocals), and Frankie Rose (drums/bass/vocals). While only a band for a short while, they recorded a demo, which included five original songs and a Wipers cover, and began to play locally in Brooklyn and Katy and Cassie's home state of New Jersey. Within the first couple of months, they had already developed a strong local following, supporting acts like Jay Reatard, Sonic Youth, and the King Khan & BBQ Show, as well as finding kindred spirits in other local bands, like Cause Co-Motion!, Crystal Stilts, and Woods, with whom they shared many bills and helped develop a local scene, to which the band is still very much connected.

In March 2008, they released the "Wild Eyes" single on the Plays With Dolls label. With very little promotion and distribution, the single became an underground indie hit, as it charted on many college radio playlists and garnered positive reviews on the internet. Recorded in the same session, their debut self-titled LP was released by the Mauled by Tigers label, whose initial pressing of the LP sold out in ten days. During this time, the group signed with In the Red Records, who released a new single in August 2008. In the Red re-released Vivian Girls on LP and CD formats in October 2008.

In July 2008, the band underwent a lineup change, with new drummer Ali Koehler replacing Frankie Rose. The band then went on an extensive tour that saw them visit the US, UK, Australia, New Zealand, Japan, and Puerto Rico in two months.

Their second album, Everything Goes Wrong, was released by In the Red in September 2009. In May 2010, Fiona Campbell replaced Ali Koehler, becoming Vivian Girls' third drummer. With Campbell, they toured their third album, Share the Joy, to Europe, UK, Thailand, Japan, Hong Kong, and the US.

The band also featured on the track "Worse to Come" on noise pop band Male Bonding's debut album Nothing Hurts.

Vivian Girls' third album, Share the Joy, was released in spring 2011 by Polyvinyl Record Co.

In January 2014, the band announced they were breaking up, with two last shows at The Church on York in Los Angeles, and Death by Audio in Brooklyn. They reunited briefly in October 2015 to play two songs at bassist Katy Goodman's wedding.

=== 2019–present ===
On July 17, 2019, Cassie Ramone, Katy Goodman, and Ali Koehler announced the band's reformation, alongside a new full-length album, Memory, to be released in September. It was recorded in 2018 with producer Rob Barbato. On August 14, 2019, a music video for the song "Something to Do", directed by Jason Lester, was released. On September 10, 2019, a music video for the song "Sludge", directed by Alex Ross Perry, was released.

=== Side projects ===
In 2010, Katy Goodman formed All Saints Day, a side project with Cat Power's Gregg Foreman; the band has digitally released one self-titled EP. Her solo project, La Sera, also formed in 2010, has released four albums. In 2013, she collaborated with Springtime Carnivore's Greta Morgan as Books of Love, recording the science fiction-themed love song "Space Time". Goodman and Morgan collaborated again in 2016, releasing the punk covers album Take It, It's Yours.

Cassie Ramone has a side project, The Babies, formed in 2009, with Woods bassist Kevin Morby. The Babies released two studio albums in 2011 and 2012. During The Babies' hiatus, Ramone embarked on a solo career, releasing her debut album, The Time Has Come, in 2014. She released an album of Christmas music, Christmas in Reno, in 2015.

Fiona Campbell is from New Zealand and previously played there in a band called The Coolies. She also played in Coasting, with guitarist Madison Farmer, and in Ian Svenonius' band Chain & The Gang; Campbell was also a co-owner of the now-defunct M'Lady's Records label. She has also worked as a talent booker and promoter, and as a tour manager for bands like Hinds, Mitski, and Shamir. She currently plays in the New Zealand band Guardian Singles, formed in 2015.

Ali Koehler was the touring drummer for Best Coast from 2010 to 2011. In 2013, she formed the band Upset, which has released three albums.

Frankie Rose was formerly the drummer for Crystal Stilts and Dum Dum Girls, and was an original member of the band Beverly. She released her first self-titled solo album as Frankie Rose and the Outs in 2010; under her own name, she has released four albums.

== Band members ==
- Ali Koehler (2008–2010, 2011–2014, 2019–present)
- Cassie Ramone (2007–2014, 2019–present)
- Katy "Kickball Katy" Goodman (2007–2014, 2019–present)

Past members

- Fiona Campbell (2010–2011)
- Frankie Rose (2007–2008)

== Discography ==
=== Albums ===
Year	Album information	Chart positions	
Year	Album information	Billboard 200	Top Heat
2008	Vivian Girls: Debut studio album; Released: September 30, 2008; Label: Mauled by Tigers/In the Red	—	44
2009	Everything Goes Wrong: Second studio album; Released: September 8, 2009; Label: In the Red	—	31
2011	Share the Joy: Third studio album; Released: April 11, 2011; Label: Polyvinyl Record Co.	—	20
2019	Memory: Fourth studio album; Released: September 20, 2019; Label: Polyvinyl Record Co.	—	17

=== EPs ===
Date	Title	Format	Details
2008	Live on the Radio (WFMU 9/1/2008)	CD	150 hand-numbered copies
2009	Live on the Radio (WFMU 9/1/2008)	LP	1000 copies

=== Singles ===
Date	Single	Backed with	Record label	Format	Other details
2008	"Wild Eyes"	"My Baby Wants Me Dead"	Plays With Dolls / Wild World	7" single	4000 copies
2008	"Tell the World"	"I Believe in Nothing" & "Damaged"	Woodsist	7" single	3000 copies
2008	"I Can't Stay"	"Blind Spot" (The Daisy Chain cover)	In the Red	7" single	2000 copies
2008	"Surfin' Away" & "Second Date"	"Girl Don't Tell Me" (The Beach Boys cover)	Wild World	7" single	1000 copies
2009	"Moped Girls"	"Death"	For Us	7" single	1500 copies
2010	"My Love Will Follow Me"	"He's Gone" (The Chantels cover)	Wild World	7" single	2000 copies
2011	"I Heard You Say"	"I Won't Be Long"	Polyvinyl	7" single	2000 copies; Record Store Day release

=== Compilation appearances ===
- Live at KEXP Vol.5 - "I Can't Stay" (2009)
- Methodist Leisure Inc. freebie funcore punk compilation Short Attention Span - "Snack Attack" (Hardcore Mix) (2009, Methodist)
- The World's Lousy With Ideas: Vol. 8 - "Lake House" (2009, Almost Ready Records)
- Rough Trade Shops: Indiepop 09 - "Moped Girls" (Cooperative Music, 2009)
- We Were So Turned On: A Tribute to David Bowie (disc 1) - "John, I'm Only Dancing" (David Bowie cover) (2010, Manimal Vinyl)
