= Widow (disambiguation) =

A widow is a woman whose husband has died; a widower is a man whose wife has died.

Widow, The Widow, Widow's, or Widower may also refer to:

== Arts, entertainment, and media ==
=== TV and film ===
- The Widow (1939 film), an Italian drama film
- The Widow (1955 film), an Italian romantic drama film
- The Widow (TV series), a British television drama released on Amazon Prime in 2019
- "The Widow" (The Cleaner), a 2021 television episode
- Widows (TV series), a British television drama written by Lynda La Plante, aired in 1983 and 1985
- Widows (2011 film), an Argentine comedy-drama film
- Widows (2018 film), an English-language heist film directed by Steve McQueen, adapted from the British TV series
- Widow (1976 film), an American TV film
- The Widower (TV series), a 2014 British drama
- The Widower (2004 film), an Australian film
- The Widower (2026 film), a Bosnia and Herzegovina film

=== Plays ===
- The Widow (play), a 17th-century play
- Widows, a theatre play with Puerto Rican actor Luis Antonio Ramos

=== Music ===
- "The Widow" (song), a 2005 song by The Mars Volta

== Other uses ==
- Widów (disambiguation), several places in Poland
- Widow (typesetting), a final line of a paragraph appearing separately at the top of a page or column
- Widow skimmer, a dragonfly sometimes known simply as Widow
- Widow's succession, a woman who replaces or stands in for her husband in politics
- Widow's walk, a rooftop platform
- Widow's weeds (clothing), mourning clothes
- Widow Von'Du, American drag queen

== See also ==
- Black widow (disambiguation)
- White widow (disambiguation)
- The Merry Widow (disambiguation)
- Whydah Gally, a recovered pirate galleon
- Widow's Peak (disambiguation)
