= Alex Calder (album) =

Unreleased 2017 studio album by Alex Calder

Studio album by Alex Calder
- Released: October 20, 2017 (canceled)
- Recorded: 2016–2017
- Studios: Value Sound Parc Ex; Calder's home
- Genres: Psychedelic pop; bedroom pop; indie pop
- Length: 34:57
- Labels: Captured Tracks (canceled); Self-released
- Producer: Alex Calder

Alex Calder chronology
Bend (2016)	Alex Calder (2017)

Alex Calder is the unreleased second studio album by the Canadian musician Alex Calder. Originally scheduled for release on October 20, 2017, through Captured Tracks, the project was canceled a week before its release date after the label dropped Calder. A stylistic departure from his earlier lo-fi recordings, the album features outside collaborators and was recorded primarily in a shared studio environment. After the album was withheld from release for two years, Calder self-published the completed project as a free digital download in July 2019.

== Background and recording ==
"I'm hoping people notice that this is a somber record, but not meant to be a depressing record. I want someone to listen to my music in headphones in their bed if they are having a bad day or to put it on in the background at a house party to heighten the mood. It's fitting, really, that this album be self-titled, as it is a kind of proclamation of self for Alex, an expression, or admonition really, of who Alex Calder is — the good and the bad, the sad and the goofy, someone who loves to joke around, but is still capable of being serious and expressing himself more personally. For Alex, these dualities are not contradictory, but almost symbiotic – I feel like the two go hand in hand. It's a classic sad clown thing."

— Calder in August 2017

Calder's early solo discography, including his debut EP Time (2013) and his first full-length Strange Dreams (2015), consisted of isolated home recordings. For his second album, Calder opted to record outside of his bedroom.

The majority of Alex Calder was recorded by Calder's friend Garrett Johnson at Value Sound Parc Ex. Calder recorded four of the tracks "Noticing Me", "End of Time", "Sleep Like This", and "Loosen Up" at home. The studio environment facilitated several external collaborations. Caroline Levasseur provided guest vocals on the tracks "Morning Ritual" and "Another Day", while Johnson contributed a vocal feature on "Half An Hour". Conor Donaldson performed drums on "Morning Ritual" and "Slowing Down", and Graham Clyne played synthesizers on "Another Day".

The transition to a professional studio represented a significant departure for Calder. "I was nervous to record in a space that wasn't my bedroom and that wasn't extremely personal," he admitted in a statement on the Captured Tracks website. "But having that second set of eyes from Garrett pushed me in a lot of ways and lead me to not just settle for mediocre takes."

The album's lead single, "Morning Ritual", was one of the oldest songs written for the project. Calder began performing the song live as early as December 2015 during his tours in support of Strange Dreams, describing it at the time as "definitely the most upbeat song in our set." Calder later stated that "Morning Ritual" was "the first song I wrote off of the new album," though it "wasn't properly recorded until most of the rest of the album was done." He described the track as "essentially your typical song about being lazy and not wanting to change. Pretty simple stuff."

== Musical style and themes ==
The album features higher production values and expanded arrangements compared to Calder's earlier work. During the writing process, Calder drew inspiration from the films of Paul Thomas Anderson, vintage anime, and video game soundtracks such as EarthBound and The Legend of Zelda: Ocarina of Time. Musical influences included the band Stereolab and the musician Kate Bush.

Reviewers described the album as "woozy pop", noting its integration of bright, 1960s-inspired melodies with darker undertones. Calder referred to the project as "sad clown music". Tracks such as "Death Beside Me" utilize background harmonies and heavy reverb to create a wider cinematic scope, while critics compared the atmosphere of "Fading Away" to the band Beach House. Austin Town Hall described the lead single "Morning Ritual" as moving "back and forth between bouncing guitar licks and softer moments," finding "that happy spot that should pique listeners before the record drops." Captured Tracks' Facebook announcement described the album as featuring "a dozen ear worming hooks, all so satisfying you feel a deep longing as they fade."

Complex Distractions characterized the record as "the most accessible record he's made," noting that tracks like "Operator", "Noticing Me", and "Another Day" "all feel like these bizarro world pop hits in a dreamt-up late 60s." The reviewer described the album's overall atmosphere as "casually dark and strangely inviting, like a carnival funhouse with nitrous gas pumped into it." The closing track "Goodnight" directly references Calder's friends Jon Lent and Ryan Boyce, addressing them by name in the opening line: "Jon and Ryan may stay up late."

== Cancellation and self-release ==
Captured Tracks announced the album on August 3, 2017, and released "Morning Ritual" as its lead single. The label scheduled the release for October 20. In support of the record, Calder planned a North American fall tour, which included a scheduled release show at Sunnyvale in Brooklyn. The first 500 LP copies were planned to be pressed on translucent yellow vinyl.

On October 12, 2017, Captured Tracks dropped Calder from their roster following an accusation of sexual assault made against him. The label canceled the album's release, halted physical pressings, and issued refunds for pre-orders. Calder canceled his upcoming tour dates shortly after the label's announcement. In a public statement posted to his social media platforms on October 18, he acknowledged that despite initially assuming otherwise, a 2008 encounter had been claimed as nonconsensual. He issued an apology and announced he was stepping away from his music career to seek counseling.

The album remained shelved until July 2019, when Calder self-released it by uploading the project to his Bandcamp page as a free digital download. The album later surfaced on streaming platforms alongside the rest of Calder's catalog in late 2021.

== Track listing ==
All tracks are written by Alex Calder.

Standard edition (digital)
No.	Title	Length
1.	"Operator"	3:21
2.	"Morning Ritual" (featuring Caroline Levasseur)	2:48
3.	"Noticing Me"	2:20
4.	"Another Day" (featuring Caroline Levasseur)	3:21
5.	"End of Time"	1:13
6.	"Death Beside Me"	4:34
7.	"Sleep Like This"	2:50
8.	"Loosen Up"	2:03
9.	"Slowing Down"	2:41
10.	"Fading Away"	3:23
11.	"Half An Hour" (featuring Garrett Johnson)	3:00
12.	"Goodnight"	3:23

LP pressing (exclusive track)
No.	Title	Length
1.	"Intro" (featuring Jay Weingarten)	0:39
2.	"Operator"	3:21
3.	"Morning Ritual" (featuring Caroline Levasseur)	2:48
4.	"Noticing Me"	2:20
5.	"Another Day" (featuring Caroline Levasseur)	3:21
6.	"End of Time"	1:13
7.	"Death Beside Me"	4:34
8.	"Sleep Like This"	2:50
9.	"Loosen Up"	2:03
10.	"Slowing Down"	2:41
11.	"Fading Away"	3:23
12.	"Half An Hour" (featuring Garrett Johnson)	3:00
13.	"Goodnight"	3:23

Notes

- "Intro" is a spoken word piece featuring Jay Weingarten and was exclusive to the planned LP pressing.
- "Goodnight" is dedicated to Jon Lent and Ryan Boyce.
- The album is dedicated to Graham Calder.

== Personnel ==
Credits adapted from the album's liner notes.

Musicians

- Alex Calder – vocals, instrumentation, songwriting
- Garrett Johnson – featured vocals (track 11)
- Caroline Levasseur – vocals (tracks 2, 4)
- Conor Donaldson – drumming (tracks 2, 9)
- Graham Clyne – synth, string synth (track 4)
- Jay Weingarten – spoken word (LP edition, track 1)

Production and design

- Alex Calder – recording (tracks 3, 5, 7, 8)
- Garrett Johnson – recording (all other tracks)
- Josh Bonati – mastering, vinyl cut
- Jeremy Nischuk – artwork
- Ryan McCardle – design, layout, handlettering
