= Expect the Best =

Studio album by Widowspeak
- Released: August 25, 2017
- Length: 35:32
- Label: Captured Tracks

Widowspeak chronology
| All Yours (2015) | Expect the Best (2017) | Plum (2020) |

Professional ratings
Aggregate scores
| Source | Rating |
|---|---|
| Metacritic | 79/100 |
Review scores
| Source | Rating |
| AllMusic | 4/5 stars |
| The A.V. Club | B |
| Drowned in Sound | 7/10 |

Expect the Best is the fourth studio album by American band Widowspeak. It was released in August 2017 under Captured Tracks.

== Track listing ==
| No. | Title | Length |
|---|---|---|
| 1. | "The Dream" | 4:19 |
| 2. | "When I Tried" | 4:42 |
| 3. | "Dog" | 3:49 |
| 4. | "Warmer" | 3:50 |
| 5. | "Good Sport" | 1:45 |
| 6. | "Let Me" | 3:43 |
| 7. | "Right On" | 2:50 |
| 8. | "Expect the Best" | 3:34 |
| 9. | "Fly on the Wall" | 7:00 |
