= Bend (Alex Calder album) =

2016 compilation album by Alex Calder

Compilation album by Alex Calder
- Released: March 23, 2016 (digital); July 8, 2016 (cassette)
- Recorded: 2013–2015
- Studio: Calder's home
- Genres: Lo-fi; psychedelic pop; bedroom pop
- Length: 46:29
- Labels: Self-released (digital); Captured Tracks (cassette)
- Producer: Alex Calder

Alex Calder chronology
Strange Dreams (2015)	Bend (2016)	Alex Calder (2017)

Bend (stylized in all caps as BEND) is a compilation album by Canadian musician Alex Calder. It was self-released digitally on March 23, 2016, and issued in a limited cassette edition by Captured Tracks on July 8, 2016. Comprising fifteen songs recorded at home between 2013 and 2015, the collection gathers demos and B-sides from the period surrounding his debut album, Strange Dreams (2015). Calder described it as "an in-between album" released while he worked on a planned studio record.

Bend received a 6/10 review from Exclaim!, which praised several tracks as fully realized while finding the collection inconsistent. SLUG Magazine gave the album a favorable review, calling it "twangy, loose and sloppy." In Under the Radar's 2016 artist surveys, John Paul Pitts of Surfer Blood ranked Bend fourth on his year-end list, and C Duncan ranked it eighth.

== Background and recording ==
Following the release of Strange Dreams (2015), which he had recorded alone in his apartment, Calder continued to write and record at home. The songs compiled on Bend were made between 2013 and 2015; the release's Bandcamp description stated simply: "All songs recorded at home by Alex Calder 2013-2015." Exclaim! characterized the release as a collection of B-sides and demos.

In a June 2016 interview with Noise Room, Calder said that "the tape is essentially just a collection of songs that never made it on to proper releases." He described his working method as recording digitally in Ableton with a minimal setup, playing all of the instruments himself, occasionally reusing his own drum tracks, and generally writing songs as he recorded them. The compilation includes an early demo of "Someone," a song that appeared in finished form on Strange Dreams.

== Release ==
Calder released Bend digitally through his Bandcamp page on March 23, 2016. Exclaim! announced the release the same day, embedding an Instagram photograph Calder had posted three days earlier on a skate-themed account, captioned "#sundaysessions," and running the item under the headline "Alex Calder Shares 'BEND' Album, Becomes Viral Skateboarder."

In May 2016, Northern Transmissions featured the track "Shaking My Years Away" as a song of the day, publishing the release's track listing and its 2013–2015 recording span. On June 6, Flaunt announced a cassette edition of the album for a July 8 release. Captured Tracks issued the cassette on July 8, 2016, in a limited edition of 150 copies sold through Bandcamp. Calder supported the release with summer tour dates across the United States and Canada.

On July 15, 2016, Exclaim! premiered a video for the song "Sasaki," which it described as offering "a glimpse into a day in the life of Alex Calder," depicting Calder mowing a lawn, sitting on a balcony, applying lipstick, and playing video games.

== Reception ==
Professional ratings
Review scores
Source	Rating
Exclaim!	6/10

Mackenzie Herd of Exclaim! rated Bend 6/10, viewing the compilation as an insight into Calder's development as a songwriter. She singled out "Dealing With The Sun," "Fade," and "Shaking My Years Away" as fully realized songs, but wrote that "consistency is the missing ingredient on BEND." Alexandra Graber of SLUG Magazine gave the album a favorable review, writing that "Bend is an oasis in the driest of climates. It is twangy, loose and sloppy," and praising its home-recorded rawness, dreamy mood, and relatable lyrics.

In Under the Radar's annual artist surveys, published in early 2017, John Paul Pitts of Surfer Blood placed Bend fourth on his list of the best albums of 2016, while C Duncan placed it eighth on his.

== Aftermath ==
In October 2017, Captured Tracks dropped Calder from its roster and canceled his planned second album following a sexual assault allegation against him. Pitchfork reported that the label intended to remove Calder's catalog from streaming services, noting releases including 2016's Bend. Calder subsequently continued issuing archival home recordings independently, self-releasing the Mold Boy LP of songs recorded in his mid-teens.

== Track listing ==
All tracks are written by Alex Calder.

No.	Title	Length
1.	"Foam"	2:50
2.	"Out of Tune"	2:32
3.	"Sasaki"	2:28
4.	"Someone (Early Demo)"	4:48
5.	"Out of Touch"	2:48
6.	"Wire Way"	2:52
7.	"Real Life"	3:16
8.	"Bend"	1:29
9.	"Paralyzed"	4:08
10.	"Goodbye"	2:08
11.	"Born In Another Time"	4:19
12.	"Dealing With The Sun"	3:54
13.	"Fade"	3:12
14.	"Great Ideas"	2:36
15.	"Shaking My Years Away"	3:09
Total length:		46:29

Notes

- The cassette edition split the collection across two sides, with tracks 1–8 on side A and tracks 9–15 on side B.
- "Someone (Early Demo)" is an early version of "Someone," from Strange Dreams (2015).

== Personnel ==
- Alex Calder – vocals, all instruments, recording, production
