= En mí =

En mí may refer to:

- "En mí", a song by Marilina Bertoldi
- "En mí", a song by J Balvin from Vibras
- "En mí (interlude)", a song by J Balvin from Vibras
- "En mí", a song by Juan Wauters
