= Craft Spells =

American indie rock/dream pop band

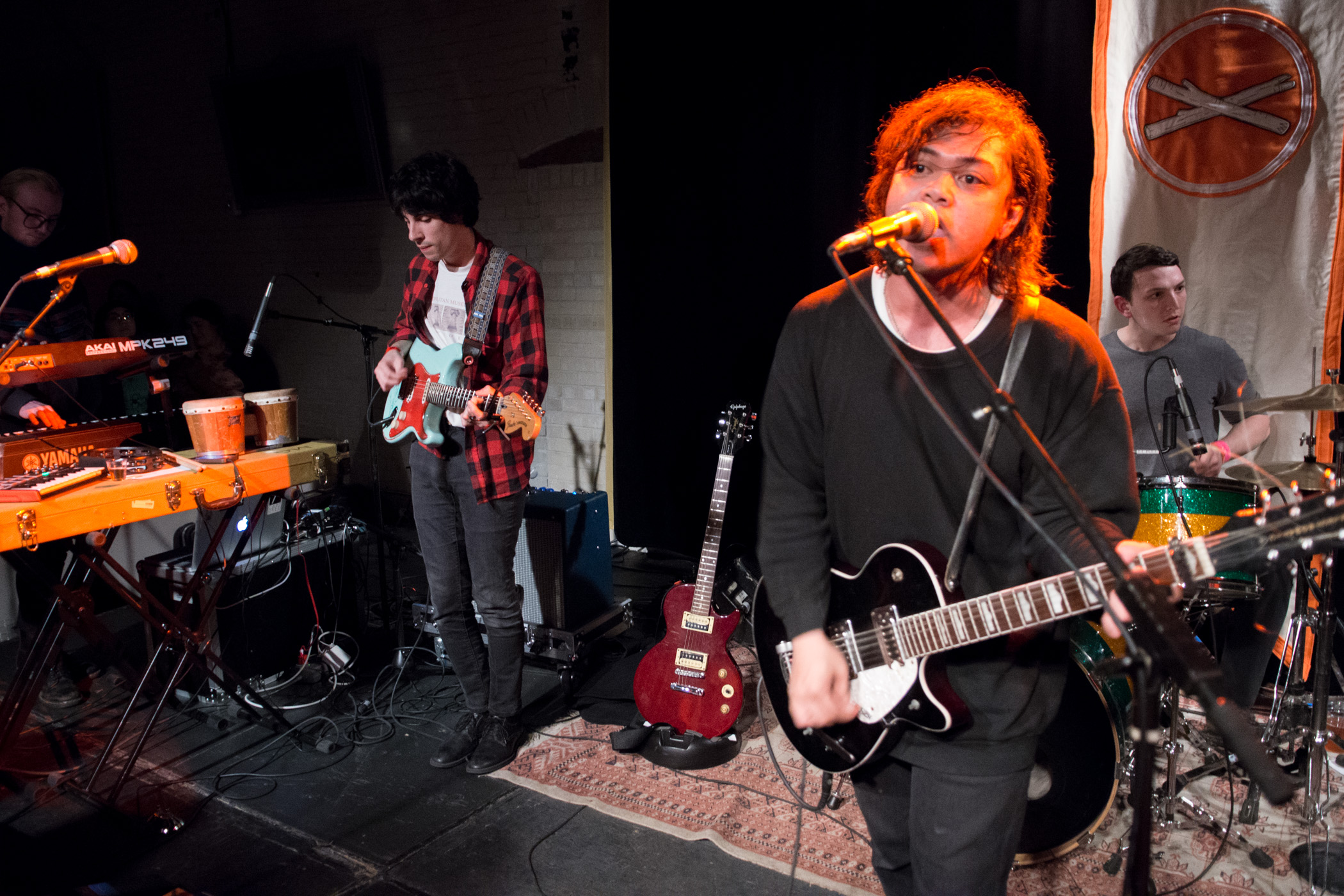

Background information
- Origin: Lathrop, California, USA
- Genres: Indie rock, indie pop, dream pop, synthpop
- Years active: 2009–present
- Label: Captured Tracks
- Members: Justin Vallesteros; Live members: Brandon Hughes; Javier Suarez; Cameron Spencer Case; Nick Robins
- Past members: Live members: Brock Lowry; Andy Lum; Frankie Soto; Jack Doyle Smith; Peter Michel
- Website: www.craftspells.com

Craft Spells is an American indie rock/dream pop band from Stockton, California, formed in late 2009 by Justin Vallesteros. To date, Craft Spells has released two studio albums, Idle Labor (2011) and Nausea (2014) on the Captured Tracks label.

== History ==
In 2009 Vallesteros began experimenting with simple synth and guitar lines, gradually layering them to create the sound that would become Craft Spells. After signing with Captured Tracks, the band released their debut full-length, Idle Labor, in early 2011 and went on tour with Beach Fossils. The album was described as a soft, synthy, dreamy compendium of new wave music and 80s pop similar to New Order with Vallesteros' voice style sounding like Ian Curtis.

The band's next EP, Gallery, was released on 2012. It was followed by their second LP, Nausea on 2014.

== Discography ==
Studio albums

- Idle Labor (2011)
- Nausea (2014)

EPs

- Gallery (2012)
- Gruesome Flowers 2: A Tribute to The Wake (2012) (with Blouse)
- Midnight Render (Nausea Rebuild) (2016)

Singles

- Party Talk (2010)
- After the Moment (2011)
- Breaking the Angle Against the Tide (2014)
- Our Park by Night (2015)
