= Plum (Widowspeak album) =

Studio album by Widowspeak
- Released: 28 August 2020
- Recorded: Winter 2019
- Length: 39:07
- Label: Captured Tracks
- Producer: Robert Earl Thomas

Widowspeak chronology
Expect the Best (2017)	Plum (2020)	The Jacket (2022)

Singles from Plum
- 1. "Breadwinner" Released: 27 May 2020; 2. "Money" Released: 23 June 2020; 3. "Plum" Released: 14 July 2020; 4. "Even True Love" Released: 5 August 2020

Plum is the fifth studio album by American band Widowspeak. It was released on 28 August 2020 on record label Captured Tracks. Plum was recorded in the Catskill Mountains in the winter of 2019, and was preceded by four singles: "Breadwinner" in May 2020, "Money" in June, "Plum" in July, and "Even True Love" in August.

== Critical reception ==
Professional ratings
Aggregate scores
Source	Rating
Metacritic	79/100
Review scores
Source	Rating
AllMusic	4/5 stars
Beats Per Minute	73%
Loud and Quiet	8/10
MusicOMH	3/5 stars
No Ripcord	8/10
Pitchfork	7.2/10

Metacritic summarised the critical response to Plum as "generally favorable." Todd Dedman of Beats Per Minute wrote that Widowspeak's "sound remains a woozy delight, but with a more direct and purposeful feel to it," but felt that the title track is one of the weakest on the album. Loud and Quiet wrote: "there's a rumbling, phantom thread in the strata of Plum that elevates their fifth effort to a vantage point above their previous releases," and compared Hamilton's vocals to Hope Sandoval of Mazzy Star. In a review for Pitchfork, Julia Gray wrote that Plum "doesn’t take enough risks to really widen Widowspeak's scope."

== Track listing ==
All tracks are written by Widowspeak.

No.	Title	Length
1.	"Plum"	4:24
2.	"The Good Ones"	4:38
3.	"Money"	4:53
4.	"Breadwinner"	4:09
5.	"Even True Love"	4:46
6.	"Amy"	4:03
7.	"Sure Thing"	3:07
8.	"Jeanie"	4:28
9.	"Y2K"	4:39
Total length:		39:07

== Personnel ==
Widowspeak

- Molly Hamilton – vocals, guitar
- Robert Earl Thomas – guitar, bass, synth, drum machine, loops

Other credits

- Sam Griffin Owens – bass (tracks 1, 5, 7), synth (tracks 1, 4, 8, 9)
- Michael Hess – piano (tracks 2, 6, 9)
- Andy Weaver – drums

Technical

- Robert Earl Thomas – production
- Sam Griffin Owens – mixing (track 1)
- Ali Chant – mixing (tracks 2–9)
