= The White Widow =

The White Widow may refer to:

- Samantha Lewthwaite (born 1983), Islamic State terrorist suspect and widow of London tube bomber Germaine Lindsay
- Sally-Anne Jones (1968-2017), English-born terrorist and propagandist for the Islamic State

== See also ==
- White widow (disambiguation)
