= Tullgren =

Tullgren may refer to:

== People ==
- Albert Tullgren (1874–1958), Swedish entomologist
- Herbert W. Tullgren (1889–1944), American architect
- Lina Tullgren, American musician

== Other uses ==
- Tullgren funnel, entomology equipment
