= Alan Barry =

Alan or Allan Barry may refer to:

- Allan Barry (born 1930), American football player
- Alan Barry, musician in Fields (progressive rock band)
- Alan Barry is an Italo disco alias-act of an Italian band that was produced by The Saifam Group.

== See also ==
- Barry Allen (disambiguation)
