= Widow's Peak =

A widow's peak is a V-shaped point in the hairline in the center of the forehead.

Widow's Peak may also refer to:

- Widows' Peak, a 1994 British-Irish film
- Widowspeak, an American band
  - Widowspeak (Widowspeak album), 2011
- Widowspeak (Lydia Lunch album), 1998
- "The Widows Peak" (song), a 2007 song by Dashboard Confessional
- Gory neckbreaker, also known as the Widow's Peak, a professional wrestling move

== See also ==
- The Girl with the Widow's Peak, a 2014 memoir by Lady Ursula d'Abo
