= Free Cell (album) =

Studio album by Lina Tullgren
- Released: August 23, 2019
- Genres: indie rock; indie pop
- Length: 41:37
- Label: Captured Tracks

Lina Tullgren chronology
Won (2017)	Free Cell (2019)

Free Cell is the second album by American musician Lina Tullgren, released on August 23, 2019, on Captured Tracks.

== Critical reception ==
Professional ratings
Review scores
Source	Rating
AllMusic	4/5 stars
Pitchfork	7.3/10

Free Cell received positive contemporary reviews. Emma Madden at Pitchfork said, "the Queens musician's second album uses avant-pop songwriting to capture the nuances of tedium, to strangely captivating effect". In a review for AllMusic, Timothy Monger compared the album favourably with its predecessor, saying, "Artistically, Tullgren shows a remarkable amount of growth between releases, making for a sophomore gem".

== Track listing ==
All tracks are written by Lina Tulgren.

No.	Title	Length
1.	"Free Cell"	4:11
2.	"110717"	4:06
3.	"Golden Babyland"	3:47
4.	"Bad at Parties"	2:41
5.	"Saiddone"
6.	"Soft Glove 1"	3:55
7.	"Glowing x10000"	4:00
8.	"Wow, Lucky"	2:29
9.	"Soft Again"	3:07
10.	"Nervous Yet"	4:00
11.	"Soft Glove 2"	3:39
12.	"Piano"	3:10
Total length:		41:37
