= Mvd Luv =

Studio album by Juan Wauters
- Released: June 27, 2025
- Genre: Folk-pop
- Length: 26:55
- Label: Captured Tracks
- Producer: Leandro Aquistapacie

Juan Wauters chronology
| Wandering Rebel (2023) | Mvd Luv (2025) |

Singles from Mvd Luv
- 1. "If It's Not Luv" Released: April 10, 2025

Mvd Luv is the seventh studio album by singer-songwriter and guitarist Juan Wauters. It was released on June 27, 2025, via Captured Tracks in LP, CD and digital formats.

== Background ==
The album was recorded in Montevideo, Uruguay, the birthplace of Wauters, and co-produced by Leandro Aquistapacie. It also features instrumental contributions from Mateo Ottonello and Cecilia "Checha" Rodrígues.

Mvd Luv's lead single, "If It's Not Luv", was released on April 10, 2025.

== Reception ==
Professional ratings
Review scores
| Source | Rating |
|---|---|
| AllMusic | 4/5 stars |
| Financial Times | 4/5 stars |
| Mojo | 4/5 stars |
| Under the Radar | 6/10 stars |

Victoria Segal of Mojo assigned the album a rating of four stars, noting it as "a wistful prodding at Wauters' roots in the place he left for New York when he was 18."

Describing Wauters as being "genuinely inspired" in incorporating the culture of Montevideo into his music, AllMusic remarked, it "gives MVD LUV its inherent sweetness and makes it more than just another album of happy-go-lucky folk-pop numbers."

Under the Radar gave it a rating of six out of ten, describing it as feeling "like a pop-folk documentary" and "exciting, but a bit rushed." Financial Times rated the project four stars and described it as "an album that is charming, light and short."

== Track listing ==
Mvd Luv track listing
| No. | Title | Length |
|---|---|---|
| 1. | "Amor Montevideo" | 0:49 |
| 2. | "If It's Not Luv" | 1:42 |
| 3. | "Manejando Por Pando" | 2:38 |
| 4. | "Acting Like I Don't Know" | 1:02 |
| 5. | "Canción Mamá" | 2:00 |
| 6. | "Dime Amiga" | 2:15 |
| 7. | "La Lucía" | 4:20 |
| 8. | "Mutuación" | 2:37 |
| 9. | "Niño" | 1:39 |
| 10. | "Get A Habit" | 0:58 |
| 11. | "Aeropuerto" | 2:04 |
| 12. | "Lonely By Myself" | 1:14 |
| 13. | "Ando Con Miedo" | 2:22 |
| 14. | "Siempre Vuelven" | 1:15 |
| Total length: | | 26:55 |

== Personnel ==
Credits for Mvd Luv adapted from Bandcamp.

- Juan Wauters – all instruments, arrangement, production, recording, mixing, mastering, songwriting
- Abril Pereira Beasley – backing vocals
- Camilo Ottonello – bombo
- Cecilia Rodríguez – sax, flute
- Juan Branaa – drum recording (on "Mutuación")
- Julia Somma – bombo legüero
- Leandro Aquistapacie – all instruments, arrangement, production, recording
- Manuel Silva Abelino – tambor repique
- Mateo Alvarez – tambor piano
- Mateo Ottonello – hand percussions, snare, tambores, tambor chico, tambor piano, tambor repique, redoblante, drums
- Nicolás Demczylo – mixing, mastering
- Renzo Quartino – platos
- Santiago Silva – tambor repique
