= Play Music =

Play Music may refer to:

- Google Play Music, a music and podcast streaming service and an online music locker operated by Google
- Play Music (album), a 2008 album by Thieves Like Us
- Play Music Today, a musical instrument retailer
