= The Beets =

Indie rock group

The Beets were an indie rock/punk rock group from Queens, New York, signed to the Hardly Art label. The band was led by Uruguayan-born Juan Wauters and also included bassist Jose Garcia, and drummer/vocalist Jacob Warstler. Other incarnations included bassist Tall Juan Zaballa drummer/vocalist Melissa Scaduto, and drummer/vocalist Chie Mori. Matthew Volz worked as the band's official artist, providing hand-painted banners and unique light shows.

The Beets have opened for Pavement, Vivian Girls, and the Mountain Goats.

== Discography ==
=== Albums ===
- Spit On the Face Of People Who Don't Want to Be Cool - (self-release, 2009)
- Let the Poison Out - (Hardly Art, 2010)
- Stay Home - (Captured Tracks, 2011)

=== Singles and EPs ===
- "Don't Fit In My Head/"It's Okay to Lose" (Captured Tracks, 2009)
- The Beets/Cassie Ramone - (Split release EP with Cassie Ramone, Psychic Lunch, 2010)
- "Pick Another Corner"/"Time Brought Age" - (Captured Tracks, 2011)
- "Silver Nickels and Golden Dimes"/"Psychedelic Bee" (Hardly Art, 2013)
