= Alex Calder (musician) =

Canadian musician (1989–2026)

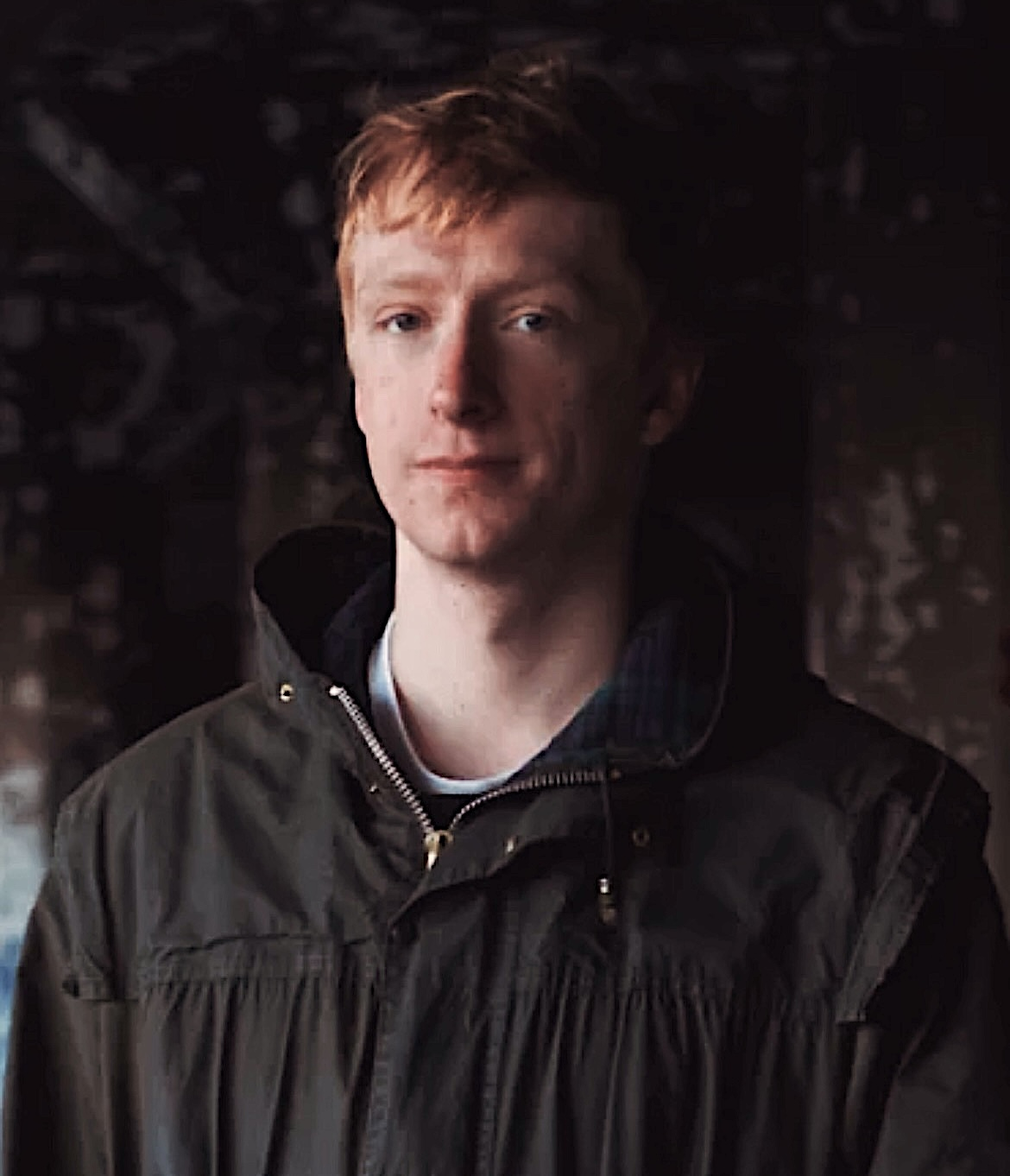
- Calder in 2015

Background information
- Also known as: Mold Boy; Collage Party
- Born: Alexander Calder; January 23, 1989; Edmonton, Alberta, Canada
- Origin: Edmonton, Alberta, Canada
- Died: March 4, 2026 (aged 37) Montreal, Quebec, Canada
- Genres: Lo-fi; indie rock; psychedelic pop; slacker rock
- Occupations: Musician; songwriter
- Instruments: Vocals; guitar; bass; drums; synthesizer
- Years active: 2008–2017, 2021–2026
- Label: Captured Tracks
- Website: alexcalder.net

Alexander Calder (January 23, 1989 – March 4, 2026), known professionally as Alex Calder, was a Canadian singer-songwriter, multi-instrumentalist and comedian. He came to prominence in the late 2000s as the drummer for Makeout Videotape, the Vancouver lo-fi project of Mac DeMarco, and from 2013 released hazy psychedelic pop under his own name through the Brooklyn label Captured Tracks.

Captured Tracks released his debut EP Time (2013), his first full-length album Strange Dreams (2015) and a cassette of home recordings, Bend (2016). He also issued a large body of work as Mold Boy and Collage Party, including a 2015 Record Store Day collection of his earliest solo recordings.

In October 2017, Captured Tracks dropped Calder and cancelled his second album following an accusation of sexual assault. He addressed the claim as an earnest miscommunication and apologized in a public statement, subsequently retiring from music for several years while continuing to maintain a low profile on social media.

In November 2021, Calder made a quiet return by republishing his catalog via digital streaming platforms, alongside other archival material. Calder released what would become his final recordings in the first half of 2022: the singles “Big Day”, “Slide”, and “I Am Glue”, for an uncompleted EP, Big Day. He died at his home in Montreal in March 2026, at the age of 37.

== Early life ==
Alexander Calder was born on January 23, 1989, in Edmonton, Alberta. His parents were, in his description, "hippies" who filled the house with records by the Beatles and other 1960s acts, and he called himself "fully a Beatles kid". His mother ran an Edmonton thrift store called Red Pony, where Calder worked for about four years and found much of his clothing.

Calder was put into classical guitar lessons as a small child and studied the instrument for years. He said in 2015 that he began at five or six and kept at it into his early teens, when he abandoned classical technique for metal, blues and guitar solos in the manner of Stevie Ray Vaughan. He later said he had considered studying music formally before deciding it was not for him, and that he had been "born into it, with a musical family and friends".

He started writing and recording his own material around 2005. In a 2015 interview with Dustin Payseur, he described himself at that age as "a very isolated teenager" whose only friend was a schoolmate named Jared, and recalled a long phase of long hair, polyester shirts and cowboy boots, and an obsession with the 2001 film Blow that led the pair to carry an empty suitcase everywhere. During high school he met fellow Edmonton native Mac DeMarco, and the two formed a jokey bar-rock band called the Meat Cleavers that mostly wrote songs about their hometown. Calder described that material as "all collaborative and really stupid, like all joke songs", and said he was recording on his own throughout.

Calder shared his name with the American sculptor Alexander Calder; asked about the sculptor's work in 2013, he said he had never paid attention to it.

== Career ==
=== 2008–2011: Makeout Videotape ===
Calder moved to Vancouver around 2008, where he and DeMarco began playing together. The project had begun as DeMarco's recording alias in Edmonton, and Calder described it as "always Mac's thing", with his own role that of drummer at live shows. DeMarco recorded the 2009 EP Heat Wave! alone in his Vancouver garage, and for performances Calder and Jenn Clement, billed as Alex Van Flip and Jenn Twinn Pube, alternated on drums, with Clement covering when Calder was unavailable. Clement also played in the Vancouver punk band Puberty.

The project signed to Unfamiliar Records in late 2009 and toured with labelmates Japandroids. Calder later recalled "a lot of good times" with DeMarco, "being really gross and dirty and poor all over the country". In Vancouver he supported himself with restaurant and retail work, including a stretch washing dishes about fifty hours a week, and later several spells at American Apparel, where he passed shifts playing SimAnt. He also appeared as the female lead in the music video for the Makeout Videotape song "Only You".

Calder remained the project's live drummer through the 2010 album Ying Yang and the CD-R releases around it, which were assembled largely from DeMarco's home recordings. A Discorder feature that year noted the pair's stand-up kit of floor tom and snare. By 2011 DeMarco had moved to Montreal and was recording under his own name; Calder described the end of the group as breaking up "as a band and a couple".

=== 2011–2012: Collage Party and first solo recordings ===
After the project wound down, Calder returned to Edmonton and began writing and recording alone, at first without any plan to release the results. He posted songs to Bandcamp as Collage Party, later saying that he had mainly wanted friends to hear them and was pleased if anyone else did.

A second alias, Mold Boy, followed. Calder presented it as an outlet for longer and more experimental recordings, and said he had started it partly as "a bit of a legal thing" that let him release music freely while keeping his identity secret. The secrecy did not last, by his own account: he quickly tired of nobody hearing the material and attached his name to it. By 2014 he described the two names as effectively interchangeable, with Mold Boy mostly a way of feeling less self-conscious. He also released a five-track digital set under the name Fatal Relay in September 2014.

Calder's songs reached Captured Tracks through DeMarco, who passed the Collage Party recordings to the label's founder Mike Sniper. Sniper signed Calder himself rather than a DeMarco side project, and one contemporary write-up noted that the label "recognized that Makeout Videotape was a two-man operation of balanced parts". After signing, Calder retired the Collage Party name and released under his own, while Mold Boy continued alongside.

=== 2013–2015: Time, Strange Dreams and Mold Boy ===
Calder moved to Montreal around the middle of 2012 and completed most of his debut EP there. Time (2013) was a seven-song record made in his living room, with several songs carried over from Edmonton demos recorded with his friend Jon Lent. Its lead single "Suki and Me" was written about a childhood pet cat, and Calder called it an exercise in nostalgia for being a child. Reviews were generally positive and most singled out "Suki and Me"; Pitchfork described his voice as "just on the other side of exhausted". AllMusic heard "very catchy pop songs" in the vein of labelmates Beach Fossils and DeMarco.

His debut album Strange Dreams (2015) grew out of the same period: about half of it was written before Time appeared, and he recorded it across two Montreal apartments. Frustrated that the label had no release date for it, he uploaded an unmastered version to Bandcamp in May 2014, then took it down when Captured Tracks scheduled a physical release and spent the intervening months reworking several tracks. The eleven-song album appeared on January 20, 2015, preceded by the single "Lola".

Strange Dreams drew generally favourable notices, many of which objected to the way he was introduced. Exclaim! called it an impressive collage of experimentation, rock and pop influences that undid any parallel with DeMarco, while Under the Radar argued that the "Mac DeMarco collaborator" framing placed him unjustly in DeMarco's shadow and compared its blurred eras to Deerhunter's Cryptograms and Microcastle. AllMusic's Tim Sendra found it "a much murkier, far more mysterious affair" than the EP and praised Calder's "courage to subvert his skill set in an interesting way". Now highlighted the "jangly, acid-tinged tracks" and his "precise ear for pop ingenuity", while noting that his vocals sometimes sat too far back in the mix. Northern Transmissions called the songwriting strong enough to stand outside DeMarco's shadow, and others compared his delivery to Bradford Cox. Caitlin Loney of the Montreal band Freelove Fenner sang on "Life Purpose".

In April 2015, Captured Tracks collected the Mold Boy recordings of 2010 to 2013 as the fourteen-track Mold Boy (2015), a limited vinyl release for Record Store Day with artwork by Sebastian Mejias. Exclaim! named it the best thing in that year's Record Store Day slate. Over the summer he toured the United States with Surfer Blood; the run ended in June when his bassist Thomas Holmes was struck by a car in Los Angeles and suffered broken ribs and fractured vertebrae, prompting Calder to cancel the remaining dates and launch a fundraiser. Later that year he joined DeMarco for a six-week North American tour.

=== 2016: Bend, covers and collaborations ===
Calder issued a self-released covers EP in early 2016 with versions of songs by Björk, the Breeders and Stereolab. That spring he announced Bend (2016), fifteen home recordings made between 2013 and 2015, describing it as an in-between album made while he worked on a studio record and the first project he had not recorded at home. It appeared digitally on July 8, 2016, and was later given a limited cassette release.

Calder told The Noise Room that the set gathered songs which had never found a place on a proper release, some of them unfinished or early versions of released songs, and that he had played every instrument, in places reusing drum tracks from his own earlier recordings. Exclaim! thought "Dealing With The Sun", "Fade" and the single "Shaking My Years Away" were fully realised, but concluded that consistency was the collection's missing ingredient; Slug Magazine noted its effortless dream-pop quality. In November 2016 he and Homeshake's Peter Sagar released a split charity single, Calder's "Stuck Inside" backed with "Nankhatai", with proceeds going to the International Refugee Assistance Project.

=== 2017: Unreleased second album and withdrawal ===
On August 3, 2017, Captured Tracks announced a self-titled second album for October 20, led by the single "Morning Ritual", which featured Caroline Levasseur. Much of it was recorded at the studio of his friend Garrett Johnson rather than at home, and Levasseur also appeared on "Another Day". Calder called the record "sad clown music" and cited the films of Paul Thomas Anderson, Kate Bush and the soundtracks of EarthBound and The Legend of Zelda: Ocarina of Time among its reference points. Austin Town Hall described "Morning Ritual" as moving between bouncing guitar licks and softer moments.

The album never appeared. On October 13, 2017, in the same week as several similar allegations against musicians, Captured Tracks said that an allegation of sexual assault had been made against Calder, that it was no longer working with him, that the album would not be released and that pre-orders would be refunded. The label withdrew his back catalogue and cancelled a release show at Sunnyvale in Brooklyn, and Pitchfork noted that the Time EP had been removed from the label's SoundCloud.

Calder responded on October 18 with a statement describing an incident in 2008 that he had wrongly believed to be consensual. He wrote that the encounter "did not meet the criteria for getting consent", apologised for the shame and isolation the other person had experienced, and said he had been protected from accountability by a community that had prioritised his account over hers. He put his music career and "all creative pursuits" on hold to attend counselling and consent training.

=== 2021–2026: Archival releases ===
From 2021 Calder republished his catalogue on streaming services and began issuing archival material himself, including a run of Mold Boy collections and EPs, the demos set Half an Hour, and the compilations Collage Party (2020) and Pleated (2022). He released the singles "Slide" and "Big Day" in July 2022 and "I Am Glue" that October, recorded at home in Montreal and mastered by Christian Rowell, both billed as coming from a planned EP titled Big Day. The shelved self-titled album also surfaced on streaming services, and a retrospective review found it darker and harder to pin down than his earlier work.

== Artistry ==
=== Musical style ===
Calder's records were generally described as a lo-fi, bedroom-pop take on the Beach Boys, and Interview heard his debut album drawing on the Beatles, the Beach Boys, Hall & Oates and Prince. He named Stereolab as one of his favourite bands, alongside Pavement, Arthur Russell, Yo La Tengo, Women, Panda Bear, Deerhunter, Emitt Rhodes, Ariel Pink's Haunted Graffiti and Steely Dan's Can't Buy a Thrill. Reviewers linked his hazier work to Deerhunter and Atlas Sound, and Under the Radar called him something of a post-Deerhunter songwriter.

He said that for Strange Dreams he wanted to write songs that sounded like Pavement, and that the earlier EP was warblier because he had been using cheap effect pedals. His indistinct vocal delivery was partly a preference: he held up Panda Bear's Person Pitch as a record where the words are unintelligible but the singing still works, while admitting he was not much of a singer.

=== Recording ===
Calder recorded almost everything himself, usually late at night, and generally wrote as he recorded rather than composing in advance. He started with a guitar part and left lyrics until last because that was the part he felt least confident about. He preferred first takes and argued that re-recording stripped the edge from a performance.

His setup was minimal and shrank over time. In 2013 he ran a sixteen-channel Fostex mixer into Ableton as an interface to keep some analogue warmth, with a Roland condenser microphone and a few SM57s on drums. By 2016 he had sold most of his gear and recorded Bend in Ableton with condenser mics and 57s, using a Roland DR-80C for most of it. After neighbours complained about drum noise in his second Montreal apartment, he began using sampled drums, including samples of his own playing.

He used Bandcamp to test material in public rather than to present finished work, valuing the immediacy it allowed a fast and loose songwriter. He also said his output came in waves, with fallow months followed by bursts of songs.

=== Videos and online presence ===
Calder made deliberately cheap-looking videos, using VHS cameras, green screens and tape distortion to disorient the viewer. For Time he made a retro-styled clip for "Light Leave Your Eyes" that set the visual tone, and Jason Harvey directed the video for "Fatal Delay". For "Lola" he and his friend Cole Kush filmed him rollerblading shirtless and grinning through a downbeat song, a joke aimed at the hazy VHS melancholy audiences expected.

He ran a series of deliberately silly Instagram accounts, among them one devoted to photographs of people in bathtubs, one of daily impersonations of Quentin Tarantino and one documenting his own skating, and he posted short films and recipe videos to YouTube. By 2016 he had cycled through seven accounts and had several banned. He treated the platforms as a joke rather than a promotional tool, describing his persona as closer to parody than self-expression and enjoying that people read it the wrong way.

He was also a comic presence on stage early in his solo career, sometimes alienating audiences with running jokes such as repeated plays of the theme from King of the Hill, before tightening the live show.

== Personal life and death ==
Calder lived in Montreal for most of his solo career and said its cheap rent let him avoid full-time work. He was a keen pinball player who favoured the AC/DC table, complained that Montreal was the worst city in the world to play pinball because a law treating the machines as illegal gambling had never been repealed there, and named Sunshine Laundry in Brooklyn as his favourite venue. He hosted increasingly competitive poker nights with friends in Montreal.

He cooked seriously and ran a food site called Alex Calder Eats, describing himself in social media bios as a chef and culinary student. He also pursued acting work, named Adam Sandler and Mike Myers as influences, and appeared as an extra in a low-budget film shot in Montreal. Asked about favourite dishes, he named borscht, chimichurri and poutine.

He shared his Montreal apartment with his girlfriend Lindsay and a cat named Jason. He kept an irregular "two sleeps" schedule, going to bed around four in the morning, waking to watch films and sleeping again, and said he worked best in the quiet hours. He experienced frequent sleep paralysis and joked that his debut album was a concept record about it.

=== Death ===
Calder died at home in Montreal on March 4, 2026, at the age of 37; no cause of death was disclosed. His death was confirmed on April 3, 2026, by his friend and manager Christian Rowell in a statement on Calder's Bandcamp page, which said that he had been working on new music and that an EP of his final unfinished songs would follow. Archival releases continued after his death, including the album Mold Boy: Conception in July 2026.

== Discography ==
=== Studio albums ===
- Strange Dreams (2015)
- Alex Calder (2017; unreleased)

=== Compilation and demo releases ===
● Mold Boy (2015)

| No. | Title | Length |
|---|---|---|
| 1. | "Intro" | 2:04 |
| 2. | "Rewind My Mind" | 3:29 |
| 3. | "Moving Slow" | 2:20 |
| 4. | "Disease Freak" | 3:10 |
| 5. | "Carlito" | 2:14 |
| 6. | "Years" | 1:29 |
| 7. | "Boil" | 2:01 |
| 8. | "Take a Dip" | 2:49 |
| 9. | "Lost My Day" | 3:01 |
| 10. | "Living in Motion" | 2:13 |
| 11. | "Microscopic" | 3:10 |
| 12. | "The Hum" | 2:37 |
| 13. | "Fidelio" | 3:16 |
| 14. | "New World Focus" | 3:05 |
| Total length: | | 37:05 |

- Bend (2016)

● Collage Party (2020)

| No. | Title | Length |
|---|---|---|
| 1. | "Someone" | 1:32 |
| 2. | "Light Leave Your Eyes (Demo)" | 3:05 |
| 3. | "Leaving" | 2:47 |
| 4. | "I Am Legend" | 2:42 |
| 5. | "Feel Alright" | 2:13 |
| 6. | "Time (Demo)" | 1:50 |
| 7. | "Limousine" | 2:24 |
| 8. | "Pleated" | 1:30 |
| 9. | "Psychedelic Chemistry" | 3:14 |
| 10. | "White Way Amazon" | 2:52 |
| Total length: | | 24:19 |

● Pleated (2022)

| No. | Title | Length |
|---|---|---|
| 1. | "Pleated" | 1:30 |
| 2. | "Sun Will Rise" | 4:06 |
| 3. | "Melting Moon" | 3:42 |
| 4. | "Don't Be So Cool" | 2:42 |
| 5. | "My Sweatshirt" | 3:06 |
| 6. | "Keep What I Want" | 2:27 |
| 7. | "Bodhi ZoSo" | 2:24 |
| 8. | "Woo Song" | 3:15 |
| Total length: | | 23:45 |

=== Extended plays ===
- Time (2013)
- Fatal Relay (2014, digital)
- Covers (2016)
- Big Day (announced 2022; unreleased)
