= Locate S,1 =

American musician

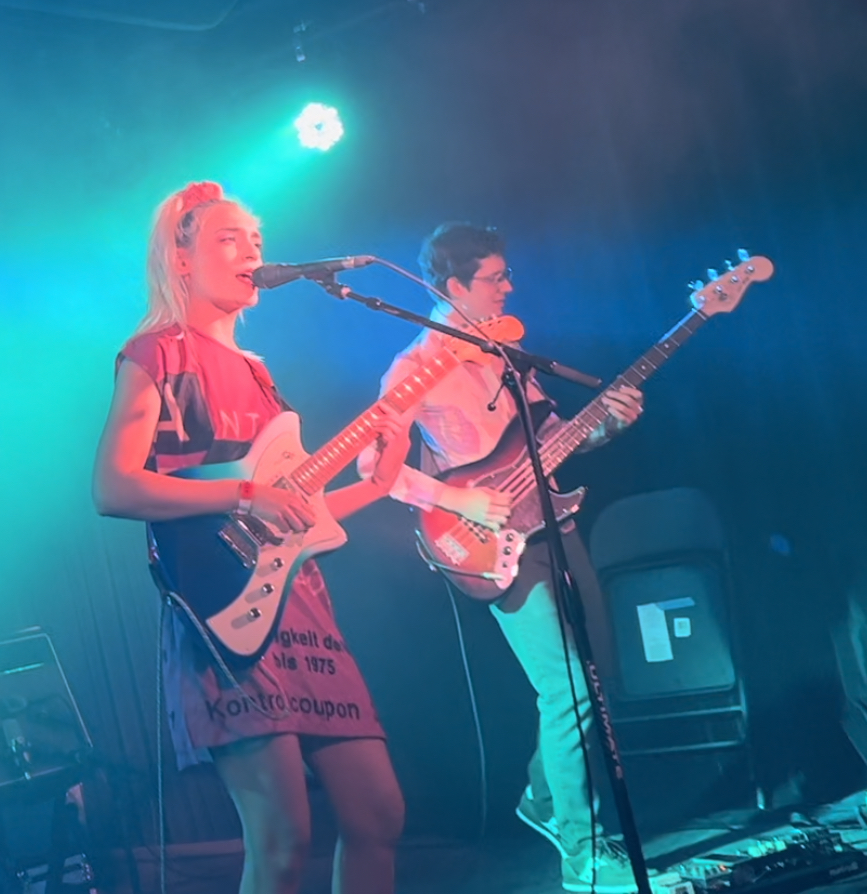
- Locate S,1 performing in Seattle in 2023

Background information
- Years active: 2018–present
- Label: Captured Tracks
- Members: Christina Schneider

Locate S,1 is the stage name of the American musician Christina Schneider.

== Profile ==
Schneider began her career as a musician with projects including C.E Schneider Topical, Christina Schneider's Genius Grant, and Jepeto Solutions. In 2018, Schneider began making music under the moniker Locate S,1. Schneider released her first album under that name the same year, titled Healing Contest. The album was produced by Kevin Barnes of of Montreal. In 2020, Schneider released her second album as Locate S,1 titled Personalia, via Captured Tracks.

In July 2023, the third album under the Locate S,1 name, Wicked Jaw, was released by Captured Tracks.

== Discography ==
Studio albums

- Healing Contest, 2018
- Personalia, 2020 (Captured Tracks)
- Wicked Jaw, 2023 (Captured Tracks)
