= The Snap Elect =

English rock group

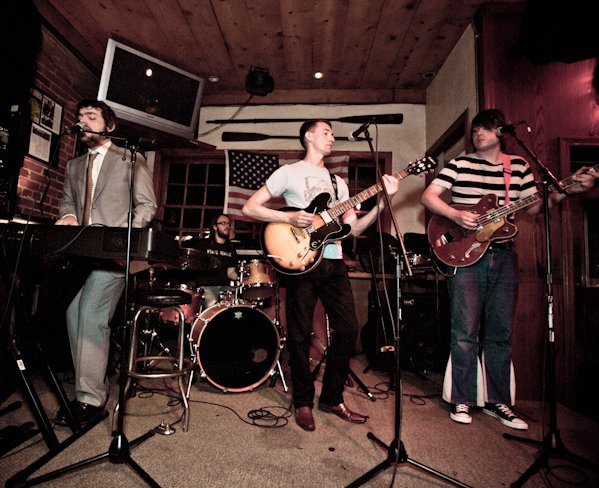
- The Snap Elect performing in Laguna Beach, 2011

Background information
- Origin: London, United Kingdom
- Genres: Pop rock; Psychedelic rock
- Years active: 2009—2011
- Labels: Pure Groove, Smashed Records
- Past members: Paul Milne – Bass, vocals Barry Allan – Drums, vocals Tom Duffin – Guitar, vocals Nic Denholm – Piano, organ, saxophone, vocals

The Snap Elect were a London-based four member pop rock band. Their music is described by critics as a combination of melodic power pop and psychedelic rock.

== History ==
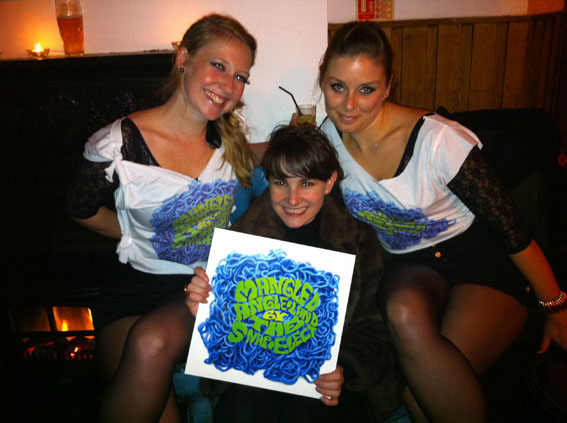
Karrie Fransman holding a vinyl of Mangled Angle Land with fans Tash (left) and Britt (right)

The group formed in 2009; it included former members of Glasgow bands Uncle John & Whitelock and The Needles. They released one album, Mangled Angle Land in 2010, which was recorded on reel-to-reel tape at Redchurch Recordings in Hackney with sound engineer Freddy "machete" Baggs and later-added digital overdubs. The album cover was designed and handmade by comic book artist Karrie Fransman using felt and wool. Dignan Porch and The Plimptons supported at their album launch at The George Tavern.

The album launch doubled as the bands last UK gig, which one review called "a crazy shame — but at the same time somehow cool as f**k". The group reunited briefly in California the following year. Paul went on to form garage/psych outfit The Magnetic Mind, Tom joined live electronica group Machine Heaven Ranger and Barry toured with The Doors Alive, a Doors tribute act. Nic formed the LA-based Count Downfall and the Dreadful Plot.

== Critical reception ==
"The band certainly feel in touch with the mysterious ways of the Floyd, but zap you like a can of Jolt cola now and then, switching the speed without warning and introducing a kind of Goodies-style frantic humour to proceedings."
– Review of Mangled Angle Land, Artrocker

The band were included in Vic Galloway’s 50 Scottish artists to watch in 2011, received national radio play on BBC Radio 1 and BBC 6Music with Tom Robinson.

The music was described as "Love-inspired acid pop" and Ray Davies-esque with "sonic harmonies" akin to Steeleye Span. Five years after disbanding one posthumous review concluded that, had they received mainstream support, "maybe this band would be gracing the cover of Classic Rock today."

== Live ==
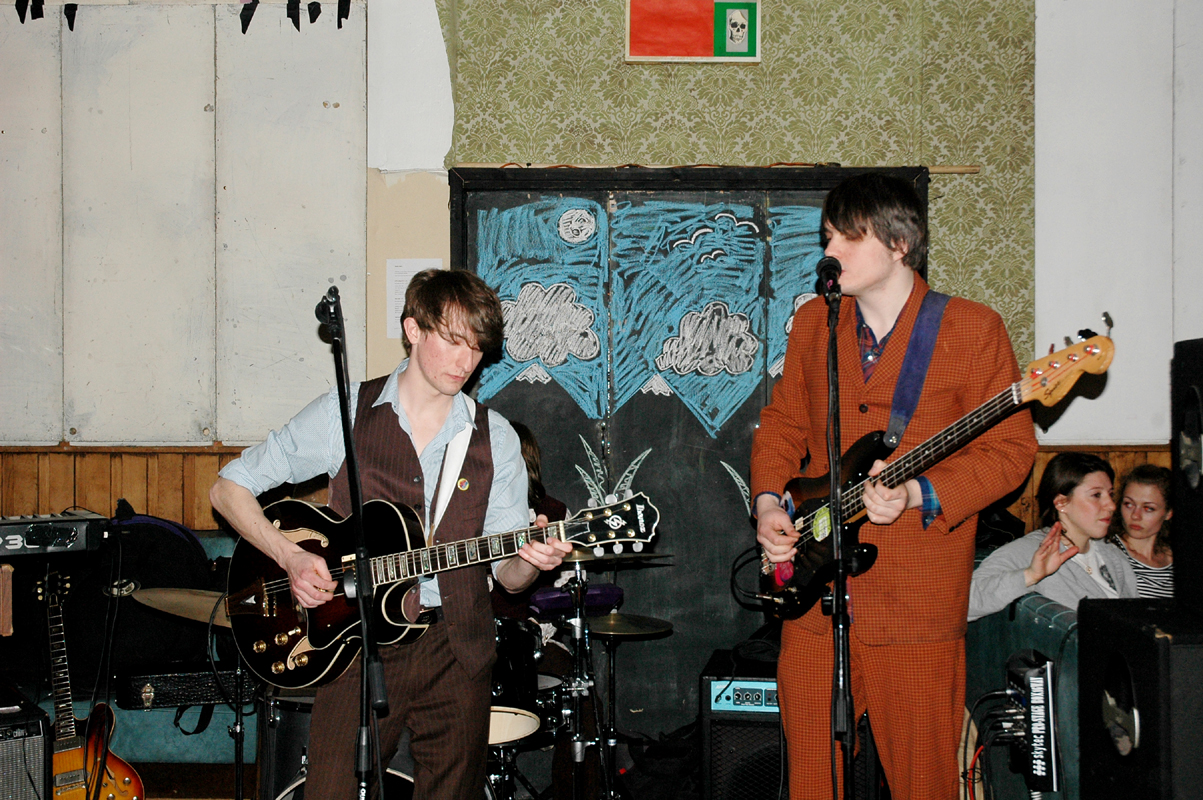
Tom & Paul of The Snap Elect playing at George Tavern, April 2010

Date	Venue	Notes
17 September 2009	The Queen of Hoxton, Shoreditch	Debut gig
19 December 2009	The George Tavern, Stepney Green	With Johnny & The Medicine Show
25 March 2010	Undersolo, Camden	With The Tiny Gods, The Arousers & Monkey Island
10 April 2010	The George Tavern, Stepney Green	With Johnny & The Medicine Show
11 June 2010	The Garage, Highbury	With O.A.R. & Circulus
7 August 2010	Blackfriars, Glasgow	For Eyes Wide Open Club
4 November 2010	The George Tavern, Stepney Green	Album launch with Dignan Porch & The Plimptons
4 December 2010	Kings Cross Social Club, Kings Cross	Cancelled
25 May 2011	The Marine Room, Laguna Beach	US showcase

== Discography ==
=== Studio albums ===
- Mangled Angle Land (2010) download and LP

=== Singles ===
- Magnafox (2010) download
- Good In The Middle (2011) download
