= Barry Allen (disambiguation) =

Barry Allen is the second fictional character named The Flash, a superhero in the DC Comics universe.

Barry Allen may also refer to:

- Barry Allen (Arrowverse), the Arrowverse version of the character
- Barry Allen (DC Extended Universe), the version of the character in the DC Extended Universe film series
- Barry Allen (musician) (1946–2020), Canadian rock guitarist, singer and record producer/engineer
- Barry Allen, one of four young African American victims of Bernhard Goetz's 1984 New York City Subway shooting

== See also ==
- Barry Allan (1928–1962), New Zealand 1956/57 cricketer on List of Otago representative cricketers
- Barry Allan Ackerley (1934–2011), American media chairman and basketball team owner
- Barry Allan (born 1942), Australian rules footballer for North Melbourne in 1962–67
- Barry Allan, English drummer and singer, member of 2009 band The Snap Elect
