= Again and Again (Thieves Like Us album) =

Studio album by Thieves Like Us
- Released: 6 July 2010
- Label: Shelflife Records

Thieves Like Us chronology
| Play Music (2008) | Again and Again (2010) | Bleed Bleed Bleed (2012) |

Professional ratings
Aggregate scores
| Source | Rating |
|---|---|
| Album of the Year | 49/100 |
| Metacritic | 57/100 |
Review scores
| Source | Rating |
| AllMusic | 3/5 stars |
| Consequence of Sound | D- |
| The Phoenix | 2.5/4 stars |
| Pitchfork | 5/10 |
| PopMatters | 6/10 (2010); 6/10 (2011) |
| Prefix | 7.5/10 |
| Urb | 2.5/5 stars |
| Under the Radar | 3/10 stars |

Again and Again is the third studio album (the second on a record label) by electronic music group Thieves Like Us.

Influences on the album included New Order and OMD.
