= When I'm Alone (Girlpuppy album) =

Studio album by Girlpuppy
- Released: October 28, 2022
- Studios: Thorn Hill, Tennessee, United States; Standard Electric (Scottdale, Georgia, United States); Hidden Fortress (Philadelphia, Pennsylvania, United States)
- Genres: indie rock, indie pop, indie folk
- Length: 44:22
- Label: Royal Mountain
- Producer: Samuel Acchione

Singles from When I'm Alone
- 1. "Wish" Released: July 19, 2022; 2. "I Want to Be There" Released: August 10, 2022; 3. "Destroyer" Released: September 6, 2022; 4. "Teenage Dream" Released: October 5, 2022

When I'm Alone is the debut album by American singer-songwriter Girlpuppy. The album was released on October 28, 2022 via Royal Mountain Records.

== Singles ==
When I'm Alone was announced on July 19, 2022 alongside the release of lead single, "Wish", which was accompanied by a music video directed by Matt Swinsky and Eat Humans. The second single, "I Want to Be There", was released on August 10, 2022. The third single, "Destroyer", was released on September 6, 2022 along with a music video directed by Matt Swinsky, and the fourth single, "Teenage Dream", was released on October 5, 2022.

== Influences ==
Girlpuppy was influenced by The Twilight Saga: New Moon soundtrack while making the album along with the novel Daisy Jones & The Six. Her friends and family were also an influence as her best friend is referenced in the song "Emma Marie" and her brother is referenced in the songs "Denver" and "I Want to Be There". Becca Harvey also cited the band Grizzly Bear, specifically the song "On a Neck, On a Spit", as an influence of the album as well.

Professional ratings
Review scores
Source	Rating
Clash	8/10
Exclaim	7/10
The Line of Best Fit	7/10
Medium	7/10
Narc	3.5/5
Under the Radar	7/10

== Track listing ==
No.	Title	Writer(s)	Length
1.	"Final Girl"	Becca Harvey, John Michael Young, Samuel Acchione	0:50
2.	"Wish"	Harvey, Young, Acchione	4:08
3.	"Teenage Dream"	Harvey, Young	3:51
4.	"Swallow"	Harvey, Acchione	4:29
5.	"Somewhere"	Harvey, Acchione	3:41
6.	"I Want to Be There"	Harvey, Young, Acchione	3:24
7.	"Denver"	Harvey, Young	2:38
8.	"Revenant"	Harvey, Young, Tom Sinclair, Acchione	4:05
9.	"Emma Marie"	Harvey, Acchione	4:00
10.	"Destroyer"	Harvey, Young, Acchione	5:23
11.	"When I'm Alone"	Harvey, Acchione	3:13
12.	"Permanent State"	Harvey, Young	4:33
Total length:			44:22

== Personnel ==
- Becca Harvey - vocals, tambourine, claps
- Samuel Acchione - production, background vocals, harmonies, acoustic guitar, electric guitar, twelve-string guitar, slide guitar, bass, loop drums, drums, cabasa, claves, Wurlitzer, keys, tambourine, shaker
- John Michael Young - acoustic guitar, electric guitar, twelve-string guitar, mandolin, bass, drums, keys, bells, glockenspiel, shaker
- Tom Sinclair - bass, Wurlitzer, piano, shaker
- Henry Stoehr - recording, engineering, mixing, harmonies, background vocals, keys, claps
- Tom Kelly - recording and engineering on "Destroyer", "When I'm Alone" and "Revenant", drums
- Blaise O'Brien - piano
- Molly Germer - violin, string arrangements
- Brandon McClain - photography
- Em Davenport - album artwork, layout
- Lucas Reif - typography, layout
- Damon Moon - recording and engineering "Teenage Dream"
- Dan Millice - mastering
- Kieran Ferris - recording and engineering on "Teenage Dream", "Destroyer", "When I'm Alone" and "Revenant"
