= Girlpuppy =

American indie rock musician

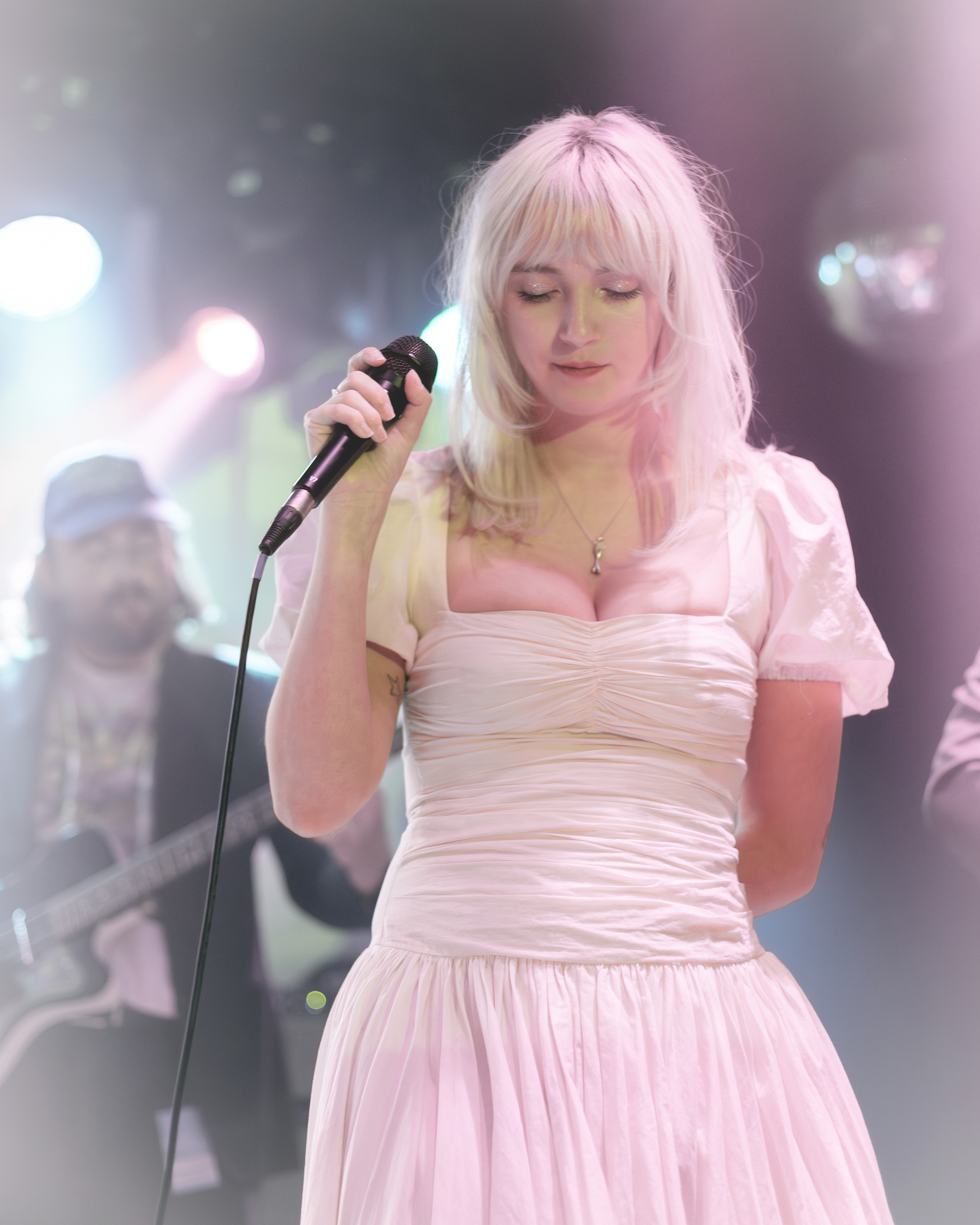

Background information
- Born: Rebecca Alexis Harvey; February 22, 1999 (age 27); Atlanta, Georgia
- Genre: indie rock
- Occupations: singer, songwriter
- Instrument: vocals
- Years active: 2020-present
- Labels: Royal Mountain, Captured Tracks

Rebecca Alexis Harvey, better known by her stage name Girlpuppy, is an American indie rock musician from Atlanta, Georgia.

== History ==
Harvey began her career in 2020, during the COVID-19 pandemic. That same year, she signed to record label Royal Mountain Records and then released her debut EP Swan on August 20, 2021, which was produced by Marshall Vore. In July 2022, Harvey announced her debut album, When I'm Alone. Alongside the announcement, Harvey released a new song titled "Wish". The album was released on October 28, 2022. On December 3, 2024, it was announced that Girlpuppy was signed to the label Captured Tracks alongside the release of the lead single for her sophomore album Sweetness, "Champ".

Harvey's music has been compared to Phoebe Bridgers.

== Discography ==
=== Studio albums ===
- When I'm Alone (2022, Royal Mountain)
- Sweetness (2025, Captured Tracks)

=== EPs ===
- Swan (2021, Royal Mountain)
- Audiotree Live (2021, Audiotree)

=== Singles ===
- "For You" (2020, non-album single, Player Two)
- "Cheerleader" (2020, album single, Royal Mountain)
- "River" (2020, non-album single, Royal Mountain)
- Chateau Lobby #4 (in D for Two Virgins)" (2021, non-album single, Royal Mountain)
- "As Much As I Can" (2021, album single, Royal Mountain)
- "Miniature Furniture" (2021, album single, Royal Mountain)
- "Happy Xmas (War Is Over)" (2021, non-album single, Royal Mountain)
- "I Miss When I Smelled Like You" (2022, non-album single, Royal Mountain)
- "Wish" (2022, album single, Royal Mountain)
- "I Want To Be There" (2022, album single, Royal Mountain)
- "Destroyer" (2022, album single, Royal Mountain)
- "Teenage Dream" (2022, album single, Royal Mountain)
- "Champ" (2024, album single, Captured Tracks)
- "Windows" (2025, album single, Captured Tracks)
- "I Just Do!" (2025, album single, Captured Tracks)
- "Since April" (2025, album single, Captured Tracks)
