= Thus Love =

American post-punk band

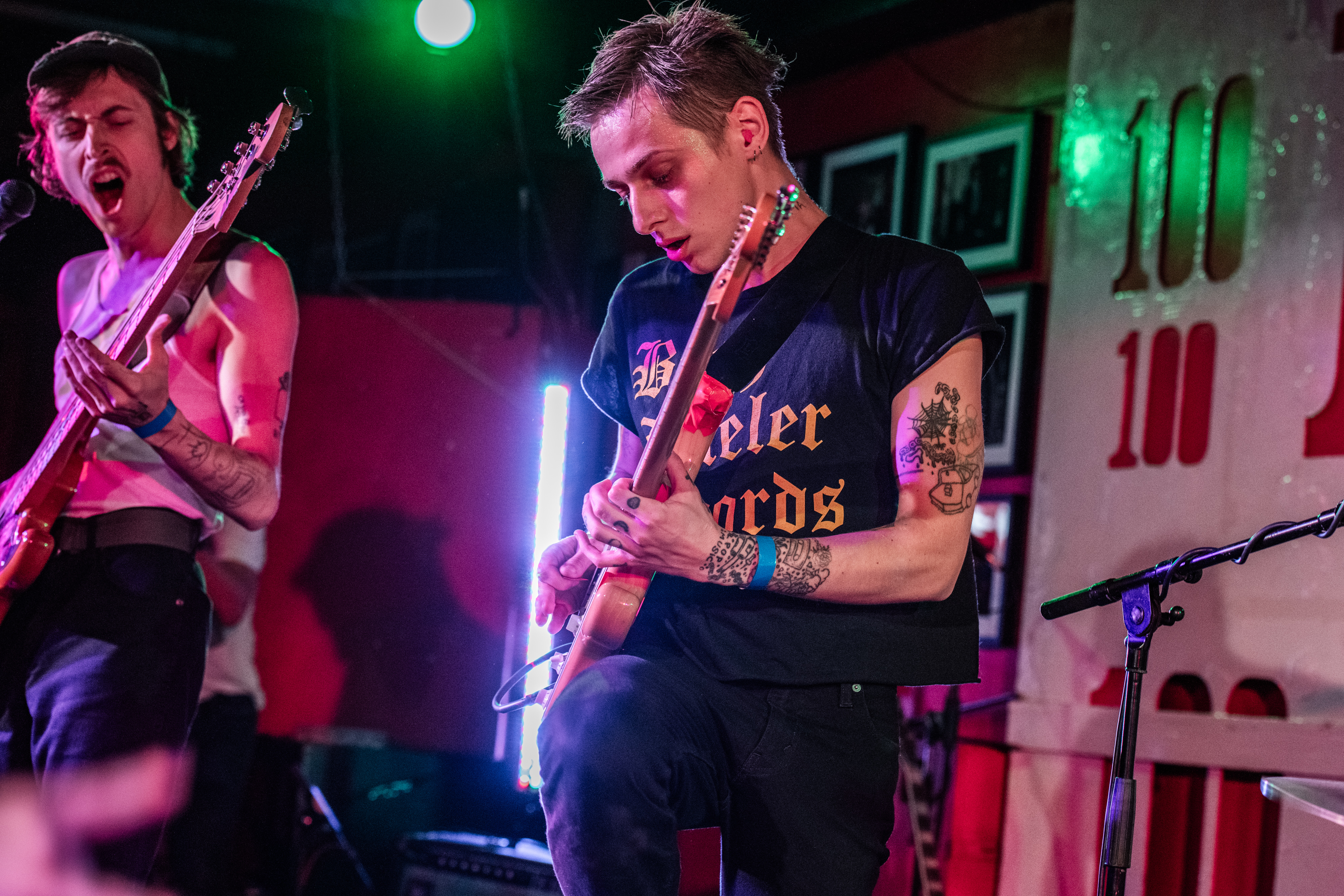
- Thus Love performing at the 100 Club, 2023.

Background information
- Origin: Brattleboro, Vermont
- Genres: post-punk; queercore
- Years active: 2018–present
- Label: Captured Tracks
- Members: Echo Mars; Lu Racine; Ally Juleen; Shane Blank
- Past members: Nathaniel van Osdol
- Website: https://capturedtracks.com/artist/thus-love/

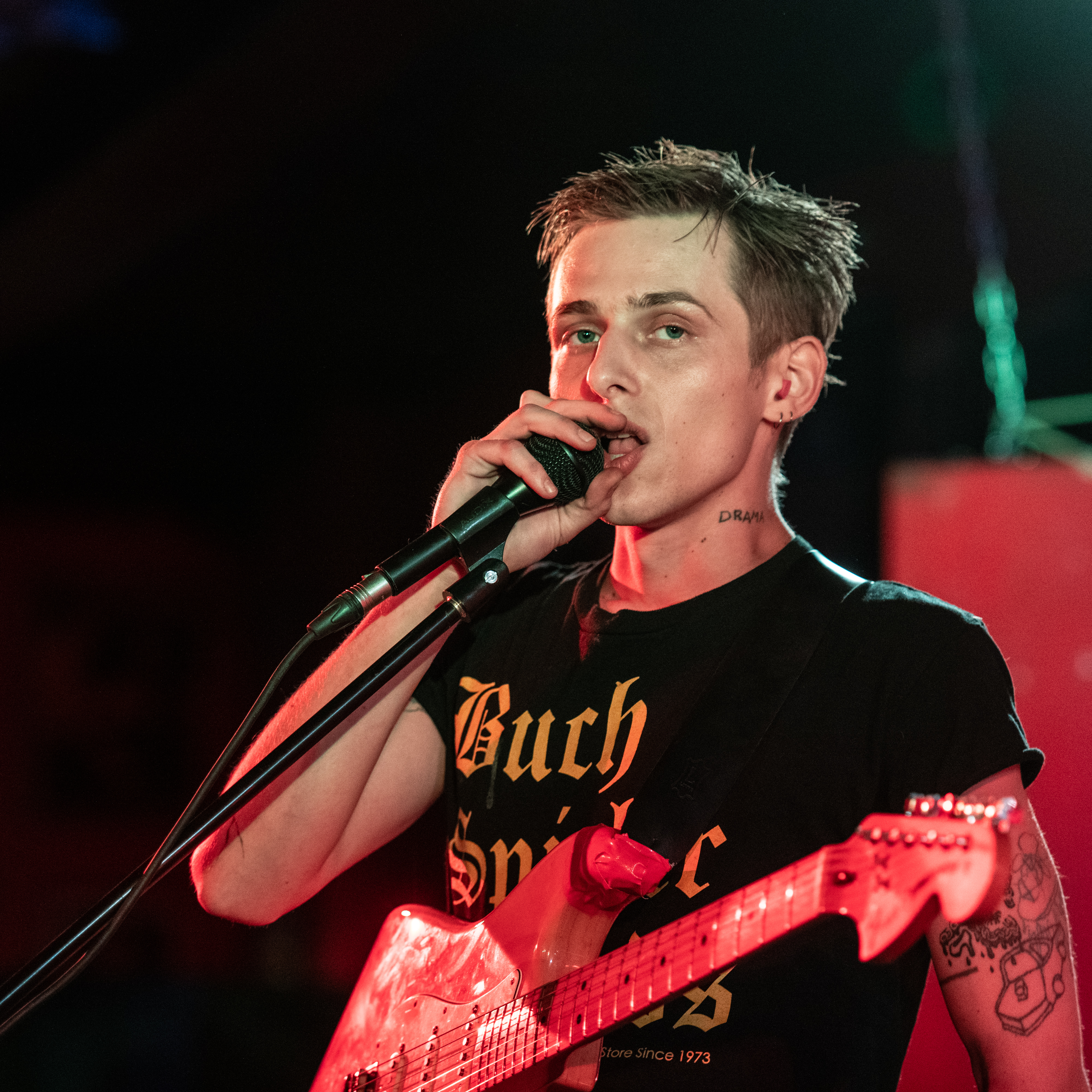
Thus Love at the 100 Club London, 2023.

Thus Love is an American self-styled queer post-punk band from Brattleboro, Vermont, formed in 2018. The four members of the band are vocalist and guitarist Echo Mars (they/them), drummer Lu Racine (he/they), bassist Ally Juleen (she/they), and guitarist and keyboardist Shane Blank (he/him).

== Discography ==
=== Albums ===
- Memorial (Captured Tracks, 2022)
- All Pleasure (Captured Tracks, November 2024)

=== Singles ===
- "Put on Dog" (Captured Tracks, 2023)
- "Centerfield" (Captured Tracks, 2023)
