= Whack It All Down =

EP by Bird Nest Roys
- Released: 1985
- Genre: Indie Rock
- Label: Flying Nun Records - FN044
- Producer: Chris Sheehan

Bird Nest Roys chronology
Whack It All Down (1985)	Bird Nest Roys (1985)

Bird Nest Roys is an EP by the New Zealand band Bird Nest Roys, released in 1985.

== Production ==
The EP was produced by Chris Sheehan at Progressive Studios.

== Critical reception ==
Spin praised the guitar sound, calling it "clean and clear as if it were acoustic," and writing that it "runs through mod-edged surfisms and jingly-strummed janglies."

== Track listing ==
Side A

1. Ain't Mutatin'
2. Batcave

Side B

1. Severed Days
2. Cresta
3. Womcat Stones

== Personnel ==
- Deberly Roy (bass)
- Peter Moerenhout (drums)
- Dominic Stones (guitar)
- Big Ross (guitar, vocals)
- Warro Wakefield (tambourine, backing vocals)
- Little Ross (vocals)
