= Thieves Like Us (band) =

Multinational post-punk band formed in Berlin, Germany

- Origin: Berlin, Germany
- Genres: Electronic music
- Years active: 2002–present
- Labels: Shelflife Records, Kitsuné Musique, Seayou, Captured Tracks
- Members: Andy Grier; Björn Berglund; Martine Duverglas; Thomas Franklin; Tore Knipping
- Past members: Pontus Berghe; Dani Imhoff; Anna De Marco

Thieves Like Us is a multinational Electronic music band led by vocalist and guitarist Andy Grier, with a fluid lineup of members based in Berlin, England and Scandinavia.

== Style ==
The band's music has often featured heavy use of electronic elements but is also influenced by the likes of Krautrock, Italo disco, glam punk, French touch and hip-hop. Thieves Like Us consider themselves a pop group. The band are noted for their strict branding, with all releases following the same format for their covers and associated music videos, the latter created personally by Andy Grier by chopping up films from 1970s European cinema to impressionistic effect.

== History ==
In its early days, the band was a trio consisting of Andy Grier (vocals), and Swedish musicians Pontus Berghe (drums) and Björn Berglund (keyboards), who met the American Grier in Berlin's Mauerpark in 2002. They started DJing together and eventually began producing their own electronic music. After several years self-producing, including the release of the instrumental and semi-ambient album Berlin, Alex in 2005, they were discovered by the French imprint Kitsuné Musique under which the band released its first commercial single, "Drugs In My Body", in May 2007.

On 17 November 2008, the band released their second album, Play Music, under Shelflife Records. The album was recorded in Berlin, London, New York City and Stockholm given the band members were spread across multiple continents.

The band's third album, Again and Again, was released on 6 July 2010 under Shelflife Records. The band later moved labels to Captured Tracks, and reissued Berlin, Alex on 24 January 2012 with a different cover and stylised as Berlin Alex.

Bleed Bleed Bleed, the band's fourth album, was released on 20 March 2012, a darker and somewhat political album with less of the electronica influence of their earlier work. It was at this point that backing vocalists Martine Duverglas and Anna De Marco, and drummer Dani Imhoff, were added to the lineup, with Duverglas taking an equal role alongside Grier on vocal duties on this fourth album. Existential conflict within the trio and weak marketing by the label (alleged by Grier) upon the album's release led to poor sales. Both Berghe and Berglund left soon after to focus on other projects, leading to a hasty tour staffed mostly by session musicians.

After writing several more songs in 2013, Grier recruited both British musician Thomas Franklin from Sameheads, a bar in Neuköln, Berlin, where Grier was working as a bartender, and Berliner, Tore Knipping through a friend. They would tour extensively with the new material before heading back in the studio to record their fifth album, Thieves Like Us. The album eventually released on 27 January 2017 to positive comments from Pitchfork and Consequence of Sound. This was preceded by a cover of Blood Orange track "Sutphin Boulevard" and an accompanying video. The band have consistently received mixed critical reviews while retaining an intense cult status in Europe and Latin America.

== Members ==
- Andy Grier – vocals, guitar
- Chris Wackrow – guitar
- Ramona Strummer – synthesizer
- Thomas Franklin – bass guitar
- Tore Knipping – drums
- Martine Duverglas – backing vocals
- Mia Von Matt – backing vocals
- Monika Martinez – backing vocals

== Past members ==
- Björn Berglund – synthesizer
- Pontus Berghe – drums
- Dani Imhoff – drums
- Annie De Marco – backing vocals

== Discography ==
=== Albums ===
- Berlin, Alex (2005), self-released
- Play Music (2008), Shelflife Records /Seayou Records
- Again and Again (2010), Shelflife Records /DeBonton
- Bleed Bleed Bleed (2012), Captured Tracks
- Thieves Like Us (2017), Seayou Records

=== EPs ===
- Your Heart Feels (2008), Seayou Records / Captured Tracks
- Really Like to See You Again (2009), Shelflife Records
- Your Love Runs Still (2011), Captured Tracks

=== Singles ===
- "Drugs In My Body / Fass" (2007), Kitsuné Musique
- "Never Known Love" (2010), Kitsuné Musique
- "Forget Me Not" (2010), Kitsuné Musique
- "Jennifer" (2017), Seayou Records

=== Music videos ===
- "Drugs In My Body" (2007)
- "Headlong Into Night" (2008)
- "Program Of The First Part (2009)
- "Desire" (2009)
- "Your Heart Feels" (2010)
- "Never Known Love (2010)
- "Forget Me Not" (2011)
- "Lover Lover" (2012)
- "Your Love Runs Still" (2012)
- "Stay Blue" (2013)
- "Maria Marie" (2013)
- "Sutphin Boulevard" (2015)
- "Jennifer" (2016)
- "Broken Mirror" (2017)
