= Blank Dogs =

American post-punk music project

Blank Dogs is an American post-punk project from Brooklyn. It is a monicker for multi-instrumentalist Mike Sniper, who had previously played with DC Snipers.

== Releases ==
Blank Dogs' first releases arrived in 2007. By 2008, it had issued around a hundred releases, in various formats. Among them was an anthology on Troubleman Unlimited Records. Blank Dogs signed with In the Red Records in 2009, and released the full-length Under and Under as a CD and double LP. (The latter pressing had bonus tracks). Crystal Stilts and Vivian Girls guest play on the album.

== Discography ==
=== Albums ===
- On Two Sides (cassette, Fuck It Tapes / LP, Troubleman Unlimited / CD, Sacred Bones, 2008)
- Under and Under (LPx2, CD, In the Red Records, 2009)
- Land and Fixed (LP, Captured Tracks, 2010)

=== EPs ===
- The First Two Weeks (12" Freedom School, 2007)
- Yellow Mice Sleep (7" HoZac, 2007)
- Diana (the Herald) (12" Sacred Bones, 2007)
- The Fields (12" Woodsist / cassette, Fuck It Tapes / CD Woodist, 2008)
- Mirror Lights (cassette, Drone Erant, 2009)
- Captured Tracks Vol. 1 (CD-R, Captured Tracks, 2008)
- Seconds (Captured Tracks, 2009)

=== Singles ===
- The Doorbell Fire (7", Sweet Rot, 2007/2008)
- Two Months (7", Florida's Dying, 2007)
- Stuck Inside The World (7", Daggerman, 2008)
- Setting Fire To Your House (7", 4:2:2, 2008)
- In Here (Slow Room/Anywhere) (7", Down In The Ground, (Captured Tracks), 2008/2009)
- Waiting (7", In The Red Records, 2009)
- Leaves (cassette, Captured Tracks, 2010)
- BDMS (7", Disordered, 2015)

=== Compilations ===
- Blank Box (LP, ?, 2008)
- Year One (cassette, Fuck It Tapes / LP, CD, Sacred Bones, 2008/2009)
- Ages Ago on The World's Lousy With Ideas Vol. 8 (Almost Ready Records, 2009)
- Collected By Itself: 2006-2009 (2xLP/CD, Captured Tracks, 2011)
