= Scout Gillett =

American indie folk musician

- Genre: Indie folk
- Occupation: Singer-songwriter
- Instrument: Guitar
- Years active: 2017–present
- Label: Captured Tracks

Scout Gillett is an American indie folk singer-songwriter and guitarist currently signed to Captured Tracks.

== History ==
Gillett moved from her hometown of Kansas City to Brooklyn in 2017 to pursue a career in music. Upon moving to Brooklyn, she engrossed herself in the music scene, playing in various different bands. In 2022, Gillett moved to a solo career, signing with the Brooklyn-based label Captured Tracks. She released an EP that year titled one to ten consisting of one original song and three covers. Later that same year, Gillett announced her debut full-length album; No Roof No Floor was released on October 28.

== Discography ==
=== Studio albums ===
- No Roof No Floor (Captured Tracks, 2022)

=== EPs ===
- One to Ten (Captured Tracks, 2022)
