= Strange Dreams =

2015 studio album by Alex Calder

Studio album by Alex Calder
- Released: January 20, 2015
- Recorded: 2013–2014
- Studios: Calder's apartment (Edmonton, Alberta)
- Genres: Lo-fi; psychedelic pop; bedroom pop; jangle pop
- Length: 34:54
- Label: Captured Tracks
- Producer: Alex Calder

Alex Calder chronology
Time (2013)	Strange Dreams (2015)	Bend (2016)

Original 2014 cover
- Original 2014 Bandcamp self-release artwork

Strange Dreams is the debut studio album by the Canadian singer-songwriter and musician Alex Calder. It was released on January 20, 2015, through the record label Captured Tracks. Rooted in a lo-fi, psychedelic pop sound, the album was recorded by Calder in his apartment.

Prior to the official label release, Calder self-released an unmastered version of the project to his Bandcamp page for $1 CAD in May 2014, alongside a limited cassette release following scheduling delays.

== Background and recording ==
Following the release of his debut extended play, Time (2013), Calder continued recording music at his apartment in Edmonton. Maintaining a do-it-yourself approach, he performed and produced the record alone. The track "Life Purpose" featured guest vocals from Caitlin Loney of the band Freelove Fenner. Calder stated that the record was a thematic concept album based on his experiences with sleep paralysis.

The recording process for the album was split between two different apartments. After moving during the production of the record, Calder's new neighbors complained about the noise of his live drumming. As a result, he was forced to rely on drum samples to complete the remaining tracks.

Calder finished the initial recording sessions shortly after the release of his debut EP, but Captured Tracks experienced scheduling conflicts that delayed the album's formal release. Calder uploaded the unmastered project to Bandcamp as a free download on May 19, 2014. Once the label finalized a distribution schedule, Calder removed the online version and reworked several tracks for the 2015 release.

== Artwork ==
The cover artwork for the 2015 Captured Tracks release was created by filmmaker and visual artist Cole Kushner (also known as Cole Kush). It depicts a distorted, grainy black-and-white screen still featuring a bust with facial features resembling Calder. The visual style and imagery from the cover are also referenced in the music video for the album track "No Device".

The original artwork used for the self-released 2014 Bandcamp download and limited cassette issue featured a photograph taken at a house party, depicting Calder dressed in a mop-like white wig, dark sunglasses, and black lipstick among partygoers.

== Musical style ==
Critics categorized Strange Dreams as a lo-fi, psychedelic pop, and slacker rock record. The production features distorted vocals layered with reverb, vintage synthesizer tones, and guitar riffs. Reviewers observed that the songwriting occupied a space between the melodicism of Pavement and the acoustic style of Sebadoh.

While critics compared the sound to Mac DeMarco and Ariel Pink, they noted that Calder employed a darker, more melancholic tone. Blog Complex Distractions described the album's aesthetic as a fragmented interpretation of 1980s pop. Northern Transmissions noted that Strange Dreams was "less an album composed of songs than it is a painting made of multiple hues," with Calder's presence "less felt than hinted at." DIY Magazine described the single "Lola" as "a sort of sedated love song that is almost poking fun at itself." Stereogum called the album "mellow" and "maybe even a sleepy one."

== Critical reception ==
Professional ratings
Review scores
Source	Rating
AllMusic	3.5/5 stars
Exclaim!	8/10
Northern Transmissions	7.5/10
The Fire Note	3.5/5
Under the Radar	6/10

Mackenzie Herd of Exclaim! gave the album an 8/10, citing its collage of rock and pop influences. Writing for Northern Transmissions, Fraser Dobbs commended the album's charm. Christopher Anthony of The Fire Note rated the album 3.5/5, comparing the momentum to a slowed-down Tame Impala record. Miles Raymer of Under the Radar scored the album a 6/10, noting that he appreciated the production despite the project's reliance on slacker-rock tropes. AllMusic's Tim Sendra described the record as "a much murkier, far more mysterious affair" than Calder's debut EP, noting Calder's "courage to subvert his skill set in an interesting way." Chase Reitz of Best New Bands wrote that the album "takes all of the strongest elements of the Time EP and expounds on them" and constitutes "a promising debut full-length." NOW Magazine highlighted the "jangly, acid-tinged tracks" and Calder's "precise ear for pop ingenuity." Complex Distractions characterized the record as possessing a "funhouse mirror version of pop" with a "woozy enchantment."

== Track listing ==
All tracks are written by Alex Calder.

No.	Title	Length
1.	"Retract"	3:37
2.	"Strange Dreams"	2:43
3.	"Out of My Head"	2:54
4.	"Memory Resolve"	3:20
5.	"The Morning"	3:05
6.	"Marcel"	2:21
7.	"Lola"	2:16
8.	"No Device"	2:56
9.	"Life Purpose" (featuring Caitlin Loney)	3:41
10.	"Mid Life Holiday"	4:27
11.	"Someone"	3:34

Original 2014 Bandcamp release
No.	Title	Length
1.	"Retract"	3:51
2.	"Strange Dreams"	2:42
3.	"Memory Resolve"	3:32
4.	"The Morning"	3:10
5.	"Slowing Down"	3:11
6.	"Born In Another Time"	4:01
7.	"Lola"	2:25
8.	"No Device"	3:08
9.	"Life Purpose" (featuring Caitlin Loney)	3:39
10.	"Someone"	3:30
11.	"Mid Life Holiday"	4:35

== Personnel ==
- Alex Calder – vocals, guitar, bass, drums, synthesizer, production
- Caitlin Loney – vocals (track 9)
- Cole Kushner – cover art, video stills
