= Lina Tullgren =

Lina Tullgren is an American musician from South Berwick, Maine.

== History ==
Tullgren's first musical output was an EP in 2015 titled Wishlist. The following year, upon signing to the record label Captured Tracks, Tullgren re-released their EP. In September 2017, Tullgren announced plans to release their debut full-length album. The album, titled Won, was released on September 22, 2017. In 2019, Tullgren announced plans to release their second full-length album. The album, titled Free Cell, was released on August 23, 2019. The album received a 7.3 out of 10 from Pitchfork. In 2021, Ba Da Bing released VISITING, an album of solo violin pieces.

== Discography ==
=== Studio albums ===
- Won (2017, Captured Tracks)
- Free Cell (2019, Captured Tracks)
- VISITING (2021, Ba Da Bing)

=== EPs ===
- Wishlist (2015, self- released; re-released in 2016, Captured Tracks)
