= Widowspeak (Widowspeak album) =

Studio album by Widowspeak
- Released: August 16, 2011
- Recorded: 2010–11
- Genre: Indie rock, dream pop, shoegaze
- Length: 33:09
- Label: Captured Tracks

Widowspeak chronology
Widowspeak (2011)	Almanac (2013)

Professional ratings
Aggregate scores
Source	Rating
Metacritic	75
Review scores
Source	Rating
AllMusic	4/5 stars
Pitchfork Media	7.5/10.0

Widowspeak is the debut album by Widowspeak, released in 2011 by Captured Tracks. At Metacritic, which assigns a normalised rating out of 100 to reviews from mainstream critics, Widowspeak received an average score of 75, based on 10 reviews, indicating "generally favorable reviews".

== Track listing ==
1. "Puritan"
2. "Harsh Realm"
3. "Nightcrawlers"
4. "In the Pines"
5. "Limbs"
6. "Gun Shy"
7. "Hard Times"
8. "Fir Coat"
9. "Half Awake"
10. "Ghost Boy"
