= Time (Alex Calder EP) =

EP by Alex Calder
- Released: March 19, 2013
- Recorded: 2011–2012
- Studios: Calder's homes (Edmonton and Montreal)
- Genres: Lo-fi; bedroom pop; psychedelic pop; dream pop
- Length: 20:28
- Label: Captured Tracks
- Producer: Alex Calder

Alex Calder chronology
| Time (2013) | Strange Dreams (2015) |

Time is the debut extended play (EP) by the Canadian musician Alex Calder. It was released on March 19, 2013, through the independent label Captured Tracks. The project marked Calder's first official solo release under his own name, following his tenure as the drummer for the indie rock project Makeout Videotape.

== Background and recording ==
After the dissolution of Makeout Videotape, Calder moved from Vancouver to Edmonton, where he began writing and recording solo material. He initially uploaded his early bedroom pop demos to the audio platform Bandcamp under the anonymous pseudonym Collage Party. His former collaborator, Mac DeMarco, sent the Collage Party recordings to Mike Sniper, the founder of the Brooklyn-based label Captured Tracks. Sniper offered Calder a record deal, prompting him to drop the pseudonym and release the material under his own name.

Calder recorded the majority of the EP at home using a minimal digital setup, primarily relying on Ableton software, an audio interface, and a single condenser microphone. Half of the songs originated as demos recorded in Edmonton with the help of his friend Jon Lent around 2011. The remainder of the tracks were completed in Calder's living room in Montreal after he relocated there in late 2012.

== Musical style and themes ==
Reviewers categorized the EP's sound as lo-fi, bedroom pop, and hazy dream pop. Critical analyses noted a heavy use of chiming, pitch-bent guitars and gentle, subliminal percussion layered over traditional pop song structures. Calder mixed his murmured falsetto vocals exceptionally low to create an abstracted, distant atmosphere.

Calder later noted that the EP's distinct, "warbly" and out-of-tune aesthetic was the result of him heavily experimenting with cheap guitar effects pedals.

Music critics frequently compared the release to the warped, 1970s-inspired pop of Ariel Pink and the slacker rock of DeMarco, though they noted Calder's approach was far more fragmented and atmospheric. The opening track, "Suki and Me", was named after Calder's childhood pet cat, and functioned conceptually as a disjointed recollection of youth. Reviewers pointed to "Light Leave Your Eyes" as a more traditional take on spacey shoegaze, highlighting its unexpected tempo changes and breezy acoustic elements. Pitchfork described the EP as "definitely a slacker's dream" with "addictive little hooks at nearly every turn." Consequence of Sound characterized it as "a disaffecting, laconic stroll" and noted Calder "understands that pop is sometimes better when it gets a little weird."

== Release and reception ==
Professional ratings
Review scores
| Source | Rating |
|---|---|
| AllMusic | 3.5/5 stars |
| MVRemix | Positive |
| No Ripcord | 7/10 |
| Pitchfork | 6.9/10 |
| PopMatters | 5/10 |

Captured Tracks released Time on March 26, 2013. To promote the EP, the label released a music video for the track "Light Leave Your Eyes". The Canadian music publication Exclaim! also hosted an exclusive stream of the full EP prior to its official launch. Exclaim! also premiered a music video for the track "Fatal Delay" in March 2013.

The EP received mostly positive feedback from contemporary music critics, who praised its atmospheric qualities while occasionally critiquing its lack of direct pop hooks. Pitchfork awarded the release a 6.9 out of 10, praising Calder's strong melodic sensibilities and comparing his underlying pop songwriting abilities favorably to those of his former collaborator, DeMarco. Matt Bevington of No Ripcord rated the EP a 7/10, describing it as a "rich tapestry with undefined and pliable parameters" that required patience from the listener to fully appreciate. Keith Roberts of MVRemix praised the balance between dissonant atmospheres and pop structure, noting that Calder successfully tapped into a unique and "slightly off" aesthetic. A mixed review from Matt Messana at PopMatters scored the release a 5/10; he suggested the heavy musical abstraction sometimes felt artificial and resulted in an uneasy listening experience, though he highlighted "Suki and Me" as an upbeat and fully-formed standout track. Indie Rock Cafe noted "a certain calm detachment that rules" the EP and praised its "stream-of-consciousness vibe." The Fire Note singled out "Suki and Me" as "a perfect 3 minute pop song that will keep you hitting repeat" while praising "Light Leave Your Eyes" as "incredibly catchy" bedroom pop. Northern Transmissions called "Time" "insanely catchy" and noted the EP demonstrated Calder "on a quest for a purpose to his life."

== Track listing ==
All tracks are written by Alex Calder.

| No. | Title | Length |
|---|---|---|
| 1. | "Suki and Me" | 2:45 |
| 2. | "Light Leave Your Eyes" | 3:05 |
| 3. | "Location" | 3:41 |
| 4. | "Time" | 2:14 |
| 5. | "Captivate" | 2:36 |
| 6. | "Fatal Delay" | 3:23 |
| 7. | "Lethargic" | 2:44 |
