= Play Music (album) =

Studio album by Thieves Like Us
- Released: 17 November 2008
- Label: Shelflife Records

Thieves Like Us chronology
Berlin, Alex (2007)	Play Music (2008)	Again and Again (2010)

Play Music is the second studio album by electronic group Thieves Like Us.

== Critical reception ==
Professional ratings
Aggregate scores
Source	Rating
Metacritic	48/100
Review scores
Source	Rating
AllMusic	2.5/5 stars
Contactmusic.com	6/10
Drowned in Sound	5/10
IndieLondon	1/5
The Line of Best Fit	30%
NME	1/5 stars
Pitchfork	5.6/10
PopMatters	6/10 stars
Q	2/5 stars

IndieLondon criticized Play Music for the song tempos being too slow for the dance style it aimed for and also panned the lead singer's performance. An extremely negative NME review from Alex Hoban dismissed the album as a set of "boring songs about drugs" with "vaguely voguish words" and "empty lyrics," wondering if he was "caught up in some kind of late April Fool" instead of an actual record. The Line of Best Fit bashed the record for its lack of stylistic and instrumental variety between tracks, describing the experience as "faceless, soulless, heartless synthetics in its prime as this Parisian trio pursue only what they know, and care nothing for what they don't."

Exclaim! was one of the few publications to run a favorable review, where Cam Lindsay praised its mixture of styles from different countries with pop music elements and a dark mood: "Play Music is the complete package, with a resounding desire to keep you locked in with misshapen melodies and distorted emotion. Even two years after its debut, it still sounds freshly squeezed, without any indication of going sour any time soon."
