= Widow White Creek =

Coordinates: 40°57′31″N 124°06′54″W

Widow White Creek is a small tributary of Norton Creek in McKinleyville, California, that lies just south of the Arcata-Eureka Airport in Humboldt County. In 2014 the North Coast regional water board recommended that Widow White Creek be listed as an impaired waterway due to E. coli contamination 600 times greater than normal.
