= Widów =

Widów may refer to the following places:

- Widów, Masovian Voivodeship (east-central Poland)
- Widów, Silesian Voivodeship (south Poland)
- Widów, West Pomeranian Voivodeship (north-west Poland)
