= Juan Wauters =

- Born: Montevideo, Uruguay
- Genres: Indie rock
- Occupation: singer-songwriter
- Instruments: vocals, guitar
- Label: Captured Tracks
- Formerly of: The Beets
- Website: juanwauters.com

Juan Pablo Wauters is a singer-songwriter and guitarist signed to Captured Tracks. Born in Montevideo, Uruguay, Wauters relocated to New York City in 2002.

== Career ==
Years after moving to Jackson Heights, Queens with his family at age 17, Juan Wauters formed an indie rock band named The Beets with bassist Jose Garcia and drummer Jacob Warstler. The band released albums on Hardly Art and Captured Tracks. Juan Wauters released his debut solo album NAP: North American Poetry in 2014. The following year, Wauters released his sophomore recording Who Me? The album received a 6.0 rating on Pitchfork. Who Me? features songs sung in both Spanish and English. Wauters has shared stages with artists such as Jeff Tweedy, Mac DeMarco, and Foxygen.

== Discography ==
- NAP: North American Poetry (2014)
- Who Me? (2015)
- La Onda de Juan Pablo (2019)
- Introducing Juan Pablo (2019)
- Real Life Situations (2021)
- Wandering Rebel (2023)
- Mvd Luv (2025)
