= Bird Nest Roys =

New Zealand rock group

The Bird Nest Roys were a New Zealand rock group, formed in the mid-1980s in the hills west of Auckland, New Zealand. They released a highly acclaimed ep (whack it all down), a single (Jaffa Boy) one self-titled album on Flying Nun Records. Despite being from Auckland, they are frequently cited as one of the bands that played the Dunedin sound, named after the city of Dunedin in the South Island of New Zealand.

A six-piece, the band was fronted by members Big Ross and Little Ross, and featured future Snapper and The 3Ds member Dominic Stones on guitar. The group attracted an odd ensemble of characters with their own coded language, and a combination of Westie and early Grey Lynn culture. They frequently practiced on an old 50-acre (20 ha) farm called Nosnaws (named in honour of the local Swanson area), in the foothills of the Waitakere Ranges. Being part of the Flying Nun record label enabled the band to play numerous gigs up and down New Zealand.

The band reformed for a one-off gig at the old Rising Sun Hotel in Karangahape Road in early January 2008. A compilation album of all their recorded work, Me Want Me Get Me Need Me Have Me Love, was released in August 2013.

== Personnel ==
- Big Ross (Ross Williams) - guitar and vocals
- Little Ross (Ross Hollands) - guitar and vocals
- Rupert E Taylor (Warwick Wakefield) - keyboards, tambourine, backing vocals, dance
- Deberly Roy (Deborah Shadbolt)- bass
- Dominic Stones - guitar
- Peter Moerenhout - drums

== Discography ==
=== Albums ===
- Bird Nest Roys album (1987 - Flying Nun FN065)

=== Compilation albums ===
- Me Want Me Get Me Need Me Have Me Love (2013 - Flying Nun)

=== Singles ===
- "Jaffa Boy" / "Bus Stop" (1986 - Flying Nun FN067)
- "I Need Your Love" (Flying Nun FN087)

=== EPs ===
- Whack It All Down EP (1985 - Flying Nun FN044) #20
