= Widowspeak =

American indie rock band

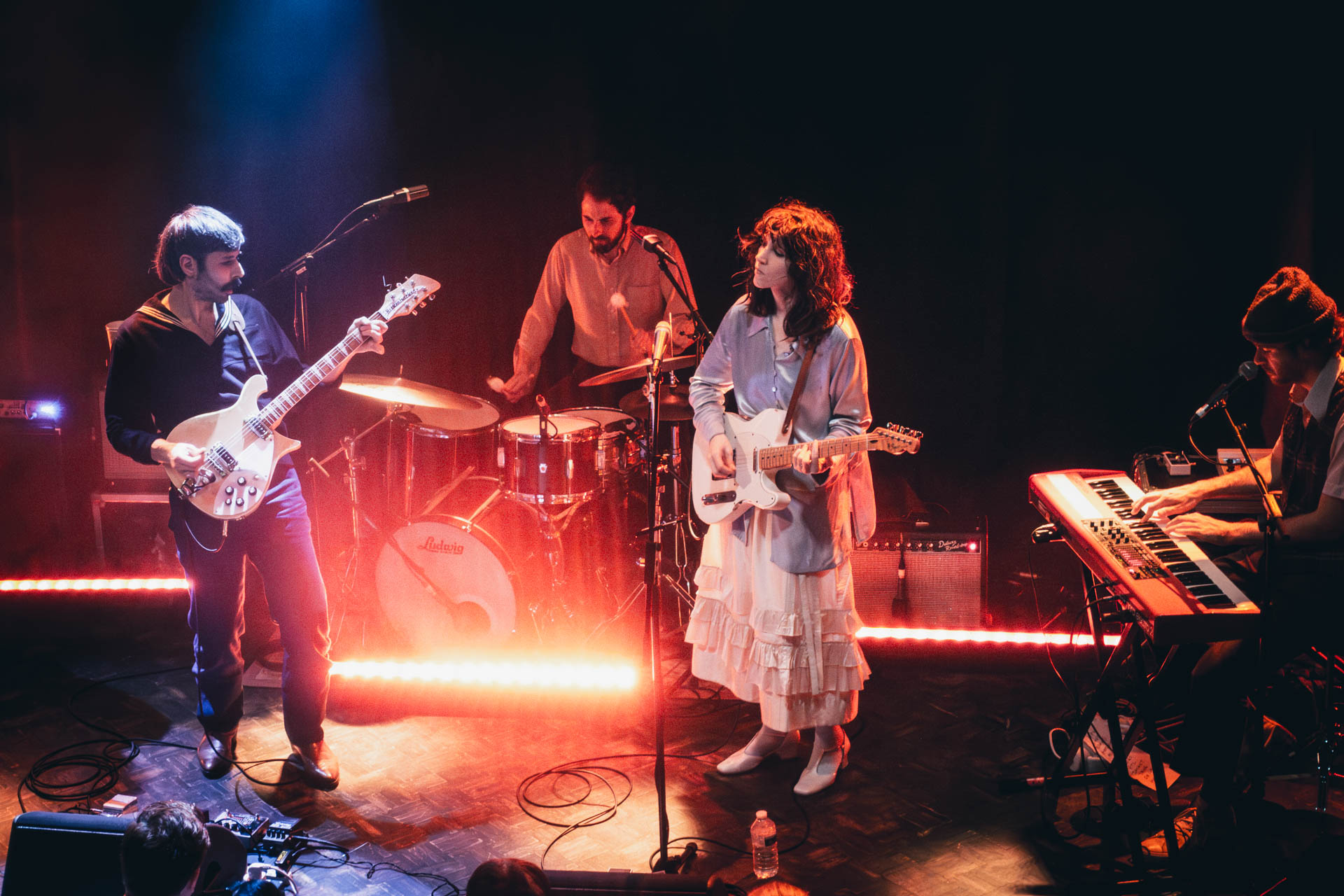
- Widowspeak in March 2024 in the UK

Background information
- Origin: New York City, New York, United States
- Genres: Indie rock; dream pop; cowboy pop; shoegaze
- Years active: 2010–present
- Label: Captured Tracks
- Members: Molly Hamilton; Robert Earl Thomas
- Past members: Pamela Garavano-Coolbaugh; Michael Stasiak
- Website: www.widowspeakforever.com

Widowspeak is an American indie rock band from Brooklyn, New York City, United States. The band consists of guitarist and vocalist Molly Hamilton and guitarist Robert Earl Thomas.

== History ==
The band formed in Brooklyn in 2010 by Tacoma, Washington natives Molly Hamilton and her friend Michael Stasiak, who have known each other since they were teenagers. The pair met with guitarist Robert Earl Thomas and began practicing together. The band released their debut album Widowspeak in August 2011 to critical acclaim. The single "Harsh Realm" was featured in an episode of the television series American Horror Story. In 2012, the band recruited bassist Pamela Garavano-Coolbaugh for their subsequent tours.

After touring extensively for the first album, Stasiak and Garavano-Coolbaugh left the band. At the beginning of 2012, Widowspeak began to work on their second full-length album, Almanac. Almanac was recorded by producer Kevin McMahon, who has also produced for Swans and Real Estate. The recording sessions took place in a century-old barn in the Hudson River Valley late in the summer of 2012. Almanac was released January 22, 2013. In March 2013, Widowspeak was named one of Fuse TV's 30 must-see artists at SXSW

In 2015, Widowspeak released the album All Yours. The fourth album Expect the Best was recorded at Marcata Recording, New Paltz, New York and released August 2017. Molly Hamilton wrote the songs in her home town Tacoma, Washington. It's a return to the sounds of their beginnings.

Widowspeak released their fifth album, Plum, in 2020. In 2022 they released their sixth album, The Jacket. Widowspeak's seventh album "Roses" was released June 5, 2026 by Captured Tracks.

== Discography ==
=== Studio albums ===
- Widowspeak (16 August 2011, Captured Tracks)
- Almanac (22 January 2013, Captured Tracks)
- All Yours (28 August 2015, Captured Tracks)
- Expect the Best (25 August 2017, Captured Tracks)
- Plum (28 August 2020, Captured Tracks)
- The Jacket (11 March 2022, Captured Tracks)
- Roses (4 June 2026, Captured Tracks)

=== Other releases ===
- Harsh Realm 7" (2011, Captured Tracks)
- Gun Shy 7" (2011, Captured Tracks)

=== EP ===
- The Swamps (November 2013, Captured Tracks)
- Honeychurch (22 January 2021, Captured Tracks)
