= White widow =

White Widow may refer to:

- Samantha Lewthwaite (born 1983), terrorist suspect and widow of 7/7 suicide bomber Germaine Lindsay
- Sally-Anne Jones, British-born U.N.-designated recruiter and propaganda for the Islamic State (ISIS)
- White Widow (Cannabis), a strain of Cannabis
- White widow spider (Latrodectus pallidus), a white-colored species of widow spiders
- White Widow, a novel by Jim Lehrer
- White Widow, a fictional character in Mission: Impossible – Fallout
- White Widow, a codename assumed by Marvel Comics character Yelena Belova
- White Widow, a superhero character in comic books published by Absolute Comics
- "White Widow", a song by the Italian band Afterhours

== See also ==
- Widow White Creek, California
