= Blouse (band) =

American alternative rock band

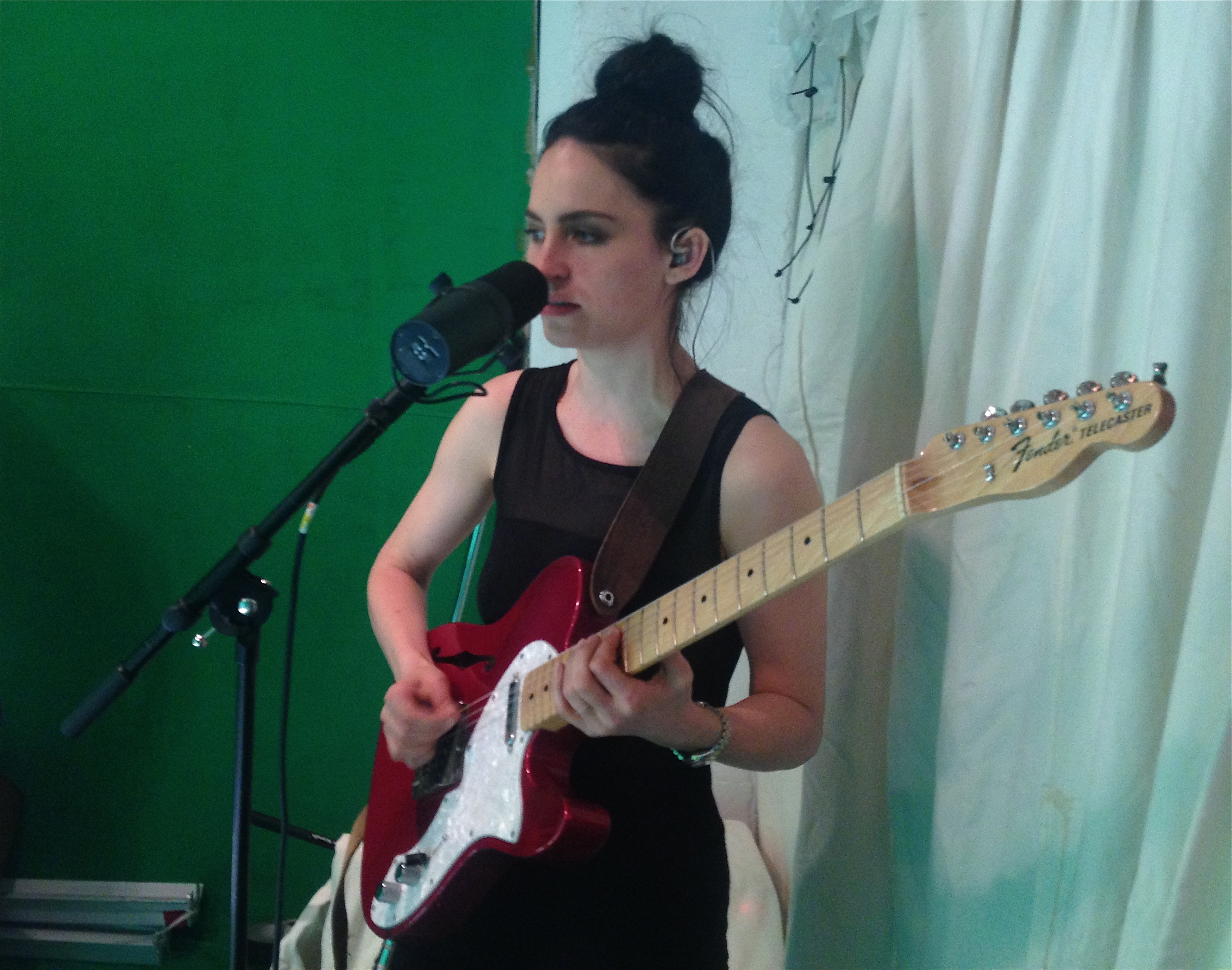
- Charlie Hilton (2012)

Background information
- Origin: Portland, Oregon, USA
- Genres: Alternative rock, indie rock, dream pop, shoegaze, synthpop
- Years active: 2010-2014
- Label: Captured Tracks
- Past members: Charlie Hilton; Patrick Adams; Jacob Portrait; Live members: Misty Mary; Paul Roper
- Website: blouseblouse.com, facebook.com/bblouse

Blouse is an American alternative rock band based in Portland, Oregon formed in 2010 by Charlie Hilton (vocals, guitar) and Patrick Adams (bass).

== History ==
Hilton and Adams met while attending the Graphic Design program at Portland State University. They began to record with Jacob Portrait (producer, guitar) at the warehouse in Portland, Oregon. Following the release of two demo tracks on their Bandcamp, the band was signed to Brooklyn-based label Captured Tracks. Their first single "Into Black", was released in March 2011 by Captured Tracks. Succeeding their release of "Into Black", Sub Pop released the band's second 7" single "Shadow" in May 2011. Blouse released their debut self-titled LP in November 2011. In 2011, the band was joined by Paul Roper on drums.

The Blouse LP was said by Pitchfork to be like music from the "Reagan Era" but still being able to fit in with the music of 2010. Much of their album is regarded as being reminiscent of the 80's. Blouse has also integrated post-punk instrumentation into their sound.

The band said their sound was shaped by music from artists including Love and Rockets, Lush, Suicide, OMD, Talking Heads, and The Velvet Underground and Nico.

== Discography ==
=== Studio albums ===
Title	Album details
Blouse	Released: November 1, 2011; Label: Captured Tracks; Format: LP, CD, digital download
Imperium	Released: 2013; Label: Captured Tracks

=== Singles ===
Year	Song
2011	"Into Black": B-side: "Firestarter"; Label: Captured Tracks (CT-099)
2011	"Shadow": B-side: "Nights and Days"; Label: Sub Pop
2012	"Pale Spectre" The Wake cover on "Gruesome Flowers 2: A Tribute to the Wake" Split 7": B-side: Craft Spells "Talk About The Past"; Label: Captured Tracks (CT-153)
2013	"No Shelter": Label: Captured Tracks (CT-153)
