= Dignan Porch =

British rock band

- Origin: London, UK
- Genres: indie rock; psychedelic pop
- Years active: 2010–present
- Labels: Captured Tracks, Edils Recodrings, Faux Discx, Hidden Bay, Repeating Cloud, Safe Suburban Home
- Members: Joe Walsh; Sam Walsh; Luke Walsh; Ben Goodwin; Hayley Akins; Philippa Bloomfield
- Past members: Stephen Keane

Dignan Porch is a DIY indie rock band from Tooting Broadway, London. They began as the bedroom recording project of songwriter Joseph Walsh, then grew into a full band, creating music that has been described by critics as a combination of lo-fi, indie rock, pop and punk.

== History ==
The band have found a cult-like following thanks to releases on Captured Tracks and Faux Discx and a long-running residency at The Windmill, Brixton. They have released three albums and a number of EP's and singles. Second album Nothing bad will ever happen is known for having been recorded live on reel-to-reel tape and with very few overdubs, an approach rarely used in contemporary pop music, even in the indie world.

== Members ==
Current

- Joe Walsh - Vocals, Guitar (2010–present)
- Sam Walsh - Guitar (2010?–present)
- Louis O'Rourke - Bass (2022?–present)
- Hayley Akins - Keyboard, Vocals (2010?–present)
- Philippa Bloomfield - Drums (2010?–present)
- Luke Walsh - Drums (2013?–present)

Former

- Stephen Keane - Drums (2010?–2013?)
- Ben Goodwin - Bass (2010?–2019)

== Discography ==
Studio albums

- Tendrils (2010, Captured Tracks)
- Nothing Bad Will Ever Happen (2012, Captured Tracks)
- Observatory (2014, Faux Discx)
- Secretions (2018, self released)
- Electric Threads (2023, Hidden Bay/Safe Suburban Home/Repeating Cloud)

EPs

- Deluded (2011, Captured Tracks)
- crème (2015, Edils Recodrings)
