= JayWood =

Canadian musician

JayWood is the stage name of Jeremy Haywood-Smith, a Canadian musician from Winnipeg, Manitoba whose music blends soul, funk, hip hop, indie rock and psychedelic rock influences.

He released a number of singles and EPs in the 2010s before releasing his full-length debut album Time in 2019. He followed up in 2021 with Some Days, a newly rerecorded version of one of his early EPs, and followed up with his second full-length album, Slingshot, in 2022.

Slingshot was longlisted for the 2023 Polaris Music Prize, and Leo Negro was longlisted for the 2026 Polaris Music Prize.
