= The Merry Widow (disambiguation) =

The Merry Widow is an operetta by Franz Lehár.

The Merry Widow may also refer to:

== Arts, entertainment, and media ==
=== Adaptations of Lehár's operetta ===
Ballet

- The Merry Widow (ballet), an adaptation of the operetta

Films

- The Merry Widow (1918 film), a Hungarian silent film directed by Michael Curtiz
- The Merry Widow (1925 film), a silent film directed by Erich von Stroheim, starring Mae Murray and John Gilbert
- The Merry Widow (1934 film) directed by Ernst Lubitsch, starring Maurice Chevalier and Jeanette MacDonald
- The Merry Widow (1952 film), directed by Curtis Bernhardt
- The Merry Widow (1962 film), Austrian film directed by Werner Jacobs
- The Merry Widow (2007 film), a French comedy film

=== Other arts, entertainment, and media ===
- The Merry Widow (TV series), a French television series which uses the music from the operetta, but not the plot
- Thee Merry Widows, a psychobilly band

== People ==
- Mary Elizabeth Wilson (1889-1963), also known as the Merry widow of Windy Nook

== Other uses ==
- Merry widow, a type of corselette
- Merry widow, a common name of the fish Phallichthys amates
- Merry Widows of Joe Cain, Mardi Gras women's mystic society in Mobile, Alabama

== See also ==
- Widow
