= Captured Tracks =

American independent record label

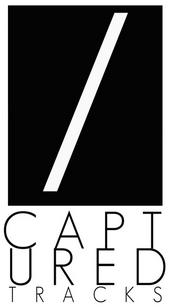
- Parent company: Omnian Music Group
- Founded: 2008
- Founder: Mike Sniper
- Distributor: BWSCD, Inc.
- Genre: Indie pop, indie rock, post-punk, dream pop
- Country of origin: United States
- Location: Brooklyn, New York
- Official website: https://capturedtracks.com

Captured Tracks is an American independent record label based in Brooklyn, New York. The label was founded in 2008 by Mike Sniper. In 2014, the label's founder launched the umbrella company Omnian Music Group which currently includes sister labels Captured Tracks, Sinderlyn, and 2MR (electronic music).

== About ==
The label's current roster of artists includes Becca Mancari, Craft Spells, Dinner/Anders Rhedin, Drahla, GIFT, girlpuppy, JayWood, Juan Wauters, the Lemon Twigs, Locate S,1, MMJ, Martin Newell, Reptaliens, THUS LOVE, Wax Chattels, Widowspeak, and Wild Nothing.

Captured Tracks has reissued recordings by the Monochrome Set, the Wake, the Servants, Stockholm Monsters, the Cleaners from Venus, Linda Smith, and Kate Fagan.

The label has also reissued recordings from New Zealand's Flying Nun Records, L.A.'s Medicine and Nebraska's For Against, among others.

Former roster artists include Beach Fossils, Blouse, Chris Cohen, DIIV, Mac DeMarco, and the Soft Moon and more. The label also released early material by Alex Calder before severing ties with him in October 2017 and pulling his catalog following an allegation of sexual assault.

== Artists ==
=== Current roster ===
Artists on the label's roster as of October 2026:

- B Boys
- Becca Mancari
- Craft Spells
- Dinner / Anders Rhedin
- Drahla
- GIFT
- girlpuppy
- JayWood
- Juan Wauters
- Locate S,1
- Martin Newell
- Meredith Graves
- mmj
- Sam Burton
- The Lemon Twigs
- THUS LOVE
- Wax Chattels
- Widowspeak
- Wild Nothing

=== Reissues ===
Captured Tracks has built a substantial reissue catalogue, issuing archival recordings by artists including:

- Able Tasmans
- Bird Nest Roys
- Bona Dish
- Bored Games
- Capital Punishment
- Cleaners from Venus
- David Kilgour
- David Westlake
- For Against
- Kate Fagan
- Linda Smith
- Luna
- Medicine
- Milk 'N' Cookies
- Mouth Congress
- OXZ
- Peter Jefferies & Jono Lonie
- Saâda Bonaire
- Skeptics
- Snapper
- Sneaky Feelings
- Stockholm Monsters
- Tall Dwarfs
- The 6ths
- The Apartments
- The Bats
- The Chills
- The Clean
- The Monochrome Set
- The Servants
- The Stones
- The Verlaines
- The Wake
- Toy Love

=== Former artists ===
Artists who have released material on the label but are no longer on its roster include:

- Alex Calder
- Axxa/Abraxas
- Beach Fossils
- Blank Dogs
- Blouse
- Boulevards
- Charlie Hilton
- Chastity
- Chris Cohen
- COSMETICS
- Dignan Porch
- DIIV
- Donovan Blanc
- EZTV
- Gabriella Cohen
- Hanoi Janes
- Heavenly Beat
- Holograms
- HXXS
- Lina Tullgren
- Mac DeMarco
- Minks
- Molly Burch
- Mourn
- Naomi Punk
- Nic Hessler
- Perfect Pussy
- Reptaliens
- Robert Earl Thomas
- Scout Gillett
- Soft Metals
- The Soft Moon
- Thieves Like Us
- Tim Cohen
- Wetdog

== Discography ==
Cat. No.	Artist	Title (format)	Year
CT-001	Dum Dum Girls	Dum Dum Girls (EP)	2009
CT-002	Blank Dogs	Seconds (12", EP, Ltd)	2009
CT-003	Repairs	Repairs EP (cassette)	2009
CT-004	Woods	"Sunlit" (7")	2009
CT-005	Brilliant Colors	"Brilliant Colors" (7")	2009
CT-006	The Mayfair Set	"The Mayfair Set" (single)	2009
CT-007	Gary War	Opens (cassette)	2009
CT-008	The Bitters	Wooden Glove (12", EP)	2009
CT-009	Blessure Grave	Learn to Love the Rope (12", EP)	2009
CT-010	The Beets	Spit in the Face of People Who Don't Want to Be Cool (LP/CD, album)	2009
CT-011	The German Measles	Don't Hassle Us We're Loco (cassette)	2009
CT-012	Kid Romance	"F*** Punx/I Use Electricity" (7")	2009
CT-012	Kid Romance	Thriller (cassette)	2009
CT-013	Blank Dogs	"Slow Room!" (7")	2009
CT-014	Roman Soldiers	"Roman Soldiers" (7")	2009
CT-015	Teenage Panzerkorps	Knut Hamsun EP (7", EP, Ltd)	2009
CT-016	The Beets	"Don't Fit in My Head" (7")	2009
CT-017	Little Girls	"Youth Tunes" (7")	2009
CT-019	Various	Captured Tracks Mix CD (CDr, Comp)	2009
CT-020	Brilliant Colors	Brilliant Colors (12", EP)	2009
CT-021	The Mayfair Set	Young One (LP/CD, album)	2009
CT-022	Gary War	Galactic Citizens (12", EP)	2009
CT-023	Grass Widow	Grass Widow (12")	2009
CT-025	The Bitters	"East" (7", single)	2009
CT-026	Ganglians	"Blood On The Sand" (7")	2009
CT-027	Thee Oh Sees	Dog Poison (LP, album)	2009
CT-028	Spectrals	"Leave Me Be" (7", single)	2009
CT-029	Christmas Island	"Nineteen/Twenty-Nine" (7", single)	2009
CT-030	The German Measles	Wild E.P. (12")	2009
CT-031	Beachniks	"Beachniks" (7")	2009
CT-032	Silk Flowers	As Above So Below (12", mini-album)	2009
CT-033	Led Er Est	"Poll Gorm" (7")	2009
CT-034	The Girls at Dawn	The Girls at Dawn (12", EP)	2009
CT-035	Wild Nothing	"Summer Holiday" (7", single)	2009
CT-036	Veronica Falls	"Found Love in a Graveyard" (7", single)	2010
CT-037	Dignan Porch	"On a Ride"/"The Day Things Changed" (7", single)	2010
CT-038	Hanoi Janes	"Across the Sea"/"Skeleton Girl" (7", single)	2010
CT-039	Wetdog	"Lower Leg" (7")	2009
CT-040	Cosmetics	"Soft Skin" (7", Ltd)	2010
CT-041	Wetdog	Frauhaus! (LP)	2010
CT-042	Beach Fossils	"Daydream" (7")	2010
CT-044	The Beets	"Locomotion" (7", single)	2010
CT-045	Hanoi Janes	Year of Panic (LP/CD, Album)	2010
CT-046	The Fresh & Onlys	August in My Mind (12", Mini-album)	2010
CT-047	The Soft Moon	"Breathe the Fire" (7", single)	2010
CT-048	Minks	"Funeral Song" (7", single)	2010
CT-049	Wild Nothing	"Cloudbusting" (7")	2010
CT-050	Blank Dogs	Phrases (12", EP, single)	2010
CT-051	Dignan Porch	Tendrils (LP/CD, album)	2010
CT-052	La La Vasquez	"Hello" (7", single)	2010
CT-053	Girls Names	Girls Names (12", EP)	2010
CT-055	Cosmetics	"Sleepwalking" (7", single, Cle)	2010
CT-056	Blank Dogs	The Singles (cassette, comp, C60)	2010
CT-057	Blank Dogs	The EPs (cassette, comp)	2010
CT-058	Blank Dogs	"On Two Sides"/"The Fields" (cassette, comp)	2010
CT-059	Blank Dogs	Under and Under (2× cassette, album)	2010
CT-060	Blank Dogs	Leaves (cassette, Ltd, C10)	2010
CT-061	Soft Healer	"Gentle One" (7", single)	2010
CT-062	Tim Cohen	Laugh Tracks (LP, album)	2010
CT-063	Aias	"Aias"/"Canvis" (7", single)	2010
CT-067	Beach Fossils	Beach Fossils (LP/CD, Album)	2010
CT-068	Wild Nothing	Gemini (LP/CD, album)	2010
CT-069	Soft Metals	The Cold World Melts (12", Whi)	2010
CT-070	Hanoi Janes	"Specks Ho!" (7")	2010
CT-071	Minks	"Ophelia" (7", single)	2010
CT-072	The Soft Moon	"Parallels" (single)	2010
CT-073	The Monochrome Set	White Noice: Early Recordings, 1975–1977 (mini-album, comp)	2010
CT-074	Veronica Falls	"Beachy Head" (7")	2010
CT-075	Aias	A La Piscina (LP/CD, album)	2010
CT-079	Wild Nothing	Golden Haze (EP)	2010
CT-080	The Beets	Stay Home (12", EP)	2011
CT-081	Craft Spells	"Party Talk" (7")	2010
CT-082	Further Reductions	"Decidedly So"/"Not Unknown" (7")	2010
CT-083	Blank Dogs	Land and Fixed (LP/CD, album)	2010
CT-084	Beach Fossils	Face It/Distance (Single)	2010
CT-085	The Soft Moon	The Soft Moon (LP/CD, album)	2010
CT-086	Minks	By the Hedge (LP/CD, album)	2011
CT-087	The Jameses	Caribou (7")	2010
CT-088	Catwalk	(Please) Don't Break Me (7", single)	2010
CT-089	The Beets	Time Brought Age (7")	2011
CT-091	Tim Cohen	Tim Cohen's Magic Trick (LP/CD, album)	2011
CT-092	Dignan Porch	Deluded (EP)	2011
CT-093	Catwalk	"One by Words" (7", single)	2011
CT-094	Craft Spells	"After the Moment" (7")	2011
CT-095	Beach Fossils	What a Pleasure (EP)	2011
CT-096	Tim Cohen	Bad Blood (2×7", EP)	2011
CT-097	Minks	Araby (cassette, Ltd)	2011
CT-098	Widowspeak	"Harsh Realm"/"Burnout" (single)	2011
CT-099	Blouse	"Into Black"/"Firestarter"	2011
CT-100	Zodiacs	"Faraway Friend" (7")	2011
CT-101	Craft Spells	Idle Labor (LP/CD, album)	2011
CT-102	Led Er Est	May (12", EP)	2011
CT-103	The Wake	"On Our Honeymoon" (7", single)	2011
CT-104	The Wake	"Crush the Flowers" (7", single)	2011
CT-105	Beach Fossils & Wild Nothing	"Gruesome Flowers" (7")	2011
CT-106	Catwalk	The Yay! Recordings (cassette, comp)	2011
CT-107	Thieves Like Us	Your Love Runs Still EP (12")	2011
CT-108	Blank Dogs	Collected by Itself: 2006–2009 (comp)	2011
CT-109	Blank Dogs	On Two Sides (LP, album, Ltd, RE)	2011
CT-110	Jeff & Jane Hudson	Flesh (comp)	2011
CT-111	The Servants	Youth Club Disco (LP, album, comp)	2011
CT-112	Hoop Dreams	"XCPR" (7")	2011
CT-113	The McTells	The McTells (cassette, C30)	2011
CT-114	The McTells	Expecting Joe (cassette, C30)	2011
CT-115	Widowspeak	"Gun Shy" (single)	2011
CT-116	Soft Metals	Soft Metals (LP/CD, album)	2011
CT-117	Silk Flowers	Days of Arrest (EP)	2011
CT-118	Widowspeak	Widowspeak (LP/CD, album)	2011
CT-119	Thieves Like Us	Your Heart Feels (12")	2011
CT-120	Covergirl	"Paris Burns" (7")	2011
CT-121	Minks	"Araby" (7", single)	2011
CT-122	Heavenly Beat	"Suday" (7", single, Ltd, Whi)	2011
CT-123	DIIV	"Sometime" (single)	2011
CT-124	The Soft Moon	Total Decay (EP)	2011
CT-125	Blouse	Blouse (LP/CD, album)	2011
CT-126	Nick Nicely	Elegant Daze: 1979–1986 (LP, album, comp)	2011
CT-127	Should	A Folding Sieve (LP, Album, RE)	2011
CT-128	Deardarkhead	Oceanside: 1991–1993 (LP, Album, Comp)	2011
CT-129	Should	Resonate (cassette, Ltd)	2011
CT-130	Deardarkhead	Spiral Down and Vibrate (cassette, Ltd)	2011
CT-131	DIIV	"Human" (7")	2011
CT-132	Medicine	"Time Baby II" (7")	2011
CT-133	Heavenly Beat	Faithless (7")	2011
CT-134	Thieves Like Us	Berlin/Alex (LP, album)	2011
CT-135	Jesse Ruins	"A Bookshelf Sinks into the Sand" (7")	2011
CT-136	Grabbel and the Final Cut	"Get Your Feet Back on the Ground" (7")	2011
CT-137	Wild Nothing	"Nowhere" (7")	2012
CT-138	Jesse Ruins	Dream Analysis (12"EP/CD)	2012
CT-139	Beach Fossils	"Shallow" (7")	2012
CT-140	Mac DeMarco	Rock and Roll Nightclub (12"EP/CD)	2012
CT-141	Mac DeMarco	"Only You" (7")	2012
CT-142	Half String	Maps for Sleep (2xLP/CD)	2012
CT-143	Thieves Like Us	Bleed Bleed Bleed (LP/CD)	2012
CT-144	Holograms	"ABC City" (7")	2012
CT-145	The Cleaners from Venus	Blow Away Your Troubles (2×LP)	2012
CT-146	The Cleaners from Venus	On Any Normal Monday (LP)	2012
CT-147	The Cleaners from Venus	Midnight Cleaners (LP)	2012
CT-145-147	The Cleaners from Venus	The Cleaners from Venus Vol 1. (4×LP/3×CD)	2012
CT-148	Medicine	Shot Forth Self Living (2×LP/2×CD)	2012
CT-149	Medicine	The Buried Life (Expanded) (2xLP/2xCD)	2012
CT-150	Medicine	Sounds of Medicine (LP)	2012
CT-151	Medicine	Always Starting to Stop (cassette)	2012
CT-152	The Wake	Here Comes Everybody + singles (82–87)	2012
CT-153	Blouse & Craft Spells	"Gruesome Flowers 2: A Tribute to The Wake" (7")	2012
CT-154	DIIV	"Geist" (7")	2012
CT-155	Craft Spells	Gallery (EP)	2012
CT-156	The Soft Moon vs. John Foxx & the Maths	"Evidence" (7")	2012
CT-158	DIIV	Oshin	2012
CT-159	Holograms	Holograms (LP/CD, album)	2012
CT-160	Heavenly Beat	Talent (LP/CD)	2012
CT-161	Dignan Porch	Nothing Bad Will Ever Happen (LP/CD)	2012
CT-162	Wild Nothing	Nocturne	2012
CT-163	Chris Cohen	Overgrown Path	2012
CT-164	Mac DeMarco	2	2012
CT-165	The Soft Moon	Zeros (LP)	2012
CT-166	Naomi Punk	The Feeling (LP/CD)	2012
CT-167-169	For Against	For Against (LP box)	2013
CT-170	Widowspeak	Almanac (LP/CD)	2013
CT-171	Beach Fossils	Clash the Truth (LP/CD/cassette)	2013
CT-172	Alex Calder	Time (EP/CD)	2013
CT-173	Bona Dish	The Zaragoza Tapes: 1981–1982 (LP/CD)	2013
CT-174	Wild Nothing	Empty Estate (12-inch EP/CD)	2013
CT-175	The Cleaners from Venus	In the Golden Autumn (LP)	2013
CT-176	The Cleaners from Venus	Under Wartime Conditions (LP)	2013
CT-177	The Cleaners from Venus	Songs for a Fallow Land (LP)	2013
CT-178	The Cleaners from Venus	A Dawn Chorus (LP)	2013
CT-179	The Cleaners from Venus	The Cleaners from Venus Vol. 2 (LP box/4xCD)	2013
CT-180	Earth Dies Burning	Songs from the Valley of the Bored Teenager (1981–1984) (LP/CD)	2013
CT-181	Saada Bonaire	Saada Bonaire (2LP/CD)	2013
CT-182	Soft Metals	Lenses (LP/CD)	2013
CT-183	Medicine	To the Happy Few (LP/CD)	2013
CT-184	Minks	Tides End (LP/CD)	2013
CT-185	The Servants	Small Time / Hey Hey We're The Manqués (2LP)	2013
CT-186	Holograms	Forever (LP)	2013
CT-187	Blouse	Imperium (LP/CD)	2013
CT-188	Heavenly Beat	Prominence (LP/CD)	2013
CT-189	Widowspeak	The Swamps (EP)	2013
CT-190	Juan Wauters	N.A.P.: North American Poetry (LP/CD)	2014
CT-191	Axxa/Abraxas	Axxa/Abraxas (LP/CD)	2014
CT-192	Perfect Pussy	Say Yes to Love (LP/CD)	2014
CT-193	Mac DeMarco	Salad Days (LP/CD)	2014
CT-194	Milk N' Cookies	Not Enough Girls in the World b/w Nots (7-inch RSD Exclusive)	2014
CT-195	Medicine	Part Time Punks "In Session" Live LP (12-inch LP RSD Exclusive)	2014
CT-196	Bok Bok	Come Back to Me b/w Misfit (7-inch RSD Exclusive)	2014
CT-197	Skylon	Skylon v/w Skylon (Acoustic Demo) (7-inch RSD Exclusive)	2014
CT-198	Cosmetics	Olympia...Plus (12-inch LP RSD Exclusive)	2014
CT-199	The Snow	Memory Loss b/w Joy of Life (7-inch RSD Exclusive)	2014
CT-200	Craft Spells	Nausea (LP/CD)	2014
CT-201	Stockholm Monsters	All at Once (LP + 7")	2014
CT-202	The Cleaners from Venus	Living with Victoria Grey (LP)	2014
CT-203	The Cleaners from Venus	Number Thirteen (LP)	2014
CT-204	The Cleaners from Venus	My Back Wages (LP)	2014
CT-205	The Cleaners from Venus	Extra Wages (LP)	2014
CT-202-205	The Cleaners from Venus	The Cleaners from Venus Vol.3 (4xLP/4xCD)	2014
CT-206	The Apartments	The Evening Visits...And Stays for Years (2xLP/2xCD)	2015
CT-207	Donovan Blanc	Donovan Blanc (LP/CD)	2014
CT-208	The Outsiders	Close Up (LP)	2014
CT-209	Naomi Punk	Television Man (LP/CD)	2014
CT-210	Shiny Two Shiny	When the Rain Stops (LP/CD)	2014
CT-211	Juan Wauters & Carmelle	Wearing Leather, Wearing Fur (12-inch EP)	2015
CT-212	Medicine	Home Everywhere (LP/CD)	2014
CT-213	Alex Calder	Strange Dreams (LP/CD)	2014
CT-214	Perfect Pussy	I Have Lost All Desire for Feeling (12-inch EP/CD)	2015
CT-216	Mourn	Mourn (LP/CD)	2015
CT-217	Nic Hessler	Soft Connections (LP/CD)	2015
CT-218	The Soft Moon	Deeper (LP/CD)	2015
CT-219	Pale Blue	The Past We Leave Behind (2xLP/CD)	2015
CT-220	David Westlake	Play Dusty for Me (LP)	2015
CT-221	Alex Calder	Mold Boy (LP)	2015
CT-222	Martin Newell	Teatime Assortment (2xLP/CD)	2015
CT-224	Juan Wauters	Who Me? (LP/CD)	2015
CT-225	EZTV	Dust in the Sky (7")	2015
CT-226	EZTV	Calling Out (LP/CD)	2015
CT-227	Mourn	Gertrudis, Get Through This! (7")	2015
CT-228	Mac DeMarco	Another One (Mini LP/CD)	2015
CT-230	Widowspeak	All Yours (LP/CD)	2015
CT-231	DIIV	Is the Is Are (LP/CD)	2016
CT-232	Wild Nothing	Life of Pause (LP/CD)	2016
CT-235	Luna	Lunapark (as a part of CTBOX-005 'Long Players 92–99' LP Box Set)	2016
CT-236	Luna	Bewitched (as a part of CTBOX-005 'Long Players 92–99' LP Box Set)	2016
CT-237	Luna	Penthouse (as a part of CTBOX-005 'Long Players 92–99' LP Box Set)	2016
CT-238	Luna	Pup Tent (as a part of CTBOX-005 'Long Players 92–99' LP Box Set)	2016
CT-239	Luna	Days of Our Nights (as a part of CTBOX-005 'Long Players 92–99' LP Box Set)	2016
CT-240	Luna	Rarities (as a part of CTBOX-005 'Long Players 92–99' LP Box Set)	2016
CT-242	Lina Tullgren	Wishlist EP (12")	2016
CT-243	Mourn	Ha, Ha, He. (LP/CD)	2016
CT-244	B Boys	No Worry No Mind EP (12"/CD)	2016
CT-245	Boulevards	Groove (LP/CD)	2016
CT-246	Dinner	Psychic Lovers (LP/CD)	2016
CT-247	Chris Cohen	As If Apart (LP/CD)	2016
CT-248	Chris Cohen	"One Demonstration and One Cover" (7")	2016
CT-249	Brotherhood of Lizards	Lizardland (2xLP/CD)	2016
CT-250	EZTV	High in Place (LP/CD)	2016
CT-251	Molly Burch	"Downhearted" (7")	2016
CT-252	The Stray Trolleys	Barricades and Angels (LP/CD)	2017
CT-253	Molly Burch	Please Be Mine (LP/CD)	2017
CT-254	Alex Calder	Alex Calder (LP)	2017
CT-255	Chastity	TAPE (cassette)	2017
CT-256	Chastity	"Peroxide" (7")	2017
CT-257	Lina Tullgren	Won (LP/CD)	2017
CT-258	B Boys	Dada (LP/CD)	2017
CT-259	Cleaners from Venus	Best of... (LP)	2017
CT-260	Mac DeMarco	This Old Dog (LP/CD)	2017
CT-261	Reptaliens	"Prequel" (7")	2017
CT-262	Gabriella Cohen	Full Closure and No Details (LP/CD)	2017
CT-264	The 6th's	Wasp's Nest (LP)	2017
CT-265	Naomi Punk	Yellow (2xLP/CD)	2017
CT-266	Widowspeak	Expect the Best (LP/CD)	2017
CT-267	Dinner	New Work (LP/CD)	2017
CT-268	Reptaliens	FM-2030 (LP/CD)	2017
CT-269	Chastity	Chains EP (12")	2017
CT-270	Wax Chattels	"Stay Disappointed" (7")	2017
CT-271	Martin Newell	The Greatest Living Englishman (LP)	2017
CT-272	Robert Earl Thomas	Another Age (LP/CD)	2018
CT-273	Wax Chattels	Wax Chattels (LP/CD)	2018
CT-274	Gabriella Cohen	Pink is the Colour of Unconditional Love (LP/CD)	2018
CT-277	Capital Punishment	Roadkill (LP/CD)	2018
CT-278	Mourn	Sorpresa Familia (LP/CD)	2018
CT-279	Chastity	Death Lust (LP/CD)	2018
CT-280	Molly Burch	First Flower (LP/CD)	2018
CT-281	Various Artists	CT10 Sampler Volume 1 (LP)	2018
CT-282	Wild Nothing	Indigo (LP/CD)	2018
CT-283	Lina Tullgren	"Always Fine" (7")	2018
CT-287	Drahla	A Compact Cassette (cassette)	2018
CT-288	Drahla	"Twelve Divisions of the Day" (7")	2018
CT-289	Various Artists	CT10 Sampler Volume 2 (LP)	2018
CT-290	Capital Punishment	This Is Capital Punishment EP (12")	2018
CT-291	EZTV	"Daytime" (digital single)	2018
CT-292	Reptaliens	"Echo Park" (7")	2018
CT-294	HXXS	MKDRONE EP (12")	2018
CT-295	Chris Cohen	Chris Cohen (LP/CD)	2019
CT-296	Drahla	Useless Coordinates (LP/CD)	2019
CT-297	Juan Wauters	La Onda de Juan Pablo (LP/CD)	2019
CT-298	Juan Wauters	Introducing Juan Pablo (LP/CD)	2019
CT-300	DIIV	Deceiver (LP/CD)	2019
CT-301	Reptaliens	VALIS (LP/CD)	2019
CT-303	Anders Rhedin	Kyoto Window (cassette)	2019
CT-304	Anders Rhedin	Guided Sleep Meditation (digital)	2019
CT-305	Anders Rhedin	The City That Sleeps (digital)	2019
CT-306	Anders Rhedin	Images (digital)	2019
CT-308	Chastity	Death Lust Cuts (digital EP)	2019
CT-309	Lina Tullgren	Free Cell (LP/CD)	2019
CT-310	B Boys	Dudu (LP/CD)	2019
CT-312	HXXS	Year of the Witch (LP/CD)	2019
CT-313	Chastity	Home Made Satan (LP/CD)	2019
CT-314	Molly Burch	Ballads (7")	2019
CT-315	Molly Burch	The Molly Burch Christmas Album	2019
CT-316	Locate S,1	Personalia (LP/CD)	2020
CT-317	Becca Mancari	The Greatest Part (LP/CD)	2020
CT-318	Widowspeak	Plum (LP/CD)	2020
CT-319	Wax Chattels	Clot (LP/CD)	2020
CT-320	Ben Chatrer	"What Have I Done!" (7")	2020
CT-321	The Shifters	"Left Bereft" (7")	2020
CT-326	Becca Mancari	The Greatest Part (CD)	2020
CT-327	Mourn	Self Worth (LP/CD)	2020
CT-330	Molly Burch	"Emotion" (7")	2021
CT-340	Widowspeak	Honeychurch EP (digital)	2021
CT-335	Linda Smith	Till Another Time: 1988–1996 (LP/CD)	2021
CT-336	Martin Newell	The Off White Album (LP)	2021
CT-342	Becca Mancari	Juniata EP (digital)	2021
CT-343	JayWood	Some Days EP (digital)	2021
CT-338	Juan Wauters	Real Life Situations (LP/CD)	2021
CT-333	Molly Burch	Romantic Images (LP/CD)	2021
CT-345	Dinner	Dream Work (LP/CD)	2021
CT-321	Mouth Congress	Waiting For Henry (LP/CD)	2021
CT-344	Reptaliens	Multiverse (LP/CD)	2022
CT-347	Widowspeak	The Jacket (LP/CD)	2022
CT-346	Saâda Bonaire	1992 (LP/CD)	2022
CT-347	Widowspeak	The Jacket	2022
CT-348	JayWood	Slingshot	2022
CT-349	Scout Gillett	No Roof No Floor (LP/CD)	2022
CT-350	DIIV	Oshin	2022
CT-351	THUS LOVE	Memorial (LP/CD)	2022
CT-352	Mac DeMarco	2	2022
CT-353	DIIV	"Sometime" / "Human" / "Geist" (box with three 7" singles)	2022
CT-354	Scout Gillett	one to ten	2022
CT-355	Kate Fagan	I Don't Wanna Be Too Cool (Expanded Edition)	2023
CT-357	Locate S,1	Wicked Jaw	2023
CT-358	The Lemon Twigs	Everything Harmony (LP/CD)	2023
CT-360	Juan Wauters	Wandering Rebel	2023
CT-361	Molly Burch	Daydreamer	2023
CT-362	Wild Nothing	Hold	2023
CT-363	Becca Mancari	Left Hand	2023
CT-369	Drahla	angeltape	2024
CT-370	Linda Smith	Nothing Else Matters	2024
CT-371	Linda Smith	I So Liked Spring	2024
CT-374	THUS LOVE	All Pleasure	2024
CT-375	The Lemon Twigs	A Dream Is All We Know (LP/CD)	2024
CT-376	GIFT	Illuminator	2024
CT-381	girlpuppy	Sweetness	2025
CT-383	JayWood	LEO NEGRO	2025
CT-386	Juan Wauters	MVD LUV	2025
CT-387	Anders Rhedin	Water Songs	2025
CT-390	The Lemon Twigs	Look for Your Mind! (LP/CD)	2026
