= Crystal Cross =

- Theatrical release poster
- Directed by: Richie James Follin
- Written by: Richie James Follin
- Produced by: Richie James Follin Peter Hagan
- Starring: Rubyrose Hill; Richie James Follin; Missi Pyle; Samantha Robinson; Lukas Haas; Luke Baines; David Lowe; Barbara Williams; Eric Kelly; Kayla Anjali
- Cinematography: Mauro Fernandez
- Edited by: Peter Hagan
- Music by: Richie Follin (score); Guards (songs)
- Production companies: American Rhapsody; Seventh Symphony
- Release date: October 23, 2025 (Austin Film Festival)
- Running time: 88 minutes
- Country: United States
- Language: English

Crystal Cross is a 2025 American romantic black comedy drama film written and directed by Richie James Follin. It stars Rubyrose Hill, Missi Pyle, Samantha Robinson, Lukas Haas, Luke Baines, David Lowe, Barbara Williams, and Follin. The film features an all original soundtrack written by Follin's band Guards.

The film premiered at the Austin Film Festival on October 23, 2025, where it won the Audience Award for Comedy Vanguard.

It was announced via Indiewire on Jan 6th, 2026 that "Crystal Cross" would be included on The Popcorn List as "one of the best films of 2026 festival circuit without wider distribution".

== Premise ==
Dotty, an aspiring Christian music singer, ends up on a cross-country road trip with James, a grieving father who intends to end his life when they reach their destination. The two bond as their trip introduces them to a series of odd characters and unlikely situations.

== Cast ==
- Rubyrose Hill as Dotty
- Richie James Follin as James
- Missi Pyle as The Therapist
- Samantha Robinson as the Blonde
- Lukas Haas as Simon
- Luke Baines as Jaques
- David Lowe as the neighbor
- Barbara Williams as the doctor
- Eric Kelly as the drug dealer
- Kayla Anjali as Selene

== Production ==
In August 2025, it was announced that Richie James Follin had written, directed, and composed a romantic black comedy drama film titled Crystal Cross, starring Rubyrose Hill, Missi Pyle, Samantha Robinson, Lukas Haas, Luke Baines, David Lowe, Barbara Williams, and Follin.

== Release ==
Crystal Cross premiered at the Austin Film Festival on October 23, 2025. The film has also screened at the LA Skins Film Festival (the largest Native American film fest in the world), Beverly Hills Film Festival, Brooklyn Film Festival, Tallgrass Film Festival, Anchorage International Film Festival, Seattle International Film Festival, Phoenix Film Festival, Riverrun International Film Festival, Dallas International Film Festival, Florida Film Festival, Nashville Film Festival, Stony Brook Film Festival, Riverbend Film Festival, Mystic Film Festival, Calgary International Film Festival, Catalina Film Festival, St.Louis International Film Festival, The Portland Festival of Cinema, Animation & Technology (PFCAT), Cinema Columbus, Monadnock International Film Festival, Credo 23 Film Festival, Richmond International Film Festival, Hell's Half Mile Music and Film Festival, Bozeman Film Festival, Religion Today Film Festival.

== Accolades ==
Year	Award	Category	Nominee(s)	Result	Ref
2025	Austin Film Festival	Comedy Vanguard Audience Award for Narrative Feature	Richie James Follin for Crystal Cross	Won	
2025	LA Skins Film Festival	Achievement In Filmmaking	Richie James Follin for Crystal Cross	Won	
2026	Nashville Film Festival	Grand Jury Prize for New Directors Competition	Richie James Follin for Crystal Cross	Won	
2026	Seattle International Film Festival	Grand Jury Prize New American Cinema Competition	Richie James Follin for Crystal Cross	Nominated	
2026	Stony Brook Film Festival	The Spirit of Independent Filmmaking Award	Richie James Follin for Crystal Cross	Won	
2026	Brooklyn Film Festival	Audience Award for Narrative Feature	Richie James Follin for Crystal Cross	Won	
2026	Brooklyn Film Festival	Spirit Award for Narrative Feature	Richie James Follin for Crystal Cross	Won	
2026	Riverrun International Film Festival	Jury Prize for Vision Independent Feature Competition	Richie James Follin for Crystal Cross	Nominated	
2026	Richmond International Film Festival	Best Music for Narrative Feature	Richie James Follin for Crystal Cross	Won	
2026	Westsound Film Festival	Best Cinematography for Narrative Feature	Mauro Fernandez for Crystal Cross	Won	
2026	Tallgrass Film Festival	Audience Favorite Narrative Feature	Richie James Follin for Crystal Cross	Won	
2026	Bozeman Film Festival	Audience Award for Narrative Feature	Richie James Follin for Crystal Cross	Won	
2026	Cinema Columbus	Jury Award for Best Feature	Richie James Follin for Crystal Cross	Won	
2026	Catalina Film Festival	Best Ensemble Cast for a Feature	Crystal Cross	Nominated	
2026	Catalina Film Festival	Best Cinematography for Narrative Feature	Mauro Fernandez	Nominated	
2026	Religion Today Film Festival	International Jury for Narrative Feature	Crystal Cross	Special Mention	
2026	Riverbend Film Festival	Spirit of the Fest	Richie James Follin for Crystal Cross	Won	
2026	Florida Film Festival	Grand Jury Best Narrative Feature	Richie James Follin for Crystal Cross	Nominated	
2026	Yucca Valley Film Festival	Best Feature Film	Richie James Follin for Crystal Cross	Won	
