= Host (Cults album) =

2020 studio album by Cults

Studio album by Cults
- Released: September 18, 2020
- Studios: Lone Palm; Sonora; Diamond Mine; Thunderdome; Bertram's Bedroom; Rehab
- Length: 41:17
- Label: Sinderlyn
- Producers: Cults; Shane Stoneback

Cults chronology
Offering (2017)	Host (2020)	To the Ghosts (2024)

Host is the fourth studio album by American indie pop band Cults, released on September 18, 2020, by Sinderlyn.

== Reception ==
Professional ratings
Aggregate scores
Source	Rating
Metacritic	75/100
Review scores
Source	Rating
AllMusic	4/5 stars
Pitchfork	6.8/10
Atwood Magazine	—
Beats Per Minute	61%

Host received generally favorable reviews from several mainstream critic websites. At Metacritic, which assigns a normalized rating out of 100 to reviews from mainstream critics, the album has received an average score of 75 out of 100, which indicates "Generally Favorable Reviews," based on 7 reviews.

== Track listing ==
All tracks are written by Madeline Follin and Brian Oblivion.

No.	Title	Length
1.	"Trials"	3:24
2.	"8th Avenue"	3:21
3.	"Spit You Out"	3:52
4.	"A Low"	4:03
5.	"No Risk"	2:33
6.	"Working It Over"	4:36
7.	"A Purgatory"	3:17
8.	"Like I Do"	3:43
9.	"Masquerading"	2:47
10.	"Honest Love"	2:23
11.	"Shoulders to My Feet"	3:35
12.	"Monolithic"	3:39

== Personnel ==
=== Cults ===
- Madeline Follin – vocals, production
- Brian Oblivion – vocals, guitar, bass, keyboards, production

=== Additional contributors ===
- Shane Stoneback – production, engineering
- Heba Kadry – mastering
- John Congleton – mixing
- Doug Boehm – additional strings recording
- Max Kamins – engineering assistance (all tracks), bass (tracks 1, 2)
- Jon Safley – percussion (tracks 1–7, 9, 10, 12)
- Tess Scott-Suhrstedt – viola (tracks 1, 2, 4–7, 10, 12), violin (1, 5, 7, 10, 12)
- Mia Barcia-Colombo – cello (tracks 1, 2, 4, 5)
- Loren Humphrey – drums (tracks 1, 2, 8, 11)
- Will McLaren – guitar (tracks 1, 4, 5)
- Ricky Lucchese – trombone (tracks 2, 3, 6, 9)
- John Eatherly – drums (tracks 3–7, 9, 10, 12)
- Paige Boehm – cello (tracks 3, 8)
- Richie James Follin – slide guitar (track 4)
- Adam Gil – guitar (tracks 6, 11, 12)
- Ben Tipton – artwork
- Patrick Fernandes – layout
