= Midnight Snack (album) =

Studio album by Homeshake
- Released: September 18, 2015
- Genres: Indie pop; dream pop; R&B
- Length: 33:14
- Label: Sinderlyn
- Producer: Peter Sagar

Homeshake chronology
In the Shower (2014)	Midnight Snack (2015)	Fresh Air (2017)

Midnight Snack is the second studio album by Canadian recording project Homeshake. It was released on September 18, 2015 through Captured Tracks-affiliated record label, Sinderlyn.

Described as an indie pop and electro-R&B record, Midnight Snack emphasizes the R&B influence evident on previous recordings, adding drum machines and synthesizers along with the live drums and guitars.

== Critical reception ==
Professional ratings
Review scores
Source	Rating
AllMusic	3.5/5 stars
Exclaim!	8/10

The album received positive reviews from music critics. AllMusic critic Paul Simpson gave a positive review, describing Midnight Snack as "a decent, creative late-night downer record that finds Sagar successfully incorporating new elements into Homeshake's sound, resulting in the project's most assured material yet." Exclaim!'s Cosette Schulz wrote: "These recordings are bare bones, just Sagar, a synth and a drum machine, and the easy-listening simplicity makes it all the more enjoyable."

== Track listing ==
1. "What Did He Look Like?" – 0:58
2. "Heat" – 3:15
3. "He's Heating Up!" – 2:55
4. "I Don't Wanna" – 2:40
5. "Faded" – 3:34
6. "Love Is Only a Feeling" – 2:48
7. "Under the Sheets" – 3:43
8. "Real Love" – 2:23
9. "Move This Body" – 3:24
10. "Give It to Me" – 3:08
11. "Midnight Snack" – 2:54
12. "Good Night" – 1:32

== Personnel ==
- Peter Sagar – music, production
- Salina Ladha – artwork
