= The Face of Horror =

British horror film

- Directed by: Anna Biller
- Screenplay by: Anna Biller
- Based on: Yotsuya Kaidan
- Produced by: Anna Biller; Mike Goodridge; James Bowsher
- Starring: Jonah Hauer-King; Kristine Froseth; Ellie Bamber; Leo Suter; Bella Heathcote; Ben Radcliffe
- Cinematography: M. David Mullen
- Edited by: Anna Biller
- Music by: Gabriel Andrés Gallegos
- Production companies: Good Chaos; Sirena Films
- Release date: 11 September 2026 (TIFF)
- Running time: 120 minutes
- Country: United Kingdom
- Language: English

The Face of Horror is a 2026 British horror film written, directed, co-produced and edited by Anna Biller, based upon the Japanese ghost story Yotsuya Kaidan. It stars Jonah Hauer-King, Kristine Froseth, Leo Suter and Ellie Bamber.

The film had its world premiere in the Midnight Madness program at the 2026 Toronto International Film Festival on 11 September 2026.

== Premise ==
Set in the 14th century, an unfaithful widower is haunted by his former wife after her death.

== Cast ==
- Jonah Hauer-King as Edward
- Kristine Froseth as Eleanor
- Ellie Bamber as Beatrice
- Leo Suter as Richard
- Bella Heathcote as Isabel
- Ben Radcliffe as Roger

== Production ==
=== Development ===
The film was written and directed by Anna Biller, and was adapted from the Japanese ghost story Yotsuya Kaidan. It was produced by Biller with Mike Goodridge and James Bowsher for the production companies Good Chaos and Bluebeard Pictures, with production also coming from Sirena Films. M. David Mullen was director of photography, having worked previously with Biller on her 2016 film The Love Witch. The film had its world premiere at the Toronto International Film Festival, in the Midnight Madness section.

=== Casting ===
The cast is led by Jonah Hauer-King, Kristine Froseth and Ellie Bamber with Leo Suter, Bella Heathcote and Ben Radcliffe.

=== Filming ===
Principal photography took place in Prague through the summer of 2025, starting in July. First-look images from the set were released in September of that year.

=== Music ===
The original orchestral score was composed and conducted by Gabriel Andrés Gallegos. Recording sessions took place at Czech Television Studio in April 2026.

== Reception ==
On the review aggregator website Rotten Tomatoes, 83% of 23 critics' reviews are positive, with an average rating of 7.20/10.
