= Fresh Air (Homeshake album) =

Studio album by Homeshake
- Released: February 3, 2017
- Genres: R&B; synthpop
- Length: 43:13
- Labels: Royal Mountain; Sinderlyn
- Producer: Peter Sagar

Homeshake chronology
Midnight Snack (2015)	Fresh Air (2017)	Helium (2019)

Fresh Air is the third studio album by Canadian recording project Homeshake. It was released on February 3, 2017 through Royal Mountain Records in Canada and Sinderlyn in the United States. The first track off the album, "Call Me Up", was premiered on November 1, 2016.

Musically, the album expands on the electronic R&B sound of the previous record Midnight Snack (2015) and incorporates yacht rock influences for a "thrift store synth-pop sound."

== Critical reception ==
Professional ratings
Aggregate scores
Source	Rating
Metacritic	76/100
Review scores
Source	Rating
AllMusic	3.5/5 stars
Clash	8/10
Exclaim!	8/10
Pitchfork	7.3/10

The album generally received positive reviews from music critics. At Metacritic, which assigns a rating out of 100 to reviews from mainstream critics, the album has received an average score of 76, based on 4 reviews, indicating "generally favorable reviews".

AllMusic critic Paul Simpson thought that "the album's best moments are essentially the ones where he channels Prince," writing: "Sagar seems trapped at home and unable to break free from everything that's holding him down, but he's doing his best to get by." Noveen Bajpai of Clash described the album as "his [Sagar's] most confidently obtuse and complete record yet " Exclaim!'s Cosette Schulz stated: "Calm, cool and collected, Fresh Air is a record you'll have playing in the background while you light a candle, anticipating your lover's knock at the door." Pitchfork critic Kevin Lozano thought that the album lacks "cohesive pacing." Nevertheless, Lozano also further wrote: "While there isn’t quite anyone who possesses Sagar’s style in the wide world of indie rock, he’ll have to add a few more tricks, lest he fall into rote routine."

== Track listing ==
No.	Title	Length
1.	"Hello Welcome"	1:04
2.	"Call Me Up"	2:29
3.	"Not U"	2:47
4.	"Every Single Thing"	2:36
5.	"Wrapping Up"	3:47
6.	"Getting Down, Pt. II (He's Cooling Down)"	2:03
7.	"Timing"	3:34
8.	"TV Volume"	2:57
9.	"Khmlwugh"	3:35
10.	"Fresh Air"	6:07
11.	"Serious"	3:00
12.	"So She"	3:27
13.	"This Way"	5:33
14.	"Signing Off"	0:14
