= Eric Kelly =

Eric Kelly may refer to:

- Eric Kelly (American football) (born 1977), former American football cornerback
- Eric Kelly (boxer) (born 1980), four-time national boxing champion, celebrity trainer, correspondent
- Eric P. Kelly (1884–1960), American journalist, academic and author of children's books
