= Cults (band) =

American indie pop band

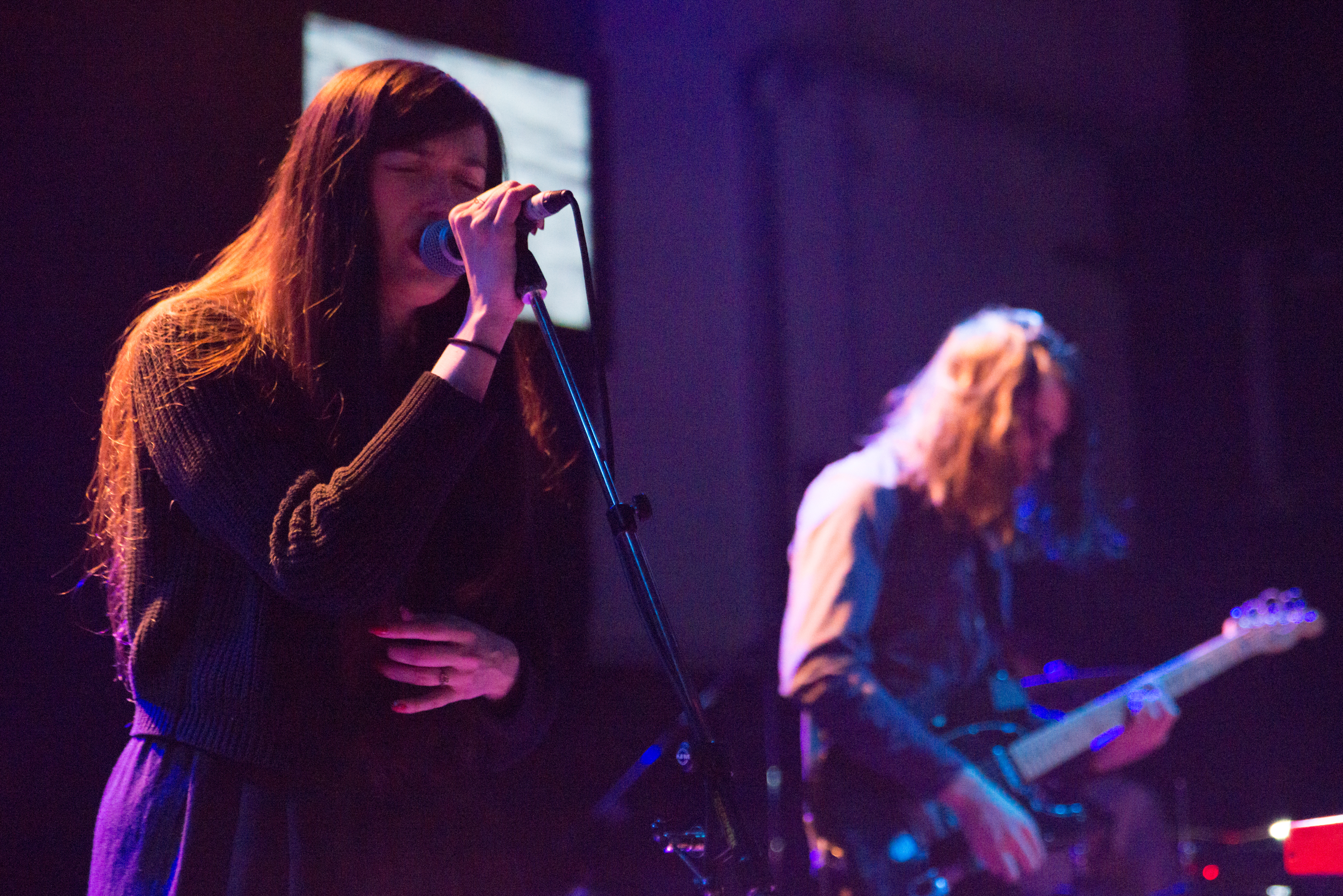
- Madeline Follin and Brian Oblivion performing in 2014

Background information
- Origin: Manhattan, New York, U.S.
- Genres: Indie pop; indie rock; dream pop; synth-rock; twee pop; experimental pop; psychedelic pop
- Years active: 2010–present
- Labels: In the Name Of; Columbia; Sinderlyn; Imperial
- Members: Brian Oblivion; Madeline Follin
- Website: cultscultscults.com

Cults is an American indie pop band formed in New York City in 2010, comprising multi-instrumentalists Madeline Follin (born 1988) and Brian Oblivion (born 1989). The band first rose to prominence after the release of their debut extended play, Cults 7" (2010), which was released on their Bandcamp page. They signed with English singer Lily Allen's record label In the Name Of, an imprint of Sony Music, to release their eponymous debut studio album (2011). Their song "Bad Things" was sampled by American rapper J. Cole for his 2013 single "She Knows", on which they were credited as featured artists.

The band has since released another four albums: Static (2013), Offering (2017), Host (2020) and To the Ghosts (2024), as well as an EP, Motels (2018).

== History ==
Cults was formed in 2010 while guitarist Brian Oblivion and singer Madeline Follin, both from San Diego, were students in New York City. Oblivion went to New York University to study documentary cinema, while Follin went to The New School. Follin had previously recorded with punk band Youth Gone Mad on the album Touching Cloth. The name Cults was inspired by the Heaven's Gate cult from San Diego, California, where Follin and Oblivion grew up.

Cults released an EP on Forrest Family Records, Cults 7", with the track "Go Outside" recorded by Paul Kostabi at Thunderdome Studios, and the album earned the title of "Best New Music" by Pitchfork. They toured supporting The Richie Follin's Band with overlapping members for six months before signing to ITNO/Sony. Their song "Go Outside" had a music video which starred Emma Roberts and Dave Franco. Another music video for the song featured the band intercut with footage of Jim Jones and Jonestown.

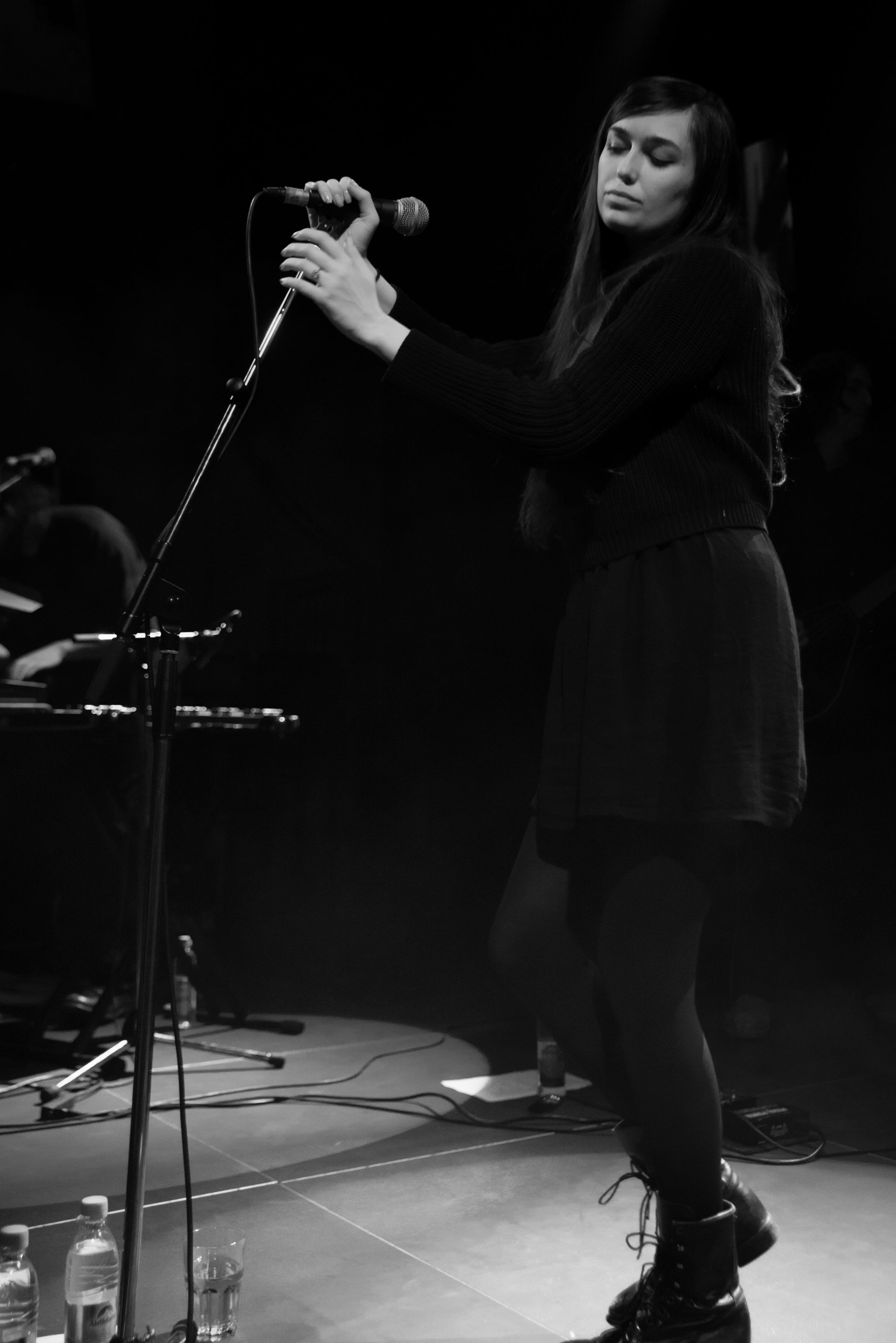
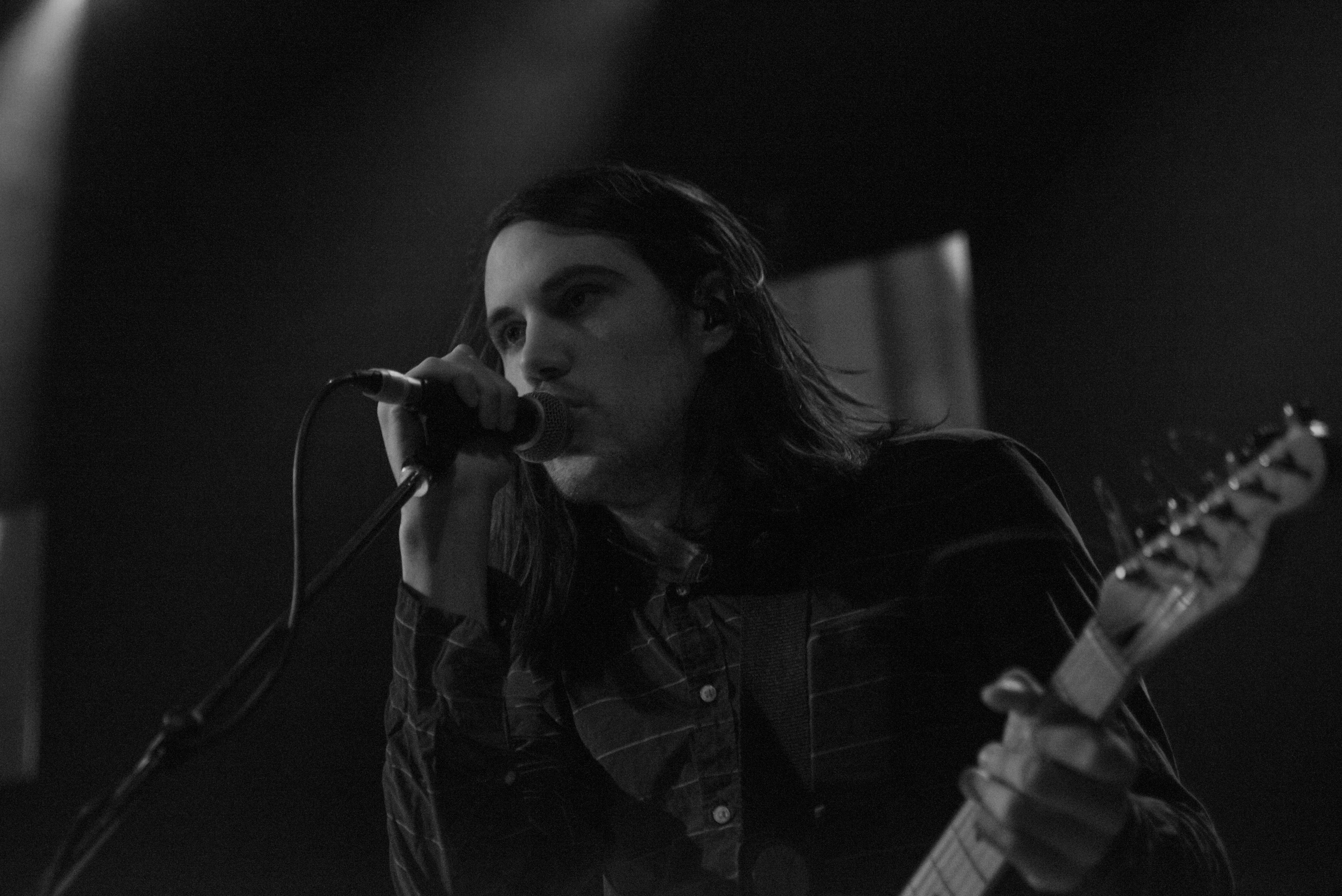
Follin (left) and Oblivion (right) performing in Munich in 2014

Their eponymous debut studio album was released on June 7, 2011, by Columbia Records' imprint In the Name Of run by Lily Allen. The album received generally positive reviews, and a second "Best New Music" from Pitchfork was earned for the track "Abducted". The same year, Cults collaborated with the group Superhuman Happiness on a version of the track "Um Canto De Afoxé para o Bloco Do Ilê" for the Red Hot Organization's most recent charity album Red Hot+Rio 2. The album is a follow-up to the 1996 Red Hot + Rio. Proceeds from sales were donated toward causes raising awareness of AIDS/HIV and related health and social issues. The band was chosen to perform at the All Tomorrow's Parties I'll Be Your Mirror festival curated by ATP and Portishead in September 2011 in Asbury Park, New Jersey. They were also chosen by Battles to perform at the ATP Nightmare Before Christmas festival that they co-curated in December 2011 in Minehead, England. In early 2012, Cults played the Australasian music festival Laneways. In an interview with 3news, they said people could expect a more "aggressive sound" with a lot of changes being made to songs as a five-piece band. In an interview with the magazine Coup De Main, Follin was quoted saying that "You Know What I Mean" was her favorite song on their self-titled debut album.

In 2013, they were featured alongside Amber Coffman on J. Cole's Born Sinner album which peaked at number one on the Billboard 200. The song later peaked at number 90 on the Billboard Hot 100. On October 15, 2013, the band released their second album, Static, in the aftermath of the duo's breakup, to generally favorable reviews. Cults supported both Pixies and Vampire Weekend on their respective North American tours in 2014.

In 2016, Follin collaborated with her brother Richie James Follin of rock band Guards on a side project called Follin. Their self-titled EP was released on April 15, 2016, which contains the songs "Memories" and "Roxy".

On October 6, 2017, the band released their third album, Offering. Their song "Gilded Lily", although not selected as a single for the album, became a huge success on social media platform TikTok in 2022.

On September 18, 2020, the band released their fourth album, Host. On August 17, 2021, their single "Always Forever" was certified gold by the Recording Industry Association of America (RIAA) and later was certified platinum on July 18, 2022. Their fifth album To the Ghosts was released on July 26, 2024. The deluxe edition came out a year later, on September 12, 2025, and contains four new songs : "Mark My Words", "Compaction", "Noises They Make" and "Tiffany".

== Band members ==
- Brian Oblivion (Ryan Michael Mattos) – vocals, guitars, keyboards, bass guitar, percussion, production
- Madeline Follin McKenna – vocals, guitars, keyboards, bass guitar, drums, percussion, production

=== Current touring members ===
- John Eatherly – drums
- Max Kamins – bass guitar
- Cory Stier – drums
- Marc Deriso – drums
- Loren Humphrey – drums

=== Former touring members ===
- Nathan Aguilar – bass guitar
- Richie Follin – guitars
- Gabriel Rodriguez – guitars

== Discography ==
=== Albums ===
List of studio albums and with selected chart positions
Title	Details	Peak chart positions			
Title	Details	US	CAN	LTU	UK
Cults	Released: June 7, 2011; Label: Sony; Formats: Digital download, streaming, CD, vinyl	52	89	—	133
Static	Released: October 15, 2013; Label: Sony; Formats: Digital download, streaming, CD, vinyl	114	—	—	—
Offering	Released: October 6, 2017; Label: Sinderlyn; Formats: Digital download, streaming, CD, vinyl, cassette	—	—	61	—
Motels	Released: September 7, 2018; Label: Sinderlyn; Formats: Vinyl, digital download	—	—	—	—
Host	Released: September 18, 2020; Label: Sinderlyn; Formats: Digital download, streaming, CD, vinyl	—	—	—	—
To the Ghosts	Released: July 26, 2024; Label: Imperial; Formats: Digital download, streaming, CD, vinyl	—	—	—	—
"—" denotes a recording that did not chart or was not released in that territory.

=== Extended plays ===
List of extended plays
Title	Year
Offering B-Sides & Remixes	Released: November 19, 2018; Label: Sinderlyn; Formats: Digital download, streaming
Host B-Sides & Remixes	Released: September 9, 2022; Label: Sinderlyn; Formats: Digital download, streaming

=== Singles ===
==== As lead artist ====
Title	Year	Peak chart positions	Album
Title	Year	UK Sales	Album
"Um Canto De Afoxé Para O Bloco Do Ilê" (with Superhuman Happiness)	2011	—	Non-album single
"Abducted"	2011	—	Cults
"Go Outside"	2011	12	Cults
"You Know What I Mean"	2011	63	Cults
"High Road"	2013	—	Static
"Being It"	2014	—	Non-album single
"Offering"	2017	—	Offering
"I Took Your Picture"	2017	—	Offering
"Right Words"	2017	—	Offering
"Spit You Out"	2020	—	Host
"Trials"	2020	—	Host
"No Risk"	2020	—	Host
"Monolithic"	2020	—	Host
"Bourgeois"	2021	—	Non-album single
"Beach Ball"	2021	—	Cults (10th Anniversary Edition)
"Make Time"	2021	—	Cults (10th Anniversary Edition)
"Valentine"	2022	—	Cults (10th Anniversary Edition)
"Poodles Dancing"	2022	—	Host B-Sides & Remixes
"Crybaby"	2024	—	To the Ghosts
"Left My Keys"	2024	—	To the Ghosts
"Hung the Moon"	2024	—	To the Ghosts
"—" denotes a recording that did not chart.

==== As featured artist ====
List of singles as featured artist, with selected chart positions and certifications
Title	Year	Peak chart positions								Certifications	Album
Title	Year	US	US R&B /HH	US Rap	LTU	SCO	UK	UK R&B	WW	Certifications	Album
"Bowl Cut" (DoM featuring Madeline of Cults)	2011	—	—	—	—	—	—	—	—		Non-album single
"She Knows" (J. Cole featuring Amber Coffman and Cults)	2013	90	24	11	47	77	68	10	175	BPI: Platinum	Born Sinner
"Moonshine" (Chewing featuring Cults)	2018	—	—	—	—	—	—	—	—		Pacific Ocean Blue
"—" denotes a recording that did not chart or was not released in that territory.

=== Other charted songs and certified songs ===
List of other charted songs, showing year charted, selected chart positions, and name of the album
Title	Year	Peak chart positions							Certifications	Album
Title	Year	US Bub.	US Rock	CAN	LTU	NLD Tip	NZ Hot	UK Indie	Certifications	Album
"Always Forever"	2013	—	—	—	—	—	—	—	RIAA: Platinum; BPI: Gold; RMNZ: Platinum	Static
"Gilded Lily"	2017	12	14	81	49	16	35	9	RIAA: Platinum; BPI: Gold; MC: Platinum; RMNZ: Platinum	Offering
"—" denotes a recording that did not chart or was not released in that territory.

=== Guest appearances ===
List of non-single guest appearances, with other performing artists, showing year released and album name
Title	Year	Other artist(s)	Album
"Sail It Slow"	2010	Guards	Guards

=== Production and songwriting credits ===
Title(s)	Year(s)	Artist(s)	Credit(s)
"NDL Overture" (featuring Niko Omilana & Miles Away)	2021	CTI	Producers & writers

== Awards and nominations ==
=== Berlin Music Video Awards ===
The Berlin Music Video Awards is an international festival that promotes music videos.

Year	Nominated work	Award	Result	Ref.
2025	"Onions"	Most Bizarre	Nominated	
