= To the Ghosts =

2024 studio album by Cults

Studio album by Cults
- Released: July 26, 2024
- Genres: Synth-pop; art pop
- Length: 44:50
- Label: Imperial
- Producers: Cults; Shane Stoneback

Cults chronology
Host (2020)	To the Ghosts (2024)

Singles from To the Ghosts
- 1. "Crybaby" Released: April 23, 2024; 2. "Left My Keys" Released: June 7, 2024; 3. "Hung the Moon" Released: July 12, 2024

To the Ghosts is the fifth studio album by American indie pop band Cults, released on July 26, 2024, through Imperial Records. It was written and recorded during the COVID-19 pandemic and is designed to look back at the band's past. Cults wrote the album at Brian Oblivion's apartment, with over 100 songs being written before narrowing the track listing and produced it along with Shane Stoneback. Primarily a synth-pop and art pop album that takes influences from pop and has been compared to shoegaze, To the Ghosts includes both pessimistic and optimistic themes.

To the Ghosts was supported by the singles "Crybaby", "Left My Keys", and "Hung the Moon". Cults also released a music video for "Onions", which won the award for Best Alternative Video – International at the 2025 UK Music Video Awards. To the Ghosts received mostly positive reviews from music critics, who considered the album to be creative and noted its similarities to the band's previous work, although some thought that it left little impression.

== Background and development ==
Upon the release of Cults' fourth studio album, Host (2020), lead singer Madeline Follin revealed that she was "too shy to bring her own songwriting and demos to the table for the band's first three albums". Cults worked with their longtime producer Shane Stoneback to design an album that looked back on their past. The album's title represents the "ghosts" of the band members' past selves. Brian Oblivion told Atwood Magazine that they wanted to have some "levity and tenderness" within To the Ghosts after their past few albums being dark, saying they had gotten into a good mental state and wanted to explore that. Follin added on that "It was kind of freeing for our writing process" as they believed that they had more time and not as much pressure. Oblivion also added on that the melodies and lyrics came out of trying to "entertain each other" and "sing something that sounds cool".

To the Ghosts was written and recorded during the COVID-19 pandemic, with writing taking place at Brian Oblivion's apartment. Before narrowing the album down to 13 tracks, Cults wrote over 100 songs for the album that totaled over six hours. Stoneback transitioned into working for film during the pandemic, so Cults believed that they would not work with him again. They tried working with other producers, but Follin said that things "just weren't working", so they tried reaching out to Stoneback, who said that he had 30 days off, so he told Cults that "if we can finish it in 30 days, we can do it". They then traveled to Los Angeles to meet up with Stoneback to make the album.

== Composition ==
To the Ghosts has "spectral" production and bears similar "captivating" factors to Cults' previous work. While it has some dark tracks, it also has light-hearted moments that were meant to serve as "nostalgic and hopeful" tracks. To the Ghosts is primarily a synth-pop and art pop album and takes influences from upbeat pop. Dan Harrison of Dork considered the album to sound like the Ronettes and shoegaze, describing it as an album that "invites you to dance with your own spectres" and called it the "sonic equivalent" of "finding a dusty photo album in your grandparents' attic, only to realise all the pictures are of you". The album also heavily relies on reverb.

Marc Maleri of Atwood Magazine considered the lyrics of To the Ghosts "compelling". While the album's lyrics include pessimistic thoughts and vulnerability, it also includes "optimistic pop themes". There are also romantic themes as described by Follin. Oblivion said that "At the [album's] heart, [t]here's beauty and fascination in depression and darkness, but at the same time, there's lightness and levity and comedy in that too... it's a retrospective of us being like, 'What the hell, how did we get here?'"

=== Songs ===
To the Ghosts open with "Crybaby", which was influenced by the Crystals, Joe Meek, and Kraftwerk. It is a psychedelic song that opens with bells and has a chorus that was compared to the Flaming Lips and Blondie's "Maria". The song's lyrics are about losing sympathy for someone who complains a lot. The second track, "Left My Keys", is a "bright, shimmery" alt-pop song with "rich, synthy textures" and has been called an "anthem for growing up". "Onions" has "witty" lyrics about how onions "make [Follin] cry" and was compared to "The Mother We Share" by Chvrches, with Follin's voice being compared to Lauren Mayberry's.

"Crystal" has a "big" melody and "lovelorn" lyrics, while taking influences from baroque pop and 1970s pop, with cheerful synths. "Leave Home" has a dense guitar riff and lyrics involving post-traumatic feelings and promises about things to come. For The Independent, PA Reporters compared the following two tracks, "Eat It Cold" and "Honey", to psychedelic rock from the 1960s and 1970s. The former song is an electropop song with some elements of gothic rock about how "traditions and secrets can devour you and with the elegant menace". It is more dissonant than Cults' other work, being described as having "descending minor scales, fluttering synths, low kick drums, and twisting vocal inflections". The latter song was compared to "Go Outside" from Cults' 2011 self-titled album due to its "playground sounds".

"Knots", in a similar vein to "Crystal", takes influences from baroque pop and 1970s pop. "Behave" was compared to Sylvan Esso, Jessy Lanza, and Yaeji, taking influence from house and club-pop, with "propulsive electronics". "Open Water" opens with a "big brass arrangement" and has a "heavy undertow". "Cells" is a short and simple song about apoptosis, whereas the album's following penultimate track, "You're in Love with Yourself", is a "lengthy outlier" about frustration about a stubborn person.

The final track, "Hung the Moon", is a power ballad that is over five minutes long. Oblivion said that it serves as a "melancholy resolution" and that it being a power ballad was the only ending that Cults believed made sense, as their previous albums had also ended with power ballads. It was described as a "twangy lullaby" and having a 1950s style that was compared to David Lynch and Angelo Badalamenti, with Igor Bannikov saying for The Line of Best Fit that it could fit for a 1950s prom or the soundtrack to Twin Peaks.

== Release and promotion ==
"Crybaby" was released as the lead single from To the Ghosts on April 23, 2024; the song's release marked Cults' first release in two years. The second single, "Left My Keys", was released on June 7, 2024, accompanied with a visualizer, and Cults subsequentially announced the album, along with its release date and track listing. The third single, "Hung the Moon", was released on July 12, 2024, following the band releasing a remix of "Fortnight" by Taylor Swift the week prior. To the Ghosts was released on July 26, 2024, through Imperial Records. The band also released a music video for "Onions", which was nominated at the 2025 UK Music Video Awards for Best Alternative Video – International and Best Production Design in a Video, and won the former award. In August 2024, Cults performed tracks from the album live in Lollapalooza.

== Critical reception ==
Professional ratings
Aggregate scores
Source	Rating
Metacritic	67/100
Review scores
Source	Rating
AllMusic	3.5/5 stars
Beats per Minute	68%
Dork	4/5
The Independent	7/10
The Line of Best Fit	7/10
MusicOMH	3/5 stars
Pitchfork	6.0/10

To the Ghosts received mostly positive reviews from music critics. It has a weighted average score of 67 out of 100 on Metacritic based on five reviews, indicating "generally favorable reviews". Harrison called To the Ghosts "cathartic" and commented that it "cements Cults' reputation for crafting emotionally resonant soundscapes". Despite believing that Cults are still difficult to pin down, Heather Phares of AllMusic said that the album "reflects how [they have] endured without compromising the innocence and artful popcraft at the heart of their sound". PA Reporters said for The Independent that To the Ghosts "stay[s] true to their synth-pop roots" and that it "certainly pushed their creative boundaries". Maleri remarked that "the record has something to give every kind of listener".

Brianna Corrine of Beats per Minute said that To the Ghosts "romanticizes life and love while also providing a reality check that is much needed and somehow manages to be jarringly comforting" and praised it for "explor[ing] their creativity". Bannikov also praised the album as Cults' "most solid and mature form to date"; however, he also noted that it is sometimes "too naive" or has "clumsy" lyrics. John Murphy of MusicOMH argued that despite To the Ghosts sounding "nice and pleasant", it "tend[s] to float by without leaving much of an impression". Similarly, Arielle Gordon of Pitchfork summarized that in the album, Cults sound "eerie and cheery" but "struggle to transcend the fleeting pleasantries of paint-by-numbers pop".

== Track listing ==
All tracks are written by Madeline Follin and Brian Oblivion.

Standard edition
No.	Title	Length
1.	"Crybaby"	2:54
2.	"Left My Keys"	3:17
3.	"Onions"	4:10
4.	"Crystal"	2:34
5.	"Leave Home"	3:00
6.	"Eat It Cold"	4:19
7.	"Honey"	4:09
8.	"Knots"	2:53
9.	"Behave"	2:43
10.	"Open Water"	3:21
11.	"Cells"	1:44
12.	"You're in Love with Yourself"	4:12
13.	"Hung the Moon"	5:28
Total length:		44:50

Deluxe edition
No.	Title	Length
14.	"Mark My Words"	3:51
15.	"Compaction"	2:54
16.	"Noises They Make"	1:37
17.	"Tiffany"	2:53
Total length:		56:05

== Credits and personnel ==
Credits adapted from Tidal.

Musicians

- Madeline Follin – vocals (all tracks), guitar (tracks 1–4, 6–13), keyboards (track 5), vibraphone (track 2)
- Brian Oblivion – keyboards (tracks 1–4, 6–13), guitar (track 5), background vocals (track 7)
- Maxwell Kamins – bass (tracks 1–8, 10–13)
- Loren Shane Humphry – drums (all tracks), background vocals (track 3), guitar (tracks 3, 13), percussion (tracks 1–8, 10–13), synthesizer (track 6)
- Ricky Lucchese – trombone (tracks 1, 3, 8, 10, 13)
- Jesse Kotanski – cello (tracks 3, 7, 12), violin (tracks 3, 7, 12)
- Darla Christie – background vocals (track 9)
- Edie Lou Follin – background vocals (track 9)
- Ford de la Rosa – background vocals (track 9)
- Halsey Valentine de la Rosa – background vocals (track 9)
- Mary Jet de la Rosa – background vocals (track 9)

Technical

- Madeline Follin – producer (all tracks), composer (all tracks)
- Brian Oblivion – producer (all tracks), composer (all tracks)
- Loren Shane Humphry – recording engineer (all tracks)
- Shane Stoneback – producer (all tracks), recording engineer (all tracks)
- Shira Small-Cangialosi – composer (track 4)
- Ian Rosales – assistant recording engineer (all tracks)
- Lucas Carpenter – assistant recording engineer (all tracks)
- Heba Kadrey – mastering engineer (all tracks)
- John Congleton – mixing engineer (all tracks)
