= Walter TV =

Canadian indie rock band

- Origin: Vancouver, British Columbia, Canada
- Genres: Indie rock; garage rock; surf rock; jangle pop; psychedelic pop; lo-fi
- Years active: 2011–present
- Labels: Sinderlyn; AmDiscs; Water Records
- Members: Pierce McGarry; Joe McMurray; Simon Ankenman
- Past members: Mac DeMarco

Walter TV is a Canadian indie rock band from Vancouver, British Columbia, formed in 2011. The group consists of Pierce McGarry (vocals, guitar), Joe McMurray (drums) and Simon Ankenman (bass). McGarry and McMurray have both played in the backing band of Mac DeMarco, who was associated with Walter TV in its early years and is credited on the band's debut album.

The band has released three studio albums: Appetite (2012), Blessed (2015) and Carpe Diem (2017), the latter two through Sinderlyn. Recorded largely at home and between touring commitments, their music has been described as lo-fi psychedelic pop and "psychedelic garage pop", and critics have often noted both its resemblance to and its divergence from DeMarco's work.

== History ==
=== Formation and Appetite ===
Walter TV began in Vancouver, where McGarry and McMurray first played together; early material was written in the basements and cottage-like houses of a beach town outside the city. According to McGarry, the group's name came from a radio show the members hosted: "we didn't want to call it radio so we called it TV ... Walter's a dog". He later rejected the suggestion that the band had taken its name from a Makeout Videotape song, saying instead that DeMarco had used the name for one of his own songs in order to attract attention on Myspace.

The band's debut album, Appetite, was issued on cassette in late 2012. Pitchfork described Walter TV as "a Montreal via Vancouver band" whose ranks included DeMarco alongside McGarry and McMurray. Reviewing the album for Now, Samantha Edwards called it "a fuzzy pop album available on cassette" and a "short collection of weird psychedelic ditties", comparing McGarry's singing to that of Avey Tare of Animal Collective; the paper awarded it a rating of NNNN.

In 2014, Sinderlyn gave Appetite a wider release on vinyl and CD; it had previously been available only on cassette, issued by AmDiscs and Green Burrito Records. Exclaim! noted that although the group was described as a trio, DeMarco was listed as a full band member in the album credits, while Pitchfork had reported the previous year that DeMarco was "not a full time member of the band" and that McGarry was "the principal member". The Big Takeover welcomed the reissue as a proper release for "their oddball first album", hearing a blend of White Fang's lo-fi irreverence and the "psychotic attack" of Paint Fumes.

Walter TV toured North America in the autumn of 2014, supported on most dates by Tonstartssbandht; by then the band was based in Los Angeles, and a scheduled Vancouver show was cancelled. That year McGarry also directed the animated video for the Appetite track "Master Ludi", which featured DeMarco. A filmmaker and designer, McGarry made several of DeMarco's VHS-style music videos, including "Passing Out Pieces", "She's Really All I Need" and, in 2017, "One Another".

=== Blessed ===
Blessed, the band's second album, was announced by Sinderlyn in April 2015 for a June release and was eventually issued on July 10, 2015. It was recorded after McMurray and McGarry moved to Montreal, where much of the album was tracked in their shared apartment, with further sessions in Los Angeles and while the pair toured with DeMarco; Ankenman joined them periodically.

The band previewed "Neighbour" in April 2015 and "Candles" in June. Reviewing the finished album, Exclaim! wrote that while Walter TV "bear some distinct similarities to their famed collaborator, their own music is an altogether stranger beast", singling out the wobbling vocal effects and describing "Walter's Kaya" and "Fan" as "frantically jittery" and "Thanksgiving (Looper)" as "a curious sound experiment"; the reviewer also observed that "Punk Song" and "Surf Metal" "sound absolutely nothing like their titular genres".

McGarry described the band's working method as a form of assembly: having built up a large catalogue of unrecorded songs, the group treated each album as "more of an editing project or a collage piece", mixing new material with songs they had played in Vancouver for years. He added that Walter TV had not gone on hiatus during DeMarco's tours and that the band operated "as a group, no boss". Blessed was recorded to tape where possible, although the members described themselves as "never ... militant" about analogue recording. Interviewed that year, McGarry said 2015 was the first time the band had been paid for festival performances, following earlier tours that had left members borrowing money to get home.

=== Carpe Diem ===
The band announced its third album, Carpe Diem, in May 2017 alongside the single "Graceland", with an initial release date of August 4; the album was ultimately released on September 8, 2017, on Sinderlyn. Its ten tracks were preceded by the singles "Graceland", "Last Day" and "Begotten", and the first 300 copies of the LP were pressed on opaque yellow vinyl.

A press release described the record as an attempt to take the band's "version of lo-fi recording to a near professional level (or at least attempted to)", and listed its subjects as "suffering, loss, death, love, chaos, inevitability ... heart attacks, forfeiture of morals, yearning ... being paranoid". Of "Begotten", the band said the song concerned "getting older and losing touch with a spiritual side of life (briefly), but working on getting that back". The album was supported by a North American tour in October 2017 that included dates in Canada and the United States, among them a show at the Mohawk in Austin.

Carpe Diem drew generally favourable coverage. Northern Transmissions gave it 8.0 out of 10, arguing that the band was "much more than a simple side-project for Mac Demarco's live band" and praising its "Lynchian" streak; The Red & Black noted that at roughly 30 minutes the album continued a pattern, since all of the band's records run 30 minutes or less — Blessed runs 23 — and praised its use of instrumentation to convey mood; and Eleven PDX characterised the album as "paranoid art presented as hallucinogenic-merengue pop".

=== Later activity ===
No further Walter TV album has been released since Carpe Diem. The members have pursued other work alongside the band: McMurray records ambient and electronic music as ~j~, Ankenman works as a canoe guide in British Columbia, and McGarry works in film and visual art. Interviewed in 2017, McGarry said that Walter TV's slower release schedule resulted from touring with DeMarco, but that he found playing smaller venues with his own band rewarding: "it's good to see people's faces".

== Musical style and influences ==
Critics have classified Walter TV as indie rock, lo-fi and psychedelic pop. Exclaim! compared the band to "Animal Collective at their most lo-fi and rock-oriented", while Now likened McGarry's vocals to Avey Tare's. Writing about Carpe Diem, Northern Transmissions heard echoes of Ty Segall and noted the album's debt to the films of David Lynch, and Eleven PDX described the record as resembling "a dub remix of a Bizarro-world DeMarco release, or a basement tape from Os Mutantes". The band has jokingly called its music "surf metal", a phrase picked up by some press biographies, and gave a Blessed track that title despite the song bearing no relation to either genre.

Members have cited a wide range of influences. Asked to name the records that shaped him, McGarry chose Aphex Twin's Selected Ambient Works 85–92, Sarah McLachlan's Surfacing and a box set of Bob Marley's early recordings; he and Ankenman also named Thin Lizzy, Neil Young and Aphex Twin in a 2015 interview. Film has been a recurrent reference point: Carpe Diem includes "Laura Palmer", a nod to Twin Peaks, and its lead single "Graceland" shares its title with the Elvis Presley estate. McGarry named Lynch first among his five favourite directors, alongside Antonia Bird, Kelly Reichardt, Paul Thomas Anderson and Richard Linklater.

The band's output has been shaped by its circumstances. Appetite was recorded in a basement that flooded regularly and had a beetle infestation, in a house the members described as haunted, on 13 acres of swampland where "the TV would turn on to static"; Blessed was assembled between a crowded Montreal apartment and life on the road. McGarry has said the group prefers tape but believes "the music should speak for itself" and should come from whatever is available.

== Band members ==
Current members

- Pierce McGarry – vocals, guitar
- Joe McMurray – drums
- Simon Ankenman – bass

Former and occasional members

- Mac DeMarco – bass, drums (early associate; credited on Appetite)
- Peter Sagar - bass guitar
- Trevor Baird - bass guitar
- Andy White - bass guitar
- Matt Sharpe - drums
- Edwin White - steel drum

== Discography ==
Studio albums
Title	Release	Label	Notes
Appetite	April 20, 2012	AmDiscs	Debut; issued on cassette, then reissued on vinyl and CD by Sinderlyn in 2014
Blessed	July 10, 2015	Sinderlyn	Recorded in Montreal, Los Angeles and on tour
Carpe Diem	September 8, 2017	Sinderlyn	Ten tracks; first 300 LPs pressed on yellow vinyl
