= Offering (Cults album) =

2017 studio album by Cults

Studio album by Cults
- Released: October 6, 2017
- Studios: Outland; Thunderdome; Stockholm Syndrome Sound; Thrill Me; The Cave; Lone Palm
- Genres: Synth-pop; electropop; indie pop; indie rock; new wave; dream pop
- Length: 41:36
- Label: Sinderlyn
- Producers: Cults; Shane Stoneback

Cults chronology
Static (2013)	Offering (2017)	Host (2020)

Offering is the third studio album by American indie pop band Cults, released on October 6, 2017, by Sinderlyn.

== Reception ==
Professional ratings
Aggregate scores
Source	Rating
Metacritic	71/100
Review scores
Source	Rating
AllMusic	4/5 stars
Drowned in Sound	8/10
Pitchfork	6.6/10
Under the Radar	7/10 stars

Offering received generally favorable reviews from critics. From Metacritic (which assigns a normalized rating out of 100 to reviews from mainstream critics) the album received an average score of 71 out of 100, based on 9 reviews, which indicates "generally favorable" reviews.

== Track listing ==
Music and lyrics by Madeline Follin and Brian Oblivion

Offering track listing
No.	Title	Length
1.	"Offering"	4:16
2.	"I Took Your Picture"	3:21
3.	"With My Eyes Closed"	3:45
4.	"Recovery"	4:15
5.	"Right Words"	3:10
6.	"Good Religion"	4:03
7.	"Natural State"	3:51
8.	"Nothing Is Written"	3:39
9.	"Talk in Circles"	3:56
10.	"Clear from Far Away"	3:48
11.	"Gilded Lily"	3:32

== Personnel ==
Credits adapted from the album's liner notes.

=== Cults ===
- Madeline Follin – vocals, drums, pianos, keyboards, production
- Brian Oblivion – keyboards, electronics, guitar, bass, percussion, drum programming, production

=== Additional contributors ===
- Shane Stoneback – production, engineering, mixing
- Max Kamins – engineering assistance (all tracks), bass (tracks 5, 10)
- Ian Sefchick – mastering
- Gabriel Rodriguez – additional guitar (4, 6, 7, 11)
- Marc Deriso – drums (2–7, 11)
- Loren Humphrey – drums (9, 10)
- Will McLaren – additional guitar (3, 10)
- Scarlett Connolly – photography
- Mortis Studio – art design, layout
- Mike Sniper – art direction

== Charts ==
Chart performance for Offering
Chart (2022)	Peak position
Lithuanian Albums (AGATA)	61
