= David Lowe (actor) =

English scientist and actor

- Born: 17 April 1955 (age 71); Warrington, Cheshire, England
- Occupations: Actor; Composer; Film director
- Years active: 1987–present

David Lowe (born 17 April 1955) is an English actor, composer, film director and scientist. He appeared in more than thirty films since 1987.

== Selected filmography ==
Year	Title	Role	Notes
1998	The Man in the Iron Mask	An Advisor to the King	
2009	Eden Is West	Fred	
2011	Midnight in Paris	TS Eliot	
2011–2012	The Borgias	French Ambassador	TV
2018	Intrigo: Death of an Author	Edgar L.	
2025	Crystal Cross	TBA	
