= Static (Cults album) =

Studio album by Cults
- Released: October 15, 2013
- Recorded: 2012–2013, SMT Studios, Treefort Studios, Maze Studios (Atlanta)
- Genres: Indie rock, pop
- Length: 34:56
- Label: Columbia Records
- Producers: Cults, Shane Stoneback, Ben H. Allen III

Cults chronology
Cults (2011)	Static (2013)	Offering (2017)

Singles from Static
- 1. "I Can Hardly Make You Mine" Released: August 13, 2013; 2. "High Road" Released: September 3, 2013

Static is the second studio album by American indie pop band Cults, released by Columbia Records on October 15, 2013.

== Album title and themes ==
Of the album's title, band member Brian Oblivion said, "There's a feeling our generation has. The feeling there's always something better around the corner, that everyone is born to be a star. The feeling that life is waiting for you, and yet it’s not happening. All of that is static." Oblivion has also said, "I've fallen in love with the idea of static over the last year...When we were making this record, we put a couple of broken TVs on the mixing board and we'd turn the lights off, stare at them, and listen to the songs to see if the glow felt right."

Much of the discussion of the album was centered on the personal break-up of band members Madeline and Brian. Robert Ham of Paste wrote, "Fortunately or unfortunately for Cults, the release of [Static] is going to be clouded with the news that the couple behind the music—singer/lyricist Madeline Follin and guitarist Brian Oblivion—split up last year." He also wrote, "What will hopefully rise to the surface for those folks picking through these songs is how strong the music is here." Heather Fares of AllMusic wrote, "...breakups often provide plenty of songwriting fodder. Writing and performing songs with an ex, as Cults did on their second album, Static, is probably a special circle of hell, but when the results are this good, it's worth it." She continued to say, "The album's imagery hints at Madeline Follin and Brian Oblivion's breakup...and yet their music is stronger than ever, balancing the elements they set forth on their debut with fewer gimmicks and more complexity."

== Critical reception ==
Professional ratings
Aggregate scores
Source	Rating
AnyDecentMusic?	6.9/10
Metacritic	73/100
Review scores
Source	Rating
Allmusic	4/5 stars
Under the Radar	7.5/10 stars
Consequence of Sound	3.5/5 stars
Spin	7/10
Pitchfork	6.8/10
Sputnikmusic	3/5
Paste	7.8/10
Slant Magazine	3.5/5 stars
This Is Fake DIY	3/5 stars
Boston Globe	80/100

Static received generally favorable reviews from music critics. At Metacritic, which assigns a normalized rating out of 100 to reviews from mainstream critics, the album has received an average score of 73 out of 100, which indicates "generally favorable reviews," based on 26 reviews. On AnyDecentMusic?, the album received an average score of 6.9 out of 10.

== Track listing ==
Music and lyrics by Madeline Follin and Brian Oblivion

1. "I Know" – 1:42
2. "I Can Hardly Make You Mine" – 3:30
3. "Always Forever" – 3:43
4. "High Road" – 4:28
5. "Were Before" – 3:01
6. "So Far" – 3:29
7. "Keep Your Head Up" – 3:38
8. "TV Dream" – 1:02
9. "We've Got It" – 3:25
10. "Shine a Light" – 3:14
11. "No Hope" – 3:44

== Personnel ==
Cults

- Madeline Follin – vocals, production
- Brian Oblivion – vocals, guitar, bass, keyboards, production

Additional musicians

- Hamilton Berry – cello, orchestration
- Loren Shane Humphrey – drums
- Marc Deriso – drums
- Cory Stier – drums
- Jason Kingsland – bass, vocal engineering
- Will McLaren – guitar
- Arthur Moeller – violin
- Gabriel Rodriguez – guitar, percussion, backing vocals

Technical personnel

- Shane Stoneback – production
- Ben H. Allen III – additional production, mixing
- Steve Fallone – mastering
- Brian Herman – assistant engineer
- Summer jones – assistant engineer
- Paul Kostabi – pre-production

Art direction

- Dave Bett – art direction, design
- Jeff Striker – art direction, design
- Dustyn L. Peterman – drawing
- Ben Pier – photography
