= Anna Biller =

Film director

- Biller during the 70th BFI London Film Festival
- Born: Los Angeles, California, U.S.
- Occupations: Film director; producer; screenwriter; actress; editor; production designer; musician; costume designer
- Known for: Feminist films
- Notable work: Viva; The Love Witch; The Face of Horror
- Partner: Robert Greene

Anna Biller is an American filmmaker who wrote and directed the feature films Viva (2007), The Love Witch (2016), and The Face of Horror (2026). Biller considers herself a feminist filmmaker and consciously explores feminist themes throughout her work, including exploring the female gaze in cinema. She is vocal on both her website and in interviews about gender inequalities in the film industry.

== Early life ==
Biller was born in Los Angeles to a Japanese-American mother who is a fashion designer and a Caucasian father who is a visual artist. She grew up watching her mother design clothes, watching her father paint with a bright color palette, and watching classic cinema, all of which has influenced her filmmaking practice. She has a B.A. in art from UCLA and an MFA in art and film from the California Institute of the Arts. During her time at CalArts, she studied both art and film and began making 16 mm films, and was mentored by Morgan Fisher and Paul McCarthy. She started making 8 mm films while she was living in New York.

== Career ==
=== 1994–2007: Short films and Viva ===
At the beginning of her career, Biller was known for her short films and staged musicals, which played with old Hollywood genres and tropes from the 1930s to the 1950s. She made her first short film, Three Examples of Myself as Queen, while studying at CalArts. In the film, Biller plays Pointsettia, a teenager who turns into a princess and has the power to transform men into dogs. The film screened at small venues and film festivals. Lane Relyea of Artforum International wrote "the film's humor and graceful perplexity may not have caused any sudden shifts in the local fault lines but did crack a glorious smile on this audience member's face." John Hartl of The Seattle Times called it a "bizarre, Warholian musical fantasy."

In 2001, she directed two short films: The Hypnotist, a melodrama written by her frequent collaborator Jared Sanford, and A Visit from the Incubus, a Western horror musical. A Visit from the Incubus tells the story of a woman who is raped by an incubus, and decides to get back at him by challenging him to a singing competition. Robert Nott of The Santa Fe New Mexican called it a "must-see". Biller sourced most of the set pieces in A Visit from the Incubus from the scene dock at Culver Studios, and the furniture from the Warner Bros. and Universal studios property departments. Biller made and sourced all of the costumes for the short film herself, finding men’s wear from thrift stores and hand sewing ruffles on every petticoat for the Victorian-style costumes worn by the women.

Her 2007 debut feature film, Viva, tells the story of a bored housewife who goes out in search of sexual adventure in the 1970s. Viva offers a satirical perspective on the adult film industry, exploring women's agency and empowerment within this context. Biller's approach combines elements of satire, horror, and genre filmmaking, blending camp with feminist critique to create visually captivating and thematically rich narratives. It premiered at the International Film Festival Rotterdam, and won the Best of Fest Award at the Boston Underground Film Festival. The film was also entered into the main competition at the 29th Moscow International Film Festival. Reason magazine called Viva an "uncannily precise rendition of the look, sound, mood, and arch dialogue" of seventies sexploitation films, with "high-key, pseudo-Technicolor lighting and spare, colorful set design." Viva had a very limited theatrical release.

=== 2008–2016: The Love Witch ===
Biller's second feature film, The Love Witch, premiered in 2016 at the International Film Festival Rotterdam. The film is a twist on classic serial killer films, featuring a woman who kills through calculated sexuality and "love magic," causing her male victims to fall too much in love. In The Love Witch, Samantha Robinson portrays the protagonist, Elaine, whose quest for love serves as a critique of patriarchal ideals and the objectification of women. Biller describes the film as addressing "how being a woman in our society can drive you crazy." It evokes the sexploitation of women in Hammer horror films, and was shot entirely on film in order to recreate the old Hollywood style. The film took Biller seven years to complete, five of which were pre-production and two were post-production, because of her attention to detail in directing, writing, costume and set design, and work with her cinematographer. Biller completed all of the sets and costumes herself, as there was no budget left to hire pre-production designers. In an interview with Colin McCormack for Sag Indie, Biller shared that all of the costumes were sewn and designed in her house, “... I have a little sewing room in my house. And it’s actually not even large enough to accommodate an assistant. We thought we could get the budget together for me to get me an assistant to help with hems and ironing and stuff, but I didn’t have space.” The film was shot in Northern California, and Elaine’s Victorian style house was located in Arcata. In order to achieve the vintage glamorous Hollywood aesthetic, Biller paid immense attention to the lighting. In the same interview with McCormack, Biller commented, “Yeah, the lighting is the most important thing. We also used vintage lenses and that helps too. But it’s every little thing – it’s the lighting, the lensing, and even the size of lenses you choose. They didn’t use a lot of wide-angle lenses in those days.”

Richard Brody of The New Yorker said of The Love Witch, "Biller puts genre to the test of do-it-yourself artistry, and puts feminist ideology itself to the test of style. The film pulsates with furious creative energy throughout, sparking excitement and giddy amazement that it even exists." In May 2016, The Love Witch was acquired for distribution by Oscilloscope Laboratories. The Love Witch was included in many lists for the best films of 2016, including those of The New Yorker and IndieWire. It won in a tie for the Trailblazer Award and Best Costume Design at the Chicago Indie Critics Awards, and also won the Michael Cimino Best Film Award at the American Independent Film Awards.

=== 2017–present: Bluebeard's Castle and The Face of Horror ===
Biller said in 2017 that her next film will be a Bluebeard story. She stated that "I want to make this film because I have a yearning to see more quality films for women, like the ones that were made in Hollywood’s golden age." However, Biller ended up transforming the project into her first novel, Bluebeard's Castle. The novel tells the story of a writer named Judith, and her romance with her husband Gavin, a wealthy baron. The story quickly turns to horror as Judith tries to determine if her husband is truly loving, or actually a classic Gothic villain. The book was published in October 2023 by Verso Books. Bluebeard's Castle was listed as one of the best fiction books of 2023 by The Telegraph, who said it was, "A stylised retelling of the old fable that mixes self-reference and gaudy excess ... the sex, death and pricy cognac are of a wildly enjoyable piece." The Times Literary Supplement also praised it, calling it "Both a fantasy and a nightmare, with the film-maker Biller employing the same sense of celluloid artifice and lusciously heightened reality that characterized her retro horror masterpiece The Love Witch." In an interview with Becca Child of Metal Magazine, Biller describes the novel as a hybrid between a literary and genre novel, starting as a Gothic romance and becoming a Gothic horror tale. She states, “I wanted to start with a romance in order to draw the reader into it the way Judith is drawn in, and then make a shocking shift, the way she would feel it when her world starts to fall apart.” When asked how the Gothic depicts the timeless struggles of women, Biller explained that the Gothic genre is a space for women to express their fears surrounding men. Biller notes that most romance novels are modelled off of Cinderella, where a rich man and his castle are the ultimate fantasy, yet in BlueBeard, “... the castle represents patriarchy, and the man represents rape, disenfranchisement, servitude, pain, and death; so, Bluebeard is a horror tale.”

In 2019, Biller became a member of the Academy of Motion Picture Arts and Sciences.

In July 2022, Biller announced her next film, a ghost story called The Face of Horror. On June 26, 2025, it was announced that Jonah Hauer-King, Kristine Froseth, Bella Heathcote, Ellie Bamber, and Leo Suter had joined the cast, which was to begin filming in July in Prague. A week later, on July 2, 2025, Ben Radcliffe was announced to be joining the cast. The Face of Horror, set in 14th Century England, is loosely based on the Yotsuya Kaidan, a Japanese ghost story. Hauer-Kind is cast to play a knight, Edward Carnifex, married to Eleanor (played by Froseth), but leaves her for a wealthy noblewoman (Heathcote), forcing Eleanor to take bloody revenge. Eleanor’s sister Beatrice is played by Ellie Bamber, and Leo Suter plays both Edward’s squire and Richard, Beatrice’s suitor. The film premiered at the Toronto International Film Festival in September 2026.

== Personal life ==
Biller lives in Los Angeles with her partner, author Robert Greene. Biller has two cats: Jacques, a tuxedo; and Pushkin, a Maine Coon tabby.

== Filmography ==
Biller served as director, producer, writer, editor, and costume designer on all films listed.

Year	Film	Type	Credit
1994	Three Examples of Myself as Queen	Short film	Also actress, composer, production designer
1998	Fairy Ballet	Short film	Also actress, composer, production designer
2001	The Hypnotist	Short film	Also production designer
2001	A Visit from the Incubus	Short film	Also actress, composer, production designer
2007	Viva	Feature film	Also actress, songwriter, production designer
2016	The Love Witch	Feature film	Also songwriter, production designer
2026	The Face of Horror	Feature film	Also songwriter

== Awards ==
Awards that Biller has won throughout the years.

Year	Film	Type	Award Type	Result
2007	Viva	Feature film	Best of Fest Award	Won
2007	Viva	Feature film	Golden St. George Award	Nominated
2008	Viva	Feature film	Transilvania Trophy	Nominated
2016	The Love Witch	Feature film	Best Motion Picture	Won
2016	The Love Witch	Feature film	Best International Feature Film	Nominated
2017	The Love Witch	Feature film	Trailblazer Award	Won
2017	The Love Witch	Feature film	Best Costume Design	Won
