= Blessed (Walter TV album) =

2015 studio album by Walter TV

Studio album by Walter TV
- Released: July 10, 2015
- Recorded: 2014–2015
- Studios: Home studios in Montreal and Los Angeles
- Genres: Indie rock; psychedelic pop; lo-fi; surf rock
- Length: 23:50
- Label: Sinderlyn

Walter TV chronology
Appetite (2012)	Blessed (2015)	Carpe Diem (2017)

Blessed is the second studio album by Canadian indie rock band Walter TV, released on July 10, 2015, by Sinderlyn. It followed the band's 2012 debut Appetite and was their first album for Sinderlyn, which had reissued that debut the previous year. Much of Blessed was recorded at home in Montreal and in Los Angeles, with sessions continuing while members toured as part of Mac DeMarco's backing band.

The album was announced in March 2015 and previewed with the singles "Surf Metal", "Neighbour" and "Candles". Blessed received generally favourable reviews, with critics describing it as a brighter and more varied record than the band's debut while continuing to note the group's debt to — and distance from — DeMarco.

== Background and recording ==
Walter TV — Pierce McGarry, Joe McMurray and Simon Ankenman — released their debut album Appetite in 2012 and spent the following years touring worldwide as members of DeMarco's band, with McGarry and McMurray playing bass and drums respectively. McGarry said the group had accumulated a large catalogue of unrecorded songs while touring, so that making an album became "more of an editing project or a collage piece": Blessed mixed newly written material with songs audiences had heard the band play for years in Vancouver.

Recording took place after McMurray and McGarry moved to Montreal, where they shared an apartment with "a constant revolving cast of characters"; much of the album was tracked there, in a space the band described as overcrowded and reeking of cigarettes. Further sessions were held in Los Angeles and while the pair were on the road with DeMarco, with Ankenman joining them periodically to finish recordings. DIY described the album as having started in Montreal and been "finished up on the road". The band preferred recording to tape but described itself as "never ... militant" about it, believing the music "should come from wherever and whatever is available".

The credits list additional players alongside the core trio, including Trevor Baird, Mathew Sharpe and DeMarco. By the time of its release the group was being described in the music press as a trio, with DeMarco characterised as a past or part-time collaborator rather than a full member.

== Composition ==
Blessed runs 23 minutes and 50 seconds across ten tracks, making it the shortest of the band's albums. Reviewers heard a record that was sunnier and more varied than Appetite. Exclaim! noted that the opening "Candles" trades in the watery jangle associated with DeMarco, before concluding that the band's own music is "an altogether stranger beast": the vocals are drenched in wobbling effects, "Walter's Kaya" and "Fan" are jittery and frantic, "Thanksgiving (Looper)" is a sound experiment rather than a song, and the joking "Punk Song" and "Surf Metal" bear little resemblance to the genres named in their titles.

Northern Transmissions compared McGarry's singing to Spencer Krug's yodelling and Avey Tare's wide range, and described melodies bending over a summery electric bass. It heard what it called the album's "now-traditional nods to the classics" — pot-laced Americana, surfy spring reverb, and a tongue-in-cheek 12-bar blues on "Punk Song" — named "Fan (With Keyboards)" the record's surprise hit, and thought "Tall Mountains" a strong closer, while finding "Thanksgiving (Looper)" and "C'mon Now" slighter.

For Vancouver Is Awesome, the musician Louise Burns compared the guitar figure in "Candles" to Love's "Your Mind and We Belong Together", singled out "Paranormal Witness" and "Tall Mountains" as thoughtful pop songs with a quivering edge, and described "Surf Metal" as erupting into glistening, mercurial surf guitar. DrunkenWerewolf heard the album moving past the band's earlier introspection towards something more carefree, pointing to the twinkling guitar of "Paranormal Witness" as evidence of its sunlit mood.

== Release and promotion ==
News of the album first surfaced in March 2015, when Sinderlyn announced a June release and shared "Surf Metal" as a first taste, described by Exclaim! as featuring "sunny guitar work and some muffled screaming in the chorus". "Neighbour" followed in April, premiered for Exclaim!, which called its narrator's invitation to "sneak a peek of you through your window" a turn towards Psycho. "Candles" arrived in June, ahead of the album. Exclaim! streamed Blessed in full on July 5, 2015, the week of its release, and the band played a short run of North American shows around it, beginning at the Cobalt in Vancouver on July 1. The album was issued on CD, cassette and vinyl, including a limited sky-blue marbled LP pressing.

A video for "Surf Metal" appeared in August 2015, and the band toured through the rest of the year in between commitments with DeMarco.

== Critical reception ==
Professional ratings
Review scores
Source	Rating
Northern Transmissions	7.5/10
Vancouver Is Awesome	3.5/5 stars

Blessed received generally positive reviews. Northern Transmissions gave it 7.5 out of 10, writing that "there's an ocean of interesting songwriting throughout" and that, although the band could break away from DeMarco's shadow, "only a few times on Blessed do they choose to exercise that ability". Louise Burns awarded it three and a half stars out of five, concluding that "while there are times where they could cool down on the trendy chorus-verb affect, Blessed is mostly bliss, drenching its listener in a wave of jittery psych-surf-pop".

DrunkenWerewolf's review was similarly warm, calling the record "the least pretentious thing to listen to this summer" and finding that "it can be sweet and abrasive all at once", while noting "a laziness to the percussion's tempo". AllMusic catalogued the album as "a pastiche of tone-bright art-pop and lo-fi garage slack", "slightly more produced, yet no less ragged" than Appetite.

== Track listing ==
Track listing and running times adapted from the album's Bandcamp page.

Blessed track listing
No.	Title	Length
1.	"Candles"	3:12
2.	"Neighbour"	2:01
3.	"Paranormal Witness"	2:16
4.	"Walter's Kaya"	3:02
5.	"Punk Song"	2:02
6.	"Surf Metal"	2:42
7.	"Fan"	2:32
8.	"Thanksgiving (Looper)"	1:19
9.	"C'mon Now"	1:43
10.	"Tall Mountains"	3:01
Total length:		23:50

== Personnel ==
Credits adapted from AllMusic.

Walter TV

- Pierce McGarry – vocals, guitar, recording
- Joe McMurray – drums
- Simon Ankenman – bass

Additional personnel

- Trevor Baird
- Mathew Sharpe
- Mac DeMarco
