= Helium (Homeshake album) =

Studio album by Homeshake
- Released: February 15, 2019
- Genres: Ambient, psychedelic pop
- Length: 33:11
- Label: Sinderlyn

Homeshake chronology
Fresh Air (2017)	Helium (2019)

Singles from Helium
- 1. "Like Mariah" Released: November 7, 2018; 2. "Nothing Could Be Better" Released: December 5, 2018; 3. "Just Like My" Released: January 9, 2019; 4. "Another Thing" Released: February 4, 2019

Professional ratings
Aggregate scores
Source	Rating
Metacritic	57/100
Review scores
Source	Rating
AllMusic	3.5/5 stars
Exclaim!	7/10
Pitchfork	3.5/10
PopMatters	6/10
Under the Radar	5.5/10

Helium is the fourth studio album by Canadian musician Peter Sagar, under his solo project Homeshake. It was released on February 15, 2019 through Sinderlyn.

== Background ==
In an interview with Flaunt Magazine, Peter explained his songwriting on this record process:

I just make songs and then try to string them together as well as I can. People I think often expect there to be premeditated thoughts in the way that I make music, but it’s really just that I make a lot of songs and then the ones that stick, that stay in my head, I finish, and then I do my best to glue them together in the album.

== Reception ==
Helium received mixed to positive reviews from critics. On Metacritic, which assigns a weighted mean from 100, the album received a 57/100, indicating "mixed or average reviews".

== Track listing ==
No.	Title	Length
1.	"Early"	1:30
2.	"Anything at All"	3:01
3.	"Like Mariah"	3:25
4.	"Heartburn"	0:35
5.	"All Night Long"	3:37
6.	"Trudi and Lou"	1:03
7.	"Just Like My"	3:28
8.	"Nothing Could Be Better"	2:51
9.	"Other Than"	3:33
10.	"Salu Says Hi"	1:27
11.	"Another Thing"	2:50
12.	"Couch Cushion"	2:14
13.	"{Secret Track)"	3:37
Total length:		33:11

== Charts ==
Chart (2019)	Peak position
US Heatseekers Albums (Billboard)	5
US Independent Albums (Billboard)	16
