= Cults (album) =

Studio album by Cults
- Released: June 7, 2011
- Recorded: 2010–2011, Treefort Studios, Brooklyn, New York
- Genre: Indie pop, noise pop
- Length: 33:41
- Label: In the Name Of, Columbia
- Producer: Cults, Shane Stoneback

Cults chronology
Cults (2011)	Static (2013)

Singles from Cults
- 1. "Go Outside" Released: April 20, 2010; 2. "Oh My God" Released: July 6, 2010; 3. "Abducted" Released: April 16, 2011; 4. "Most Wanted" Released: August 16, 2011; 5. "You Know What I Mean" Released: December 1, 2011

Cults is the debut album by American indie pop band Cults. The album was released in the US on June 7, 2011, on In the Name Of, an imprint of Columbia Records. The album was recorded over the course of 2010 and early 2011. In early 2010, the band released an EP, which featured two of the songs to appear on the album; "Go Outside" and "Most Wanted". The song "Go Outside" was featured on the soundtrack of the game MLB 11: The Show on PlayStation 3. The song "Bad Things" also appears in the Hulu true crime drama series The Act during the end credits of the third episode "Two Wolverines" and the first episode of I Am Not Okay With This. It was sampled on the track "She Knows" by rapper J. Cole from the album Born Sinner. The song "You Know What I Mean" appears in episode 6 of Amy Poehler's show Russian Doll on Netflix.

The video for "Go Outside" is made up of footage of Peoples Temple members at Jonestown, and the song includes samples of leader Jim Jones speaking in the infamous death tape.

== Critical reception ==
Professional ratings
Aggregate scores
Source	Rating
Metacritic	73/100
Review scores
Source	Rating
AllMusic	3.5/5 stars
The Guardian	4/5 stars
NME	(7/10)
Pitchfork	(8.5/10)

The critical reception to Cults was generally positive. Jazz Monroe of NME said "the album isn’t quite the tremulous voyage of hearts and minds it wants to be", but Hari Ashurst of the BBC said that "despite the genre signifiers there’s more than enough personality of their own here for Cults to transcend both their blog hit wonder and the timeworn sound they lovingly homage".

Pitchfork placed the album at number 46 on its list of the "Top 50 albums of 2011".

== Track listing ==
All tracks are written by Madeline Follin and Brian Oblivion.

No.	Title	Length
1.	"Abducted"	2:53
2.	"Go Outside"	3:24
3.	"You Know What I Mean"	2:32
4.	"Most Wanted"	3:05
5.	"Walk at Night"	3:05
6.	"Never Heal Myself"	3:03
7.	"Oh My God"	3:21
8.	"Never Saw the Point"	3:04
9.	"Bad Things"	3:40
10.	"Bumper"	2:42
11.	"Rave On"	2:52
Total length:		33:41

10th anniversary edition bonus tracks
No.	Title	Length
12.	"Beach Ball"	2:26
13.	"Make Time"	3:01
14.	"Valentine"	3:22
Total length:		42:30

== Personnel ==
Cults

- Madeline Follin – vocals, production
- Brian Oblivion – guitar, keyboards, percussion, production (all tracks), background vocals (3)

Additional personnel

- Shane Stoneback – production, mixing, engineering
- Emily Lazar – mastering
- Joe LaPorta – mastering
- Ever Ronquillo – engineering assistance
- Will McLaren – bass (3), guitar (6, 8)
- Loren Humphrey – drums (3, 8)
- David Bett – art direction, design
- Jeannette Kaczorowski – art direction, design
- Eric Chakeen – cover photo
- Ben Pier – photography
- Bettman – photography
- Corbis – photography
- Steve Simon – photography

== Charts ==
Chart performance
Chart (2011)	Peak position
Canadian Albums (Nielsen SoundScan)	89
UK Albums (OCC)	133
US Billboard 200	52
US Top Alternative Albums (Billboard)	12
US Top Rock Albums (Billboard)	14
US Top Tastemaker Albums (Billboard)	14
