= Viva (2007 film) =

2007 film by Anna Biller

- Film poster
- Directed by: Anna Biller
- Written by: Anna Biller
- Produced by: Anna Biller; Jared Sanford
- Starring: Anna Biller; Jared Sanford; Bridget Brno; Chad England; Marcus DeAnda; John Klemantaski
- Cinematography: C. Thomas Lewis
- Edited by: Anna Biller
- Production company: Anna Biller Productions
- Distributed by: Cult Epics
- Release dates: January 30, 2007 (IFFR); May 2, 2008 (United States)
- Running time: 120 minutes
- Country: United States
- Language: English
- Budget: $750,000

Viva is a 2007 American sex comedy film written and directed by Anna Biller and starring, in addition to Biller, Jared Sanford, Bridget Brno, Chad England, Marcus DeAnda, and John Klemantaski. The plot concerns a 1970s suburban housewife who is dragged through the worst excesses of the sexual revolution.

== Plot ==
In 1972, Barbi is happily married to Rick in suburban Los Angeles. She is friends with Sheila and her husband Mark, an actor, who frequently flirts with Barbi. After she is sexually harassed by her boss, Barbi quits her job. Rick is unperturbed and convinces Barbi to become a homemaker. However, Barbi and Rick begin to fight as he frequently travels for business. After Rick decides to spend a month away from her on a business trip, Barbi decides their marriage is over. Sheila informs her that Mark has also left her, and the two decide to live the single life.

While wearing risqué outfits, Barbi and Sheila are picked up by a madam who offers to arrange sexual encounters and dates for them. Barbi decides to go by the alias Viva, after the name of an erotic magazine she enjoys reading.

As Viva, Barbi goes on several arranged dates and has sexual encounters with various men. She meets photographer Clyde, but refuses to sleep with him until she is ready. However, after performing at an orgy, Clyde drugs and rapes Viva. Perturbed by the assault, Viva consults Sheila who reveals she is returning to Mark after realizing she is pregnant and encourages Viva to also reunite with Rick.

Right before her reunion with Rick, Mark attacks and attempts to rape Barbi. She fends him off, but when Rick arrives, he smells Mark's cologne and runs off. He ends up with a broken leg and reunites with Barbi. Sheila and Mark have a baby, and the two couples remain friends.

Barbi receives a phone call from Arthur, a musical producer friend of Clyde's, who offers her a role in his upcoming musical. At an audition, Barbi and Sheila perform a song about the different facets of womanhood.

== Cast ==
- Anna Biller as Barbi/Viva
- Jared Sanford as Mark Campbell
- Bridget Brno as Sheila Campbell
- Chad England as Rick
- Marcus DeAnda as Clyde
- John Klemantaski as Arthur
- Paolo Davanzo as Elmer
- Barry Morse as Sherman
- Cole Chipman as Reeves
- Robbin Ryan as Agnes

== Production ==
Biller's concept for Viva originally started as a photo series inspired by old Playboy magazines, and the photos inspired her to create a story surrounding these characters. Another major inspiration was Luis Buñuel's film Belle de Jour (1967). Biller used the photos as a proof-of-concept, and was able to secure the full funding to make a feature film from a private investor. The film was made slowly as they had to repeatedly pause production to raise more money. They originally budgeted for $100,000, but the final cost of the film was $750,000. Principal photography lasted from 2005 to 2007. Biller chose to star in the film herself because she "wouldn't ask another actress to take off her clothes in the movie and do all these things with the power trip being 'I'm the director, you're the actress.'"

== Release ==
Viva premiered at the 36th International Film Festival Rotterdam in 2007. It was also entered into the main competition at the 29th Moscow International Film Festival. The film had a limited theatrical release by Vagrant Films Releasing; it played at Cinema Village in New York as well as in New Orleans, Cleveland, and Los Angeles. Viva was released on DVD by Cult Epics and Anchor Bay Entertainment on Feb. 24, 2009.

== Reception ==
Viva received mixed to positive reactions, and "illustrates cinema's unique ability to blend high and low culture." On Rotten Tomatoes, the film holds an approval rating of 60% based on 48 reviews, with an average rating of 5.40/10. The site's critics consensus reads, "Though it's lengthy and doesn't always walk the line between schlock and kitschy homage successfully, Viva's lovely visuals and knowing humor are undeniable." On Metacritic, the film has a weighted average score of 58 out of 100, based on 14 critics, indicating "mixed or average reviews". Daniel Steinhart of Film Journal International wrote, "Full of campy performances and giggle-inducing period costumes, the film may be destined for cult status." Lauren Horwitch of Back Stage West wrote, "Biller once again proves herself to be a master multi-tasker with her new musical, Viva, which she wrote, directed, edited, designed the costumes, and stars in." It has been compared to the works of Russ Meyer and other sexploitation films of that era. Writing for the San Francisco Bay Guardian, Dennis Harvey listed Biller's performance in Viva as one of the year's "best performances most likely to be overlooked".
