= The Man in the Iron Mask (1998 film) =

American action drama film

- Theatrical release poster
- Directed by: Randall Wallace
- Screenplay by: Randall Wallace
- Based on: The Vicomte of Bragelonne: Ten Years Later; 1848 novel by Alexandre Dumas
- Produced by: Randall Wallace; Russell Smith
- Starring: Leonardo DiCaprio; Jeremy Irons; John Malkovich; Gérard Depardieu; Gabriel Byrne
- Cinematography: Peter Suschitzky
- Edited by: William Hoy
- Music by: Nick Glennie-Smith
- Production company: United Artists
- Distributed by: MGM Distribution Co. (United States and Canada); United International Pictures (International)
- Release date: March 13, 1998
- Running time: 132 minutes
- Country: United States
- Language: English
- Budget: $35 million
- Box office: $182.9 million

The Man in the Iron Mask is a 1998 American action drama film written, directed and produced by Randall Wallace in his directorial debut. It stars Leonardo DiCaprio in a dual role as the title character and the villain, Jeremy Irons as Aramis, John Malkovich as Athos, Gérard Depardieu as Porthos, and Gabriel Byrne as D'Artagnan. Some characters are derived of the French author Alexandre Dumas's novel series; The d'Artagnan Romances, and some plot elements are loosely adapted from his 1847–1850 novel The Viscount of Bragelonne/Between Two Kings (The Vicomte de Bragelonne).

The film centers on the four aging musketeers, Athos, Porthos, Aramis and D'Artagnan, during the reign of King Louis XIV. It explores the mystery of the Man in the Iron Mask, with a plot closer to the flamboyant 1929 version starring Douglas Fairbanks, The Iron Mask, and the 1939 version, directed by James Whale, than to the original Dumas book. The film received mixed reviews but was a financial success, grossing $183 million worldwide against a budget of $35 million.

== Plot ==
In 1662, the Kingdom of France moves toward revolution, facing bankruptcy from King Louis XIV's wars against the Dutch. The young and callous King Louis redistributes spoiling food supplies from the army to his starving citizens, and instructs former Musketeer Aramis to find and kill the unknown leader of the renegade Jesuits seeking to assassinate the king.

At a palace festival in Versailles, Louis attempts to seduce Christine Bellefort, the fiancée of Raoul, son of former Musketeer Athos, while D'Artagnan, captain of the king's guard, foils a Jesuit assassination plot. Sending Raoul to his death on the battlefront, Louis takes Christine as his mistress, and Athos, angered by the loss of his son, lashes out at the musketeer barracks, wounding some of the soldiers, and renounces his allegiance to the king. When D'Artagnan defuses a riot over the rotten food supplies and alerts Louis of the food that was distributed, Louis orders his chief advisor, Pierre, to be executed and future rioters to be shot. Aramis summons Athos, D'Artagnan and former Musketeer Porthos for a secret meeting, revealing himself as the Jesuits' leader with a plan to depose Louis, but D'Artagnan refuses to join them.

Athos, Porthos and Aramis infiltrate the Île Sainte-Marguerite prison and free a prisoner wearing an iron mask, whom Aramis reveals to be Philippe, Louis's identical twin brother. To avoid dynastic warfare when Queen Anne gave birth to twins, King Louis XIII sent Philippe to be raised in the country without knowledge of his true identity, telling the queen that the child had died. On his deathbed, the king informed his wife and son of Philippe's existence; fearful of losing his throne, Louis XIV forced Aramis to seal Philippe in the iron mask and imprison him for life. Wishing to redeem himself and save France, Aramis informs Anne of his plan to replace the cruel Louis with the benevolent Philippe.

The trio tutor Philippe in courtly life at an estate run by the Jesuits as they learn of a masquerade ball Louis intends to hold in 3 weeks time. There, Porthos becomes suicidal and attempts to hang himself, which fails, courtesy of Aramis. Upon learning that Louis is hosting the ball earlier than expected and the musketeers are ordered to shoot rioters on sight, Athos, Porthos, and Aramis sneak into the palace and subdue Louis during the ball, as Philippe assumes his brother's identity and returns to the festivities. Philippe meets his mother for the first time. After Queen Anne retired for the night, Christine publicly confronts the king for his role in Raoul's death, after using Louis' seal to send a letter to the Commander, learning the real truth after he wrote back, and D'Artagnan realizes the ruse when Philippe treats her with kindness, in stark contrast to the heartless Louis. D'Artagnan and his men intercept Athos, Porthos and Aramis in the dungeons, rescuing Louis as the trio escape, but Philippe is captured. After learning of Philippe's identity, D'Artagnan begs Louis to spare his brother, and Louis returns Philippe to prison in the iron mask, while Christine hangs herself.

D'Artagnan summons Athos, Porthos and Aramis to help rescue Philippe from the Bastille. Louis, suspicious of D'Artagnan's allegiance, has them cornered in the Bastille, and offers D'Artagnan clemency and a quick death for the others in exchange for his surrender. D'Artagnan refuses, revealing to his comrades that he is Louis and Philippe's biological father, having long been in love with Anne. The four former Musketeers and Philippe charge as the king's guards open fire, but their bravery compels the soldiers to deliberately miss. After surviving the charge, the musketeers salute them. Louis, however, attempted to stab Philippe. Shielding Philippe from Louis, D'Artagnan is fatally stabbed, while his protégé Lieutenant André turns against Louis, as Philippe again takes his brother's place as king.

Philippe ascends to the throne under Louis's identity, naming Athos, Porthos and Aramis as his closest advisors and holding a funeral for D'Artagnan. It was rumored that he had issued his brother a royal pardon, allowing Louis to live out the remainder of his life in peace, with his mother often visiting him. Philippe ultimately becomes one of France's greatest kings.

== Cast ==
- Leonardo DiCaprio as
  - King Louis XIV, the tyrannical King of France who bankrupts his nation into oblivion to satisfy his lavish lifestyle
  - Philippe Bourbon, The Man in the Iron Mask and Louis's twin brother, who shows more compassion and benevolence
- Jeremy Irons as Aramis, a veteran musketeer and clergyman, secretly leading the Jesuits, and also serves as the film's narrator
- John Malkovich as Athos, a retired musketeer and former nobleman
- Gérard Depardieu as Porthos, an aging ex-musketeer and former brigand who is now suicidal
- Gabriel Byrne as D'Artagnan, a veteran musketeer, now Louis's personal bodyguard and Captain
- Anne Parillaud as Queen Anne of Austria, the dowager Queen of France, Louis and Phillippe's mother, and D'Artagnan's lover
- Judith Godrèche as Christine Bellefort, Raoul's fiancée whom Louis sought to make his mistress
- Peter Sarsgaard as Raoul, Athos's son who yearns to be a musketeer
- Edward Atterton as Lieutenant André, D'Artagnan's second in command
- Hugh Laurie as Pierre, Food Distributor and Chief Advisor to King Louis XIV
- David Lowe as Advisor to King Louis XIV

== Production ==
In this version, the "man in the iron mask" is introduced as prisoner number 64389000, based on the number related to his namesake found at the Bastille. The Château de Vaux-le-Vicomte acts as the primary residence of the king because Versailles was still early in its construction and years away from Louis establishing residence there.

== Reception ==
=== Box office ===
The film grossed $17 million in its opening weekend in second place at the US box office behind Titanic, another film starring Leonardo DiCaprio. It eventually grossed $56 million at the box office in the United States and Canada, and $126 million internationally, for a total of $183 million worldwide.

=== Critical response ===
On Rotten Tomatoes, the film has an approval rating of 32%, with an average rating of 5.5/10, based on 41 reviews. The site's critical consensus states: "Leonardo DiCaprio plays dual roles with diminishing returns in The Man in the Iron Mask, a cheesy rendition of the Musketeers' epilogue that bears all the pageantry of Alexandre Dumas' text, but none of its romantic panache." On Metacritic, it has a score of 48 out of 100, based on 18 reviews, indicating "mixed or average" reviews. Audiences polled by CinemaScore gave the film an average grade of "B+" on a scale of A+ to F.

Roger Ebert of the Chicago Sun-Times gave the film 2½ stars out of 4, criticizing Wallace's screenplay as "not well-focused", the film as featuring gratuitous scenes and taking too long to set up the plot for an audience no longer familiar with the story, but praised the performances of Gabriel Byrne and Anne Parillaud as standouts. Ebert concluded his review by writing: "Once all the pieces of the plot were in place, I was at least interested, if not overwhelmed; I could see how, with a rewrite and a better focus, this could have been a film of “Braveheart” quality instead of basically just a costume swashbuckler."

Kenneth Turan of the Los Angeles Times wrote that while the "production values are not lacking... Wallace, in his first try at directing, has been unable to unify the film's disparate elements. There's swordplay and tragedy, slapstick and romance, lots of DiCaprio for all those teenage girls--there's everything but a consistent style. And events are handled so broadly it's not surprising to learn that the director's inspiration was the Classics Illustrated version of the Dumas novel he read as a youth."

== Accolades ==
The film was nominated for the Best Original Score for an Adventure Film by the International Film Music Critics Award (IFMCA).

Depardieu was nominated for the European Film Academy Achievement in World Cinema Award for his role as Porthos. DiCaprio won a Golden Raspberry Award for Worst Screen Couple for his interactions as twins.

== Soundtrack ==
The Man in the Iron Mask (Original Soundtrack)

Soundtrack album by Nick Glennie-Smith
- Released: March 10, 1998
- Genre: Soundtrack
- Length: 50:34
- Label: Milan Records

Nick Glennie-Smith chronology
Home Alone 3 (1997)	The Man in the Iron Mask (Original Soundtrack) (1998)	The Lion King II: Simba's Pride (1998)

Soundtrack
Review scores
Source	Rating
AllMusic	4/5 stars
Filmtracks	3/5 stars

The soundtrack was written by the English composer Nick Glennie-Smith.

No.	Title	Length
1.	"Surrounded"	3:48
2.	"Heart of a King"	3:18
3.	"The Pig Chase"	3:28
4.	"The Ascension"	0:49
5.	"King for a King"	6:21
6.	"The Moon Beckons"	2:15
7.	"The Masked Ball"	1:28
8.	"A Taste of Something"	3:58
9.	"Kissy Kissie"	2:07
10.	"Training to Be King"	1:38
11.	"The Rose"	2:20
12.	"All Will Be Well"	1:06
13.	"All for One"	4:39
14.	"Greatest Mystery of Life"	1:49
15.	"Raoul and Christine"	1:51
16.	"It is a Trap"	2:45
17.	"Angry Athos"	1:55
18.	"Raoul's Letter"	1:00
19.	"The Palace"	0:26
20.	"Raoul's Death"	1:32
21.	"The Queen Approaches"	1:51
Total length:		50:34

The soundtrack has been used as backing for figure skating routines by Olympic figure skaters, such as Russian Alexei Yagudin.
