= Clive Ashborn =

English actor

- Occupation: Actor

Clive Ashborn is an English actor. He is best known for appearing in V for Vendetta as Guy Fawkes. He graduated from Academy of Live and Recorded Arts in 2001. He played the character Koleniko in Pirates of the Caribbean: Dead Man's Chest (2006) and Pirates of the Caribbean: At World's End (2007). He also appeared in the horror-thriller film The Love Witch (2016) as Professor King, a professor of the occult.

== Filmography ==
Year	Title	Role	Notes
2005	Experiment	Goran	
2005	V for Vendetta	Guy Fawkes	
2006	Pirates of the Caribbean: Dead Man's Chest	Koleniko (Dutchman)	
2007	Pirates of the Caribbean: At World's End	Koleniko (Dutchman)	
2012	Total Recall	Newscaster	
2016	The Love Witch	Professor King	
2016	Unreported	Mr. Scottsdale	
