= Appetite (Walter TV album) =

Studio album by Walter TV
- Released: April 20, 2012
- Genres: Indie rock; garage rock; psychedelic pop; lo-fi
- Length: 30:08
- Labels: AmDiscs; Sinderlyn (reissue)

Walter TV chronology
Appetite (2012)	Blessed (2015)

Appetite is the debut studio album by Canadian indie rock band Walter TV, first released in 2012. The band issued it themselves before it was picked up for a cassette release by AmDiscs later that year; Sinderlyn reissued it on vinyl and CD in August 2014.

The album was recorded at home, in the basement of a house in a beach town outside Vancouver, and was the band's first release to feature the involvement of Mac DeMarco, who is credited on it. Appetite received favourable reviews on both its original release and its reissue, with critics situating the band alongside Animal Collective and DeMarco's own work.

== Background and recording ==
Walter TV formed in Vancouver in 2011, with Pierce McGarry as its principal songwriter and singer alongside drummer Joe McMurray and bassist Simon Ankenman. Most of the debut album was worked up in the basement of a house in a beach town outside the city — a space the band later described as flooding regularly and having a beetle infestation, in a house on 13 acres of swampland they jokingly called haunted. The group recorded at home and outside conventional studios, an approach McGarry described as making the music come "from wherever and whatever is available".

The album is credited to Walter TV, though Exclaim! noted that although the group was presented as a trio, DeMarco — then rising to prominence as a solo artist — was listed as a full band member in the credits. Pitchfork subsequently stated that DeMarco was "not a full time member of the band" and that McGarry was "the principal member", while also describing Walter TV as a "Montreal via Vancouver band".

== Release ==
Appetite was released on April 20, 2012, initially as a self-issued Bandcamp release. In November 2012, AmDiscs issued the album on cassette, which brought it to wider attention: Pitchfork streamed the tape in full, noting that the band's ranks included DeMarco, McGarry and McMurray. Reviewing the cassette that December, Now called it "a fuzzy pop album available on cassette", and the album also circulated through Green Burrito Records.

Sinderlyn — described by The Revue as the sister label of Captured Tracks — reissued Appetite on August 26, 2014, marking its first appearance on vinyl and CD. A special edition LP bundled a poster, a zine and a DVD of short films made by McGarry and starring McMurray. The reissue was supported by a North American tour in October 2014, on which most dates were supported by Tonstartssbandht.

Two tracks from the album received videos. The first, for "Puka Shell Necklace", was directed by McGarry and released in 2013; it placed DeMarco and the band against a green screen and was noted by Pitchfork for its surfing, tropical-island and fight scenes. The second, for "Master Ludi", was an animated clip directed by Cole Kush and released in September 2014, featuring animated versions of the band including DeMarco.

== Composition ==
The album runs 30 minutes and eight seconds across ten tracks. Reviewers placed it within the lo-fi and psychedelic pop traditions while noting its restlessness. Now heard "crashing drums and arpeggiated guitar chords" and described McGarry's voice as the album's most versatile instrument, "sounding like a young Avey Tare of Animal Collective" as it moved "from high-pitched shrieks to strange, droney chanting"; the paper named "Africa" its top track. The Big Takeover called Appetite "frenetic and weird, a psychedelic garage pop opus", detecting heavy reverb over "deceptively complex rhythms" and comparing the band to White Fang and Paint Fumes.

The Revue argued that the band's songs were built on "deep and frenetic percussion, dense bass lines, and echoing, whirling vocals", and that the music drew on sounds from the Caribbean, the Middle East, north and western Africa, Polynesia and South and Southeast Asia — a reading supported, it suggested, by titles such as "Africa", "Hawaii", "Puka Shell Necklace" and "Siddhartha". It described "Africa" as having "the upbeat nature of a Vampire Weekend song but the psychedelic feel and hollow vocals of Thee Oh Sees", singled out "Puka Shell Necklace" as "a terrific track" and "Siddhartha" as "a stunning" closer, and praised the "sputtering, '80s-esque noodling" of opener "Nose Bleeding".

KJHK noted how the band was being marketed at the time, quoting a promoter's description of Walter TV as "if Mac DeMarco, Animal Collective and Vampire Weekend made a sweet music lovechild", and judged that while the claim was bold, "you can easily hear elements of each of the bands listed" — comparing the melodies to Animal Collective's Feels and Strawberry Jam and the rhythmic feel to Vampire Weekend's Contra. It concluded that the album "has character, an atmosphere" and that the band's songs were "more aggressive and less chill" than DeMarco's.

== Critical reception ==
Professional ratings
Review scores
Source	Rating
Now	NNNN (of four)

Appetite was well received. Now awarded the album its top rating of four Ns while conceding it was "a bit too noisy and messy at times", concluding that it was "still a fine addition to an impressive catalogue" — a reference to the busy year DeMarco was having. Reviewing the reissue two years later, The Big Takeover welcomed the wider release of "their oddball first album", calling it "a twisted, sordid celebration of honesty in home recording".

The Revue wrote that with Appetite, Walter TV had "made a record that leaves this writer wanting more", while KJHK called it "pretty flipping cool" and expressed the hope that the band would "make some more tasty jams in the future". Retrospectively, writers have treated the album as the foundation of the band's catalogue: a 2017 KJHK review described the band's later records as operating in "a similar but improved" register to Appetite, and The Red & Black noted that all of the band's albums, beginning with this one, run 30 minutes or less.

== Track listing ==
All tracks are written by Walter TV.

Appetite track listing
No.	Title	Length
1.	"Nose Bleeding"	3:06
2.	"In My Room"	2:37
3.	"Africa"	2:20
4.	"Neccessitty"	2:20
5.	"One Sweet Neo"	3:17
6.	"Master Ludi"	3:05
7.	"Lo Noise"	2:43
8.	"Hawaii"	2:59
9.	"Puka Shell Necklace"	3:37
10.	"Siddhartha"	4:04
Total length:		30:08

== Personnel ==
Walter TV

- Pierce McGarry – vocals, guitar
- Joe McMurray – drums
- Simon Ankenman – bass
- Mac DeMarco – credited as a band member
