= Samantha Robinson (American actress) =

British-American actress (born 1991)

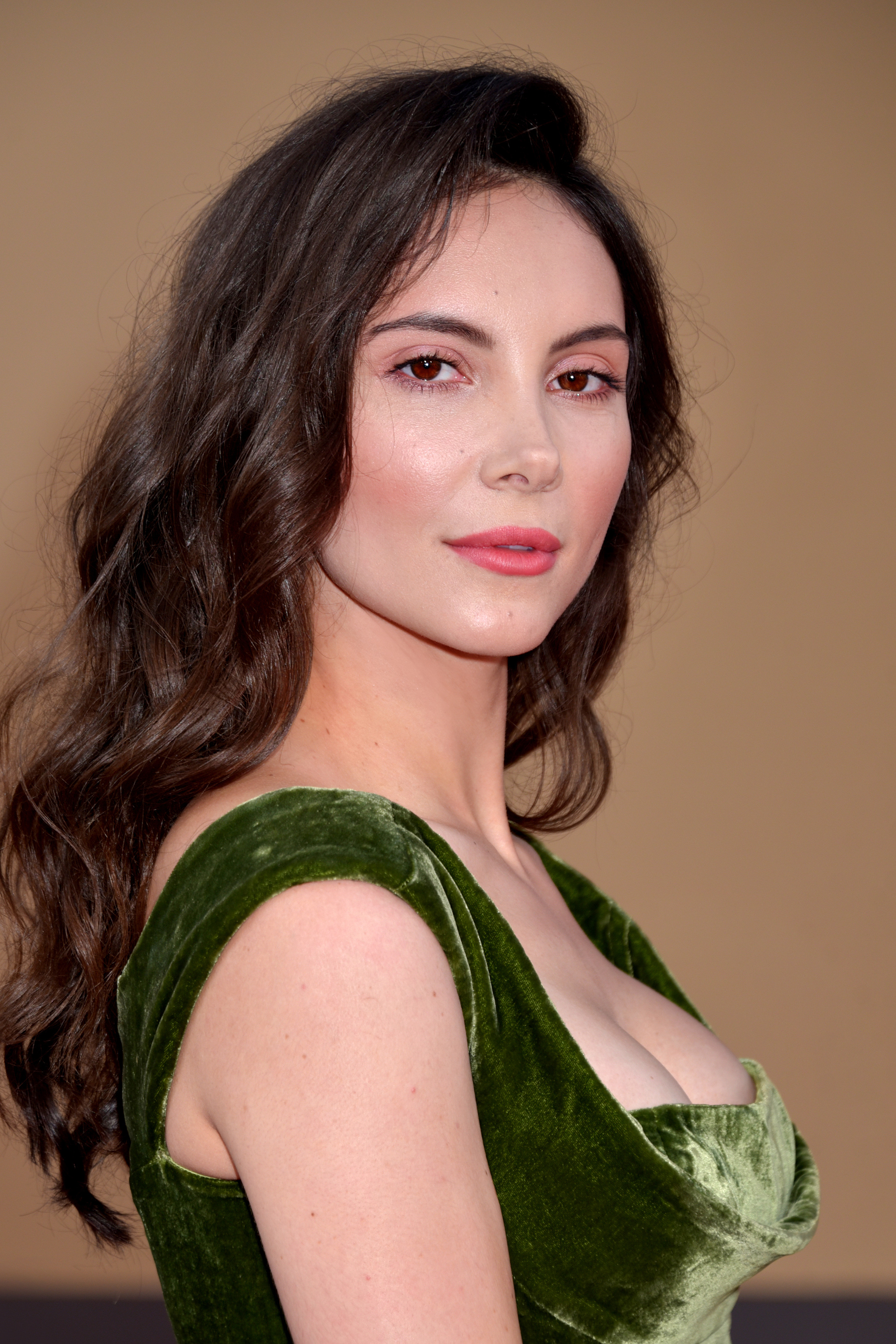
- Robinson in 2019
- Born: October 19, 1991 (age 35); New York City, U.S.
- Other name: Sam Robinson
- Education: University of California, Los Angeles
- Occupation: Actress
- Years active: 2012–present
- Known for: The Love Witch

Samantha Robinson (born October 19, 1991) is a British-American actress, best known for her roles in The Love Witch (2016) and Once Upon a Time in Hollywood (2019)

== Personal life ==
Robinson was born on October 19, 1991, in New York City to a Panamanian mother and an English father. When Robinson was a few years old, her family moved to London where she attended Queen's Gate School and the London Academy of Music and Dramatic Art. Her mother served as the Ambassador of the Republic of Panama to the United Kingdom from 2000 to 2004. When she was 14, Robinson and her mother relocated to Miami, Florida, where she attended the New World School of the Arts. In 2014, Robinson graduated from the University of California, Los Angeles with a concentration in acting.

Her mother died of ovarian cancer in 2019.

== Career ==
As a child, Robinson performed in a West End production of Joseph and the Amazing Technicolor Dreamcoat.

Robinson's early roles included the independent films Serenade of Sonnets, Dreamgirl, and Labyrinths, and the Lifetime TV movie Sugar Daddies.

Her breakthrough came in 2016 with the lead role in the film The Love Witch directed by Anna Biller. Audience and critic response to her performance was mostly positive. Frank Scheck, writing for The Hollywood Reporter, called Robinson's performance "intense" and "alluring in a way that goes far beyond her lithe dancer's body and stunning looks." Variety's Dennis Harvey said Robinson "does a great job encapsulating another era’s kitten-with-a-whip affectations." Charles Bramesco wrote in Rolling Stone that director Biller and Robinson "have created a three-dimensional version of the stock eroticized woman." The New Yorker ranked Robinson as one of the best actresses of 2016 for her role in film.

In 2019, Robinson portrayed Abigail Folger, heiress and Tate-LaBianca murder victim, in Quentin Tarantino's film Once Upon a Time in Hollywood.

== Filmography ==
=== Film ===
Year	Title	Role	Notes
2012	Dream Girl	Daniela	Short
2013	Misogynist	Sister 2	
2014	Sugar Daddies	Lea	
2015	Labyrinths	Cathy	
2016	The Love Witch	Elaine Parks	
2017	Doomsday Device	Courtney	TV movie
2018	Three Worlds	Ashley	
2018	Cam	Princess_X	
2019	Once Upon a Time in Hollywood	Abigail Folger	
2020	For Your Consideration	Heather	Short
2020	Jazzberry	Jazzberry	Short
2021	Take Me to Tarzana	Jane Avant	
2021	Topology of Sirens	Tracker Siren	
2021	Jazz Kitty	Jazz Kitty	Short
2022	Darwin Fick	Julia Louis-Childs	Short
2023	180 Days	Elise Levine	
2023	R.A.E.R. Beta 0027	Ophelia Price	Short
2023	Sugar Rag	Mother	Short
2023	Moving Day	Ellie	Short
2024	Good Bad Things	Charlotte	
2024	Hauntology	Christina	
2025	Crystal Cross	The Blonde	

=== Television ===
Year	Title	Role	Notes
2012	Everyone Wants Theirs	Natalie	Episode: "Reflex Theory of a Shy Killer"
2013	The 3 Minute Update	Herself/Host	Recurring Host: Season 2
2016	#ThisIsCollege	Sophie	Episode: "#Flashback Friday"
2019	Soundtrack	Young Margot	Episode: "Track 4: Margot and Frank"

=== Music video ===
Year	Song	Artist	Role
2022	"Lifetime"	SG Lewis	The Bride
