= Homeshake =

Music project of Peter Sagar

HOMESHAKE
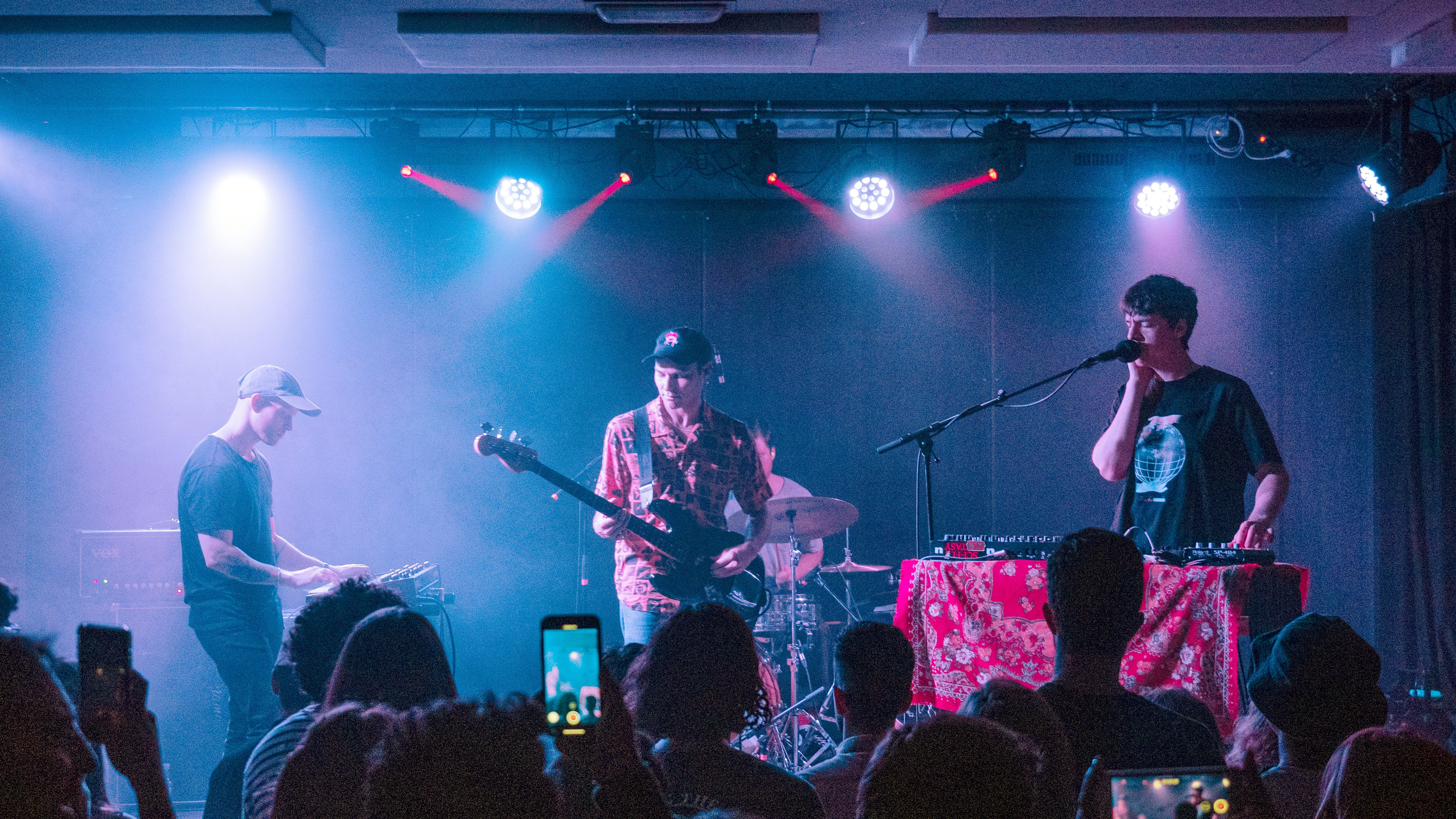
- Homeshake performing in 2019

Background information
- Origin: Montreal, Quebec, Canada
- Genres: Bedroom pop; hypnagogic pop; synthpop; alternative R&B
- Years active: 2012–present
- Labels: Fixture; Sinderlyn
- Members: Peter Sagar
- Website: Official website

Homeshake (stylized as HOMESHAKE) is the solo musical project of Montreal-based singer-songwriter and musician Peter Sagar.

== History ==
Featuring contributions from Mark Goetz, Greg Napier, and Brad Loughead, the project started in 2012. At the time, Peter Sagar was playing guitar with Mac DeMarco, whom Sagar was friends with since they were teenagers. Fixture Records released his debut cassette, The Homeshake Tape, in January 2013 and released a second, titled Dynamic Meditation in October 2013. In early 2014, he left Mac DeMarco's live band to focus on the Homeshake project. Shortly afterwards, Peter Sagar released his debut full-length album, In the Shower (2014).

His second album, Midnight Snack was released in 2015. In 2016, Homeshake partnered with fellow Canadian indie musician Alex Calder to release a charity split single. The release featured Calder's "Stuck Inside" on one side and Homeshake's "Nankhatai" on the other, with all proceeds benefiting the International Refugee Assistance Project. His third album under the project, Fresh Air was released in 2017. His fourth album, Helium was released in 2019. Homeshake released his fifth studio album, Under the Weather, in 2021, followed by CD Wallet in 2024.

== Discography ==
=== Studio albums ===
- In the Shower (2014)
- Midnight Snack (2015)
- Fresh Air (2017)
- Helium (2019)
- Under The Weather (2021)
- Pareidolia Catalog, Vols. 1-4 (2022)
- Pareidolia Catalog, Vols. 5-8 (2022)
- CD Wallet (2024)
- Horsie (2024)

=== Remix albums ===
- Helium Remixes (2019)

=== EPs ===
- Haircut (2020)

=== Singles ===
- "Making a Fool of You" (2014)
- "Cash Is Money" (2014)
- "I Don't Play" (2015)
- "Heat" (2015)
- "Faded" (2015)
- "Give It to Me" (2015)
- ";(" (2016)
- "Call Me Up" (2016)
- "Every Single Thing" (2017)
- "Khmlwugh" (2017)
- "Like Mariah" (2018)
- "Nothing Could Be Better" (2018)
- "Just Like My" (2019)
- "Another Thing" (2019)
- "Sesame" (2020)
- "I Know I know I know" (2021)
- "CD Wallet" (2024)
- "Basement" (2024)
- "Nothing 2 See" (2024)

=== Cassettes and mixtapes ===
- The Homeshake Tape (2013)
- Dynamic Meditation (2013)
