= The Love Witch =

2016 film by Anna Biller

- Theatrical release poster
- Directed by: Anna Biller
- Written by: Anna Biller
- Produced by: Anna Biller
- Starring: Samantha Robinson; Gian Keys; Laura Waddell; Jeffrey Vincent Parise; Jared Sanford; Robert Seeley; Jennifer Ingrum
- Cinematography: M. David Mullen
- Edited by: Anna Biller
- Music by: Anna Biller
- Production company: Anna Biller Productions
- Distributed by: Oscilloscope Laboratories
- Release dates: January 31, 2016 (IFFR); November 11, 2016 (United States)
- Running time: 120 minutes
- Country: United States
- Language: English
- Box office: $258,576

The Love Witch is a 2016 American comedy horror art film written, edited, directed, produced, and scored by Anna Biller. The film stars Samantha Robinson as Elaine Parks, a modern-day witch who uses spells and magic to get men to fall in love with her with disastrous results. Shot in Los Angeles and Arcata, California, it premiered at the International Film Festival Rotterdam. In May 2016, it was acquired for distribution at the Cannes Marché du Film by Oscilloscope Laboratories.

The film received a limited theatrical release in the United States on November 11, 2016. The Love Witch was shot on 35 mm film, and printed from an original cut negative. The film was acclaimed by critics for its playful tribute to 1960s horror and Technicolor films, combined with its serious inquiry into contemporary gender roles. In 2021, Robinson's portrayal of Elaine in the film was included on The New Yorker's list of the best film performances of the 21st century.

== Plot ==
Young witch Elaine Parks relocates to Arcata, California, a town that tolerates witchcraft, to start a new life following the recent death of her husband Jerry. She rents an apartment in a Victorian building owned by her mentor Barbara and maintained by interior decorator Trish Manning. Trish invites her to a tea room, where they are surprised by a visit from Trish's husband Richard, who becomes besotted with Elaine.

After Elaine performs a ritual to attract a new lover, local professor Wayne accepts her offer to cook him dinner at his cabin in the woods. She has him drink a concoction of hallucinogens and they have sex. He becomes emotional and delirious, which repulses Elaine. The next morning, Wayne has died. She buries him along with a witch bottle containing her urine and a used tampon.

When Trish leaves town for a few days, Elaine seduces Richard. They have sex, but Elaine demands they stop seeing each other when Richard becomes clingy and overly emotional.

When Wayne is reported missing, Officer Griff Meadows and his partner Steve discover Wayne's body at his cabin, along with the witch bottle, which leads them to Elaine. Griff invites Elaine to join him horseback riding. They come across a midsummer solstice festival held by the leaders of Elaine's coven. They propose a mock wedding. A handfasting ceremony is performed, where Elaine and Griff are gifted matching rings. Elaine realizes she is in love with Griff, though he does not reciprocate her feelings.

Griff tells Steve that their boss has ordered them to drop the case. When Steve inquires about the jimsonweed found in Wayne's system, Griff responds that Wayne was known to experiment with substances. Steve reveals that Jerry died of an overdose despite having no prior history of drug use, and accuses Griff of letting his feelings cloud his judgement. Griff punches Steve and storms off.

Richard commits suicide in the bathtub and is discovered by Trish. Trish confides in Elaine that she suspects Richard was having an affair, and that his paramour drove him to suicide. Trish puts on Elaine's ring, and Elaine forgets to retrieve it before leaving. Trish brings it to Elaine's apartment, where she tries on Elaine's wig, makeup, and lingerie before discovering a shrine dedicated to Elaine's deceased lovers, including Richard. Elaine returns and is attacked by Trish, who leaves, swearing Elaine will burn for what she has done.

Elaine meets Griff at a local burlesque club. The police have DNA evidence linking her to both Wayne and Richard, as well as items linking her to Richard's suicide. Elaine claims she simply buried Wayne in accordance with her religious customs after a night of lovemaking. Overhearing the exchange, other patrons assault Elaine, chanting "burn the witch". Griff fights them off and they flee.

At her apartment, Elaine presents Griff with a concoction that he tosses to the floor. Elaine sees a vision of her past victims professing their love. She retrieves an athame and stabs Griff multiple times, mirroring a painting on her wall. Clutching the bloody athame to her chest, Elaine smiles, imagining a mock wedding in which Griff declares his love and proposes to her before leading her away astride a unicorn.

== Cast ==
- Samantha Robinson as Elaine Parks
- Gian Keys as Griff Meadows
- Laura Waddell as Trish
- Jeffrey Vincent Parise as Wayne Peters
- Jared Sanford as Gahan
- Robert Seeley as Richard
- Jennifer Ingrum as Barbara
- Randy Evans as Steve
- Clive Ashborn as Professor King
- Lily Holleman as Shelley Curtis
- Stephen Wozniak as Jerry
- Elle Evans as Star
- Fair Micaela Griffin as Moon

== Themes ==
The Love Witch uses the figure of the witch as a metaphor for women in general, as both an embodiment of men's fears of women, and of women's own innate powers of intuition and as mothers and sorceresses. The lead character of the film is a young woman who uses magic to make men love her. Her character is an examination of the femme fatale archetype. The film embraces the camp of 1960s horror, examining issues of love, desire, and narcissism through a feminist perspective. Anna Biller is a feminist filmmaker whose take on cinema is influenced by feminist film theory.

== Production ==
While writing the script for The Love Witch, Biller had been reading relationship self-help books, and one particular piece of advice that stuck out to her was that if a woman wants to keep a man around, she should love him less than he loves her. She noticed a parallel between this advice and the female characters in classic cinema who love someone to death, such as Ellen in Leave Her to Heaven, so she decided to create the character Elaine in that same vein. Biller also studied witchcraft as research for the film, including trying her own witchcraft practice, and ended up decorating Elaine's apartment with colors from the Thoth tarot deck.

Casting for the film involved a typical audition process, and Biller has said that the most difficult role to fill was that of Trish. Even though she didn't intend for an English actress to play that role, she couldn't find any Americans who were right for it.

Biller chose Samantha Robinson for the lead role because she thought Robinson was "very poised and very self-possessed and she [had] a particular quality to her that's very different from most people nowadays". After Robinson accepted the role, she and Biller watched a series of classic movies featuring women with "great sociopathic performance". The two collaborated closely to develop the character of Elaine so that Robinson's own personality could shape the character, and after this workshop period Biller rewrote parts of the script to adjust for their discoveries.

Filming took place on a sound stage for two weeks, and then on specific locations for the rest of the shoot, including Eureka, California. The tea room scenes were shot in the Herald Examiner Building in Los Angeles.

The film is highly stylized with elaborate set and costume design and a color palette to match the aesthetic of a 1960s Technicolor film. Although the film emulates a 1960s look, the story is set in the present day and features modern cars and mobile phones. One of Biller's stated goals is to bring "female glamor" back to films, and she believes that including stylish, detailed sets and props will fulfill women's fantasies rather than men's, and give viewers more to look at on screen, rather than focusing their attention on the female characters as sexual objects. Anna Biller designed the sets and costumes to emulate the style of classic Hollywood films, a years-long process that involved searching for the necessary vintage furniture at salvage stores or creating it herself if she couldn't find one. For example, it took Biller 6 months to make Elaine's pentagram rug from scratch. Costume design was treated the same way: Biller found vintage pieces that worked well for the film, such as Gunne Sax dresses from the '60s and '70s, but many important pieces she had to make herself. In some cases, she found vintage clothing with fabric in colors that isn't sold anymore to rebuild as needed, in other cases she made pieces from scratch. She spent over a year working full-time designing and building the Renaissance costumes for the mock wedding scene.

Biller collaborated closely with her cinematographer M. David Mullen, who is an expert on period cinematography and who has been nominated for two Independent Spirit Awards, to create the hard lighting style characteristic of Classic Hollywood films. Diffusion filters were used on the lens for certain close up shots, and a special kaleidoscope lens was used for a drug trip sequence. For the driving scenes, rear projection photography was used to give glamour to the lead actress, and in tribute to the opening of the Hitchcock film The Birds.

The actors played their parts in a classic presentational acting style, with lead actress Samantha Robinson receiving accolades for her stylized performance.

The Love Witch is one of the last films to cut an original camera negative on 35 mm film. It was the only new (non-repertory) feature film presented at the 2016 International Film Festival Rotterdam on 35 mm film.

== Reception ==
=== Critical response ===
The Love Witch received universal acclaim. On the review aggregator website Rotten Tomatoes, the film holds an approval rating of 95% based on 114 reviews, with an average rating of 7.7/10. The website's critics consensus reads, "The Love Witch offers an absorbing visual homage to a bygone era, arranged subtly in service of a thought-provoking meditation on the battle of the sexes." Metacritic, which uses a weighted average, assigned the film a score of 82 out of 100, based on 27 critic reviews, indicating "universal acclaim". The film is listed as a "Metacritic must-see".

In a review for The New York Times, A. O. Scott wrote, "Ms. Biller's movie, like its heroine, presents a fascinating, perfectly composed, brightly colored surface. What's underneath is marvelously dark, like love itself."

The Love Witch is listed at number 41 on Rotten Tomatoes' list of the Top 100 Horror Movies. It made Rolling Stone's list of the top 10 Horror Movies of 2016, The New Yorker's list of the Best Movies of 2016, and IndieWire's list of The Best Movies of 2016.

=== Accolades ===
The Love Witch won in a tie for the Trailblazer Award and Best Costume Design at the Chicago Indie Critics Awards, and won the Michael Cimino Best Film Award at the American Independent Film Awards. The Dublin Film Critics' Circle awarded M. David Mullen Best Cinematography for The Love Witch. Samantha Robinson was nominated for Best Actress for the 2017 Fangoria Chainsaw Awards for her performance as Elaine, and Emma Willis was nominated for the Technical Achievement Award for her hair and makeup on the film by the London Film Critics' Circle. In a New York Times editorial, A. O. Scott mentioned Biller as worthy of receiving an Academy Award for Best Original Screenplay for The Love Witch.

== See also ==
- List of films about witchcraft
