= Sinderlyn =

American independent record label

- Parent company: Omnian Music Group
- Founded: 2014
- Founder: Mike Sniper
- Status: Active
- Genre: Indie rock; indie pop; lo-fi; psychedelic pop; electronic
- Country of origin: United States
- Location: Brooklyn, New York
- Official website: sinderlyn.com

Sinderlyn is an American independent record label based in Brooklyn, New York. It was founded in 2014 by Mike Sniper, the founder of Captured Tracks, as the first new label within his umbrella company Omnian Music Group; Sniper describes it as a sister label to Captured Tracks rather than an imprint of it. Announcing the label, Sniper said that "the mantra of Sinderlyn is that there is no mantra".

The label's roster has included Homeshake, Cults, The Fresh & Onlys, Walter TV, Sleigh Bells and Tama Gucci, and its releases are catalogued with the prefix LYN.

== History ==
=== Founding ===
Sinderlyn was announced in June 2014, when Sniper launched Omnian Music Group as a label group modelled on the Beggars Group. Where the group's other divisions were given defined roles — Flying Nun Records and Body Double and Manufactured Recordings for reissues, Fantasy Memory for avant-garde releases and 2MR for electronic music — Sinderlyn was described at its launch as the first new label under Omnian, with artists to be "signed organically", an aesthetic that would be "loose" and a greater emphasis on 7-inch singles and EPs than Captured Tracks. Ruben Mendez, previously of the Seattle label Hardly Art, was named as the label's head, and the first releases were announced as records by Walter TV, Girl Tears and Vaguess.

Sniper framed Sinderlyn as a way of expanding without diluting his main label. He told SLUG Magazine in 2015: "Our roster on Captured Tracks is full, so I developed Sinderlyn as a way to start working with more artists and also not dilute Captured Tracks by signing a ton of bands to it. It's not a sub-label [to Captured Tracks]; it's a sister label." By 2017 the label was also being used for artists who had come through major-label deals; Sniper told Forbes that year that Sinderlyn was "a sister label solely for established artists coming out of the major label process", citing the signing of Cults as an example.

=== Roster and releases ===
The label's first releases appeared in the second half of 2014: a Sinderlyn edition of Walter TV's Appetite (LYN001), Girl Tears' Tension (LYN-002) and Homeshake's debut album In the Shower (LYN003), the last issued in October 2014. Homeshake went on to release four further albums through the label: Midnight Snack (2015), Fresh Air (2017), Helium (2019) and Under the Weather (2021).

Further signings followed across genres, including the London dream pop group Novella, whose debut Land appeared in 2015, and the San Francisco garage rock band The Fresh & Onlys, whose sixth album Wolf Lie Down was released by Sinderlyn in 2017 as their debut for the label. Cults' third album Offering (2017) was released by Sinderlyn, followed by the EP Motels (2018) and the album Host (2020). In 2018 the label issued Sleigh Bells' mini-album Kid Kruschev on vinyl as a Record Store Day exclusive, following its digital release on the duo's own Torn Clean label.

By the 2020s the label's roster was centred on Cults, Homeshake, Jennifer Vanilla, Patrick Holland, Tama Gucci and TATYANA. Releases from that period include Cults' Host B Sides & Remixes (2022), Jennifer Vanilla's Castle in the Sky (2023), TATYANA's It's Over (2024) and Amour Armour (2025), and Tama Gucci's Notes to Self (2024), the last of these carrying catalogue number LYN072.

== Artists ==
Current

- Cults
- Homeshake
- Jennifer Vanilla
- Patrick Holland
- Tama Gucci
- TATYANA

Other artists

- The Fresh & Onlys
- Girl Tears
- Jackson MacIntosh
- Novella
- Sleigh Bells (vinyl releases only)
- Vaguess
- Walter TV

== Discography ==
Selected releases, with catalogue numbers. The label prints the prefix with or without a hyphen, so a release may be numbered LYN-001 or LYN001.

| Cat. no. | Artist | Title | Year |
|---|---|---|---|
| LYN-001 | Walter TV | Appetite | 2014 |
| LYN-002 | Girl Tears | Tension | 2014 |
| LYN-003 | Homeshake | In the Shower | 2014 |
| LYN-005 | Novella | Land | 2015 |
| LYN-006 | Walter TV | Blessed | 2015 |
| LYN-007 | Homeshake | Midnight Snack | 2015 |
| LYN-023 | Homeshake | Fresh Air | 2017 |
| LYN-030 | The Fresh & Onlys | Wolf Lie Down | 2017 |
| LYN-034 | Cults | Offering | 2017 |
| LYN-035 | Jackson MacIntosh | My Dark Side | 2018 |
| LYN-036 | Sleigh Bells | Kid Kruschev (vinyl) | 2018 |
| LYN-043 | Cults | Motels (EP) | 2018 |
| LYN-045 | Homeshake | Helium | 2019 |
| LYN-053 | Cults | Host | 2020 |
| LYN-058 | Homeshake | Under the Weather | 2021 |
| LYN-066 | Tama Gucci | Notes to Self | 2024 |
| LYN-067 | TATYANA | It's Over | 2024 |
| LYN-072 | TATYANA | Amour Armour | 2025 |
