= Eric Kelly (boxer) =

American boxer

Personal information
- Born: Eric Lamar Kelly; September 20, 1980 (age 45) Titusville, Florida, United States
- Weight: Middleweight
- Website: http://erickellylife.com

Boxing career
- Stance: Orthodox

Boxing record
- Wins: 104
- Losses: 14

Eric Lamar Kelly (born September 20, 1980) is a former four-time national boxing champion, former member of the U.S. Olympic Boxing team, a viral video star, celebrity trainer, sports correspondent, and brand ambassador.

== Early life and education ==
Kelly was born in Titusville, Florida and moved to the Bed-Stuy section of Brooklyn, New York as a child with his father and graduated from the now-defunct Thomas Jefferson High School. Kelly attended the United States Olympic Education Center (USOEC) on the campus of Northern Michigan University in Marquette, Michigan.

== Boxing career ==
Encouraged into boxing by his father, Kelly trained at the New Bed-Stuy Boxing Center under George Washington, Harry Keitt & Dylan “Blimp” Parsley Sr., and at Gleason's under the tutelage of Hector Rocca, under whom he won his 1st national title at 16.

Kelly achieved success as 1997 Junior Olympic Boxing Champion, 1998 USA Boxing Under-19 National Champion, 1998 National Golden Gloves bronze medalist, and 1999 American Boxing Classic Champion. He was a two-time New York Daily News Golden Glove Champion, and the 2000 National Golden Glove Champion. In 2000 he was named an alternate for the U.S. Olympic Boxing Team at the Sydney Games. In 2001, ranked number one in the country, Kelly lost in the finals of the U.S. Amateur Boxing Championship in 2001 to Andre Ward. Ward, then unranked, would go on to earn a gold medal at the 2004 Olympics in Athens.

== Eye injury ==
While training at the USOEC, Kelly suffered nerve damage to his left eyelid after being hit in the face with a pool cue during a bar fight. The injury effectively ended his boxing career.

== Boxing trainer ==
After becoming a father and working a series of blue-collar jobs, Kelly began cold-calling various boxing gyms and was offered a spot as a trainer at Church Street Boxing Gym. Kelly’s aggressive and blunt style, often berating the white-collared clients he was working out, was captured and distributed in video form produced and published by Animal New York.

The success of the video lead Kelly to sign with talent agency William Morris, and media appearances including one on Comedy Central’s Daily Show.

As the video amassed views, Kelly’s clientele began to include not just Wall Street businessmen, but celebrities as well. Famous clients include rapper Pusha-T, football player Brandon Marshall, political pundit Meghan McCain, Roots musician Black Thought.

Since Church Street, Kelly has trained at Gleason’s Gym in Brooklyn’s DUMBO section.

In summer 2017, Kelly opened SouthBoX by Eric Kelly in the South Bronx’s Mott Haven section. The gym is seen as a part of the area’s ongoing, and sometimes controversial, gentrification.

Kelly is MMA competitor Oluwale Bamgbose's boxing coach and debuted in the fighter's corner for his December 16, 2017 bout at UFC on Fox 26.

== Work in media ==
Kelly is a video correspondent for VICE Sports. In a series of pieces, Kelly is put into unique situations including eating hot dogs with competitive eater Takeru Kobayashi, serving as working media at MLB’s All-Star Game, and tailgating at a NASCAR race.

In 2016 Kelly began covering boxing and pop culture, both editorially and on a podcast, at TheOutsideGame.com, part of the FanSided network.

== Commercial work ==
Kelly has served as a brand ambassador and Combat Training Coach with Reebok, and works with apparel company RVCA. In 2016 he appeared in a Powerade commercial starring 2016 Olympic gold medalist Shakur Stevenson. In January 2021 Kelly appeared briefly in the music video "Dragon Fire" for the Hip Hop artist R.A the Rugged Man alongside members of Wu-tang Clans Ghostface Killah, Masta Killa and Hip Hop pioneer Kool G Rap.

== Acting ==
Kelly had a supporting role as assistant boxing trainer in Jack Hutson's 2023 film Day of the Fight alongside Ron Perlman, Joe Pesci and Michael Pitt. Pitt has been a client of Kelly's since 2009.
