= Guards (band) =

American rock band

- Origin: New York City
- Genres: Indie rock, dream pop, new wave, power pop
- Years active: 2010–present
- Labels: Partisan Records, Black Bell Records
- Members: Richie James Follin; Loren Humphrey; Kaylie Church
- Website: guards.bandcamp.com

Guards is an American rock band consisting of Richie Follin, Loren Humphrey, and Kaylie Church. They released their debut album, In Guards We Trust, in February 2013.

== History ==
=== 2010: Formation ===
Guards formed in New York City when Follin finished a European tour and went to a recording studio. He began writing and recording with his sister's band, Cults, and he ended up singing the songs. They put the songs on the internet and began to get show offers, so he formed Guards consisting of himself, Loren Humphrey and Kaylie Church. Follin and Humphrey were originally of the band The Willowz. The trio caught the attention of 3 Syllables Records and they released their eponymous debut EP on the label in 2010. They released their first single, "Resolution of One", on Small Plates Records in December 2010. The single was re-released in May 2011, on Kitsuné Musique, with B-sides "Hear You Call" and "Swimming After Dark".

NPR stated the band has "a sound deconstructed through the minds of musicians who look more to memories than they do to the future, and in the process find something that sounds like a new discovery". Dazed and Confused stated that "the songs are uncompromisingly raw harnessing pessimistic heartache to craft tracks about birth, death and any emotional malaise you might experience in between”. The Guardian simply stated, "It's pretty fucking impressive”.

=== 2013: Debut album ===
The band released their first full length album In Guards We Trust in 2013. The Wall Street Journal touted the record as “one of the years best albums”, and Pitchfork proclaimed “...slack verses with palm-muted guitars give way to a monster chorus delivered with the confidence that tells you Guards know they have a hit on their hands". NME would refer to the band as “Cali reverb scuzz kings”. NPR stated that “at a time in music when pop, rock, country and hip-hop acts all strain to create anthems that will inspire sing- along devotion in large-size audiences, Guards — a band that's only been around for a few years and has released comparatively little music — is already well on its way to giving the anthem form more interest and gravitas than musicians with far more experience”. Stereogum called the album “widescreen indie-pop garnished with epic hooks and hum-along melodies...[the album] takes a simple new-wave riff and builds layers upon it, reaching soaring, cinematic climaxes on the chorus, showcasing singer Richie Follin’s yearning vocal, always in service of the song’s central and indelible hook”. The Los Angeles Times proclaimed, “Guards toy with loud-soft dynamics, and touch on pastel harmonies and thick, almost ‘60s garage rock riffs, but it’s the back and forth between keyboardist Kaylie Church and Richie Follin that sets the group apart”. IFC premiered the band's video for "Silver Lining" and stated that “it’s a boisterous and driving track that shows Guards doing what it does best: making raucous rock with a retro edge and undeniable appeal”.

Guards toured worldwide the entire year in support of their debut album, opening for such acts as Queens of the Stone Age, MGMT, Two Door Cinema Club, Palma Violets. They also played in festivals such as Coachella, Lollapalooza, and Primavera Sound.

The song "I Know It's You" off the album was featured in FIFA 14 and in the film Endless Love. The song "Silver Lining" is featured in the Big Ten Conference's "Maps" television commercial.

== Discography ==
=== Albums ===
Year	Title
2013	In Guards We Trust: Released: February 5, 2013; Label: Black Bell Records; Format: CD, digital download, 12" vinyl
2019	Modern Hymns: Released: May 22, 2019; Label: Black Bell Records; Format: CD, digital download, 12" vinyl

=== EPs ===
Year	Title
2010	Guards: Released: July 10, 2010; Label: 3 Syllables Records; Format: digital download, 12" vinyl
2019	Beacon: Released: April 12, 2019; Label: richie james eaton music; Format: digital download

=== Singles ===
Year	Title
2010	"Resolution of One": Released: December 2010; Label: Small Plates Records; Format: 12" vinyl
2011	"Resolution of One": Released: May 9, 2011; Label: Kitsuné Musique; Format: 12" vinyl, digital download
2011	"Do It Again": Released: December 6, 2011; Label: White Iris Records; Format: 12" vinyl, digital download
2013	"Ready to Go": Released: April 19, 2013; Label: Black Bell Records; Format: 12" vinyl, digital download

== Members ==
- Richie James Follin – vocals, guitar
- Loren Humphrey – drums
- Kaylie Church – keyboards, vocals
