= Richie Follin =

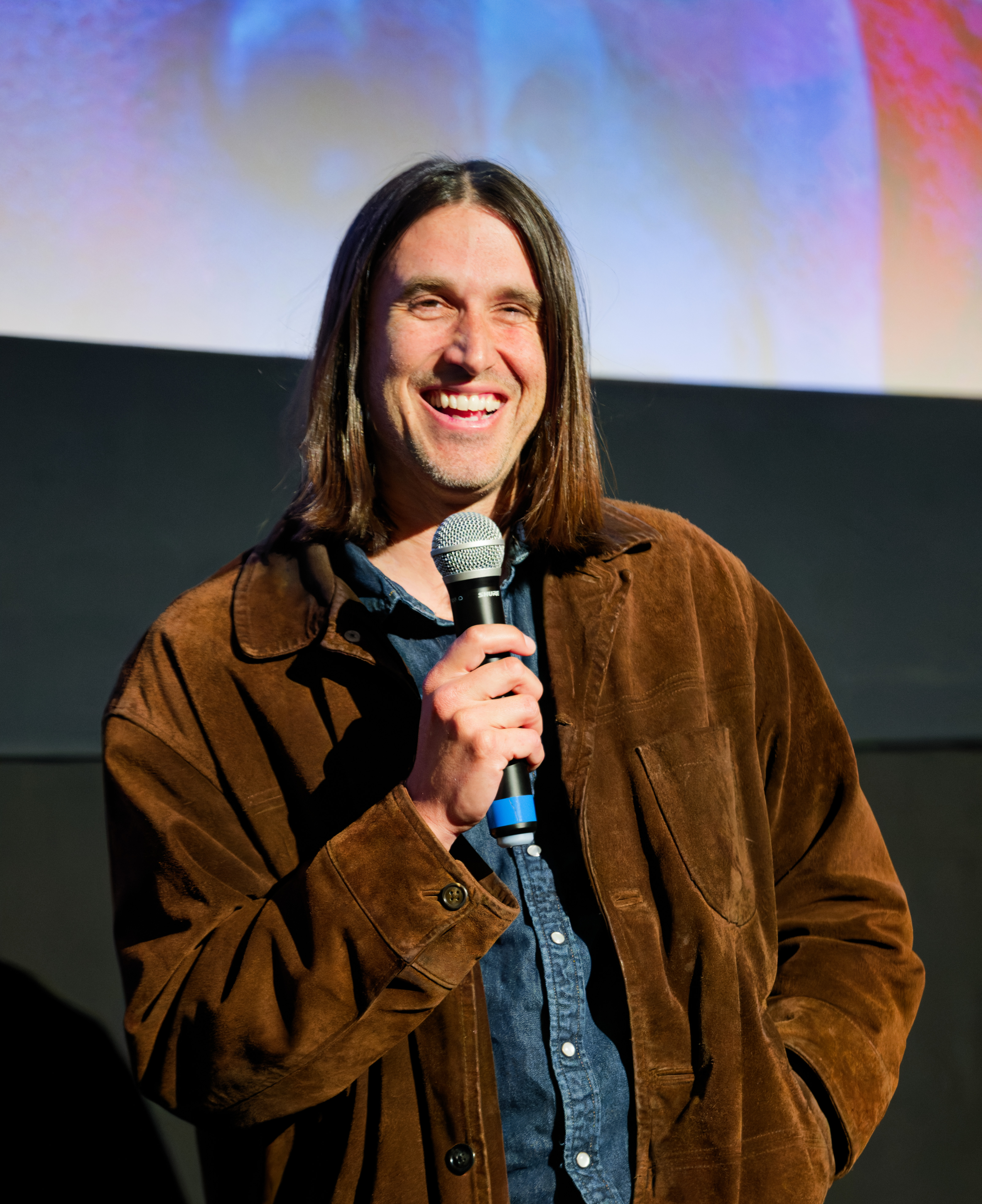
- Richie James Follin at the Seattle International Film Festival in 2026

Background information
- Born: Richie James Follin; May 22, 1983 (age 43)
- Origin: Long Beach, California, U.S.
- Occupations: Musician, singer-songwriter, writer, actor, filmmaker
- Instruments: Guitar, vocals, keyboards, drums
- Years active: 2001–present
- Labels: Columbia, UK Dim Mak, Sympathy for the Record Industry, Father/Daughter, Thrill Me Records, Velvet Vision, Black Bell Records

Richie James Follin (born May 22, 1983) is an American musician, writer, actor, and filmmaker. He is known for his work with The Willowz, Guards, Cults, CRX, Follin, and his solo music and film projects.

== Early life ==
Richie James Follin moved frequently as a child, living in San Francisco, New York City, Los Angeles, San Diego, and Orange County, and attended art school in Italy for high school. Follin grew up going to acting auditions as a child where he would frequently change the characters dialogue leading him to eventually pursue screenwriting. Follin grew up attending Catholic and Christian schools. At age 12, he picked up guitar after attending Lollapalooza 1996, to see his stepfather Paul Kostabi (founding member of White Zombie and Youth Gone Mad) perform with the group Psychotica. Later, witnessing Kostabi record with Dee Dee Ramone inspired Follin to begin writing music in his teens. As a teenager, he worked for his uncle Mark Kostabi, taking large-format photographs of artworks and stretching canvases in his art studio "Kostabi World".

== Career ==
=== The Willowz ===
The Willowz are a garage punk rock band from Anaheim, California, formed in 2002 by Richie James Follin (guitar and lead vocals) and Jessica Reynoza (bass and vocals). The first drummer was the drummer for GG Allin and the Murder Junkies. The band has toured worldwide and released four studio albums, blending punk, garage rock, soul, folk, and power pop.

Their debut 7-inch appeared on Posh Boy Records in 2002, followed by a self-titled album in 2003 produced by Paul Kostabi and Follin. Filmmaker Michel Gondry featured their songs in Eternal Sunshine of the Spotless Mind and The Science of Sleep, directed the video for “I Wonder,” and introduced the band to XL Records.

The second album, Talk in Circles (2005, Sympathy for the Record Industry), was named one of Rolling Stone’s top 50 albums of the year. The Willowz garnered critical acclaim from Spin, Nylon, Rolling Stone, and The Village Voice, and their music has been embraced by skateboarders. Subsequent albums—Chautauqua (2007) and Everyone (2009)—explored dream punk, heavier guitar riffs, and power pop, with songs featured in commercials, HBO spots, and the Netflix documentary I’ll Sleep When I’m Dead.

=== Guards ===
Guards is an American rock band formed by Richie Follin, later joined by Loren Humphrey (drums) and Kaylie Church (keyboards, vocals). The band released their debut EP in 2010 and their first full-length album, In Guards We Trust, in 2013.

Guards has received critical acclaim from NPR, The Wall Street Journal, Pitchfork, NME, Stereogum, and The Los Angeles Times. Their songs have achieved widespread recognition: **“Silver Lining”** is the official Big Ten theme song, beloved by college football fans, while **“I Know It’s You”** was featured in the FIFA 14 video game. Guards’ energetic sound has resonated with skateboarders, and a Guards music video was the first-ever video sent to Snapchat users, made specifically for the platform.

The band has toured worldwide, opening for acts such as Queens of the Stone Age, MGMT, Two Door Cinema Club, and Palma Violets, and has played festivals including Coachella, Lollapalooza, and Primavera Sound. Guards released their second album, Modern Hymns, in 2019, and are preparing a new album serving as the soundtrack to Richie Follin’s film Crystal Cross.

=== CRX ===
In 2016, Follin joined the American rock band CRX, formed in Los Angeles, playing guitar, keyboards, and backing vocals. He co-wrote the lead single **“Ways to Fake It”** with Nick Valensi, produced by Josh Homme, released on Columbia Records. The band released their debut album, New Skin, through Columbia Records on October 28, 2016.

=== Follin ===
Follin is a musical project formed by Richie Follin and his sister Madeline Follin (of Cults) in 2016. They released a digital single and cassette tape, “Memories” b/w “Roxy,” through Father/Daughter Records.

=== Cults ===
Follin was a member of the live band for Cults, contributing guitar and vocals on **“You Know What I Mean”** from their first album. He also recorded in the studio with the band and appeared as the drummer in the **“Oh My God”** music video.

=== Music Production Work ===
Follin has collaborated in the studio with Pelle Almqvist of The Hives, contributing pre-production to songs featured on The Death of Randy Fitzsimmons and Forever Forever The Hives. In 2009, he performed live with The Hives in full band regalia, performing the guitar solo on “Diabolic Scheme.” He also played guitar for Lala Brooks of The Crystals. Follin has scored multiple documentaries for CNN and ESPN, as well as commercials and campaigns for brands including Chevrolet, Vice, HBO, Pepsi, and Wal-Mart.

=== Filmmaking ===
In 2024, Follin wrote, directed, produced, acted in, and composed the original soundtrack for his debut feature film, Crystal Cross, which premiered at the Austin Film Festival. The film is a road-trip story across modern America, exploring contemporary culture, faith, oddball love, and identity.

=== Michel Gondry ===
Early in his career, Follin was discovered by filmmaker Michel Gondry, who described wanting to be “the Warhol to his Velvet Underground.” Gondry directed the music video for Follin’s song **“I Wonder”**, featured Follin’s music in Eternal Sunshine of the Spotless Mind and The Science of Sleep, had Follin’s band perform at the premiere of The Science of Sleep, and helped secure record deals on XL Records and Rex Records. Gondry also joined Follin’s band on drums for a Manhattan art opening.

== Personal life ==
Follin has two children, a daughter and a son. He is a member of the Cherokee Nation.
