= Wide Awake =

Wide Awake or Wideawake may refer to:

== Places ==
- Wide Awake, South Carolina, US
- Prestonville, Kentucky, US, formerly Wideawake
- Wideawake Airfield or RAF Ascension Island, a British military base

== Books and publications ==
- Wide Awake (magazine), a children's magazine 1875–1893
- Wide Awake (novel), a 2006 novel by David Levithan
- Project Wideawake, a fictional US government program in the Marvel Comics universe
- Wide Awake, a Christian student publication, notable for Rosenberger v. University of Virginia

== Film and television ==
- Wide Awake (1998 film), an American film by M. Night Shyamalan
- Wide Awake (2007 film), a South Korean film
- "Wide Awake" (Killing Eve), a 2019 television episode

== Music ==
- Wideawake (band), an American alternative rock band

=== Albums ===
- Wide Awake (Frazier Chorus album) or the title song, 1995
- Wide Awake (Joe McElderry album) or the title song, 2010
- Wide Awake (Parachute album), 2016
- Wide Awake (Sonny Fodera album), 2021
- Wide Awake!, by Parquet Courts, or the title song, 2018
- Wide Awake, by Michael Schulte, 2012
- Wide Awake, by Picture Me Broken, 2010

=== Songs ===
- "Wide Awake" (Eric Saade song), 2016
- "Wide Awake" (Katy Perry song), 2012
- "Wide Awake", by Audioslave from Revelations, 2006
- "Wide Awake", by Autopilot Off from Autopilot Off, 2002
- "Wide Awake", by Beach Fossils from Beach Fossils, 2010
- "Wide Awake", by Gravity Kills from Superstarved, 2002
- "Wide Awake", by Jake Owen from Barefoot Blue Jean Night, 2011
- "Wide Awake", by Kenna from Make Sure They See My Face, 2007
- "Wide Awake", by Lacuna Coil from Shallow Life, 2009
- "Wide Awake", by Man Overboard from Heart Attack, 2013
- "Wide Awake", by Petit Biscuit, 2019
- "Wide Awake", by the Twang from Love It When I Feel Like This, 2007

== Other uses ==
- Wide Awakes, a 19th-century American political organization
- Wideawake hat, a broad-brimmed felt hat
- Sooty tern or wideawake, a tropical seabird
