= Empty Estate =

EP by Wild Nothing
- Released: May 14, 2013
- Recorded: Gary's Electric (Brooklyn, New York)
- Genres: Indie rock; dream pop
- Length: 28:43
- Language: English
- Labels: Captured Tracks (US); Bella Union (UK)
- Producer: Jack Tatum

Wild Nothing chronology
Nocturne (2012)	Empty Estate (2013)	Life of Pause (2016)

Empty Estate is an EP by American indie rock act Wild Nothing, released on May 14, 2013, on Captured Tracks in the US and Bella Union in the UK. Produced by founding member and primary recording artist Jack Tatum, the EP was released nine months after the band's second studio album, Nocturne (2012).

Regarding the release, Jack Tatum stated: "I feel like I’ve accomplished in seven songs, on this EP, what I really wanted to do with Nocturne, which is to find a way to compromise all of the things [I am] musically. I think I did that more with this EP than I have everything in the past."

== Background and recording ==
In 2012, Wild Nothing released its second studio album, Nocturne, to widespread critical acclaim and a significantly increasing fanbase. Influenced by the band's busy tour schedule, songwriter and primary recording artist Jack Tatum began crafting a follow-up EP, stating: "I had a lot of frustration in touring Nocturne, kind of in my own head really, not to do with anyone else. [...] It’s such a stupid thing to complain about and I am aware of that, but when you do it constantly it sort of deadens you to your own music and you kinda hate your own songs after a while. I started to realize that I wasn’t happy with what I’d been doing."

Tatum subsequently began writing and recording the EP during a three-month break from touring at the end of 2012. Tatum noted, "It’s pretty difficult for me to write on tour; I usually build up general ideas on tour – not necessarily even musical ideas, just whatever’s inspiring me at that moment. As much as I love touring, I’m always so happy to be home, and I seem to have these creative bursts when we first get off the road – I guess that’s how the new EP came about."

== Writing and composition ==
Prior to recording the EP, Tatum was influenced by David Bowie, Brian Eno and David Byrne, stating: "This EP is rooted in [the] past year [where] I got on this kick of rediscovering massive influential artists and digging deep into their records. Almost like researching why this person is so respected, like David Bowie, Brian Eno, and David Byrne. So I listened to a lot of Talking Heads, Eno’s rock albums, as well as his early ambient albums, and of course, Bowie’s Berlin trilogy."

Regarding the EP's track listing, Tatum noted, "Some of the songs are very poppy but I tried to make them stranger, awkward or weird at certain points."

== Release ==
Regarding the decision to write and record an EP not long after Nocturne's release, Tatum noted: "You can do whatever you want with [an EP], like it’s a free pass. People don’t really expect as much from an EP, so you’re free to do what you want to do. And that is what was so empowering about this particular experience for me. I never needed to take a step back and obsess over what kind of music I was making. I didn’t think that some people might think it’s weird that I’m making this electronic pop song or I’m making this really ambient, droney song. I just did what I wanted to do and it felt good not to think about the outside perspective. I do that so much. I spend a lot of time worrying about what other people think. But this EP was the most fun I’ve had writing and recording in a long time. [...] A lot of times bands put out EPs with the leftover tracks that didn’t make it onto the album for some reason. But this was not like that for me."

== Artwork ==
Empty Estate's artwork features paintings by New York-based artist Eric Shaw. Regarding Shaw, Jack Tatum stated, "[He's] a friend of a friend. I sent the record to a friend of mine and he said, “This sounds a lot like what my friend’s art looks like.” So I browsed through tons of his paintings and really fell in love. It really fit what I was trying to do with this EP. I almost feel like while I was making it I kind of thought of it as pop art in a way."

== Critical reception ==
Professional ratings
Aggregate scores
Source	Rating
Metacritic	72/100
Review scores
Source	Rating
AllMusic	4/5 stars
Consequence of Sound	3.5/5 stars
Paste	7.3/10
Pitchfork	6.6/10

Empty Estate received positive reviews upon its release. At Metacritic, which assigns a normalized rating out of 100 to reviews from mainstream critics, the album has received an average score of 72, based on 13 reviews, indicating "generally favorable reviews". AllMusic writer Fred Thomas said: "Empty Estate, while every bit as polished (if not more so) than the fancifully recorded Nocturne, sets itself apart by exploring different absent-minded stylistic detours on almost every track. [...] Ultimately any of these tracks could be the jumping-off point for an entire album's worth of material, and hearing them all together makes for a more interesting presentation." Consequence of Sound's Amanda Koellner issued the album with a positive review, praising the track, "A Dancing Shell": "Funky dance track (yes, you read that correctly) “A Dancing Shell”, with its symphony of synths and addictive groove, is so impressive that you begin to wonder why Tatum didn't slap a few more tracks on the record and call it a full-length. A trippy black and white photo graced the cover of Gemini, a teal and peach design on Nocturne, and this EP is dressed exactly how it sounds: a little more vibrant and a little more stoned."

Ian Cohen of Pitchfork, however, gave the album a mixed review, stating: "[Tatum's] second EP, Empty Estate, has the same relationship to its full-length predecessor as the Golden Haze EP did his debut: it's noticeably bolder, sounds more expensive and crafted with live performance in mind. But it's also the first time Tatum's music hasn't improved on what came before." Paste''s Mack Hayden noted, "It’s no Nocturne or Gemini, but Tatum still proves to be a visionary consistent in his trajectory of progressing confidence. It’s hard to call this a misstep at all, but its best quality is keeping hope alive for what will come next."

== Track listing ==
All tracks are written by Jack Tatum.

No.	Title	Length
1.	"The Body in Rainfall"	2:51
2.	"Ocean Repeating (Big-Eyed Girl)"	4:00
3.	"On Guyot"	5:57
4.	"Ride"	3:25
5.	"Data World"	4:14
6.	"A Dancing Shell"	3:47
7.	"Hachiko"	4:29
Total length:		28:43

== Personnel ==
Musicians

- Jack Tatum - vocals, guitar, bass guitar, piano, synthesizer, percussion, drum programming
- Tommy Gardner - drums (1 and 5)
- Al Carlson - baritone saxophone (6)

Recording personnel

- Jack Tatum - producer
- Al Carlson - engineering, mixing
- Claudius Mittendorfer - mixing (4)

Artwork

- Eric Shaw - paintings and illustrations
- Ryan McCardle - design and layout
