= Hold (album) =

Studio album by Wild Nothing
- Released: October 27, 2023
- Genre: Synth-pop; sophisti-pop; dream pop; indie pop
- Length: 40:26
- Label: Captured Tracks
- Producer: Jack Tatum

Wild Nothing chronology
Indigo (2018)	Hold (2023)

Singles from Hold
- 1. "Headlights On" Released: August 16, 2023; 2. "Suburban Solutions" Released: September 12, 2023; 3. "Dial Tone" Released: October 3, 2023

Hold is the fifth studio album by American indie rock project Wild Nothing, led by musician Jack Tatum. It was released on October 27, 2023, through Captured Tracks. The album marks their first studio release in over five years, following Indigo (2018). The album features contributions by Tatum's wife Dana, as well as fellow musicians Hatchie, Molly Burch, Becca Mancari, and Tommy Davidson of Beach Fossils.

== Background ==
Tatum explained that he sat with the record for a "very long time", leading his sentiments ahead of the release to be "excited and apprehensive". His first self-produced project since Gemini (2010), it also constitutes his first album as a father. According to Tatum, it explores "existential themes" without taking itself too seriously, unafraid to be either "pop" or "strange", "fun" or "sad", and reflects what the musician loves doing and feels "grateful" for. Furthermore, it focuses on "existential questions", such as the "ego", "suburbia" and "right" life choices. Hold is set to "steer" his music in a "fresh direction". A press release described the project as "more electronic" and "dance-inspired" than his previous records. The album was preceded by three singles: "Headlights On" featuring Hatchie, a track that felt "incredibly cathartic" to Tatum, on August 16, 2023, "Suburban Solutions" on September 12, and "Dial Tone" on October 3.

== Critical reception ==
Professional ratings
Review scores
Source	Rating
AllMusic	4.5/5 stars
Far Out	2.5/5 stars
Paste	7.2/10
Pitchfork	7.5/10
Clash	7/10
The Line of Best Fit	8/10

Reviewing the album for Pitchfork, Jude Noel wrote that the album "adopts a refreshing sense of whimsy. Self-producing for the first time since 2010, Tatum dabbles in one-off genre experiments, toys with eccentric lyrical devices, and embraces a maximalist ethos that sets this album apart". Andy Steiner of Paste described it as "a pandemic record, another scrappy home studio record, and another record about growing up, trying to find meaning and settling down. Its title, Hold, is correct: The suburbs haunt Wild Nothing". AllMusic's Matt Collar called it "one of his most lush and pristine sounding albums" and wrote that "he has crafted an album of shimmering sophistic-pop magic that sounds like it is a lost gem from the late '80s". Tyler Golsen, reviewing the album for Far Out, summarized it as "a straightforward dive into the bright lights of 1980s synthpop", ultimately finding it to be "little more than a pleasant diversion, one with real skill and joy but also with few surprises".

== Track listing ==
All tracks are written by Jack Tatum.

Hold track listing
No.	Title	Length
1.	"Headlights On"	3:40
2.	"Basement El Dorado"	2:54
3.	"The Bodybuilder"	4:17
4.	"Suburban Solutions"	3:42
5.	"Presidio"	3:40
6.	"Dial Tone"	3:22
7.	"Histrion"	4:02
8.	"Prima"	4:27
9.	"Alex"	4:05
10.	"Little Chaos"	0:50
11.	"Pulling Down the Moon (Before You)"	5:27
Total length:		40:26

== Personnel ==
Musicians

- Jack Tatum – vocals, bass guitar, drums, guitar, piano, synthesizer, drum programming
- Tommy Davidson – drum programming and additional production on (track 1)
- Jorge Elbrecht – additional production, guitar, keyboards (track 1)
- Steven Chen – saxophone (track 1)
- Harriette Pilbeam – backing vocals (track 1)
- Pinson Chanselle – drums, percussion (tracks 2, 3, 6, 8, 9, 11)
- Becca Mancari – backing vocals (track 2)
- Daniel Clarke – piano (tracks 3, 11)
- Molly Burch - backing vocals (track 4)
- Dana Tatum - backing vocals (track 4)
- Calder Tatum - Leaves (track 11)
- Drew Carroll - Additional engineering (track 2)

Technical

- Jack Tatum – production
- Robin Schmidt – mastering
- Jorge Elbrecht – mixing (track 1)
- Geoff Swan – mixing (tracks 2–11)
- Adrian Olsen – engineering
- Drew Carroll – engineering (track 2)
