= Beach Fossils =

American indie rock band

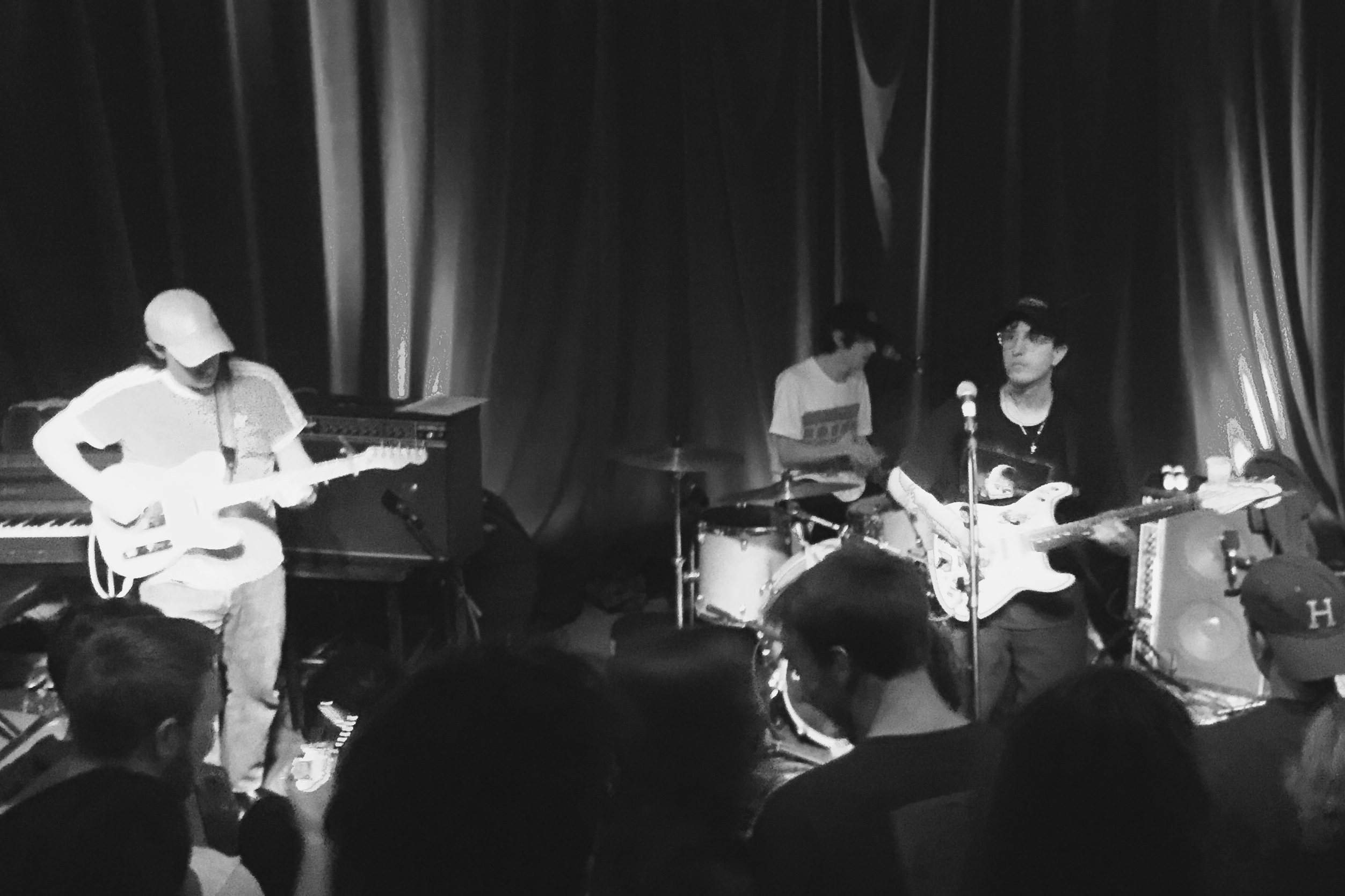
- Beach Fossils performing at The Columbus Theatre in Providence, Rhode Island (2019)

Background information
- Origin: New York City, U.S.
- Genres: Indie rock; dream pop; indie pop; alternative rock; jangle pop; garage pop; lo-fi
- Years active: 2009–present
- Labels: Captured Tracks, Bayonet Records
- Members: Dustin Payseur; Jack Doyle Smith; Tommy Davidson; Anton Hochheim
- Past members: Tommy Gardner; Christopher Sennott Burke; John Peña; Daniel Fox; Zachary Cole Smith; Tommy Lucas
- Website: beachfossils.com

Beach Fossils is an American indie rock band from Brooklyn, New York, formed in 2009. They are currently signed to Bayonet Records, having previously been signed to indie label Captured Tracks. The group's live band currently includes founder Dustin Payseur (vocals, guitar), Jack Doyle Smith (bass), Tommy Davidson (guitar), and Anton Hochheim (drums). They are known for their lo-fi, atmospheric sound, confessional and nostalgic lyrics, and Payseur's laid-back vocal style.

Payseur originally conceived the project in late 2008 when he moved to New York City after leaving school in his home state of North Carolina. To date they have released four studio albums, including their eponymous debut album (2010), Clash the Truth (2013), Somersault (2017), and Bunny (2023), as well as one EP titled What A Pleasure (2011). Beach Fossils, along with fellow Captured Tracks label mates DIIV, Wild Nothing, and Mac DeMarco, are considered forerunners in the lo-fi dream pop sound that grew out of the underground indie scene in the 2010s.

== History ==
=== 2009–2011: Formation, Beach Fossils, What A Pleasure EP ===
After a brief stint at community college in his home state of North Carolina, frontman Dustin Payseur moved to New York City in 2008 to pursue his interests in music. Known for his lo-fi vocals and reverberating indie rock, musician Payseur formed Beach Fossils in 2009 as a vehicle of expansion for a solo project. That same year, bassist John Peña and guitarist Christopher Burke were recruited, followed by Zachary Cole Smith on drums. After signing to Captured Tracks and quickly pulling together a live band, they took off playing countless shows across the U.S. gathering a slew of devoted fans in their wake. Their debut single, Daydream/Desert Sand was released in January 2010 through Captured Tracks. In May 2010, their self-titled debut Beach Fossils album was released, and met with favorable reviews.

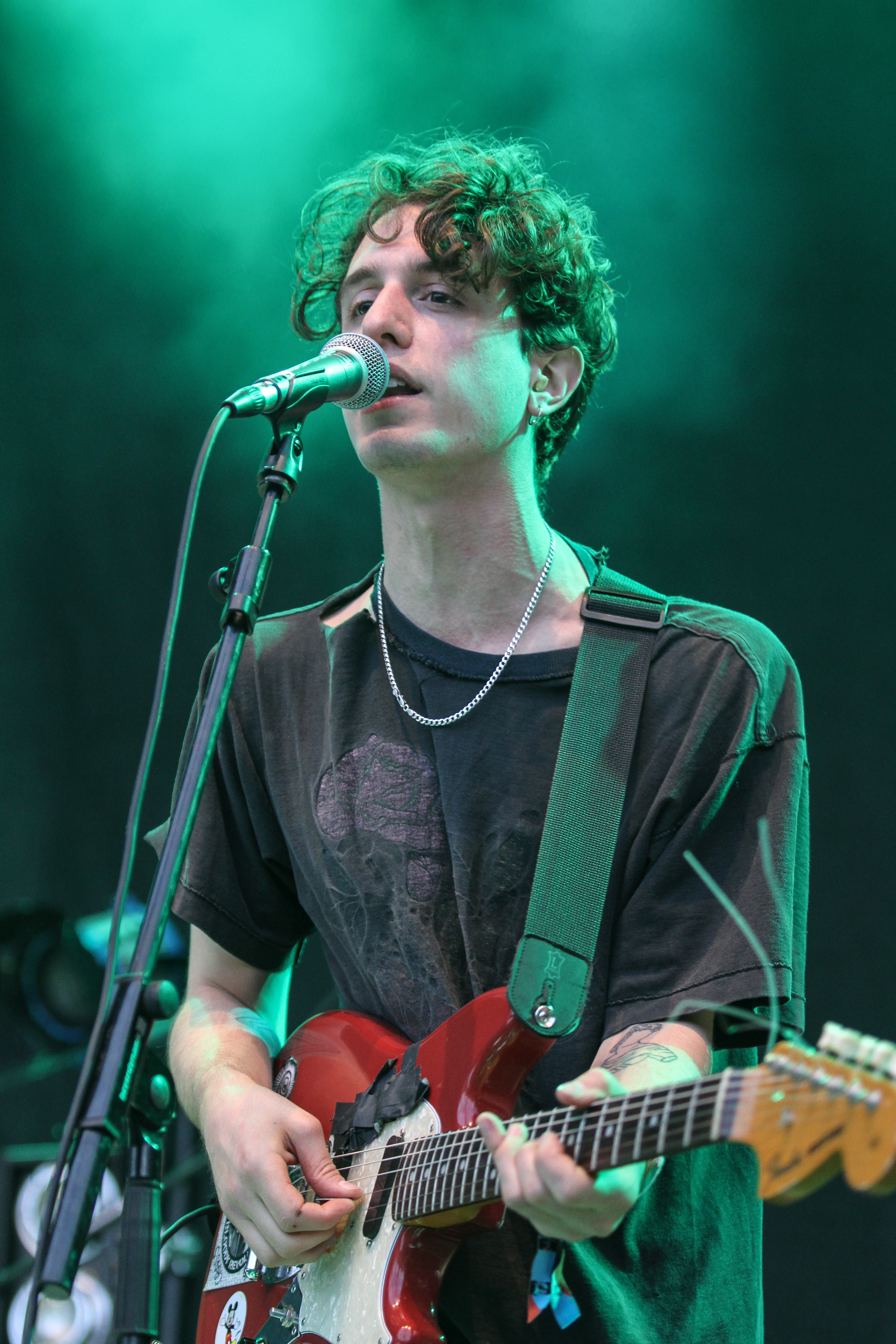
Beach Fossils was created by lead vocalist, guitarist, and principal songwriter Dustin Payseur in 2009

In a retrospective interview in 2014, Payseur commented on their first album saying, "The writing process is at its strongest when you don't even feel like you're writing the songs yourself... That happened when I was writing the first Beach Fossils record. I'd come back a day or two [after writing] and it would sound like I was listening to somebody else's music."

While their debut album was written and recorded almost entirely by Payseur, in between tours he decided to expand on his solo work for his follow up project. The band's second release, an EP titled What A Pleasure, was released on March 8, 2011. Born out of late night jams between Payseur, John Peña, and long time friend and collaborator Jack Tatum of Wild Nothing, What a Pleasure expanded on Beach Fossils' sonic landscape and resulted in some of Payseur's most memorable tracks. The EP has gradually become a cult classic among fans of the band, and many of its songs still work their way into Beach Fossils' live sets today.

During the recording sessions for What A Pleasure, Beach Fossils and Jack Tatum covered and recorded some their favorite songs from influential UK band The Wake. On April 4, 2011, Beach Fossils released a split tribute EP with Wild Nothing called Gruesome Flowers: A Tribute To The Wake through Captured Tracks. The band covered The Wake's "Plastic Flowers" and Wild Nothing covered the track "Gruesome Castle".

As the heavy touring schedule progressed, the band became scattered with many line-up changes, including twelve different drummers and three guitarists. In 2010 Christopher Burke left the band to pursue his solo project Red Romans, followed by John Peña in late 2011, who was replaced by Jack Doyle Smith. Peña formed Heavenly Beat, and Zachary Cole Smith, who was at this point playing guitar for Beach Fossils, left to form his own band DIIV. Tommy Lucas would eventually part ways with the band as well in 2011, resulting in Tommy Gardner stepping in as the drummer and Tommy Davidson joined on guitar to complete their lineup.

=== 2012–2014: Clash The Truth ===
On February 14, 2012, Beach Fossils released a single produced by Ben Greenberg titled "Shallow", which would eventually be rerecorded and appear on their upcoming album Clash the Truth. The single also featured a B-side titled "Lessons", written and recorded by Payseur and Tommy Gardner.

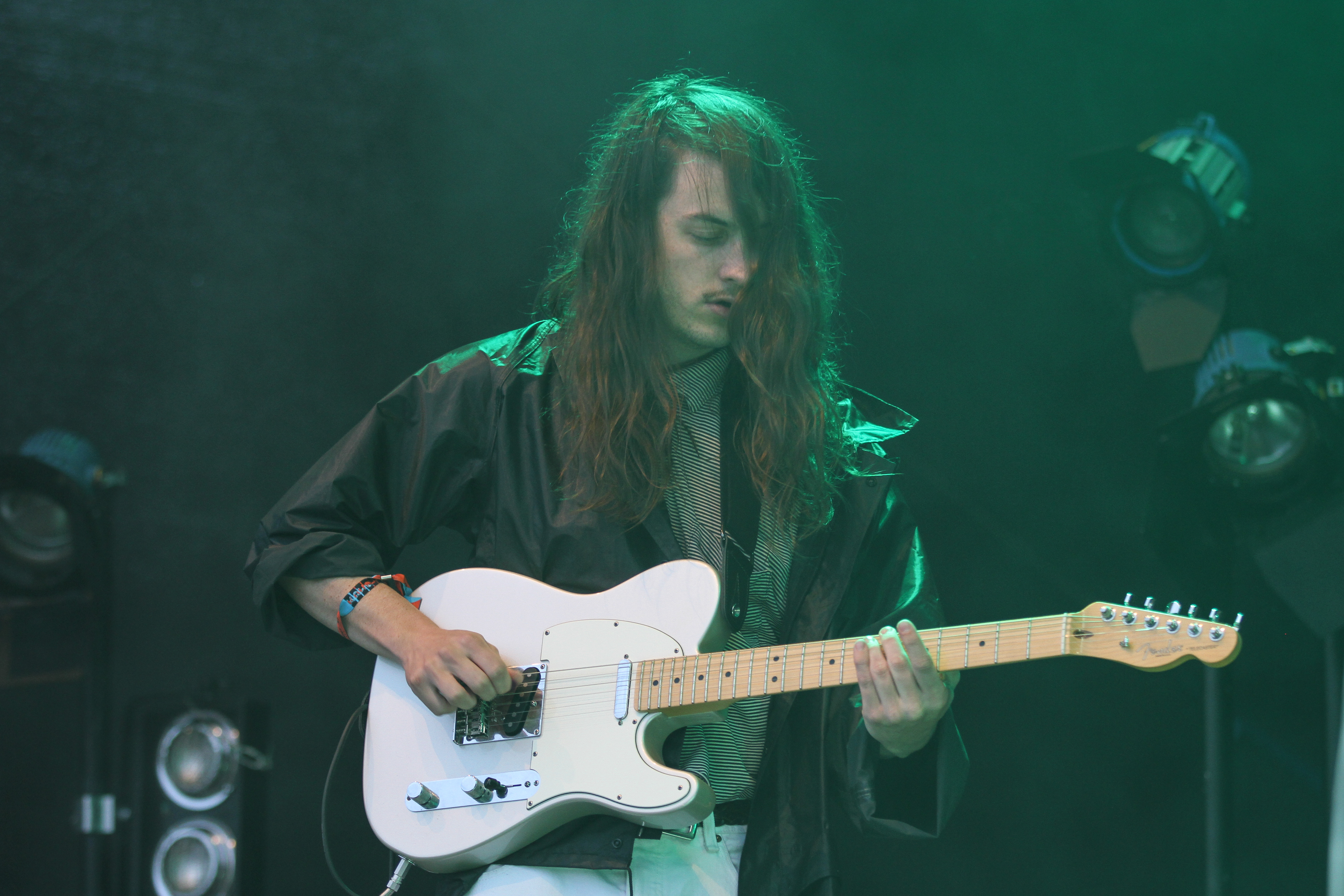
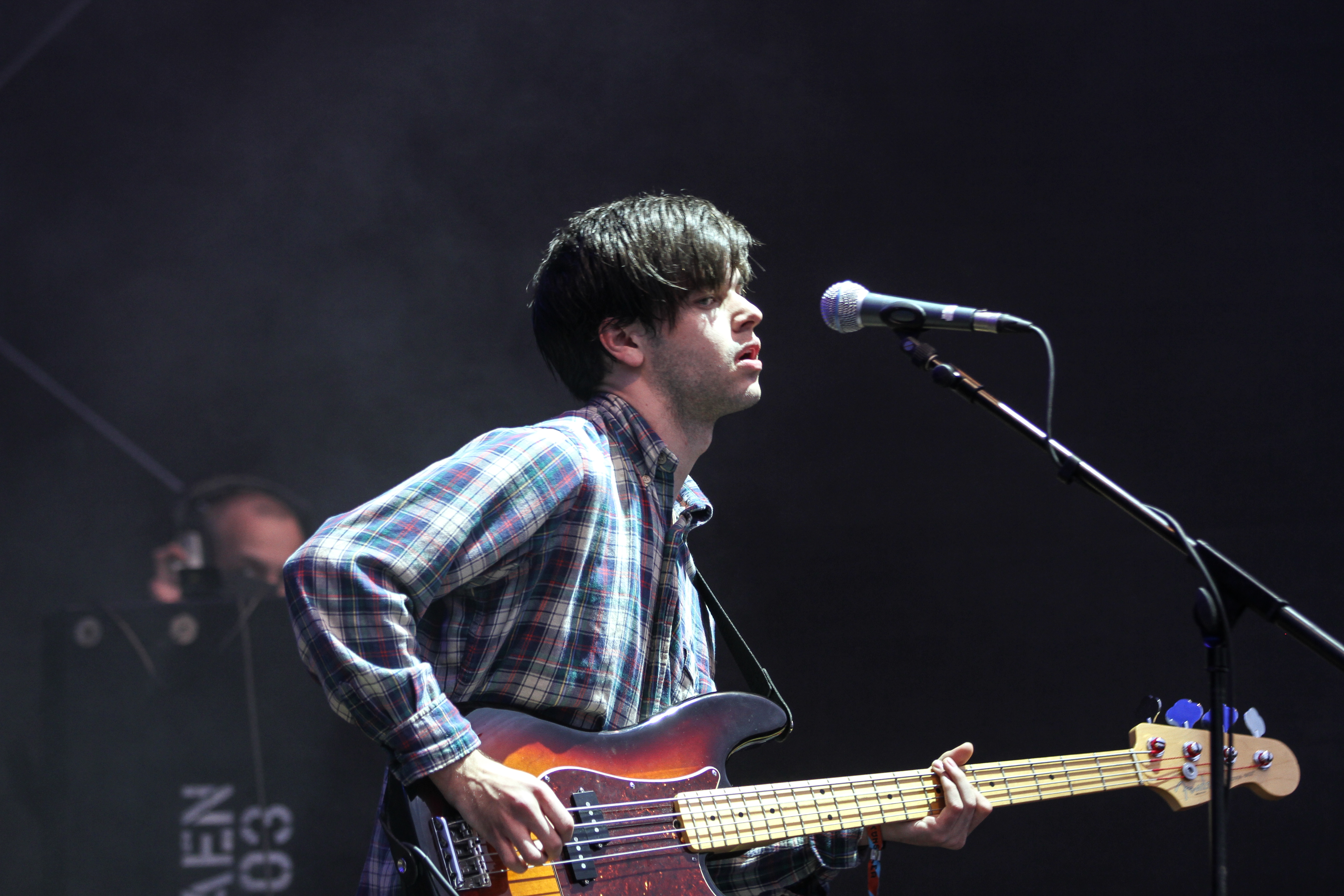
Guitarist Tommy Davidson (top) and bassist Jack Doyle Smith.

On February 19, 2013, Beach Fossils released their second studio album Clash the Truth through Captured Tracks, peaking at number 40 on the Independent Albums chart. It was their first full-length album produced by Ben Greenberg (formerly of The Men) and songwriter Payseur.

Clash the Truth finished recording at the Excello Recording studio in the fall of 2012 after recording was interrupted when Payseur's studio was flooded during Hurricane Sandy. Much like their earlier releases, the songs on the album were written almost entirely by Peyseur, who was also responsible for recording the majority of the instruments as well. The album featured new drummer Tommy Gardner, who allowed for a faster and more dynamic sound than in previous releases. It also features collaborations with Kazu Makino of Blonde Redhead and Jack Tatum of Wild Nothing.

The album received generally positive reviews from critics, some noting the more focused themes of adolescence and nostalgia as a sign of growth and maturity while continuing to refine their sound and style. Many of the tracks featured on Clash The Truth are live staples for the band. Songs such as "Careless", "Sleep Apnea", "Generational Synthetic", and the opening title track have consistently appeared on the live setlist since the album's release.

=== 2015–2016: Bayonet Records ===
In 2015 Payseur and his wife Katie Garcia founded their own independent label Bayonet Records after cutting their teeth at fellow Brooklyn imprint Captured Tracks. Katie is former label manager of Captured Tracks and current A&R for Secretly Group. In an interview with Forbes in June 2017, when asked how she and Payseur met and eventually started their own label, "Dustin and I met when I was interning at Captured Tracks. He was coming to pick up his very first seven-inch, and then we ended up going on our first date a couple days later. Fast forward four years and we got married. All these things started to line up, pointing to us starting our own label. He asked me to be a part of it because I know the ins and outs of how to work a label. That's how we started Bayonet."

Payseur had also spent much of his time in the Captured Tracks main office early on in Beach Fossils' career. In an interview with Tidal in May 2017, Payseur was asked how he got into the music industry and what motivated him to begin his own label. He explained, "I was always in the office. I didn't know anything about how record labels were run at all. Early on, Mike Sniper was showing me stuff. He took me under his wing in a way. But the thing for me is not thinking of it as a music industry or a music business; I feel like those words have certain connotations that really turn me off from the whole thing." Mike Sniper is the much-respected owner and founder of Captured Tracks. He also went on to mention influential record labels Stones Throw and Rough Trade as inspiration for how he runs and operates Bayonet, "I was always really inspired by Stones Throw and early Rough Trade. Just the way they were run. It just felt like more of a close-knit community or artist collective rather than this faceless, anonymous brand. It wasn't even about a brand. It was just about getting people together and making shit happen."

The couple have frequently stated that they wanted to make sure their "indie rock" label signed artists of all styles, not restricted by perceived genre. Payseur says he was drawn to the artists he's signed simply because they've moved him with their music. Since its inception, Bayonet has made a name for itself signing and releasing records from the likes of Beach Fossils, Frankie Cosmos, Jerry Paper, Kevin Krauter, Laced, Lionlimb, Red Sea, and Warehouse.

=== 2016–2018: Somersault ===
After touring in support of their second album Clash the Truth the band took a break. During this time they appeared in several episodes of the HBO show "Vinyl" as members of the early-1970s punk band "the Nasty Bits." The show was produced by HBO and was a fictional representation of the music industry in New York in the 1970s. The show featured a number of musicians who depicted real-life musicians; it was short lived and only aired from February 14 to April 17, 2016. Despite having no experience in acting, the members of the band were able to pull off an impressive performance.

The group would then begin working on a new album in early 2016. This time out, Payseur involved the other members of the band in the writing process, with both bassist Jack Doyle Smith and guitarist Tommy Davidson contributing ideas. A decision was also made to incorporate string arrangements at various points throughout the album, giving it a more grand and eclectic sound as compared to the more conventional four-piece band approach on earlier releases. Augmented with more complex instrumentation, including piano, harpsichord, flute, and sax, the new songs offered multi-layered pop guided by sharp, poignant, and honest lyrics.

On March 2, 2017, the band announced that their upcoming third LP, titled "Somersault", would be released on June 2, 2017. The album was produced by frontman Payseur and Jonathan Rado of the indie rock band Foxygen. It is also the first album by the Beach Fossils released through Payseur's own label Bayonet Records. The first single from the album, titled "This Year", debuted alongside the album announcement. Rachel Goswell from Slowdive and Cities Aviv were also announced to have guest appearances on the new album. It was recorded in various locations in Brooklyn, Manhattan and Los Angeles, including engineer Jonathan Rado's home studio and a cabin in upstate New York.

On March 13, 2017, the band revealed the departure of drummer Tommy Gardner, who moved to Shanghai to pursue his interests in becoming a Buddhist monk. In an interview with Adam Budofsky for Modern Drummer, Payseur said of Gardner's departure, "Tommy was talking about becoming a Buddhist monk and he went on this meditation retreat, so we weren't sure what the future of him playing with us was going to be. And he wasn't really involved in the writing process [on Somersault]; the way the three of us wrote before is we'd spend like three hours writing one riff, and I know that if a drummer's in the room, that's painful." Gardner had been a part of Beach Fossils since 2011.

In April 2017, the band wrote a non-album single titled "Silver Tongue" for the Our First 100 Days compilation. All profits raised went directly to organizations working to spread awareness about climate change, women's rights, immigration, LGBTQ rights and equality.

Somersault was released on June 2, 2017, and received widespread critical acclaim upon release, with many critics complimenting its brighter tone, layered arrangements, and the more collaborative approach to songwriting within the band. One month after the album's release, Beach Fossils embarked on a lengthy world tour that took up the latter half of 2017. During much of the summer they would go on to tour throughout the US and Europe, and would eventually announce US dates in the fall along with supporting acts Snail Mail and raener.

=== 2018–2020: Tour with Wavves, festival performances ===
On February 7, 2018, to celebrate his birthday, Payseur released a cover of Yung Lean's "Agony," and shot an impromptu video the same day while "walking around in a haze," as he phrases on Twitter.

In 2018, Beach Fossils announced they would be going on tour with Wavves on the "I Love You Tour" across North America. They also released a split 7-inch with Wavves, simply titled "Wavves X Beach Fossils". The split features "Enter Still", a brand new, previously unheard demo track from Wavves on side A, and the Beach Fossils single "Silver Tongue" on side B.

Beach Fossils performed at the Coachella music festival in April 2019. They would also perform at the second annual Posty Fest at AT&T Stadium in November, a music festival hosted by hip hop artist and close friend of the band's Post Malone. Beach Fossils performed with other artists such as Pharrell Williams, Meek Mill, Rae Sremmurd, Jaden Smith, Doja Cat, as well as Post Malone himself. The following week Beach Fossils would go on to perform in the Tropicalia Festival 2019 on November 9, 2019, in Pomona, CA.

On January 7, 2020, Beach Fossils lead vocalist Dustin Payseur announced via Twitter that Beach Fossils and Wild Nothing will embark on their first co-headlining tour in the spring of 2020. The pair of indie rock bands are touring together to celebrate the 10-year anniversary (in May) since the release of their debut albums, Beach Fossils, and Gemini, respectively. Payseur posted a photo of himself and Wild Nothing frontman Jack Tatum on Twitter, who he called "one of my best friends" in a "sentimental" note that came with the tour announcement. He acknowledged that both of their debut albums "were released into the world" on the same day almost 10 years ago (May 25, 2010). He also explained that even though they wrote music together and "shared many good times," for some reason, they never toured together.

=== 2020–2021: Tour with Wild Nothing, The Other Side of Life: Piano Ballads ===
After the announcement of their upcoming 10th anniversary tour, on April 3, 2020, both Beach Fossils and Wild Nothing posted on their Instagram accounts that their tour would be rescheduled to the fall of 2021 due to the COVID-19 pandemic.

On May 18, 2021, Beach Fossils announced via Instagram that they will be performing a livestream show of the band playing both Beach Fossils and What A Pleasure EP in their entirety. The livestream will be held on June 10, 2021, and coincides with the 11th anniversary of their debut album as well as the 10th anniversary of What A Pleasure. It was also announced that the previously rescheduled co-headline tour with Wild Nothing will still be happening in October and November 2021.

On May 25, 2021, Beach Fossils announced a 10th anniversary edition of their self-titled debut. The reissue of Beach Fossils arrives with a limited edition 7-inch of "Vacation" with the previously unreleased song "Time."

After three years without any official Beach Fossils release, on June 11, 2021, Dustin released a cover of the Kelly Lee Owens song "L.I.N.E.". The single is part of Secretly Canadian's SC25 compilation, with 100% of the album's proceeds being donated to New Hope For Families in a mission to aid every homeless family in Bloomington, Indiana.

On September 21, 2021, Dustin posted a teaser for new music on the official Beach Fossils Instagram account with the caption "tomorrow / 10am EST / NEW MUSIC... I'll be in the chat". The following morning the band released a jazz-influenced piano version of their 2017 song "This Year". The single coincided with the announcement of an upcoming piano ballads album of previously released Beach Fossils songs titled The Other Side of Life: Piano Ballads set to be released November 19, 2021 on Bayonet. The title is from a lyric in the song "This Year" from their 2017 album Somersault. Featured on the album is former Beach Fossils drummer Tommy Gardner. Payseur worked on the jazz arrangements with Gardner, a Juilliard graduate who played drums in Beach Fossils from 2011 to 2016 before moving to China. Gardner played piano, sax, and bass on The Other Side Of Life, while Henry Kwapis handled the drums, with all of the recording done remotely. Regarding the recording process Payseur said, "As for my vocals, I'm not a jazz singer and I had no intention of altering my style for this record," Payseur explained in a press release. "The idea was for my vocals to be the common thread between the original versions and these new versions."

He would go on to describe how the project came to fruition; "I was astounded by the amount of musical talent that [Tommy Gardner] possessed. On tour, whenever we were in a green room with a piano, Tommy would sit down and start improvising Beach Fossils songs in a jazzy style. He would be playing the melodies for the guitars, bass and vocals all together. It's not like he rehearsed it, it would be the first time he'd ever attempted to play these songs, and it was always beautiful. For years I had the idea of turning these piano versions of Beach Fossils songs into an album, and in 2020 when touring came to a sudden halt due to Covid, I reached out to Gardner and asked if he wanted to finally make this album."

=== 2022–present: Bunny ===
Starting in spring of 2022, Beach Fossils would embark on a series of small tours as well as performing at several music festivals around North America. In March the band announced their appearance at the upcoming Viva! L.A. Music Festival at Dodgers Stadium scheduled for that June. It was later announced that the festival was cancelled. They would also play several dates in Mexico throughout June 2022, including an appearance at the Sueño de Verano in Guadalajara, Mexico. They would then tour throughout October and November around California, New York, and Texas.

In January 2023, Beach Fossils announced they would perform at Daydream festival in Australia, a new touring mini-festival along with Modest Mouse, Slowdive, and Tropical Fuck Storm.

A brand new song was previewed on the official Beach Fossils Instagram on February 28, 2023, along with a video of the band playing with a small bunny figurine. It was later announced that their first original song in five years, titled "Don't Fade Away", would be released on all platforms March 7, 2023, along with an accompanying music video. Their fourth studio album Bunny was released on June 2, 2023, through Bayonet Records.

From July 8 to August 19, 2023, they were the opening act for Post Malone on his 'If Y'all Weren't Here, I'd Be Crying' Tour in the US and Canada.

== Style and influence ==
Their musical style has been described as indie rock, dream pop, indie pop, alternative rock, jangle pop, garage pop, and lo-fi.

In an interview with Kyra Bruce for KOSU in April 2019, Payseur reflected on his lyrical themes and direction over the years, "I was writing these really happy pop songs [early in my career] and then after a while I was like, 'You know I don't feel great all the time and I want to write about that, I want to be able to write about how I'm feeling when I don't feel good.' And those somehow happened to be our biggest songs and the ones that people liked the most. I was like, 'This is great I don't have to write these like shiny pop songs, I can write stuff that's about real life and about being sad and people are super into it.'"

In an interview with The Post and Courier in January 2020, Dustin Payseur stated he has "hundreds" of unreleased demos that he's been working on since he was a teenager. Some, he says, are entirely cringe-inducing. But he'll listen to some of his early demos and tapes when he's stumped in the recording studio and will often recycle old guitar riffs or lyrical ideas. He would also explain, "If you don't allow yourself to get to the point where you're vulnerable enough to look back and see that what you've made is cringe-y, you haven't tried hard enough. Otherwise, you're censoring yourself too much."

== Band members ==
Current members

- Dustin Payseur – lead vocals, guitar, bass (2009–present)
- Tommy Davidson – guitar, bass, (2012–present)
- Jack Doyle Smith – bass, guitar, backing vocals (2012–present)
- Anton Hochheim – drums, backing vocals (2017–present)

Former members

- John Peña – bass (2009–2012)
- Christopher Sennott Burke – guitars (2009–2011)
- Tommy Lucas – drums (2009–2010)
- Daniel Fox – keyboards, trumpet, guitar, samples, backing vocals (2017)
- Zachary Cole Smith – drums (2010); guitar (2011–2012)
- Tommy Gardner – drums (2010–2017)

== Discography ==
=== Studio albums ===
- Beach Fossils (2010)
- Clash the Truth (2013)
- Somersault (2017)
- Bunny (Bayonet Records – BR-055, 2023)

=== Compilation albums ===
- The Other Side of Life: Piano Ballads (2021)

=== EPs ===
- What a Pleasure (Captured Tracks – CT-095, 2011)

Singles

- "Daydream" (2010)
- "Face It" (2010)
- Gruesome Flowers: A Tribute to the Wake (Captured Tracks – CT105, 2011) – split 7" of the Wake covers with Wild Nothing; contributed "Plastic Flowers"
- "Shallow" (2012)
- "Careless" (2013)
- "This Year" (2017)
- "Saint Ivy" (2017)
- "Down the Line" (2017)
- "Tangerine" / "Social Jetlag" (2017)
- "Silver Tongue" (2018) – split 7" featuring "Enter Still" by Wavves
- "Vacation / "Time" (Beach Fossils 10th anniversary reissue, 2020)
- "Don't Fade Away" (2023)
- Inside Out / Cooking" (The Numero Group – 734, August 22, 2025) – split 7" of Duster covers with Current Joys
