= Clash the Truth =

Studio album by Beach Fossils
- Released: February 19, 2013
- Recorded: 2012
- Studio: Excello Recording (Brooklyn, New York)
- Genres: Indie pop; college rock; post-punk; garage rock
- Length: 35:21
- Label: Captured Tracks
- Producers: Ben Greenberg; Dustin Payseur

Beach Fossils chronology
What a Pleasure (2011)	Clash the Truth (2013)	Somersault (2017)

Singles from Clash the Truth
- 1. "Shallow / Lessons" Released: February 14, 2012; 2. "Careless" Released: December 4, 2012

Clash the Truth is the second studio album by American indie rock band Beach Fossils. The album was produced by Ben Greenberg (formerly of The Men) as well as band frontman and primary songwriter Dustin Payseur. It was released on February 19, 2013, through Captured Tracks.

== Recording ==
Dustin Payseur wrote and recorded a demo of the entire album in his apartment in New York before recording it professionally in a studio. The recording of Clash the Truth was finished at the Excello Recording studio in the fall of 2012. Recording was briefly interrupted when Payseur's studio was flooded during Hurricane Sandy.

Clash the Truth featured new drummer Tommy Gardner, who allowed for a faster, more energetic sound than in previous releases. It also features collaborations with Kazu Makino of Blonde Redhead and Jack Tatum of Wild Nothing.

== Cover artwork ==
The artwork used for Clash the Truth, designed by Captured Tracks founder Mike Sniper and Dustin Payseur, features black and white stills taken from the experimental video Three Transitions (1973) directed by Peter Campus.

== Reception ==
Clash the Truth received mostly positive reviews from critics, some noting the more focused themes of adolescence and nostalgia as a sign of growth and maturity while continuing to refine their sound and style.

Professional ratings
Aggregate scores
Source	Rating
Metacritic	68/100
Review scores
Source	Rating
AllMusic	4/5 stars
Consequence	C+
Drowned in Sound	8/10
Paste	7.4/10
Pitchfork	5.8/10
Sputnikmusic	3.7/5

In a lukewarm review for Pitchfork, Ian Cohen wrote that "The New York City dream pop band's second album sees them introduce a darker, more socially aware edge, though it trades their former instrumental rigidity for amiable, mid-fi college rock jangle." Writing for Consequence, reviewer Paula Mejia rated the album a C+, stating that "Beach Fossils’ Dustin Payseur strays from the syrupy reverb typically dominating Beach Fossils’ breezy aesthetic, trading it in for torrential guitars and thrashing drums on his band's restless sophomore release." She continued with "With Clash the Truth, Beach Fossils are driving away from the blinding sunlight and toward a shadowed elsewhere. What matters is that their eyes are trained forward."

In a similar review, The Quietus writer Ryan Foley commented on their production and songwriting by writing "Clash The Truth follows that 'Beach Fossils' template to a tee. What separates the album from previous releases is its robust sound." while also commending this approach by writing "It's like Payseur went from doodling on Post-it notes to emblazoning missiles across the sky... In 'Careless' and 'Crashed Out', nervy, guitar jangle and punchy percussion come together in breakneck instrumental outros unlike anything Payseur has recorded previously. The songs do more than simply breathe new life into guitar pop – they snatch its breath away."

== Track listing ==
All tracks are written by Dustin Payseur, except where noted.

No.	Title	Writer(s)	Length
1.	"Clash the Truth"		2:03
2.	"Generational Synthetic"		2:44
3.	"Sleep Apnea"		2:26
4.	"Careless"	Tommy Gardner, Payseur	3:03
5.	"Modern Holiday"		1:21
6.	"Taking Off"		3:09
7.	"Shallow"	Payseur, Jack Tatum	3:17
8.	"Burn You Down"	Gardner, Payseur	2:57
9.	"Birthday"		2:52
10.	"In Vertigo" (featuring Kazu Makino)		3:20
11.	"Brighter"		0:33
12.	"Caustic Cross"		2:41
13.	"Ascension"		1:30
14.	"Crashed Out"		3:25

== Personnel ==
- Dustin Payseur - vocals, guitar, bass, production, art direction
- Tommy Gardner - drums, additional guitar and Wurlitzer on "Sleep Apnea"
- Ben Greenberg - production, mixing, additional guitar on "Ascension"
- Kazu Makino - additional vocals on "In Vertigo"
- Katie Garcia - additional vocals on "Caustic Cross"
- Joe Lambert - mastering
- Peter Campus - artwork images
- Mike Sniper - art direction
- Ryan McCardle - design and layout
