= Eternal Family (streaming service) =

Independent video streaming service founded in 2020

- Industry: Streaming media
- Founded: 2020
- Founder: Cole Kush
- Products: Video streaming service
- Website: eternal.tv

Eternal Family is an independent video-on-demand streaming service founded by Canadian animator and filmmaker Cole Kush in 2020. Originally established as an artist-run membership platform for experimental video, original programming and independent creators, the service later developed a focus on curating unusual, obscure and hard-to-find films.

== History ==
Eternal Family was launched in March 2020 by Cole Kush, a Canadian animator and filmmaker known for his work in music videos and animation. Kush developed the platform as an alternative outlet for creative work that might not find a home through conventional entertainment networks. In an interview with The FADER, he described the project as an opportunity for independent artists to experiment with video and develop programming outside traditional distribution structures.

The service launched with original programmes featuring musicians and other independent creators. Its initial programming included Advanced Studio Recording Techniques, a series hosted by musician Mac DeMarco, and instructional content featuring Jerry Paper.

In its initial membership model, subscriptions cost US$5 per month or US$50 annually. Kush described a revenue-sharing arrangement in which 60 percent of monthly revenue was distributed among contributing creators, with the remainder allocated to operating costs and the development and licensing of additional programming.

== Programming and development ==
At launch, Eternal Family's catalogue included original comedy, documentaries, instructional programmes, animation and experimental video. The platform also featured a collection of public-domain works and a stock-footage library.

In a 2022 profile of Kush, It's Nice That described Eternal Family as an artist-run streaming service and entertainment network intended to provide a platform for experimental ideas and curated material. Kush discussed the development of original programmes, including The Family, an animated sitcom created with collaborator Dan Streit.

By 2024, the service was also developing its catalogue of older and less widely distributed films. In an interview with PEDESTRIAN.TV, collaborator Drew Marshall described plans to expand its programming to include films and other material from the 1970s, 1980s and 1990s, particularly obscure works and overlooked releases.

In August 2024, Dread Central profiled the service as a destination for surreal, rare and lost media. The publication described a catalogue containing feature films, shows, compilations and short films, with material spanning horror, thriller and other unconventional categories.

== Reception ==
In a 2025 article for How-To Geek, Mark McPherson gave the service a positive assessment, describing it as a discovery of considerable appeal. He wrote that he had "struck gold" and singled out its unusual film selections, including several titles he particularly enjoyed.

Writing for Dread Central in August 2024, Chad Collins described the service enthusiastically, calling it potentially "the coolest thing you see on the internet today". He expressed particular excitement about its selection of unusual films and recommended that readers explore the platform.

In October 2026, It's Nice That published a feature written by Paul Moore in collaboration with the Eternal Family collective. The article described the service as an "off-beat movie streaming app" and presented its film selections favourably, highlighting the visual inventiveness and unconventional character of the works featured.
