= Dream, Ivory =

American musical duo

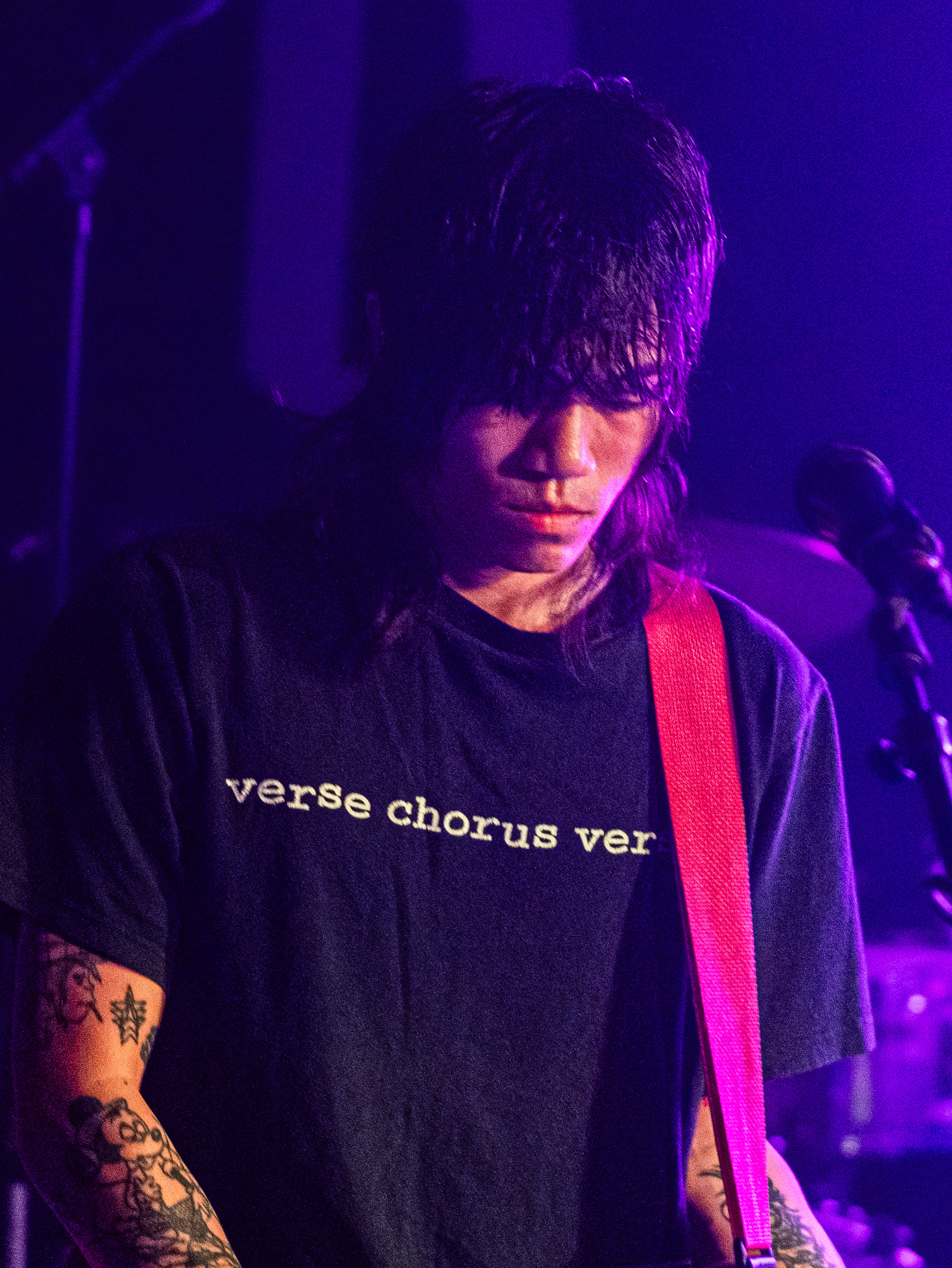
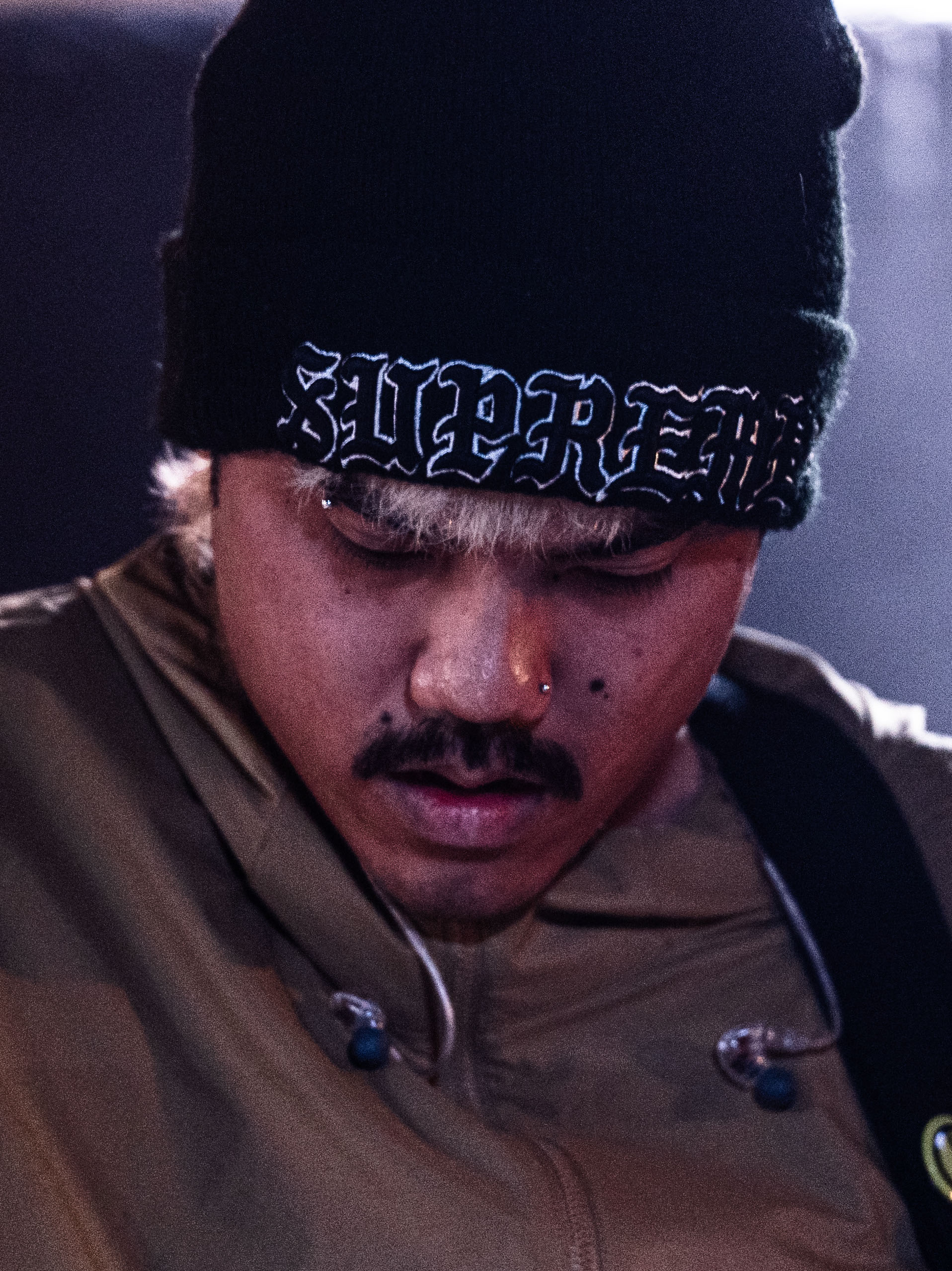
- Christian Baello and Louie Baello

Background information
- Origin: Lake Elsinore, California
- Genres: Dream pop; bedroom pop; shoegaze; lo-fi; indie rock
- Years active: 2016–present
- Members: Christian Baello; Louie Baello

Dream, Ivory is an American-Filipino dream pop duo that consists of brothers Christian (guitars, percussion) and Louie Baello.

They released their debut self-titled EP in 2016. The following year, they released several singles including "welcome and goodbye", one of their most commercially successful songs. In 2022, they released their first full-length album, which contains more pop rock elements than their previous releases.

Their influences include Beach House, Beach Fossils and Slowdive.

Christian also has hip-hop projects under the names Ginseng and Lil Wintr.

== Discography ==
=== Albums ===
- About a Boy (2022)
- When You Come Back I Have So Much To Tell You (2025)

=== EPs ===
- Dream, Ivory (2017)
- Flowerhill Drive (2018)

=== Singles ===
- "Scorpion" (2019)
- "Wedding Crasher" (2019)
- "Making Faces" (2019)
- "Acid" (2020)
- "Melatonin Nightmarezzz" (2020)
- "Amateur Night" (2020)
- "Milk" (2023)
