= What a Pleasure (EP) =

What A Pleasure

EP by Beach Fossils
- Released: March 8, 2011
- Recorded: 2011
- Studio: Bonati Mastering, NYC.
- Genre: Indie rock; dream pop; lo-fi
- Length: 23:07
- Label: Captured Tracks (CT-095)
- Producer: Dustin Payseur; Josh Bonati

Beach Fossils chronology
Beach Fossils (2010)	What A Pleasure (2011)	Clash The Truth (2013)

What a Pleasure is the first EP from American indie rock band Beach Fossils released on March 8, 2011, through Captured Tracks. The EP was produced by lead vocalist and primary songwriter Dustin Payseur.

== Background and recording ==
Following the release of their eponymous debut album in 2010 to critical acclaim, Beach Fossils continued to tour extensively. While on tour the band would frequently play extremely high-energy and fast performances. This eventually proved to be physically exhausting, so their forthcoming project would contain much slower tempos.

All of the songs on What A Pleasure were written and composed by Dustin Payseur, with contributions from bassist John Peña, as well as Jack Tatum of the band Wild Nothing.

On May 18, 2021 Beach Fossils announced via Instagram that they will be performing a livestream show of the band playing both Beach Fossils and What A Pleasure EP in their entirety. The livestream will be held on June 10, 2021, and coincides with the 11th anniversary of their debut album as well as the 10th anniversary of What A Pleasure.

== Reception ==
Professional ratings
Aggregate scores
Source	Rating
Metacritic	66/100
Review scores
Source	Rating
AllMusic	3.5/5 stars
PopMatters	6/10
Pitchfork	7.2/10
Consequence of Sound	C−
The Boston Phoenix	6.3/10

What a Pleasure received mixed to positive reviews from critics. Many noted the clear and brighter production as an improvement from their debut album's lo-fi, fuzzy sound.

In a positive review, Martin Douglas of Pitchfork noted the contributions from bass player John Peña are evident in the songwriting, comparing it to their eponymous debut album which was written entirely by Dustin Paysuer. Douglas wrote "The tunes on What a Pleasure sound like scaled-back variations of themes explored to their fullest potential on the band's debut, which is odd considering how much more collaborative this record is[...] Here, Payseur wrote the songs along with bassist John Peña, and it shows. On certain songs, the bassline provides much of the instrumental melody during the verses, which spreads things out a little, but oses some of Payseur's compositional flair in the process." He concluded his review of the album with "It'll be interesting to see where Beach Fossils go from here, because What a Pleasure is the type of release that shows they're talented, but still have a little work to do fully capitalize on it."

In a mixed review, The Boston Phoenix wrote "This Pleasure is known, but in the end it overstays its welcome." AllMusic was more positive, saying of the EP "This collection is a solid batch of homemade melancholy pop, built around Dustin Payseur's mopey vocals, jangling guitars, and athletic basslines, with the occasional surprise like the synth pop gem "Out in the Way." It's sure to sound good to anyone who liked Beach Fossils (2010) and wanted more songs in that vein."

== Track listing ==
All tracks are written by Dustin Payseur, except where noted

No.	Title	Writer(s)	Length
1.	"Moments"	Dustin Payseur	1:05
2.	"What A Pleasure"	Payseur, John Peña	2:33
3.	"Fall Right In"	Payseur	2:33
4.	"Out In The Way" (featuring Wild Nothing)	Payseur, Jack Tatum	3:52
5.	"Face It"	Payseur, Peña	3:34
6.	"Distance"	Payseur	2:21
7.	"Calyer"	Payseur, Peña, Christopher Sennott Burke	3:09
8.	"Adversity"	Payseur, Peña	4:03

- "Out In The Way" features Jack Tatum of Wild Nothing on vocals, synths, and songwriting.
- "Face It" features uncredited background vocals from Katie Garcia.

== Personnel ==
- Dustin Paysuer
- John Peña
- Tommy Gardner
- Christopher Sennott Burke
