= Bunny (Beach Fossils album) =

Studio album by Beach Fossils
- Released: June 2, 2023
- Genre: Indie pop, dream pop
- Length: 37:20
- Label: Bayonet

Beach Fossils chronology
The Other Side of Life: Piano Ballads (2021)	Bunny (2023)

Bunny is the fourth studio album by American indie rock band Beach Fossils, released on June 2, 2023.

== Background ==
In an Instagram post announcing Bunny's release date, Dustin Payseur wrote: "This is an album about missing friends, falling in love, embracing your mistakes, being depressed, having fun, absolute freedom, self-medicating, anger, longing, anxiety, self-discovery, being an idiot, hate, friendship, being lazy, being afraid, being naive, ignoring bullshit, trying new things, having regrets, being alive, feeling alone, loss of love, shedding the past, fucking up, healing and new beginnings. Bunny represents strength through vulnerability."

== Release and reception ==
Released on June 2, 2023, Bunny was Beach Fossils' first studio album since 2017's Somersault, and ranked 5th on PopMatters' "20 Best Pop Albums of 2023". Reviewing the album on its original release, PopMatters' John Bergstrom gave it a 7/10 rating, declaring it "a pure, seamless combination of [Somersault's] pristine production and newfound maturity with the post-punk-influenced, guitar-driven sound of Beach Fossils' earliest releases." Pitchfork gave the album a 7.6 out of 10.

== Track listing ==
Bunny track listing
No.	Title	Writer(s)	Length
1.	"Sleeping On My Own"	Dustin Payseur, Jack Smith, Thomas Davidson, Tommy Gardner	2:42
2.	"Run To The Moon"	Payseur, Smith, Davidson, Gardner	3:45
3.	"Don't Fade Away"	Payseur, Smith, Davidson, Gardner	3:22
4.	"(Just Like The) Setting Sun"	Payseur, Smith, Davidson, Gardner	3:47
5.	"Anything Is Anything"	Payseur, Smith, Davidson, Gardner	4:08
6.	"Dare Me"	Payseur, Smith, Davidson, Gardner	2:25
7.	"Feel So High"	Payseur, Smith, Davidson, Gardner	3:47
8.	"Tough Love"		2:26
9.	"Seconds"		3:07
10.	"Numb"		4:20
11.	"Waterfall"		3:31
Total length:			37:20
