= Somersault (Beach Fossils album) =

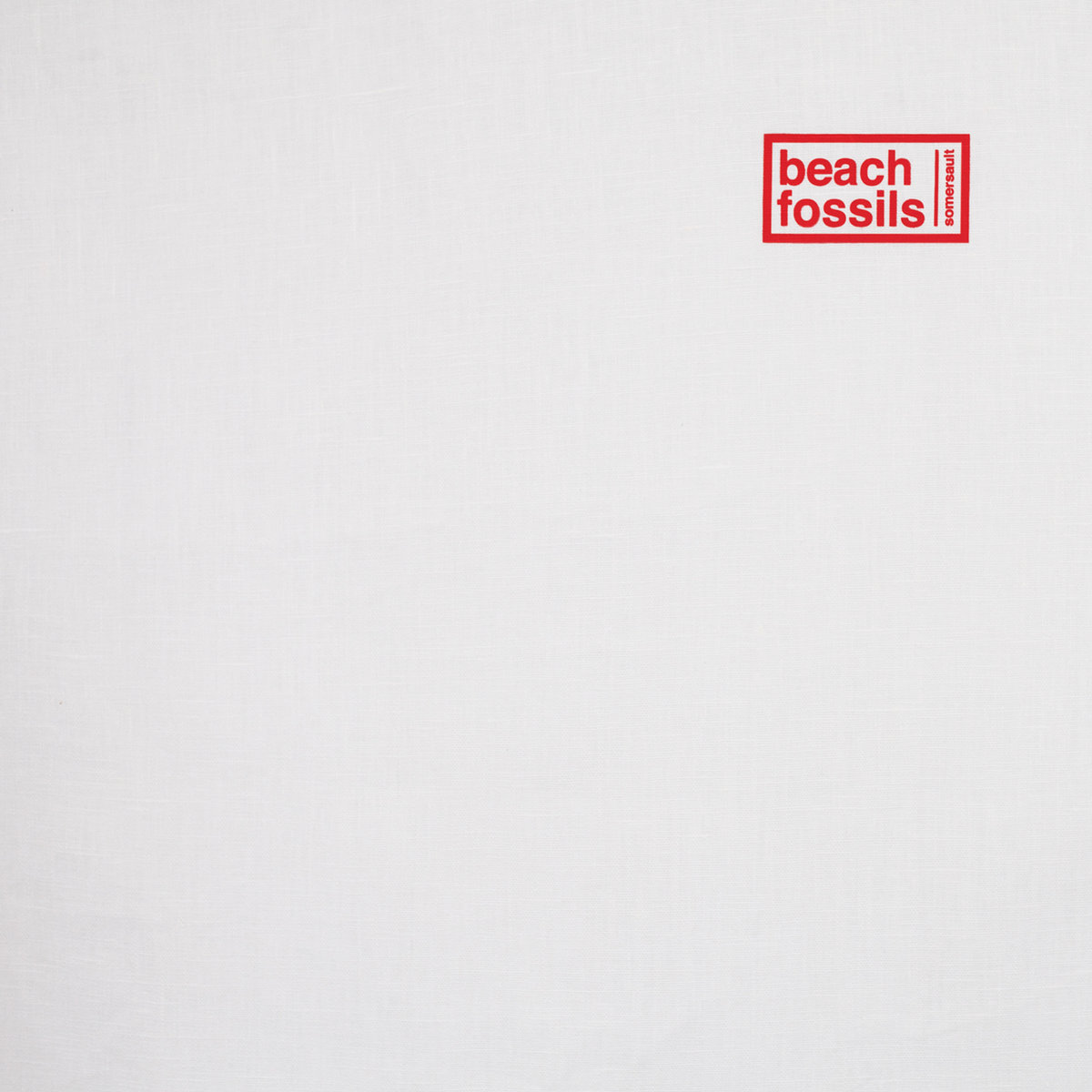

Studio album by Beach Fossils
- Released: June 2, 2017
- Recorded: 2016–2017
- Genres: Indie rock; dream pop; baroque pop
- Length: 34:56
- Label: Bayonet
- Producers: Dustin Payseur; Jonathan Rado

Beach Fossils chronology
Clash the Truth (2013)	Somersault (2017)	The Other Side of Life: Piano Ballads (2021)

Singles from Somersault
- 1. "This Year" Released: March 02, 2017; 2. "Saint Ivy" Released: April 05, 2017; 3. "Down The Line" Released: May 01, 2017; 4. "Tangerine / Social Jetlag" Released: May 17, 2017

Somersault is the third studio album by American indie rock band Beach Fossils, released on June 2, 2017, and produced by frontman Dustin Payseur and Jonathan Rado. It was the first Beach Fossils album released through Payseur's own label, Bayonet Records, which he started in 2015 with his wife and former label manager of Captured Tracks Katie Garcia. Somersault produced five singles that are considered to be among the band's best-known songs, which include "This Year", "Saint Ivy", "Down The Line", "Tangerine", and "Social Jetlag". The album marked a change in the band's style from the energetic jangle pop of previous records to a layered and more textured sound rooted in baroque pop and indie rock.

The band recorded in various locations in upstate New York, Brooklyn, Manhattan, and Los Angeles. The album received critical acclaim upon release, with many complimenting its bright tone, layered arrangements, and the more collaborative approach to songwriting within the band. The album's release also marked the longest gap between two Beach Fossils albums in the band's history, as their previous LP Clash the Truth was released in 2013.

== Background ==
After touring in support of their second album Clash the Truth the band took a break. During this time they appeared on the HBO show “Vinyl” as members of the early-'70s punk band "the Nasty Bits." The group then began working on a new album. This time out, Payseur involved the other members of the band in the writing process, with both bassist Jack Doyle Smith and guitarist Tommy Davidson contributing ideas. The songs speak to a more fluid, eclectic sound, filled with lush compositions formed by studio experiments and sampling of the band's own recordings. A decision was also made to incorporate string and woodwind arrangements at various points throughout the album, giving it a larger and eclectic sound as compared to the more conventional four-piece band approach on earlier releases.

"I always have tons of ideas that I talk about, and I forget most of them, but my friends and collaborators Jack and Tommy made me stick to those ideas. I mentioned wanting harpsichord and string arrangements and pedal steel and saxophone and piano. I wanted a song that was Baroque Pop and I wanted a song that was kinda 'Trip Hop', every idea I rattled off in conversation, they remembered and helped me follow through to make it a reality."

— Dustin Payseur

On March 13, 2017, the band revealed the departure of drummer Tommy Gardner, who moved to Shanghai to pursue his interests in becoming a Buddhist monk. In an interview with Adam Budofsky for Modern Drummer, Dustin Payseur said of Gardner's departure, "Tommy was talking about becoming a Buddhist monk and he went on this meditation retreat, so we weren’t sure what the future of him playing with us was going to be. And he wasn’t really involved in the writing process [on Somersault]; the way the three of us wrote before is we’d spend like three hours writing one riff, and I know that if a drummer’s in the room, that’s painful." Gardner had been a part of Beach Fossils since 2011.

== Recording and production ==
For the recording of Somersault, the band enlisted drummer Anton Hochheim, who also serves as the touring drummer for Jerry Paper and The Pains of Being Pure At Heart. Payseur saw the band perform at a record release party and approached Hochheim after the show about playing drums on his album. In an interview with Modern Drummer in 2017, Dustin Payseur said of the recording process, "We asked [Anton] to keep it as minimal as possible. I feel bad. We were sitting there all in the room, staring over his shoulder, probably making him nervous, telling him to keep it like a drum machine, as minimal as possible, but then throw in fills when they feel right. He did such a good job. I was really happy with how he played."

Jonathan Rado of the band Foxygen served as a producer and engineer on Somersault

Somersault was recorded in various locations in Brooklyn, Manhattan, upstate NY, and Los Angeles, including engineer Jonathan Rado's home studio and a cabin in Upstate New York, and featured guest vocals from Slowdive's Rachel Goswell and Cities Aviv. In an Instagram post on June 5, 2019, celebrating the anniversary of the release of the album, Dustin Payseur said of the recording process, "We were sketching out ideas for years while on and off tour, working in “studios” in Brooklyn, Manhattan, Los Angeles and upstate NY... most of these not actually being real studios, but comfortable spaces where we set up our own gear and got to work."

According to drummer Hochheim, recording with Foxygen's Jonathan Rado was very traditional and arduous; "The way Rado likes to record, it’s all analog to tape. He doesn’t have any digital equipment. And he prefers to record song by song, rather than all the drums, then all the bass, etc. That’s why it was time consuming. I’d come in in the early afternoon and we’d do the drums to tape, so there wasn’t the luxury of overdubs. So we’d do it until we had close to a perfect drum take. Then we’d do guitars, then bass, then vocals. So either the next day or two days later, we’d start again with the next song. I’d never worked like that before."

Dustin also commented on recording with Rado in an interview with Vice saying, "Jonathan [Rado of Foxygen] is fun, man. I really enjoyed working with him... Because I really like the way he records drums. So we did all of the drums with him and we redid certain guitar and bass lines. He just gets a really nice, warm sound out of instruments that you just don't hear on other records." He further commented on the scattered nature of the album's recording process, "In the end it's this bizarre mix, because we ended up working in six different studios on this record. It's like each instrument in a song is from a different session and we just put them all together."

In a retrospective interview with KOSU in April 2019, Dustin Payseur was asked about what it has been like writing and performing with a more collaborative band since the release of Somersault, "We sort of play the opposite instruments when we're recording like… on Somersault for example I played bass for that whole record. Then, I shared guitar duties with Jack and Tommy and then Tommy did all the keyboards and stuff. So when we were going to play live, we were all teaching each other our parts. I was showing Jack the bass lines and he was showing me the guitar lines and then like he was showing Tommy like the other guitar lines, and so we’re all showing each other things. Yeah, it was really cool 'cause then you get the other side of how that feels."

== Composition ==
=== Lyrics and Songs ===
In an interview with The Fader, Dustin Paysaeur has said of the themes found on the record, "On Somersault, I’m seeing things that I could be doing better. Where I’ve failed. I’m seeing where I could be a better person. I think it’s really important to admit that. Not even in art, but to yourself. Saying, 'These are the mistakes I’ve made.' Critiquing yourself the same way you would another person. Friendships are just as important as any romantic relationship. The way that you choose certain people around you and who you’re associating with on a regular basis and how you interact with each other … that’s huge."

Lyrical themes found on Somersault include friendship, personal growth, and self-reflection. These themes are evident in the lead single and opening track "This Year", as well as the tracks "Tangerine", and "Rise".

"Tangerine" is a bright, breezy, and carefully layered indie rock tune which features vocal contributions from Slowdive's Rachel Goswell on the song's chorus. Memphis, Tennessee-based rapper Cities Aviv is featured rapping a spoken-word-like verse over a soft, atmospheric beat and smooth saxophone on the album's interlude "Rise". Somersault also incorporates themes of social unrest and political observations as found on Payseur's love-letter to New York City's diversity, the baroque-pop track "Saint Ivy". In an interview with Vice, Dustin Payseur said he wrote the song in the studio the morning after the 2016 Presidential Election. “I feel like the whole city just felt weird that day, and it was just this cloud or something that was just like, fuckin’ Trump is going to be our president,” he said. “And I went in there and just wrote those lyrics.” He also went on to discuss how he felt about the results of the election, “It’s just a fucked-up, sad disappointment with the state of things and the country... This song is not about a relationship, it’s about a relationship with [the] country.”

Tracks like "Sugar" and "Down The Line" recount facing one's demons head on, whether it be dependency or depression. When asked about the song "Down The Line" during an interview with The Fader, Payseur went into great detail about how the song came to be. “It’s a lot about myself, I guess. It’s about me facing depression head on. I was trying to work on music and I was feeling so fucking low. Just like, in the dirt. I couldn’t get anything to happen. My creativity was completely zapped. I was kind of breaking down. I hadn’t really been sleeping. I started working on this song, and I really liked how it was feeling. I put lyrics down. I did the whole song really fast. It was one of the only songs on the record that I did in one or two sittings. I realized if I just kind of faced how I was feeling, I could use it to my advantage. I could let it out."

"Social Jetlag" incorporates a much slower-paced rhythm section, with heavy reverb and atmospheric production. In a review for Stereogum, Chris DeVille praised the track writing, "This latest track is called 'Social Jetlag,' and it casts Dustin Payseur’s dazed vocals against a warm, floating trip-hop groove, like the Beach Fossils version of Endtroducing-era DJ Shadow."

=== Artwork ===
The minimal cover art for Somersault was designed by graphic artist Ryan McCardle, based on a design created by Dustin Payseur. The designs and layout were screen printed on to white linen with red ink by Keegan Cooke and was then photographed by Rebekah Campbell. Ryan McCardle has also designed artwork for several other Captured Tracks artists, creating & collaborating on numerous album covers, layout, and packaging designs. Some of these artists include Wild Nothing, Mac Demarco, DIIV, Craft Spells, Jesse Ruins, Cleaners from Venus, Heavenly Beat, Chastity, Holograms and more.

== Release ==
The album's first promotional single, "This Year", was released on March 2, 2017. Reviewing the track for Stereogum, Chris DeVille wrote "[Beach Fossils'] sound has evolved significantly over the years, but I’ve never heard it translated more beautifully to a hi-fi context than on 'This Year'... The guitars chime with a translucent brightness, the rhythm section surges with purpose, and the string section(!) adds grandeur to a song that was already soaring high above the surface of the Earth."

The second single, "Saint Ivy", was released the following month on April 5, 2017, along with an accompanying music video. The music video aims to pay homage to New York City artists, as it features an abundance of local dancers and a Brooklyn-based drag queen, Merrie Cherry. It received praise from critics, with considerable attention given to the obvious shift in the band's musical direction. It's layered and lush baroque sound and string arrangements were seen as a turning point for the band's songwriting and sound.

On May 1, 2017, the third promotional single from Somersault, titled "Down The Line", was released along with an accompanying video. Something of a companion piece to their “Saint Ivy” video, the music video for "Down The Line" again features Beach Fossils paying homage to New York City, specifically places like the Williamsburg Bridge and the J/Z subway lines.

Two weeks later on May 17, 2017, their fourth and fifth singles "Social Jetlag" and "Tangerine" were released. DIY Magazine described "Social Jetlag" as "An effortlessly elegant cut that shows off Beach Fossils’ boundless versatility." Writing for Vice, Alex Robert Ross praised the track "Tangerine", considering it to be "The lushest Somersault single yet, a dream-pop track with high violins and falsetto coos above chorus-laden acoustics and Dustin Payseur's redolent lyrics."

Somersault was officially released on June 2, 2017, through Bayonet Records on vinyl, CD, cassette, and digital download. One month after the album's release, Beach Fossils embarked on a lengthy world tour that took up the latter half of 2017. During much of the summer they would go on to tour throughout the US and Europe, and would eventually announce US dates in the fall along with supporting acts Snail Mail and raener.

=== Critical reception ===
Professional ratings
Aggregate scores
Source	Rating
Metacritic	81/100
Review scores
Source	Rating
AllMusic	4/5 stars
The A.V. Club	B+
Exclaim!	8/10
Pitchfork	7.3/10
Paste	7.8/10
The Skinny	4 stars
Under the Radar	7/10 stars

Somersault received critical acclaim upon release, with many critics complimenting its brighter tone, layered arrangements, and the more collaborative approach to songwriting within the band. Annie Zaleski of AV Club called it “Far and away Beach Fossils’ finest record yet." Philip Cosores of Pitchfork awarded the album a score of 7.3/10 and wrote in a positive review, "Payseur doesn’t shy from the fact that he’s reaching for something more both lyrically and musically... Somersault is a huge leap for Beach Fossils and includes some of Dustin Payseur’s most nuanced songs to date..." In a very positive review, Exclaim!'s Matt Yuyitung wrote "Where Clash the Truth seemed to hint at great potential for the band's growth, Somersault delivers thanks to more confident songwriting and a greater desire to move forward. The production has improved too: see the enveloping, hazy guitars on "Be Nothing," or the warm vocal harmonies on "May 1st." Aiden Ryan of The Skinny awarded the album four stars, and wrote "Somersault takes a bolder leap forward, taking tropes and palettes from 60s pop, grunge, and even country, and making bold play with strings and horns, piano and harpsichord, surprising effects, freer guitar and more assertive bass." Ryan would conclude that their subjects throughout the album are about "passing time, regrets, resolutions, and the regrets that beget resolutions that mature into new and familiar regrets... This is the band's best yet."

In a four-star review Rhian Daly of DIY complimented their growth in songwriting, "Their [previous] compositions were lush and soothing, but lacked variety. Here, the trio have fixed that issue without compromising an inch of what endeared them to so many before." He also went on to praise the album's collaborative sound, writing "The evident rise in experimentation is due, in part, to bringing Jack and Tommy into the songwriting process. Slowdive’s Rachel Goswell brings a new dimension to the group’s layers on the shuffling, sweet 'Tangerine', while Memphis rapper Cities Aviv takes the lead on 'Rise'. Proof that sometimes sharing your vision can pay off spectacularly."

Paste Magazine critic Reed Strength wrote of the album, "Thanks to a rich sonic palette and more dynamic songwriting, they’ve turned in their best collection of jangly indie rock songs so far." However he criticized frontman Dustin Payseur's lyrics, saying "...the record’s only real flaw is Payseur’s consistently lazy lyric writing. His delivery, still a stoned deadpan, doesn’t offer much gravitas to "Saint Ivy"’s blasé political observations or the paint by numbers disaffected hipster-isms of "Down the Line"

== Track listing ==
No.	Title	Writer(s)	Length
1.	"This Year"	Dustin Payseur, Jack Doyle Smith	2:48
2.	"Tangerine" (Featuring Rachel Goswell)	Tommy Davidson, Payseur, Smith, Caroline Polachek	3:14
3.	"Saint Ivy"	Davidson, Payseur, Smith	3:44
4.	"May 1st"	Davidson, Payseur, Smith	2:59
5.	"Rise" (Featuring Cities Aviv)	Davidson, Payseur, Smith, Gavin Mays	1:41
6.	"Sugar"	Davidson, Payseur	3:24
7.	"Closer Everywhere"	Davidson, Payseur, Smith	3:16
8.	"Social Jetlag"	Gardner, Payseur	3:02
9.	"Down the Line"	Payseur	2:38
10.	"Be Nothing"	Davidson, Payseur, Smith	5:01
11.	"That's All for Now"	Payseur, Smith	3:11

== Personnel ==
All personnel information found in the liner notes of the album.

Beach Fossils

- Dustin Payseur – vocals, electric guitar, bass, slide guitar, drum programming, shakers, string arrangement, tambourine, art direction, composer, mixing, producer
- Tommy Davidson – acoustic guitar, electric guitar, composer, vocals, piano, electric harpsichord, string arrangement
- Jack Doyle Smith – electric guitar, acoustic guitar, bass, 12 string guitar, vibraphone, string arrangement, additional drums
- Anton Hochheim – drums

Additional Credits

- Rachel Goswell – vocals on "Tangerine"
- Gavin Mays – vocals on "Rise"
- Eric Gorfain – violin
- Daphne Chen – Viola
- Richard Dodd – cello
- Jon Catfish Delormen – pedal steel guitar
- Mac DeMarco – drum programming on "Tangerine"
- Josh Plotner – flute
- Thomas Gardner – saxophone
- Michael Harris – double bass
- Jonathan Rado – producer, engineer
- Alex Epton - mixing, drums on "Down The Line"
- Josh Bonati – mastering
- Ryan McCardle – layout and design
- Keegan Cooke – screenprinting
- Rebekah Campbell – cover photograph
- Franck Bohbot – gatefold photograph
