= Beautiful Noise (disambiguation) =

Beautiful Noise is a 1976 album by Neil Diamond, and its title track.

Beautiful Noise may also refer to:

== Film and television ==
- Beautiful Noise (film), a 2014 music documentary
- Beautiful Noise (TV series), a 2006 music television series

== Music ==
- Beautiful Noise (Lee Kernaghan album), 2012 recording, or its title track
- Beautiful Noise, 2000 album by Steve Hofmeyr
- Beautiful Noise, 2005 album by Salim Nourallah
- Beautiful Noise, 2008 album by A Fragile Tomorrow
- A Beautiful Noise (musical), 2022 production based on the life and music of Neil Diamond

=== Songs ===
- "Beautiful Noise", title track from the 1976 album of the same name by Neil Diamond
- "A Beautiful Noise", 2020 song by Alicia Keys and Brandi Carlile song
- "Beautiful Noise", 2003 song by The Diplomats from Diplomatic Immunity
