= Nocturne (Wild Nothing album) =

Studio album by Wild Nothing
- Released: August 28, 2012
- Studio: Rare Book Room (Brooklyn, New York)
- Genre: Indie pop; dream pop
- Length: 44:31
- Label: Captured Tracks
- Producer: Nicolas Vernhes

Wild Nothing chronology
Golden Haze (2010)	Nocturne (2012)	Empty Estate (2013)

Cover variations
- The vinyl edition's six interchangeable inserts

Nocturne is the second studio album by American indie rock band Wild Nothing, released on August 28, 2012, by Captured Tracks.

== Background and recording ==
The success of Wild Nothing's debut allowed Jack Tatum to record in a full studio for its follow-up, a change of pace from Gemini's exclusive use of the laptop for recording. Working with producer Nicolas Vernhes, Tatum stated: "The biggest thing was just having a producer, having somebody extremely knowledgeable to work with. I mean, obviously I had a lot of nice equipment at my disposal for the first time, too ... But I never wanted to use any of that to pursue a wholly different sound to the first album; it was just nice to have somebody to bounce ideas off, to help me tweak things". "Shadow", the first song from Nocturne to be released, features a string section, something Tatum "never" could have done without a studio environment.

Despite the album's widespread critical acclaim and a Best New Music nod from Pitchfork, Tatum reflected on the album's recording process in 2013, stating: "[Nocturne] felt like it took a long time for me. I took my time and it was really spread out, with months in between writing songs. There was so much thought put into that record, so much of me being a perfectionist, like, 'Okay, this really has to sound a certain way.' In a lot of ways, I listen to that record now and think I thought way too hard on this. To me, it’s sort of missing something… even though I'm so proud of that record and I think a lot of the songs are good. I mean, you should like your own music, otherwise why even make it?"

== Critical reception ==
Professional ratings
Aggregate scores
Source	Rating
Metacritic	75/100
Review scores
Source	Rating
AllMusic	4/5 stars
The A.V. Club	B
Drowned in Sound	7/10
Earbuddy	8.9/10
Exclaim!	7/10
musicOMH	4/5 stars
NME	7/10
PopMatters	8/10 stars
Pitchfork	8.3/10

Nocturne received largely positive reviews from contemporary music critics. At Metacritic, which assigns a normalized rating out of 100 to reviews from mainstream critics, the album received an average score of 75, based on 27 reviews, which indicates "generally favorable reviews". The album was ranked the best album of the year by Under the Radar magazine, while on DIY magazine's 2012 year-end list, it was listed at No. 25.

Ian Cohen of Pitchfork gave the album a positive review, stating, "Wild Nothing is invested in the concept of wish fulfillment. This is called dream-pop for a reason, and there's no logic for what drives adults to lie out on the grass staring at the sun for hours or write songs about girls with fantastical names like "Rheya". Nocturne gives a voice to those feelings, and damn if it isn't lovely to listen to".

=== Legacy ===
Experimental music project Safety Scissor Death Squad sampled "Only Heather" for their song "6" from their 2018 EP Vice Lord, Part Two: Scenes. Vol 1, which later appeared on their album vice lord, part two.

== Track listing ==
All tracks are written by Jack Tatum

No.	Title	Length
1.	"Shadow"	4:21
2.	"Midnight Song"	3:07
3.	"Nocturne"	5:20
4.	"Through the Grass"	4:30
5.	"Only Heather"	3:16
6.	"This Chain Won't Break"	3:40
7.	"Disappear Always"	3:31
8.	"Paradise"	5:33
9.	"Counting Days"	3:54
10.	"The Blue Dress"	3:30
11.	"Rheya"	3:55
Total length:		44:31

iTunes bonus track
No.	Title	Length
12.	"Feel You Now"	5:00

== Personnel ==
Musicians

- Jack Tatum – vocals, guitars, bass guitar
- Michael Skattum – drums (2)
- Jeff Curtin – drums (1, 3, 5, 6, 7, 9, 10 and 11)
- Ben Talmi – string arrangements and conducting (1)
- Tanner Johnson – first violin (1)
- Madeline Ripley – second violin (1)
- Sue Buzzard – viola (1)
- Kim Lonetree – cello (1)

Recording personnel

- Nicolas Vernhes – producer, mixing, engineer
- Jack Tatum – additional production, additional mixing
- Joe Lambert – mastering

Artwork

- Shawn Brackbill – photography
- Jack Tatum – album design
- Ryan McCardle – layout
- New York Public Library – cover photo and inserts
