= Indigo (Wild Nothing album) =

Studio album by Wild Nothing
- Released: August 31, 2018
- Genres: Dream pop; indie pop; space rock
- Length: 41:09
- Label: Captured Tracks

Wild Nothing chronology
Life of Pause (2016)	Indigo (2018)	Hold (2023)

Singles from Indigo
- 1. "Letting Go" Released: 2018; 2. "Partners in Motion" Released: 2018; 3. "Shallow Water" Released: 2018; 4. "Canyon on Fire" Released: 2018

Professional ratings
Aggregate scores
Source	Rating
Metacritic	70/100
Review scores
Source	Rating
AllMusic	4/5 stars
Pitchfork	6.3/10
Paste	5.5/10
Clash	8/10 stars
The 405	6/10 stars
Drowned in Sound	6/10 stars
DIY	3/5 stars

Indigo is the fourth studio album by American indie rock act Wild Nothing, released on August 30, 2018 on Captured Tracks.

== Track listing ==
No.	Title	Length
1.	"Letting Go"	3:41
2.	"Oscillation"	3:50
3.	"Partners in Motion"	4:20
4.	"Wheel of Misfortune"	4:15
5.	"Shallow Water"	4:06
6.	"Through Windows"	3:19
7.	"The Closest Thing to Living"	3:34
8.	"Dollhouse"	1:17
9.	"Canyon on Fire"	4:44
10.	"Flawed Translation"	3:58
11.	"Bend"	4:05
Total length:		41:09
