= Life of Pause =

Studio album by Wild Nothing
- Released: February 19, 2016
- Genre: Dream pop; indie pop; space rock
- Length: 49:38
- Label: Captured Tracks (US); Bella Union (UK)
- Producer: Thom Monahan

Wild Nothing chronology
Empty Estate (2013)	Life of Pause (2016)	Indigo (2018)

Singles from Life of Pause
- 1. "To Know You" Released: November 24, 2015; 2. "TV Queen" Released: November 24, 2015; 3. "Reichpop" Released: January 5, 2016; 4. "A Woman's Wisdom" Released: February 9, 2016

Life of Pause is the third studio album by American indie rock act Wild Nothing, released on February 19, 2016, on Captured Tracks and Bella Union. Produced by Thom Monahan, the album was recorded over several weeks in Los Angeles and Stockholm, Sweden, and was preceded by five singles: "To Know You", "TV Queen", "Reichpop", "Life of Pause", and "A Woman's Wisdom".

Recorded mostly by primary member Jack Tatum, the album's aesthetic was influenced by Philly soul.

== Critical reception ==
Professional ratings
Aggregate scores
Source	Rating
Metacritic	74/100
Review scores
Source	Rating
AllMusic	4/5 stars
Consequence of Sound	B−
Drowned in Sound	5/10
The Guardian	3/5 stars
Mojo	3/5 stars
musicOMH	4/5 stars
Pitchfork	6.5/10
PopMatters	8/10 stars
Q	4/5 stars
Spin	7/10

Life of Pause received largely positive reviews from contemporary music critics. At Metacritic, which assigns a normalized rating out of 100 to reviews from mainstream critics, the album received an average score of 74, based on 25 reviews, which indicates "generally favorable reviews".

Jessica Goodman of DIY gave the album a favorable review, stating, "‘Life of Pause’ is a departure from expectation. The escapist notions that soared through previous releases are grounded in the record's lavish production. Where flights of fancy once soared, the melodies are a damnsight more tangible. With tracks so vivid they can practically be tasted, Wild Nothing have lost none of the ability to put a daze upon the senses. Taking an unmistakable euphoria and driving it home, with ‘Life of Pause’ Wild Nothing might have planted their feet firmly on the ground, but that hasn't stopped Jack Tatum from creating a soundscape straight from your wooziest daydream."

Ben Homewood of NME also praised the album, stating, "Such confident, experimental songwriting points to a rebirth for Wild Nothing, and means ‘Life Of Pause’ can be considered alongside indie records like Tame Impala’s ‘Currents’ and Unknown Mortal Orchestra’s ‘Multi-Love’. Both came out last year, signalling a shift in sound and a significant step forward for their makers. This record should do the same for Jack Tatum."

Dan Lucas of Drowned in Sound was more critical of the album, stating, "Life of Pause sounds effortless but not in a good way: it sounds like a de rigueur acclaimed indie album. It sounds like a record that’s designed to be acclaimed and liked but not remembered. The extra spark that made the likes of ‘Chinatown, ‘Paradise’ or ‘The Body in Rainfall’ such magnificent, memorable tracks is missing here. It is hard to criticise such a well-crafted, enjoyable album that appears to have been made specifically with someone like me in mind. The thing is that in six weeks’ time it will be even harder to remember it."

== Track listing ==
All tracks are written by Jack Tatum.

No.	Title	Length
1.	"Reichpop"	4:51
2.	"Lady Blue"	5:00
3.	"A Woman's Wisdom"	4:09
4.	"Japanese Alice"	2:43
5.	"Life of Pause"	3:06
6.	"Alien"	3:52
7.	"To Know You"	5:56
8.	"Adore"	4:55
9.	"TV Queen"	3:51
10.	"Whenever I"	4:57
11.	"Love Underneath My Thumb"	6:18
Total length:		49:38

Japanese edition bonus tracks
No.	Title	Length
12.	"Above"	2:47
13.	"The Bull"	4:01
Total length:		55:86

== Personnel ==
=== Musicians ===
- Jack Tatum - vocals, guitars, bass guitar, keyboards, percussion
- John Eriksson - drums (1, 3, 4, 5, 6, 7), marimba (1), percussion (1)
- Brad Laner - guitars (1, 4, 7), synth (5), backing vocals (5)
- Thom Monahan - backing vocals (2, 3, 5, 6, 8, 10, 11)
- Caitlin Gutenberger - backing vocals (1, 2, 3, 4, 5, 6, 11)
- Elroy Finn - drums (2, 9, 10)
- Josh Adams - drums (8, 11)
- Tommy Gardner - saxophone (2, 9, 10)
- Casey Butler - saxophone (2, 11)
- Pelle Jacobsson - marimba (1), percussion (1)
- Tess Shapiro - backing vocals (1, 11)

== Charts ==
Chart (2016)	Peak position
Belgian Albums (Ultratop Flanders)	195
US Billboard 200	170
