= Lionlimb =

American indie rock musical duo

Lionlimb is the indie rock musical project of musician Stewart Bronaugh and drummer Joshua Jaeger. The duo has released four full-length albums, all with Bayonet Records. The duos first album, Shoo, was released in 2016.

== History ==
In 2018, the duo released their second full-length album titled Tape Recorder.

In 2022, the duo released their third full-length album titled Spiral Groove. In 2024, Lionlimb released their latest full-length album, titled Limbo.

In addition to making music as Lionlimb, Bronaugh is a collaborator with Angel Olsen.
