= Golden Haze =

EP by Wild Nothing
- Released: October 13, 2010
- Genre: Indie rock; dream pop
- Length: 19:53
- Language: English
- Label: Captured Tracks
- Producer: Jack Tatum

Wild Nothing chronology
| Gemini (2010) | Golden Haze (2010) | Nocturne (2012) |

Golden Haze is an EP by American indie rock act Wild Nothing, released on October 13, 2010 on Captured Tracks. Released less than five months after the band's debut album, Gemini (2010), Golden Haze was written and recorded by primary recording artist Jack Tatum.

The tracks "Golden Haze", "Take Me In" and "Your Rabbit Feet" previously appeared on the EP Evertide (Warmest Chord).

== Critical reception ==
Professional ratings
Review scores
| Source | Rating |
|---|---|
| Pitchfork | 7.7/10 |
| The Quietus | positive |

Pitchfork's Ian Cohen gave the EP a mostly positive review, writing: "Golden Haze initially appears to be the culmination of Wild Nothing's big year, collecting the previously available Evertide EP, a Gemini B-side, and two new tracks. But as a State of Wild Nothing Report, it shows that Tatum is nowhere near done messing with his favorite musical ingredients." The Quietus also gave the EP a positive review, stating: "It's classic jangle-pop with something slightly deeper lurking underneath, the Field Mice covering the darker corners of the Cure's oeuvre, an EP brimming with promise, full of the sounds of someone constantly honing their craft in the pursuit of distant perfection."

== Track listing ==
All tracks are written by Jack Tatum.

| No. | Title | Length |
|---|---|---|
| 1. | "Golden Haze" | 3:25 |
| 2. | "Quiet Hours" | 2:39 |
| 3. | "Take Me In" | 3:26 |
| 4. | "Your Rabbit Feet" | 5:08 |
| 5. | "Asleep" | 2:11 |
| 6. | "Vultures Like Lovers" | 3:04 |
| Total length: | | 19:53 |

== Recording personnel ==
- Jack Tatum - all instruments, production
