= Beach Fossils (album) =

Studio album by Beach Fossils
- Released: May 25, 2010
- Recorded: 2009–2010
- Genre: Indie rock; dream pop; surf rock; jangle pop
- Length: 34:01
- Label: Captured Tracks
- Producer: Dustin Payseur

Beach Fossils chronology
Beach Fossils (2010)	What a Pleasure (EP) (2011)

Singles from Beach Fossils
- 1. "Daydream" Released: January 22, 2010

Beach Fossils is the debut album by American indie rock band Beach Fossils. The album was written, recorded, and produced entirely by frontman Dustin Payseur and was released on May 25, 2010, through Captured Tracks.

== Background ==
After a brief stint at community college in North Carolina, Dustin Payseur moved to New York City in 2008 to pursue his interests in recording music. Known for distant, faded vocals, and lo-fi reverberating instrumentations, Payseur formed Beach Fossils in early 2009 as a vehicle of expansion for a solo project. That same year, bassist John Peña and guitarist Christopher Sennott Burke were recruited, followed by Zachary Cole Smith on drums. After signing to Captured Tracks and quickly pulling together a live band, they took off playing countless shows across the U.S. gathering a slew of devoted fans in their wake. Their debut single, Daydream/Desert Sand was released in February 2010 through Captured Tracks. The photo used as the album cover was taken by Payseur at his parents' house in Charlotte, North Carolina.

On May 18, 2021, Beach Fossils announced via Instagram that they would perform a livestream show of the band playing both Beach Fossils and What A Pleasure EP in their entirety. The livestream was held on June 10, 2021, and coincided with the 11th anniversary of their debut album as well as the 10th anniversary of What A Pleasure.

== Reception ==
Professional ratings
Aggregate scores
Source	Rating
Metacritic	73/100
Review scores
Source	Rating
AllMusic	4/5 stars
Pitchfork	7.8/10
The New York Times	8/10

Beach Fossils received generally positive reviews from critics. In a positive review, Ian Cohen of Pitchfork wrote "The way Payseur's vocals are masked with reverb brings to mind the early singles of the Clientele, while the interlocking musicianship bears a lot of similarity to their tourmates in Real Estate." However he went on to criticize its direction, writing "While Payseur has an ingenuity with melody, what keeps him from reaching the heights of those acts is a lack of true immersion... The mundanity of Beach Fossils can be deflating, and you don't catch much on the fifth listen that you didn't on the first."

Regarding its writing and style, John Caramanica of The New York Times said of the album "Stop me if you’ve heard this one before: one-man band makes hazy, but surprisingly sturdy, pop-influenced indie rock with mild seaside flourishes." He went on to compliment the album for creating a unique sound regardless of its minimal approach, "How this sort of music became a cliché in the space of just the past year or so speaks to the speed and density of the Internet. And yet the self-titled Beach Fossils debut, on Captured Tracks, manages to not feel overly 2009." Also commenting on Beach Fossils' familiar yet unique sound, Allmusic wrote "Payseur’s songs are instantly catchy and his voice betrays no smirkiness, just pure innocence. The focus and clarity of his playing and arrangement also give the record an originality that lets the record stand out from the hissing crowd."

== Track listing ==
All songs written and recorded by Dustin Payseur.

1. "Sometimes" – 2:56
2. "Youth" – 2:37
3. "Vacation" – 3:46
4. "Lazy Day" – 3:05
5. "Twelve Roses" – 2:20
6. "Daydream" – 3:04
7. "Golden Age" – 4:46
8. "Window View" – 4:06
9. "The Horse" – 2:45
10. "Wide Awake" – 3:06
11. "Gathering" – 1:36
