= Wide Awake, South Carolina =

- Unincorporated community
- Location within South Carolina Location within the United States
- Coordinates: 33°2′51″N 80°6′25″W
- Country: United States
- State: South Carolina
- County: Berkeley
- Named after: An expression
- Elevation: 69 ft (21 m)
- Time zone: UTC-5 (Eastern (EST))
  - Summer (DST): UTC-4 (EDT)
- ZIP code: 29483-29486
- Area code: 843 and 854
- GNIS feature ID: 1234674

Wide Awake is an unincorporated community in Berkeley County, South Carolina, United States. The community is located northeast of Summerville, along U.S. Route 17 Alternate. The community name was established around the early 1900s; however, the origin of the name comes from two possible expressions: The first describing the area as being wide awake politically, the second being regardless of the time of day or night, someone is wide awake to what their neighbors are doing.
