= Beautiful Noise (film) =

2014 documentary film directed by Eric Green

- Official film poster
- Directed by: Eric Green
- Written by: Eric Green
- Produced by: Eric Green; Sarah Ogletree
- Starring: Kevin Shields; Jim Reid; Robin Guthrie; Bobby Gillespie; Douglas Hart; Colm Ó Cíosóig; Debbie Googe; Simon Raymonde
- Edited by: Sarah Ogletree
- Music by: Brad Laner
- Production company: HypFilms
- Release date: May 31, 2014 (Seattle International Film Festival)
- Running time: 90 minutes
- Country: United States
- Language: English
- Budget: $84,740

Beautiful Noise is a 2014 American music documentary film, written and directed by Eric Green. The film documents three rock bands—Cocteau Twins, the Jesus and Mary Chain, and My Bloody Valentine—and their influence on shoegazing and other alternative rock genres. Beautiful Noise features extracts from over 50 interviews with bands and artists, as well as archival footage and music videos.

Green commenced production on Beautiful Noise in early 2005 with producer and editor Sarah Ogletree; production was largely completed by 2008 although the project stagnated due to various financial and legal issues. In response, Green began a successful crowdfunding campaign on Kickstarter in hopes of securing final financial investment for the film's release. The campaign was supported by several of the bands featured in Beautiful Noise through social media.

Beautiful Noise was announced for release in May 2014 and premiered at the Seattle International Film Festival in Seattle, Washington on May 31, 2014.

== Overview ==
Beautiful Noise documents the underground music movement in the United Kingdom in the late 1980s and early 1990s, focusing in particular on the Scottish ethereal/dream pop band Cocteau Twins, Scottish noise pop band the Jesus and Mary Chain and the Irish alternative rock band My Bloody Valentine. The film explores "how their groundbreaking music inspired generations of bands", including shoegazing artists Ride, Slowdive, Chapterhouse, and Lush. Beautiful Noise features extracts from over 50 interviews with members of various bands, as well as "special appearances" from The Flaming Lips' vocalist–guitarist Wayne Coyne, Nine Inch Nails' frontman Trent Reznor, Billy Corgan of The Smashing Pumpkins and Robert Smith of The Cure.

In addition to interviews, Beautiful Noise includes never-before-seen footage, television appearances, music videos and tour projections of the film's featured bands. The film also "highlights new bands influenced by [shoegazing]", such as A Place to Bury Strangers, Wild Nothing and M83.

== Production ==
Beautiful Noise was written and directed by Eric Green, produced and edited by Sarah Ogletree and presented by their studio company HypFilms. Green conceived the idea for the project in late 2004 after concluding that there were "a million documentaries about the Beatles, punk [and] rap" but no similar documentaries about bands he was a "longtime fan" of. Pre-production of Beautiful Noise began in early 2005 and by March, Green and Ogletree had commenced production on the film. Green's interviews with the film's featured cast "spanned over several years".

In 2007, an email was leaked to a journalist about Beautiful Noise. Several prominent publications, including The Guardian, NPR and Pitchfork Media reported on the film and "inspired a wider of level of interest" from the public. As a result, Green and Ogletree began a crowdfunding campaign on Kickstarter to raise finances to cover licensing of the music featured in the film, as well as clearances and distribution. Green hoped to raise $75,000 on Kickstarter and the campaign was supported by various artists raising awareness via social media. The project was successfully funded on December 16, 2012 and a further $9,740 was pledged after a total of 1,511 users contributed.

During early stages of production, from 2005 to 2007, Ogletree edited various versions of Beautiful Noise from rough scripts provided by Green. Multiple edits of the film featured archival footage with "personally custom designed art" which was the result of collaborations with artist Angus Cameron. Medicine founder Brad Laner also contributed a musical score to the film. Following public awareness of the film after the 2007 email leak, John Nugent and Timothy O'Donnell contributed further artwork to the film, presented alongside Cameron's additions. A final edit of Beautiful Noise was completed by Ogletree after Green's successful campaign on Kickstarter.

== Release ==
Beautiful Noise was originally set for release in 2008. Green and Ogletree attempted to find a distributor, however, several factors—including the expense of music clearance and licensing, the 2008 financial crisis and the general decline in DVD sales—prompted "an ever-elusive" release date. Upon starting the campaign on Kickstarter, Green mentioned an estimated release date in 2013, although delays in licensing affected the appraisal. Beautiful Noise was subsequently announced for release in May 2014; the film premiered at the Seattle International Film Festival in Seattle, Washington on May 31 and the international premiere was held at the Sheffield DocFest in Sheffield, England on June 8.
