= Jerry Paper =

American songwriter and producer

- Also known as: Zonotope™; Jerry Paper
- Born: Lucas Nathan; August 7, 1990 (age 36); Los Angeles, California, U.S.
- Genres: Electronic; synth-pop; easy listening; lounge music; muzak; lo-fi
- Occupations: Musician; singer; songwriter; producer
- Years active: 2009–present
- Labels: Orange Milk; Hausu Mountain; Stones Throw

Lucas Nathan (born August 7, 1990), best known by the stage name Jerry Paper, is an American singer, songwriter and producer. They began releasing music in 2009, with their first projects being Zonotope™ and the noise music project Diane Kensington Devotional Band. They subsequently created the persona-based project Jerry Paper, and has been releasing music under the name since 2012.

== Early life ==
Nathan said that as a child, they were influenced to learn music by the fact that "all [their] friends were making music." They learned how to play "The Simpsons Theme" on the piano when they were five, played bongos for their school band, and were a drummer. They learned how to play the Misfits song "London Dungeon" on bass guitar (in eighth grade), made psychedelic folk recordings in their bedroom with Sony Acid, and performed in various bands at school. The first group they were in was a comedy rock band named The Corrupt Ice Cream Vendors. They got into several noise and psychedelic acts like Growing and Devendra Banhart in their teen years after being exposed to them via the magazine Arthur, and later got into free jazz and krautrock. Nathan originally wanted to perform in the "cool band[s]" they saw at school and their summer camps, but they were turned down by all of them due to their "nerdy" look, which influenced them to become a solo artist.

== Career ==
=== 2009–2012: Zonotope™ and Diane Kensington Devotional Band ===
Nathan stated that as a "pretentious teenager", they "refused to listen to anything that wasn't 1966 to 1968." Therefore, it was "part of [their] personality" that they despised electronic music. However, they experimented with their friend's Roland HS-60 synthesizer, finding the sounds it produced fascinating. This inspired them to make electronic music as a way of taking the "challenge" of "find[ing] a way to like" the genre. Nathan began producing music in 2009, and their first project was Zonotope™, a four-album "propaganda series" promoting a Southern California-based "alternative spiritual community" named the Temple of Pure Information and Mainframe Devotion. They also had a noise project named Diane Kensington Devotional Band, which depicts Nathan as the eponymous female who starts a fictional religion based on traveling into the "space between the 1 and the 0" through the ritual of "Trance Channels".

=== 2012–2015: Jerry Paper ===
The name of Jerry Paper first appeared in the credits of the Zonotope™ album Excellent Realms (2010), where Paper was given a "special thanks" for "building The Mainframe." The story of the project involves Paper quitting from the spiritual community setting of Zonotope™ to find a "less orthodox alternative spirituality." Nathan described Paper's music as "slightly less abstract" than their works for Zonotope™, and the project's titular character is caused by a "ritual" that transforms Nathan into Paper. Paper often wears a garland and a silk robe and acts like a "weirdo" who does "whatever the hell [they want]," such as become "romantically involved with a giant chameleon" and dance "like someone who just discovered movement five minutes ago," Koen van Bommel stated.

Nathan explained that they wrote International Man of Misery (2013), "a cartoonish version of depression," as a way to poke fun on the "ridiculously melodramatic thoughts" they went through at the time. Fuzzy Logic (2013) is about how modern living is complicated by technology and politics.

Feels Emotion, released on February 11, 2014, involved Nathan taking on, as Decoder magazine put it, more "ambitious" production techniques than their previous albums such as in sampling, an example being the cat sounds on "Holy Shit." The LP also has some tracks where Nathan focused on non-repetitive pop structures instead of the typical verse–chorus form, including "I Feel Emotions," "Unless It’s," "Other Please," and "Heartbreak Module #3."

On August 24, 2014, Nathan released what they considered their "first successful concept album," the Jerry Paper LP Big Pop For Chameleon World, a soundtrack for their Unity game Dr. Javer's Genneheigen's Chameleon World. The album explores simulacra, looking for "the dividing line" between a real object and a simulated version of it. In doing so, it uses synthesized replications of acoustic instruments, such as a square wave keyboard sound meant to be a harpsichord texture. According to The Fader, the use of these sounds gives the album a more "uncanny" vibe than Nathan's previous releases.

=== 2015–present ===
The same palette of instruments were later used on their next album Carousel (2015).

For making Carousel, Nathan wrote the songs in the same manner as for their previous release; however, the analog keyboard Nathan usually used for creating their music had broken, meaning they had to rely on digital synthesizer sounds for Carousel. they said the album consisted of a bunch of "hilarious sounds." As they described making the LP's lead single, "I was just trying to come up with the funniest sounds to go together – like tubular bells, and standup bass, and harpsichord, and then it goes into disco funk."

Toon Time Raw! was recorded with the band BadBadNotGood at their studio in Toronto. The band acted as Nathan's anonymous backing band, being billed as "Easy Feelings Unlimited". Toon Time Raw! involves anthropomorphic animals dealing with human issues. The record was performed with a record release party on June 19, 2016, at Brooklyn's art gallery place Secret Project Robot. It was Nathan's first headlining performance that they performed with a backing band, a contrast from their previous live performances where they sang with machines performing the backing tracks. As Madison Bloom of Audiofemme covered the event, "it was an evening of undeniably odd birds, but what a wonderful thing to see when so many modern bands are required to be ultra slick and fronted by supermodels," and the band's setup had "great versatility via keyboards, guitar, pedal effects, and flute."

On September 15, 2017, American rapper Kari Faux released "Gotta Know," a track from her extended play Primary. Nathan produced the track under the Jerry Paper pseudonym and also received a "featuring" credit on the song. Faux noticed Nathan's work via the "suggested artists" feature on Spotify, and, as she explained, she "was stuck on [their] music for a good three months, that was all I was listening to, and I would catch myself rapping to [them]." This led her to contact Nathan via Twitter before the two came together personally in Los Angeles to collaborate. Like a Baby was released in 2018. "Your Cocoon" and "Grey Area" debuted on the website Bandcamp as promotional singles for the album, which features Weyes Blood and Charlotte Day Wilson as collaborators. According to the Stones Throw Records website, the album delves into existential topics pertaining to "the endless human cycle of desire and satisfaction". In the same year, Nathan also featured on Tyler, the Creator's debut extended play Music Inspired by Illumination & Dr. Seuss' The Grinch on the track "Hot Chocolate".

On May 15, 2020, Nathan released a new album titled Abracadabra. The song "Quicksand" was teased first while "Puppeteer" and "Cholla" were released on their Bandacamp profile and Spotify. Two years later, Nathan announced the release of their new album Free Time with first single "Kno Me". The album centers around Nathan's coming out as non-binary and was released on April 15, 2022, on Stones Throw Records.

== Musical style and philosophies ==
"[Richard Rorty] wrote this excellent short book that I think everyone should read called Contingency, Irony, and Solidarity. In it he talks about how philosophy is futile and an outdated vocabulary to try to get things that we can’t get. What he proposes is narrative as an alternative-- to philosophy, to religion, an alternative to basically all moral or philosophical constructs. And I am heavily invested in this idea. I focus a lot on, instead of trying to explain mystical experience, to try to create a context and a vocabulary that maybe gets at it slightly more. And I feel that way with music as well."

— Nathan on the philosophy they use to produce their music

During their teen years living in Los Angeles, Nathan hung around several Scientology and Mormon centers. They were curious about fervent believers and it felt foreign and interesting to them as they was raised in an atheist household. It was during this time that they got into direct experience, the idea that language cannot clearly state what someone gains via sensory perception. This, as well as their love for the "ritual" of religion, would later become the basis of how they develop their music: "Musical sounds act as symbols, but they carry information that can bypass linguistic processing. That was my main focus. I wanted to investigate that freaky idea." They explained that "instead of trying to explain mystical experience," they "try to create a context and a vocabulary that maybe gets at [a philosophy] slightly more."

Nathan is into the idea of fuzzy logic, or what goes on between the binary numbers of zero and one. Their Diane Kensington project and the title track of the Jerry Paper album Fuzzy Logic are based on the concept. As they opined, "Binaries are a very helpful way to deal with things. They’re a pretty good tool when it comes to categorizing the world and figuring things out. But it’s not actually how the world works." Another primary purpose for Nathan making music is to keep "put[ting] [them]self in uncomfortable situations."

Nathan's reason for producing and performing music under alter egos like Jerry Paper is that they help them figure out more about their actual self:

I feel like having the alter ego allows me to be even more of myself, whereas I feel like Lucas Nathan, who I am in everyday life, changes based on the scenario and who I’m talking to. I have to be polite, I have to be a normal member of society. But with Jerry, he’s not real, he can be anything.

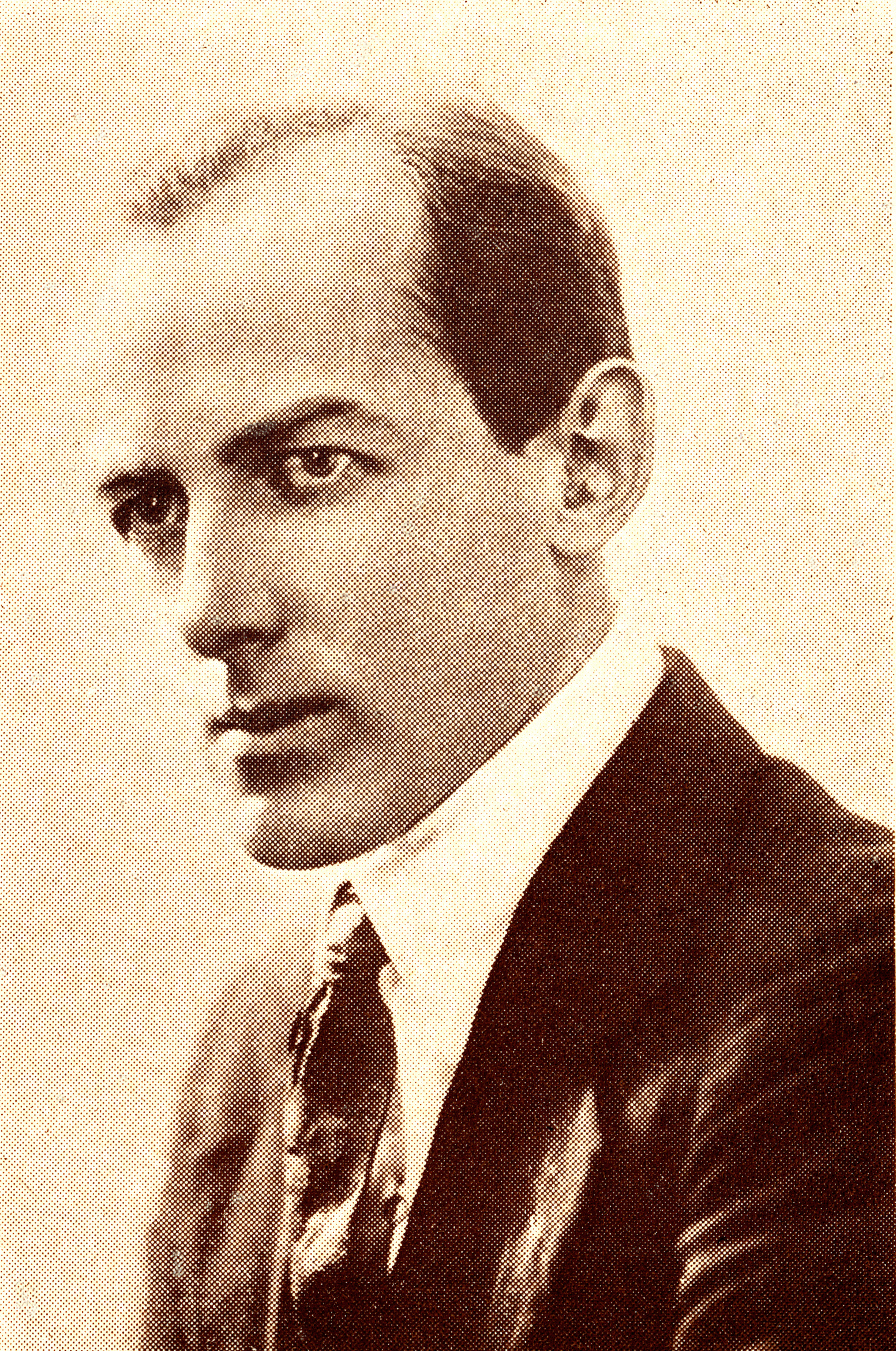
The works of Henry Cowell (pictured) inspired Nathan to play with the limitations of pop music.

"What...is more human than a computer? That doesn’t happen outside of humans. Electronics are purely human tools", Nathan discussed in an interview with The Editorial Magazine. This translates into Nathan's musical style, which Bloom described as "genre-less" but compared to Daft Punk in that it combines the "coldness of technology with the foolproof warmth of human music." Nathan explains that musically, their works play around with the limitations of pop music. This limitation aspect of their works was inspired by the piano-only works of Henry Cowell: "He has that piece, "The Banshee," where he's scraping his finger nails on the piano strings. Fucking incredible. He used the piano in a different way." This is why, until Toon Time Raw!, they didn't use MIDI software because they would've otherwise "ha[d] a huge amount of choices."

== Themes ==
Nathan, in both their songs and the music videos for them, takes on comic views of real life because, in their words, the "world isn’t so serious." All of Nathan's music attempts to get a view of alternate universes, and "because I feel that music isn’t really the arena for truth, I often write lyrics focusing on the irrational," they said. In terms of live stage performances, Nathan dances in comic yet profound routines and delivers, in a deadpan tone, indifferent aphorisms that are also in the lyrics of their songs. As they said while performing live at their release party for Toon Time Raw!, “It’s great to be alive. But having a body is sooo annoying. But you are a body, so…fuck it."

A common major theme in Nathan's records is anxieties, how they "feel very immediate and true in the moment but in hindsight often register as products of absurd logic." The lyrics of their works represent feelings of hopelessness and concern of where to go in life in the future, which are translated "into a subtly self-aware revision of easy listening," Decoder analyzed. As Bloom stated, "Though wearing the guise of empathetic AI and employing tools of the Muzak genre such as keyboard saxophone and elevator synths, they manages to make sincere, and more importantly good music that is relatable to humans and algorithms alike."

== Personal life ==
Born and raised in Los Angeles, Nathan moved to Manhattan where they attended The New School in 2008 to study sociomusicology and philosophy of religion. They lived in Brooklyn as of 2014, but relocated back to California in 2016. They are married. Nathan is non-binary and uses they/them pronouns.

== Discography ==
=== As Jerry Paper ===
==== Studio albums ====
List of studio albums with details
Title	Album details
Vol. I	Released: January 25, 2012 (Worldwide); Label: Digitalis Limited; Formats: Cassette, digital download
Fuzzy Logic	Released: October 17, 2013 (Worldwide); Label: Digitalis Limited; Formats: Cassette, digital download
Feels Emotions	Released: February 11, 2014 (Worldwide); Label: Patient Sounds; Formats: LP, digital download
Big Pop For Chameleon World	Released: August 20, 2014 (Worldwide); Label: Orange Milk; Formats: LP, digital download
Carousel	Released: March 31, 2015 (Worldwide); Label: Bayonet; Formats: CD, LP, digital download
Like a Baby	Released: October 12, 2018 (Worldwide); Label: Stones Throw Records; Formats: CD, LP, digital download
Abracadabra	Released: May 15, 2020 (Worldwide); Label: Stones Throw Records; Formats: CD, LP, digital download
Free Time	Released: April 15, 2022 (Worldwide); Label: Stones Throw Records; Formats: LP, digital download
Inbetweezer	Released: September 27, 2024; Label: Stones Throw Records; Formats: LP, digital

==== Collaborative albums ====
List of collaborative albums with details
Title	Album details
Toon Time Raw! (with Easy Feelings Unlimited)	Released: June 17, 2016 (Worldwide); Label: Bayonet; Formats: CD, LP, digital download

==== Mini-albums ====
List of mini-albums with details
Title	Album details
International Man of Misery	Released: September 17, 2013 (Worldwide); Label: Orange Milk; Formats: Cassette, digital download

==== Split albums ====
List of split albums with details
Title	Album details
The Now Sound For Today's Lovers / Turn Of The Century (with Andy Boay)	Released: April 22, 2014 (Worldwide); Label: Hausu Mountain; Formats: Cassette, digital download

==== Remix albums ====
List of remix albums with details
Title	Album details
Big Pop Traveler's Delight	Released: December 24, 2014 (Japan); Label: birdFriend; Formats: Cassette, digital download

==== Singles ====
===== As featured artist =====
List of singles as featured artist, showing year released and album name
Title	Year	Album
"Gotta Know" (Kari Faux featuring Jerry Paper)	2017	Primary

==== Music videos ====
List of music videos, with director
Title	Year	Director
"Chameleon World"	2014	Misha Spivack, Hunter Steinman
"Real. Now. Love."	2015	Campbell Logan
"Kno Me"	2022	Alan Resnick
"Just Say Play"	2022	Dan Streit
"Duumb"	2022	Steve Smith

=== As Zonotope™ ===
==== Studio albums ====
List of studio albums with details
Title	Album details
Excellent Realms	Released: November 9, 2010 (Worldwide); Label: The Curatorial Club; Formats: Cassette, digital download
Zero Gravity	Released: January 3, 2011 (Worldwide); Label: Hobo Cult; Formats: Cassette, digital download
Human Unity	Released: October 12, 2011 (Worldwide); Label: Ruralfaune Synth Series; Formats: CD, digital download
MAINFRAME'S Tetralogy	Released: December 21, 2012 (Worldwide); Label: Dœs Are; Formats: Cassette, digital download

==== Extended plays ====
List of extended plays with details
Title	Album details
Cruising Through the Hypersphere of Resonance	Released: July 21, 2010 (Worldwide); Label: Self-released; Formats: Digital download

==== Split albums ====
List of split albums with details
Title	Album details
I Fell in Love With a Cyborg (with Panabrite)	Released: July 15, 2011 (Worldwide); Label: MABA Tapes; Formats: Cassette, digital download

==== Reissue albums ====
List of reissue albums with details
Title	Album details
MAINFRAME'S Tetralogy	Released: July 1, 2015 (Worldwide); Label: Samling; Formats: Cassette, digital download

=== As Diane Kensington Devotional Band ===
==== Studio albums ====
List of studio albums with details
Title	Album details
Worship and Festival Music for MAINFRAME Devotees Vol. 37	Released: July 15, 2011 (Worldwide); Label: Self-released; Formats: Cassette, digital download
34 Wordless Mantras For Augmented Ascension Meditation And Silencing Your Inner Monologue	Released: February 23, 2012 (Worldwide); Label: Self-released; Formats: Cassette, digital download

==== Extended plays ====
List of extended plays with details
Title	Album details
...And Her Ministry of Digital Devotees	Released: September 30, 2011 (Worldwide); Label: Self-released; Formats: Digital download
