= Wild Nothing =

American indie rock and dream pop band

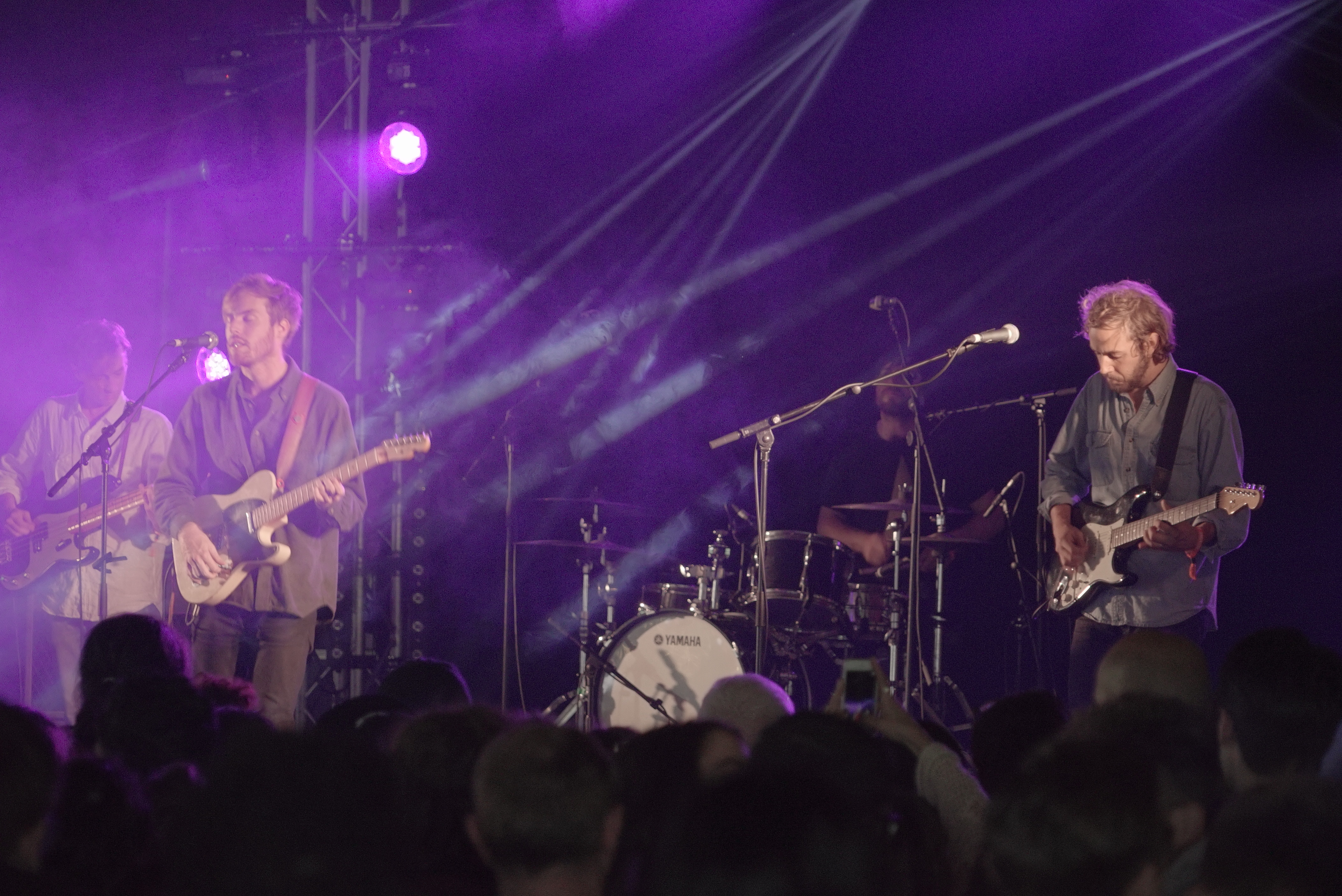
- Wild Nothing performing in 2016

Background information
- Origin: Blacksburg, Virginia, United States
- Genres: Indie rock; dream pop; chillwave; synth-pop; new wave; shoegaze; post-punk revival
- Years active: 2009–present
- Label: Captured Tracks
- Members: Jack Tatum
- Website: wildnothingmusic.com

Wild Nothing is the indie rock project of American multi-instrumentalist Jack Tatum, formed in 2009 in Blacksburg, Virginia. In the recording studio, Tatum writes, records and performs the project's music. As a touring act, Wild Nothing performs as a full band. The current lineup features longtime bass guitarist Jeff Haley, guitarist Christoph Hochheim, keyboardist Lou Rebecca, and rotating live/touring drummers.

To date, Wild Nothing has released five studio albums: Gemini (2010), Nocturne (2012), Life of Pause (2016), Indigo (2018) and Hold (2023), as well as four EPs: Evertide (2010), Golden Haze (2010), Empty Estate (2013) and Laughing Gas (2020).

Tatum has also production and writing credits on songs such as Japanese Breakfast's "Be Sweet" and Molly Burch's Emotion.

== History ==
=== Gemini & Golden Haze EP (2009–2011) ===
Jack Alexander Tatum (born June 10, 1988) previously played in bands Jack and the Whale and FACEPAINT in the college town of Blacksburg. He began recording under the name Wild Nothing in the summer of 2009. Emerging at a time when a handful of C86-esque groups were in vogue, Tatum's demos garnered attention in indie music circles with a cover of Kate Bush's "Cloudbusting". Tatum signed with the Captured Tracks record label after the success of these demos, and began touring with Haley, Goodman and drummer Max Brooks.

Wild Nothing's first single, "Summer Holiday", was released on Captured Tracks in 2009, followed by "Cloudbusting." The band's debut album, Gemini, was released on May 25, 2010. Gemini was ranked the 49th best album of 2010 by Pitchfork and 36th best album of 2010 by Amazon music editors. Blogcritics wrote, "While I wasn't totally convinced with Gemini as a whole, I adored it in chunks".

A follow-up EP, Golden Haze, was released on October 12, 2010.

=== Nocturne & Empty Estate EP (2012–2013) ===
Wild Nothing released their second album, Nocturne, on August 28, 2012, via Captured Tracks. The album was well received critically and commercially, debuting at No. 1 on both the Billboard New Artist and Alternative New Artist charts, receiving "Best New Music" from Pitchfork, and receiving top slots on the year-end lists of Under the Radar and iTunes Alternative.

Wild Nothing's third EP, Empty Estate, was released on May 14, 2013.

=== Life of Pause (2014–2016) ===
On October 7, 2014, Wild Nothing announced the production of their third studio album. On January 6, 2015, Tatum announced that he was en route to Stockholm to begin recording. In the same year, they were featured in the shoegaze documentary, Beautiful Noise.

On November 24, 2015, Wild Nothing announced their third studio album, Life of Pause, would be released on February 19, 2016, on Captured Tracks. A double-sided single, "To Know You" / "TV Queen", was released the same day, with accompanying music videos for both tracks.

=== Indigo & Laughing Gas EP (2018–2020) ===
Wild Nothing announced their fourth studio album, Indigo, alongside the first single, "Letting Go", on June 5, 2018. The album was released on August 31, 2018.

On January 16, 2019, their single "Blue Wings" was released. The following year, Wild Nothing also announced that "Foyer" would be out on January 1, 2020, followed by the Laughing Gas EP.

=== Hold (2023–present) ===
On August 16, 2023, Wild Nothing announced that their fifth studio album, Hold, would be released on October 27, 2023. A single, "Headlights On", featuring guest vocals from Hatchie, was released to coincide with the announcement, accompanied by a video. The album's second single, "Suburban Solutions", was released on September 12, 2023, also accompanied by a video. A third single, "Dial Tone", was released on October 3, 2023; like the two preceding singles, it too was accompanied by a video. Hold was released on October 27, 2023, to mostly positive reviews.

== Lineup ==
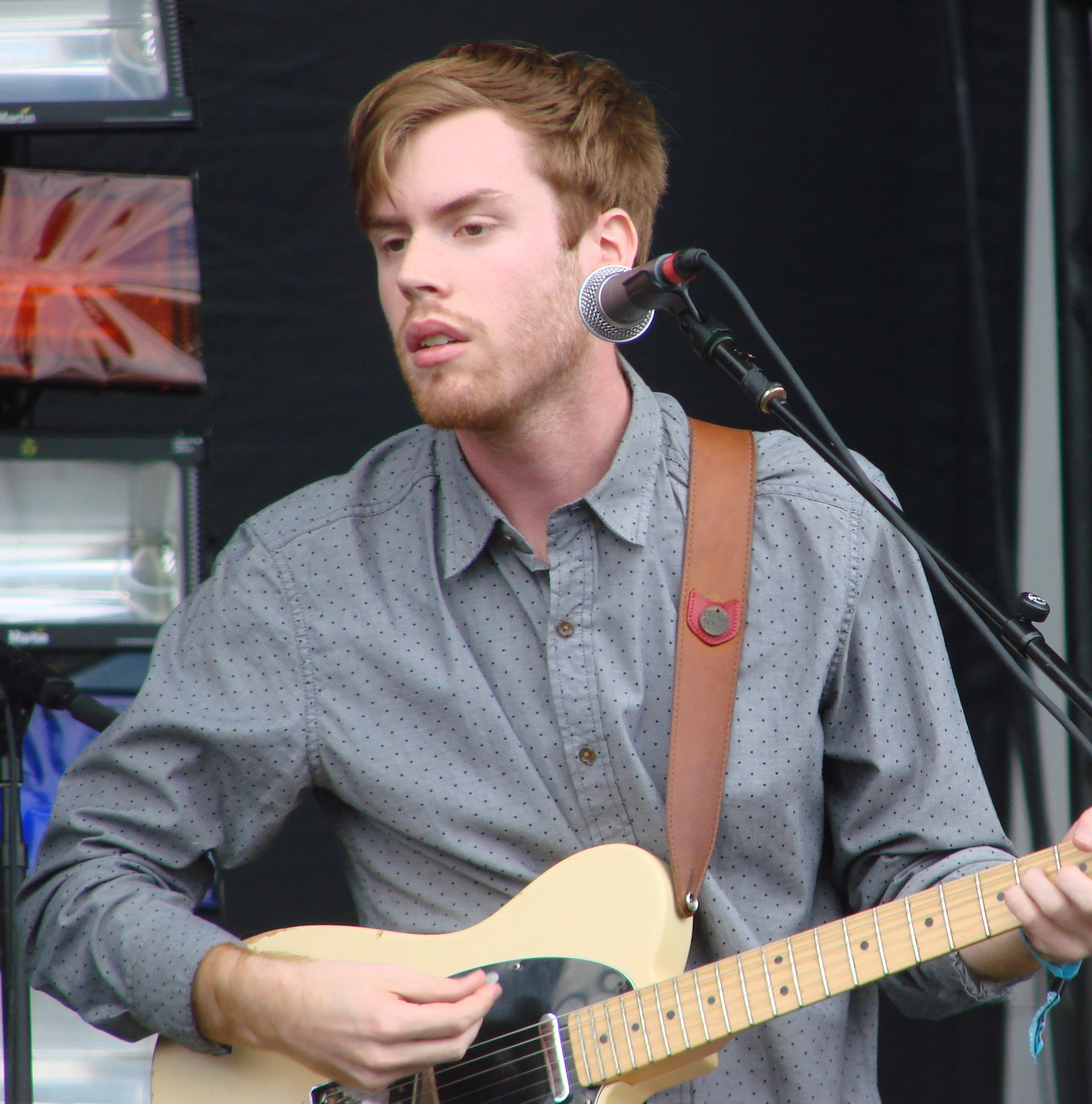
Lead singer and founder, Jack Tatum, live at the Governors Ball Music Festival in New York City on June 8, 2013

Founding member and songwriter Tatum records Wild Nothing's albums and EPs alone, and is subsequently joined by the other members for live performances. In 2013, he stated: "I'm not really sure what we are at this point. It's a weird gray area. On the road, it definitely feels like a band; the live show's all about how we individually interpret the songs I made – there's five different takes on them. But the records are all me. Gemini was all me, and so was Nocturne, save for the drums".

Current

- Jeff Haley – bass guitar (2011–present)
- Christoph Hochheim – guitar (2021–present)
- Lou Rebecca – keyboards (2023–present)

Former

- Clay Violand - bass guitar (2010–2011)
- Max Brooks – drums (2010)
- Nathan Goodman – guitar (2010–2017)
- Michael Skattum – drums (2011–2012)
- Jeremiah Johnson – drums (2012–2013)
- Kevin Knight – keyboards (2012–2013)
- Matt Kallman – keyboards (2016)
- Colin Caulfield – keyboards (2017)
- Elroy Finn – drums (2018–2019)
- Victor Donahue – drums (2023–2024)
- Pete Chudzick – drums
- Nic Hessler – guitar
- Cameron Allen – drums
- Joshua Sushman – keyboards/saxophone

== Discography ==
=== Studio albums ===
List of studio albums with selected chart positions
Title	Album details	Peak chart positions						
Title	Album details	US	US Alt.	US Heat.	US Indie	US Rock	BEL (Fla.)	BEL (Fla.) Alt.
Gemini	Released: May 25, 2010; Label: Captured Tracks; Format: CD, LP, download, cassette	—	—	—	—	—	—	—
Nocturne	Released: August 28, 2012; Label: Captured Tracks; Format: CD, LP, download, cassette	113	23	1	21	34	—	23
Life of Pause	Released: February 19, 2016; Label: Captured Tracks; Format: CD, LP, download, cassette	170	16	2	10	23	195	—
Indigo	Released: August 31, 2018; Label: Captured Tracks; Format: CD, LP, download, cassette	—	—	2	15	—	—	—
Hold	Released: October 27, 2023; Label: Captured Tracks; Format: CD, LP, download, cassette	—	—	—	—	—	—	—
"—" denotes releases that did not chart or were not released in that territory.

=== Live albums ===
List of extended plays with selected chart positions
Title	EP details	Peak chart positions	
Title	EP details	US Heat.	US Indie
Live from Brooklyn Steel	Released: September 27, 2019; Label: Captured Tracks; Format: download	—	—
"—" denotes releases that did not chart or were not released in that territory.

=== EPs ===
List of extended plays with selected chart positions
Title	EP details	Peak chart positions	
Title	EP details	US Heat.	US Indie
Evertide	Released: June 26, 2010; Label: Warmest Chord; Format: download	—	—
Golden Haze	Released: October 13, 2010; Label: Captured Tracks; Format: CD, LP, download	—	—
Empty Estate	Released: May 14, 2013; Label: Captured Tracks; Format: CD, LP, download	8	41
Laughing Gas	Released: February 7, 2020; Label: Captured Tracks; Format: CD, LP, download	—	
"—" denotes releases that did not chart or were not released in that territory.

=== Singles ===
- "Summer Holiday" - Gemini (2009, Captured Tracks)
- "Cloudbusting" - non-album single (2009, Captured Tracks)
- "Nowhere" - non-album single (2012, Captured Tracks)
- "Shadow" - Nocturne (2012, Captured Tracks)
- "Paradise" - Nocturne (2012, Captured Tracks)
- "A Dancing Shell" - Empty Estate EP (2013, Captured Tracks)
- "To Know You" - Life of Pause (2015, Captured Tracks)
- "TV Queen" - Life of Pause (2015, Captured Tracks)
- "Reichpop" - Life of Pause (2016, Captured Tracks)
- "Life of Pause" - Life of Pause (2016, Captured Tracks)
- "A Woman's Wisdom" - Life of Pause (2016, Captured Tracks)
- "Letting Go" - Indigo (2018, Captured Tracks)
- "Partners in Motion" - Indigo (2018, Captured Tracks)
- "Shallow Water" - Indigo (2018, Captured Tracks)
- "Canyon on Fire" - Indigo (2018, Captured Tracks)
- "Blue Wings" - Laughing Gas EP (2019, Captured Tracks)
- "Foyer" - Laughing Gas EP (2020, Captured Tracks)
- "Headlights On" - Hold (2023, Captured Tracks)
- "Suburban Solutions" - Hold (2023, Captured Tracks)
- "Dial Tone" - Hold (2023, Captured Tracks)
