= Gemini (Wild Nothing album) =

Album by Wild Nothing

Studio album by Wild Nothing
- Released: May 25, 2010
- Genres: Dream pop; indie pop
- Length: 42:37
- Label: Captured Tracks
- Producer: Wild Nothing

Wild Nothing chronology
Gemini (2010)	Golden Haze (2010)

Gemini is the debut album by American indie rock act Wild Nothing, released on May 25, 2010, by Captured Tracks.

== Critical reception ==
Professional ratings
Aggregate scores
Source	Rating
AnyDecentMusic?	7.6/10
Review scores
Source	Rating
AllMusic	4/5 stars
Clash	7/10
Consequence of Sound	4/5 stars
The Irish Times	4/5 stars
Pitchfork	8.2/10
PopMatters	7/10

Gemini received largely positive reviews from contemporary music critics. Ian Cohen of Pitchfork praised the album, stating, "Wild Nothing doesn't feel like a facile genre exercise so much as honest personal expression borne of intense musical fanhood. And in a strange way, it becomes something of a deceptively joyous affair, a reminder of why so many songwriters retreat to bedrooms or garages to lose themselves in the music-making process." AllMusic critic Tim Sendra drew comparisons to OMD, Cocteau Twins, New Order and Echo & the Bunnymen, adding that "the melodies are so strong and [Jack] Tatum's ability to create a mood of quiet desperation is so perfectly calibrated that you wouldn't want to change a thing sound-wise."

Stereogum named Gemini the ninth best album of 2010. Pitchfork placed Gemini at number 49 on its year-end best albums list, while the track "Chinatown" placed at number 73 on its year-end best tracks list. In 2018, the site also listed Gemini at number 25 on its list of the 30 best dream pop albums.

== Track listing ==
All tracks are written by Jack Tatum.

No.	Title	Length
1.	"Live in Dreams"	3:25
2.	"Summer Holiday"	4:02
3.	"Drifter"	3:33
4.	"Pessimist"	1:47
5.	"O, Lilac"	3:02
6.	"Bored Games"	4:00
7.	"Confirmation"	3:13
8.	"My Angel Lonely"	2:58
9.	"The Witching Hour"	4:07
10.	"Chinatown"	3:18
11.	"Our Composition Book"	3:47
12.	"Gemini"	5:25
Total length:		42:37
