= Mac DeMarco discography =

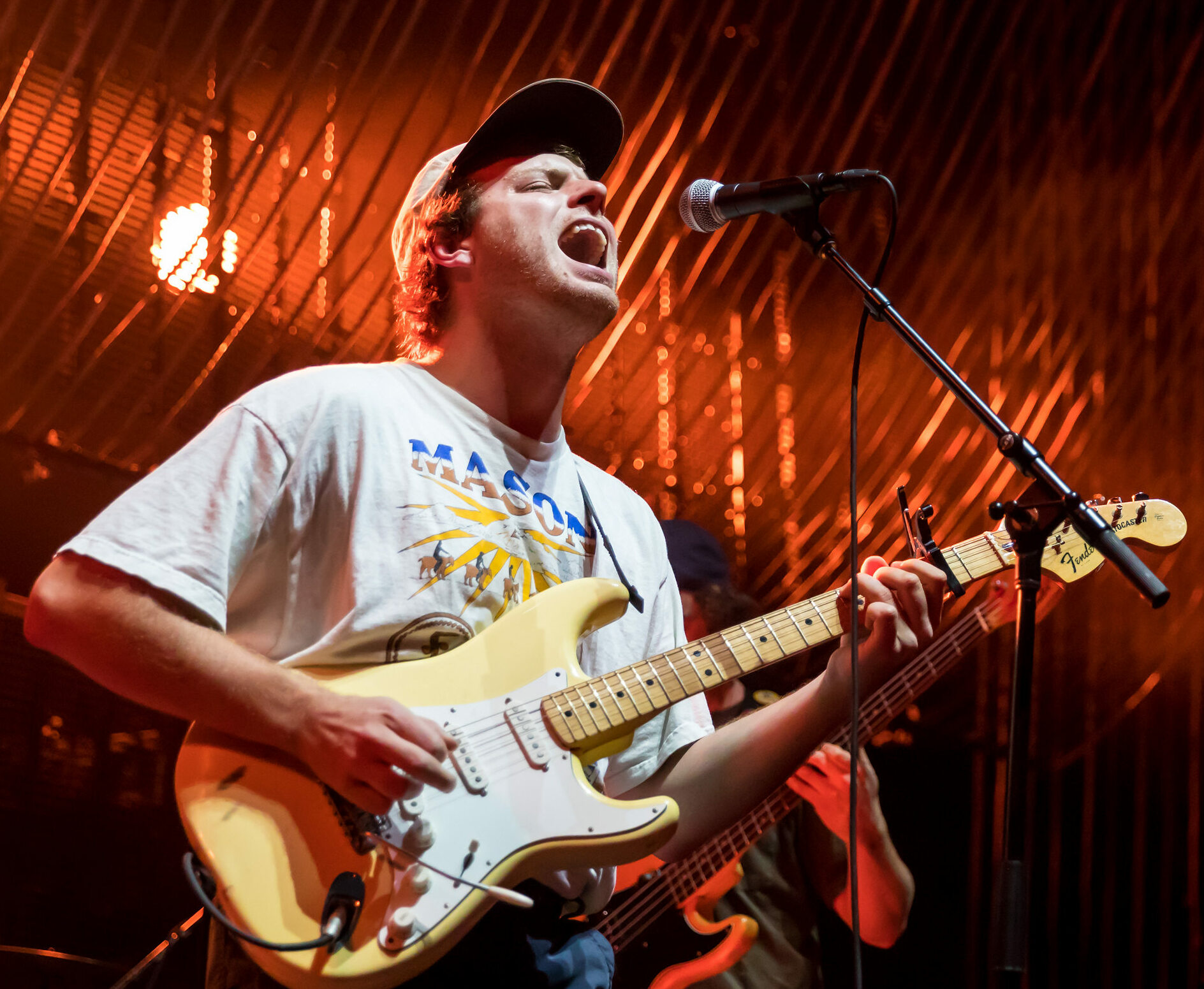
- DeMarco performing at Austin City Limits in Texas (2017)
- Studio albums: 6
- EPs: 5
- Live albums: 2
- Compilation albums: 3
- Singles: 3
- Music videos: 17
- Mini-LPs: 1

Canadian singer-songwriter Mac DeMarco has released six studio albums, two live albums, three compilation albums, five extended plays (EPs), three singles, and 17 music videos. DeMarco was in several bands in high school until he graduated in 2008. In 2009, he released his debut EP, Heat Wave, under the name Makeout Videotape. The EP sold out its 500-unit run. DeMarco was joined by Alex Calder and Jen Clement, and Makeout Videotape was signed to Unfamiliar Records. Heat Wave was followed by two EPs, Eating Like a Kid and Bossa Yeye, one studio album, Ying Yang, one single Weird Meats and one compilation album Eyeballing, all of them released between February 2010 and May 2011.

In 2012, DeMarco went back to recording as a solo artist and was signed by Captured Tracks. They released his EP Rock and Roll Night Club in early 2012; it received positive reviews from contemporary music critics. His second studio album, 2, followed later the same year. 2 was met with critical acclaim and peaked at number 26 on the Billboard Heatseekers chart. It was followed by DeMarco's third studio album, Salad Days in 2014. Salad Days was also praised by critics and peaked at number 90 on the UK Albums Chart, and number 30 on the Billboard 200. DeMarco released an EP titled Some Other Ones and the mini-LP Another One in the summer of 2015. Another One was met with positive reviews and peaked at number 24 on the UK Albums Chart. In the United States, it peaked at number 25 on the Billboard 200, selling 13,000 copies in its first week. This Old Dog, DeMarco's fourth album, was released in the summer of 2017 to critical acclaim.

== Albums ==
=== Studio albums ===
Title	Album details	Peak chart positions										Sales	Certifications
Title	Album details	CAN	AUS	BEL (FL)	BEL (WA)	FRA	IRE	NLD	SCO	UK	US	Sales	Certifications
Ying Yang^{MV}	Released: December 13, 2010 (Worldwide); Label: self-released; Formats: LP, Cassette, Digital download; Note: The initial release of the album were CD-R copies given to friends in December 13, 2010. The cassette and complete digital format were released in 2011 while the LP format was a re-issue done by the label Thursday/Friday and released on August 20, 2015.	—	—	—	—	—	—	—	—	—	—		
2	Released: October 16, 2012 (US); Label: Captured Tracks; Formats: Cassette, Digital download, CD, LP	—	—	—	—	—	—	—	—	—	— (Note: 2 did not enter the Billboard 200; however, it peaked at number 26 on the US Top Heatseekers chart.)		RIAA: Gold; RMNZ: Gold
Salad Days	Released: March 28, 2014 (Germany); Label: Captured Tracks; Formats: Digital download, CD, LP, cassette	—	—	94	147	—	—	—	—	90	30	US: 51,000	BPI: Silver; RIAA: Gold; RMNZ: Gold
This Old Dog	Released: May 5, 2017 (Worldwide); Label: Captured Tracks; Formats: Digital download, CD, LP, cassette	27	23	72	75	144	14	48	19	21	29		RIAA: Platinum; BPI: Gold; RMNZ: Gold
Here Comes the Cowboy	Released: May 10, 2019; Label: Mac's Record Label; Formats: Digital download, CD, LP, cassette	24	25	22	98	112	37	42	15	23	10	US: 20,000	
Five Easy Hot Dogs	Released: January 20, 2023; Label: Mac's Record Label; Formats: LP, CD, Digital download, streaming	—	—	169	—	—	—	—	—	—	—		
One Wayne G	Released: April 21, 2023; Label: Mac's Record Label; Formats: Digital download, streaming, Blu-ray	38	—	—	—	158	—	—	—	—	56		
Guitar	Released: August 22, 2025; Label: Mac's Record Label; Formats: LP, CD, digital download, streaming	—	—	173	—	—	—	—	24	—	173		
"—" denotes a recording that did not chart or was not released in that territory.

=== Live albums ===
Title	Album details
Live at Russian Recording	Released: July 23, 2013 (US); Label: Jurassic Pop; Formats: Cassette
Live and Acoustic Vol. 1	Released: November 8, 2013 (US); Label: Captured Tracks; Formats: Digital download, cassette

=== Mini-LPs ===
Title	Album details	Peak chart positions										Sales
Title	Album details	AUS	BEL (Fla.)	FRA	IRE	UK	US	US Alt.	US Indie	US Rock	US Taste	Sales
Another One	Released: August 7, 2015 (Worldwide); Label: Captured Tracks; Format: Digital download, CD, Mini-LP, cassette	24	120	124	56	24	25	1	1	1	2	US: 13,000 (Note: United States sales figures for Another One as of August 2015.)

=== Compilation albums ===
Title	Album details
Eyeballing^{MV}	Released: May 5, 2011 (Worldwide); Label: self-released; Formats: Digital download; Note: The Bandcamp page states the release of this album was on November 2, 2010 but this is not the case. The album was released on May 5th, 2011 as indicated by the community tab. Furthermore, Web Archive pages from early 2011 has the Bandcamp's page including only the first test release of Ying Yang.
2 Demos	Released: August 31, 2013 (US); Label: Captured Tracks; Formats: LP, Digital download, cassette
Salad Days Demos	Released: June 17, 2014 (US); Label: Captured Tracks; Formats: LP, Cassette, Digital download
Another (Demo) One	Released: April 16, 2016 (US); Label: Captured Tracks; Formats: LP, cassette
Old Dog Demos	Released: April 21, 2018 (US); Label: Captured Tracks; Formats: LP, cassette
Here Comes the Cowboy Demos	Released: August 28, 2020 (US); Label: Mac's Record Label; Formats: LP, Digital download
Other Here Comes the Cowboy Demos	Released: August 29, 2020 (US); Label: Mac's Record Label; Formats: LP, Digital download

== EPs ==
Title	EP details
Heat Wave!^{MV}	Released: April 30, 2009 (Canada); Label: self-released; Formats: Digital download, CD-R; Note: The digital format of the album was released on March 15, 2011 as indicated by Makeout Videotape's Bandcamp community tab.
Eating Like a Kid^{MV}	Released: March, 2010 (Canada); Label: self-released; Formats: Digital download, CD-R; Note: The digital format of the album was released on March 15, 2011 as indicated by Makeout Videotape's Bandcamp community tab.
Bossa Yeye^{MV}	Released: March 16, 2010 (Worldwide); Label: self-released; Formats: Digital download; Note: The Bandcamp page states the release of this album was on November 1, 2010 but this is not the case. The album was released on March 16, 2011 as indicated by the community tab. Furthermore, Web Archive pages from early 2011 has the Bandcamp's page including only the first test release of Ying Yang.
Rock and Roll Night Club	Released: March 13, 2012 (US); Label: Captured Tracks; Formats: Digital download, CD, LP, Cassette
Some Other Ones	Released: July 8, 2015 (Worldwide); Label: self-released; Formats: Digital download, LP

== Singles ==
=== As lead artist ===
Title	Year	Certifications	Album
"Only You"	2012		Rock and Roll Night Club
"My Kind of Woman"	2012	BPI: Gold; RIAA: 3× Platinum; RMNZ: Platinum	2
"Young Blood"	2013		Non-album singles
"Honey Moon"	2018		Non-album singles
"Simply Paradise" (with Ryan Paris)	2023		Non-album singles

=== As featured artist ===
Title	Year	Album
"Nudista Mundial '89" (Alan Palomo featuring Mac De Marco)	2023	World of Hassle

=== Promotional singles ===
Title	Year	Peak chart positions		Certifications	Album
Title	Year	BEL	US Rock	Certifications	Album
"My Old Man"	2017	—	—		This Old Dog
"This Old Dog"	2017	—	—		This Old Dog
"On the Level"	2017	—	—	RIAA: Gold	This Old Dog
"One More Love Song"	2017	—	—	RIAA: Gold	This Old Dog
"Nobody"	2019	111	46		Here Comes the Cowboy
"All of Our Yesterdays"	2019	—	—		Here Comes the Cowboy
"On the Square"	2019	—	44		Here Comes the Cowboy

== Other charted and certified songs ==
Title	Year	Peak chart positions				Certifications	Album
Title	Year	US	US Rock	LIT	WW	Certifications	Album
"Freaking Out the Neighborhood"	2012	—	—	—	—	BPI: Gold; RIAA: Platinum; RMNZ: Platinum	2
"Chamber of Reflection"	2014	—	—	—	—	BPI: Platinum; RIAA: 2× Platinum; RMNZ: Platinum	Salad Days
"Salad Days"	2014	—	—	—	—	RIAA: Gold; RMNZ: Gold	Salad Days
"For the First Time"	2017	—	—	—	—	RIAA: 3× Platinum; MC: Platinum; RMNZ: Platinum	This Old Dog
"Still Beating"	2017	—	—	—	—	BPI: Silver; RIAA: Gold; RMNZ: Gold	This Old Dog
"Moonlight on the River"	2017	—	—	—	—	RIAA: Platinum; RMNZ: Gold	This Old Dog
"On the Square"	2019	—	44	—	—		Here Comes the Cowboy
"Heart to Heart"	2019	83	7	68	184	BPI: Silver; MC: Platinum; RIAA: 2× Platinum; RMNZ: Platinum	Here Comes the Cowboy
"20191009 I Like Her"	2023	—	—	—	—	RIAA: Gold	One Wayne G

== Other Appearances ==
Year	Album	Comment
2013	Taste of Savage: His Pupils Sing His Music	A tribute album to Canadian musician Sean Nicholas Savage, on which Mac covered Savage's song "Bye Bye Bye".
2021	The Metallica Blacklist	A track-for-track tribute to Metallica's self-titled album. Mac performs a cover of "Enter Sandman".

== Music videos ==
Title	Year	Director
"Exercising with My Demons"	2011	Evan Prosofsky
"Only You"	2012	Evan Prosofsky
"She's Really All I Need"	2012	Pierce McGarry
"European Vegas"	2012	Angus Borsos
"Rock and Roll Night Club"	2012	Jason Harvey
"Ode to Viceroy"	2012	Jasper Baydala
"Dreamin'"	2013	Jason Harvey
"My Kind of Woman"	2013	Alex Lill
"Passing Out Pieces"	2014	Pierce McGarry
"Chamber of Reflection"	2014	Unknown
"This Guy's in Love with You"	2014	Unknown
"Another One"	2015	Mac DeMarco
"I Was a Fool to Care"	2016	Unknown
"It's Gonna Be Lonely"	2016	Jim Larson
"This Old Dog" (video 1)	2017	Mac DeMarco
"One Another"	2017	Pierce McGarry
"This Old Dog" (video 2)	2017	Rachel Rossin
"On the Square"	2019	William Sipos & Sean Campos

== Explanatory notes ==
^MVReleased as Makeout Videotape
