= Another One =

Another One may refer to:

== Albums ==
- Another One (Mac DeMarco album), 2015
- Another One (Oscar Pettiford album), 1955

== Songs ==
- "Another One", by Conor Maynard from the album Contrast
- "Another One", by Brett Kissel from Let Your Horses Run – The Album
- "Another One", by dvsn from the album Sept. 5th
- "Another One", by Kim Petras from the project Clarity
- "Another One", by Mac DeMarco from the album Another One
- "Another One", by Oscar Pettiford from the album Another One
- "Another One", by Remy Ma
- "Another One", by Sam Smith from the album Love Goes
- "Another One", by SoFaygo from the album Pink Heartz
- "I Told You / Another One", by Tory Lanez from the album I Told You
