= Mac's Record Label =

American independent record label

- Founded: August 8, 2018
- Founder: Mac DeMarco
- Distributor: Caroline International (Universal Music Group)
- Genre: Indie rock, indie pop, slacker rock, psychedelic pop
- Country of origin: United States
- Location: Los Angeles, California
- Official website: https://shop.macdemarco.com

Mac's Record Label is an American independent record label founded in August 2018 by the Canadian musician Mac DeMarco. The label was DeMarco's first venture outside Captured Tracks, the Brooklyn independent that had released all of his music since 2012, and it is distributed by Caroline International, a division of Universal Music Group.

The label's first release was DeMarco's fourth studio album, Here Comes the Cowboy (2019), which became his first top-ten album in the United States when it debuted at number 10 on the Billboard 200. Since then the label has issued the majority of DeMarco's catalogue, including several demo collections and archival releases, and has signed a small roster of other artists, beginning with the Australian musician Tex Crick in 2021.

== History ==
=== 2018: Founding ===
DeMarco announced the label on 8 August 2018 with a typically brief statement: "Hi, it's Mac. We're starting a record label; it's called 'Mac's Record Label.' My friend Jen who plays drums in The Courtneys gave me the name." The friend was Jen Twynn Payne, who had previously played drums in DeMarco's earlier project Makeout Videotape. The announcement was made alongside DeMarco's first-ever solo tour, the "Purple Bobcat Next to River Tour", and the label was launched with global distribution through Caroline. Its logo is a yellow square bearing a simple smiley face.

DeMarco framed the label as a matter of ownership rather than of signing new acts. He told Billboard that the venture was "not an attempt to sign indie music's promising up-and-comers" but "a practical step toward one key personal objective: 'own everything.'" He was explicit that the arrangement was not a return to DIY: "It's not like I bought a tape duplicator and I'm starting a label in my garage," he said. "It's a very different beast." With distribution provided by the world's largest record company, he said, "I own a little more of what I create, which has always been appealing to me." The New Yorker later summarised that DeMarco founded the label because he wanted control over his work. He also used the platform to warn younger artists against the industry contracts he had avoided: "Do not sign a 360 deal. I don't care how much money they're offering you."

=== 2019: Here Comes the Cowboy ===
The label's first release was Here Comes the Cowboy, issued on 10 May 2019 and released in Canada through Royal Mountain Records. DeMarco wrote, tracked and mixed the record at his Jizz Jazz Studios in Los Angeles over the first two weeks of an exceptionally rainy January 2019, playing nearly every instrument himself aside from keyboards from touring member Alec Meen, with engineer Joe Santarpia sharing mixing duties. The album debuted at number 10 on the Billboard 200 with nearly 27,000 album-equivalent units, of which 20,000 were pure album sales, becoming his first US top-ten album.

=== 2020: Demo collections ===
In 2020 the label released two companion collections drawn from the Here Comes the Cowboy sessions. Here Comes the Cowboy Demos, featuring demo versions of the album's tracks, arrived on 28 August 2020, and Other Here Comes the Cowboy Demos, a collection of alternate and unreleased recordings, followed the next day as a Record Store Day exclusive on purple vinyl, limited to 3,000 copies. Both releases had been scheduled for April 2020 and were postponed by the COVID-19 pandemic.

=== 2021–present: Roster and later releases ===
In January 2021 the label announced its first signing besides DeMarco: Tex Crick, an Australian songwriter whose debut album Live In… New York City was released on 26 March 2021. Crick, a former collaborator of Iggy Pop, Weyes Blood, Kirin J. Callinan and Connan Mockasin, had recorded the album on an eight-track in his New York apartment; DeMarco met him on tour with Mockasin and offered to mix the record at his home studio in Los Angeles. "I've always loved the music he's sent me," DeMarco said. "I helped mix this record, and have heard it probably one thousand times at this point, and still love it." He released two further albums through the label, Sweet Dreamin' (2023) and Droplet (2024).

Vicky Farewell, a singer and producer from Garden Grove, California, who had worked with DeMarco, Mild High Club and Anderson .Paak, followed with her debut album Sweet Company on 8 April 2022, which she produced, arranged and engineered herself. A second album, Give a Damn, arrived on 10 May 2024, again written and produced from her apartment. DeMarco's longtime collaborator Daryl Johns joined in April 2023, releasing the single "Gabriel".

In 2024 the label signed Mock Media, an art-punk quartet from North Okanagan, British Columbia, whose members have played in Pottery, Crack Cloud, NOV3L and Painted Fruit, and reissued their debut album Mock Media II in North and South America that December. Their second album, Rat Bastard, followed on 17 July 2026, released by the label in the same territories and supported by a run of North American shows opening for DeMarco.

DeMarco's own releases on the label in this period include the instrumental Five Easy Hot Dogs, recorded during a road trip, and the 199-track archival collection One Wayne G, both in 2023. In November 2023 the label also gave a first wide release to Some Other Ones, a 2015 instrumental set DeMarco had originally issued as a free "BBQ soundtrack", bringing it to streaming services and to a limited yellow vinyl pressing. Guitar followed in 2025.

In August 2026 the label released four further DeMarco albums that had previously circulated only as CD-Rs handed out at his concerts: Dog on the Rock, Seven Off the Two, Seaplane Dog and The View From Tian Tan. Exclaim! noted that the four collections contain 47 songs between them, mostly titled with recording dates, and that they had been distributed at individual tour dates before the streaming release. Stereogum described the label as having been "the home of all his music since 2019's Here Comes the Cowboy".

== Artists ==
Artists who have released music on the label include:

- Mac DeMarco
- Tex Crick
- Vicky Farewell
- Daryl Johns
- Mock Media

== Discography ==
| Year | Artist | Title | Notes |
|---|---|---|---|
| 2019 | Mac DeMarco | Here Comes the Cowboy | Debut release on the label; US number 10 |
| 2020 | Mac DeMarco | Here Comes the Cowboy Demos | Demo versions from the Here Comes the Cowboy sessions |
| 2020 | Mac DeMarco | Other Here Comes the Cowboy Demos | Record Store Day exclusive, limited to 3,000 copies |
| 2021 | Tex Crick | Live In… New York City | First non-DeMarco signing; mixed by DeMarco |
| 2023 | Tex Crick | Sweet Dreamin' | Second album |
| 2024 | Tex Crick | Droplet | Third album |
| 2022 | Vicky Farewell | Sweet Company | Debut album |
| 2023 | Mac DeMarco | Five Easy Hot Dogs | Instrumental album |
| 2023 | Mac DeMarco | One Wayne G | 199-track archival collection |
| 2023 | Daryl Johns | "Gabriel" | Single |
| 2023 | Mac DeMarco | Some Other Ones | First wide release of the 2015 instrumental set |
| 2024 | Vicky Farewell | Give a Damn | Second album |
| 2024 | Mock Media | Mock Media II | North and South American reissue of the band's debut |
| 2025 | Mac DeMarco | Guitar | Sixth studio album |
| 2026 | Mac DeMarco | Dog on the Rock | Tour-only CD-R, released to streaming in August 2026 |
| 2026 | Mac DeMarco | Seven Off the Two | Tour-only CD-R, released to streaming in August 2026 |
| 2026 | Mac DeMarco | Seaplane Dog | Tour-only CD-R, released to streaming in August 2026 |
| 2026 | Mac DeMarco | The View From Tian Tan | Tour-only CD-R, released to streaming in August 2026 |
| 2026 | Mock Media | Rat Bastard | Released 17 July 2026 |
