= Ying Yang (album) =

2010 album by Makeout Videotape

Studio album by Makeout Videotape
- Released: 13 December 2010
- Recorded: 2010
- Studios: Vancouver and Edmonton, Canada
- Genres: Lo-fi; garage pop; slacker rock
- Length: 32:48
- Labels: Self-released; Totally Disconnected (cassette); Thursday Friday (2015 reissue)

2015 reissue cover
- Artwork used for the Thursday Friday vinyl reissue

Ying Yang is the debut studio album by the Canadian lo-fi project Makeout Videotape, a duo of Mac DeMarco and Alex Calder. It was released on 13 December 2010 as a surprise download, at first as a six-track set posted to Bandcamp and then as a 13-track version that DeMarco sent to listeners by email. A cassette edition followed in 2011, and the album was reissued on vinyl in 2015.

Ying Yang was made at home on an eight-track recorder by DeMarco and Calder, and was little reviewed on its release. Its song "Only You" later appeared as a bonus track on DeMarco's first solo album, Rock and Roll Night Club (2012), where it drew more attention than the album had.

== Background ==
Makeout Videotape were signed to the Toronto independent label Unfamiliar Records at the end of 2009, when a full-length debut was first announced. The project paired DeMarco, who wrote and sang, with Calder on drums; the two had played together since they were teenagers in Edmonton, and had spent the previous year in Vancouver. After a summer 2010 tour, DeMarco returned to his mother's house: "We didn't make very much money and I was just broke and tired, so I came back and lived at my mom's house for a while and didn't do much of anything", he said. "I just felt like telling the Internet we didn't die."

DeMarco said much of the material from this period was written about his bandmate. Listing what he wrote songs about, he told an interviewer: "I write a lot of songs about Alex too. He's having a rough time in his life right now."

== Recording ==
The album was recorded in 2010 in Vancouver and Edmonton. DeMarco made it on a Fostex VF-80 eight-track recorder with built-in effects, the machine on which most of the project's earlier recordings had been made; he had used a Tascam 244 for the EP Eating Like a Kid earlier in the year, and returned to it for Rock and Roll Night Club. The project's drum setup at the time consisted of a single floor tom and a snare, and the pair recorded wherever they could rather than in a studio.

DeMarco described the rough fidelity as a deliberate choice rather than a limitation. Having spent time on clean recordings with earlier bands, he concluded that he "could write this really good song and record it really shitty", and found that audiences responded to the rough versions faster. The recordings were informed by Jonathan Richman, Arthur Russell, the Beatles and Harry Nilsson.

== Release and versions ==
Ying Yang appeared without warning on 13 December 2010. The first version, posted to Bandcamp, ran to six songs and was offered for a donation of four dollars or more. A longer 13-track version circulated separately, at first among DeMarco's friends and then to anyone who emailed him to ask for it. DeMarco said the split was accidental: "With Bandcamp, I just uploaded those ones and people started saying, 'EP? Full-length?' I was like, 'Ah, whatever.'" Contemporaries noted that the record was cleaner than the project's earlier work, with the vocals and hooks more distinct.

A cassette edition followed on the Vancouver label Totally Disconnected, which described the release as the project's debut cassette. By March 2011 DeMarco was already tired of it. "We [just independently] released Ying Yang on a cassette. We might release it with our label on vinyl", he said. "But I'm already kind of sick of it; we were making it for like a year and a half."

On 20 August 2015 the album was reissued on 12-inch vinyl by Thursday Friday in a limited run of 1,200 copies, with new artwork.

== Composition and themes ==
Ying Yang is a lo-fi record of short, reverb-heavy guitar pop songs, described by one reviewer as "draped in the gauze of reverb reverie and soft-focus mid-fi production". Its lyrics return to conspiracy, the esoteric and lost love. DeMarco later said the interest dated from the making of this record: "For a while I was super sure that the Baba Vanga prophesies were true. I was terrified about missile launches when I recorded Ying Yang." The track "Baba Vanga" takes its title from the Bulgarian clairvoyant Baba Vanga, and the same interview ties the record's recurring Masonic imagery to a period in which DeMarco says he was reading about the subject. He also said the older male names that recur in his lyrics, including Terry, were drawn from friends of his father, while describing the songs as "fantasy, but it's loosely based on reality".

The album was not entirely new material. "Because I'm a Boy" had already appeared on Eating Like a Kid earlier in 2010, where a reviewer singled it out as the point at which DeMarco's writing was "going in so many directions".

== Reception ==
Professional ratings
Review scores
Source	Rating
Now	3/5
Weird Canada	favourable

Benjamin Boles of Now rated the album three out of five, writing that "while there are few sonic surprises on Ying Yang, Vancouver-to-Montreal transplants Makeout Videotape deserve a listen just for their songwriting chops", and that the record was "a little too invested in being lo-fi and homemade, but at least the melodies aren't totally buried in noise". He named "Because I'm a Boy" its best track and predicted that, in a proper studio, "these guys could have a truly great rock album in them". Reviewing the cassette for Weird Canada, Jesse Locke was more enthusiastic, calling it "an ace combination of songwriting and sonics" on which the pair "prove themselves capable of mastering whatever style they see fit", and singling out "Brian" for its "dreamy drone".

== Legacy ==
"Only You" was carried forward onto Rock and Roll Night Club in 2012 and became one of the more discussed tracks on that record. Pitchfork called its appearance "the biggest surprise" of the album, hearing "a jangling, breezy assertiveness that's normally reserved for Real Estate songs", while No Ripcord described how the song "molds a Duane Eddy-like twangy riff into a garage stomp once it heads into its dark, seductive chorus". AllMusic's Tim Sendra compared it to a worn-out cassette demo by Deerhunter from around the time of Microcastle.

The closing track, "Walter TV", shares its name with Walter TV, the Vancouver band of DeMarco's bandmates Pierce McGarry and Joe McMurray, and the name travelled in that direction rather than the other way round. Asked in 2014 whether Walter TV had taken its name from the song, McGarry said: "No we didn't. Mac used the name for a song so he could 'get more hits on MySpace' by association." By July 2011 Discorder was describing that band's drummer, Joe McMurray, as usually playing in "the saccharine lo-fi grunge outfit Walter TV; like My Friend Wallis and Makeout Videotape". DeMarco later said that listening back to the project's recordings, they "might sound super sketchy, but there is something there".

== Track listing ==
All tracks recorded by Mac DeMarco and Alex Calder in Vancouver and Edmonton.

No.	Title	Length
1.	"Because I'm a Boy"	1:54
2.	"Only You"	3:00
3.	"Future Boy"	3:07
4.	"Baba Vanga"	2:33
5.	"Island Groovies"	2:08
6.	"Exercising with My Demons"	2:27
7.	"Freemasons Prayer"	2:44
8.	"Brian"	2:51
9.	"Terry Paranych"	2:17
10.	"The Sun's Loneliest Day"	2:32
11.	"Ying Yang"	2:54
12.	"Gone Gone Gone"	2:31
13.	"Walter TV"	1:50
Total length:		32:48

== Personnel ==
- Mac DeMarco – vocals, guitar, songwriting, recording
- Alex Calder – drums, recording

== Release history ==
Region	Date	Label	Format
Various	13 December 2010	Self-released	Digital download
Canada	2011	Totally Disconnected	Cassette
United States	20 August 2015	Thursday Friday	12-inch vinyl (1,200 copies)
