= The Courtneys II =

Studio album by the Courtneys
- Released: February 17, 2017
- Length: 38:25
- Label: Flying Nun

The Courtneys chronology
The Courtneys (2013)	The Courtneys II (2017)

Professional ratings
Aggregate scores
Source	Rating
Metacritic	75/100
Review scores
Source	Rating
AllMusic	4/5 stars
Clash	8/10
Exclaim!	8/10
MusicOMH	4/5 stars
Pitchfork	8/10

The Courtneys II is the second studio album by Canadian band the Courtneys. It was released on February 17, 2017 through Flying Nun Records.

== Accolades ==
Publication	Accolade	Rank	Ref.
Pitchfork	Top 20 Rock Albums of 2017	15	
PopMatters	Top 10 Indie Pop Albums of 2017	9	

== Track listing ==
No.	Title	Length
1.	"Silver Velvet"	3:00
2.	"Country Song"	3:57
3.	"Minnesota"	3:40
4.	"Tour"	3:53
5.	"Lost Boys"	6:50
6.	"Virgo"	2:49
7.	"25"	3:19
8.	"Iron Deficiency"	3:28
9.	"Mars Attacks"	3:09
10.	"Frankie"	4:20
