= Mac DeMarco =

Canadian musician (born 1990)

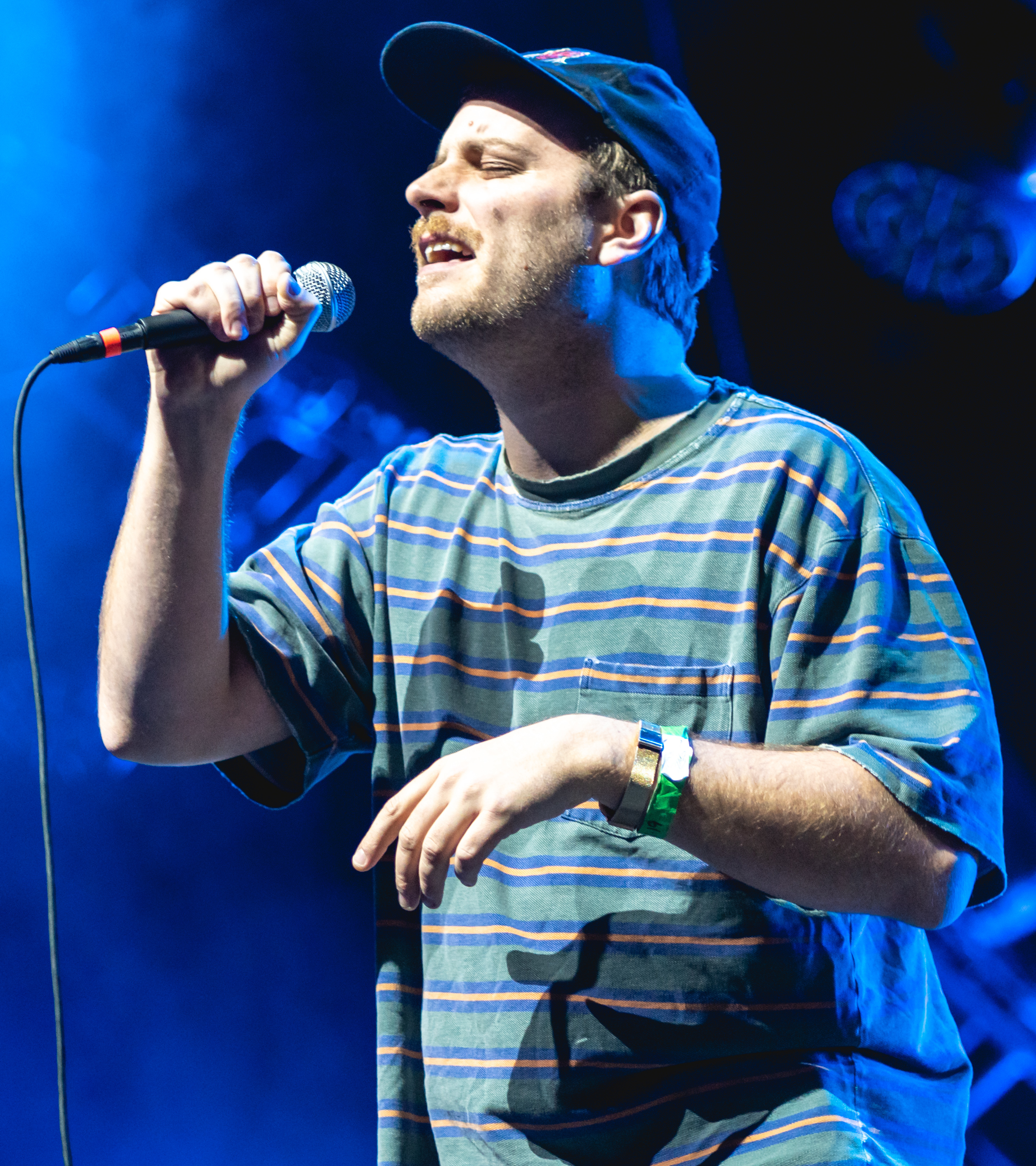
- DeMarco in 2019

Background information
- Born: Vernor Winfield McBriare Smith IV; April 30, 1990 (age 36); Duncan, British Columbia, Canada
- Origin: Edmonton, Alberta, Canada
- Genres: Indie rock; jangle pop; psychedelic pop; slacker rock; lo-fi
- Occupations: Musician; songwriter; producer
- Instruments: Vocals; guitar; keyboards; bass; drums; percussion
- Works: Mac DeMarco discography
- Years active: 2008–present
- Labels: Captured Tracks; Royal Mountain; Voltage Controlled Recordings; Easy Eye Sound; Unfamiliar; Mac's Record Label
- Partner: Kiera McNally (2009-present)
- Website: macdemarco.com

McBriare Samuel Lanyon DeMarco (born Vernor Winfield McBriare Smith IV; April 30, 1990) is a Canadian singer-songwriter. Before signing to indie label Captured Tracks and releasing his debut extended play, Rock and Roll Night Club (2012), DeMarco made music under the pseudonym "Makeout Videotape" on Bandcamp. He released albums under this name until he moved from Vancouver to Montreal in 2011 and started working as a solo artist.

DeMarco has released six full-length studio albums: 2 (2012), Salad Days (2014), This Old Dog (2017), Here Comes the Cowboy (2019), Five Easy Hot Dogs (2023) and Guitar (2025). He has also released the mini-albums Another One (2015), as well as the compilation album One Wayne G (2023). In 2018, DeMarco established his own record label, Mac's Record Label.

== Life and career ==
=== 1990–2008: Early life and education ===
McBriare Samuel Lanyon DeMarco was born in Duncan, British Columbia, on Vancouver Island, and raised in Edmonton, Alberta. His great-grandfather is Vernor Smith, Alberta's former Minister of Railways and Telephones, for whom DeMarco was named, and his grandfather (also named Vernor Winfield MacBriare Smith) was a judge of the Court of King's Bench of Alberta. His mother, Agnes DeMarco, later changed his name to McBriare Samuel Lanyon DeMarco after his father left and refused to pay child support when DeMarco was four years old. DeMarco is of Italian descent.

Mac DeMarco attended McKernan School for junior high. Around this time he started playing guitar, with lessons from his grandmother. During high school, he was in several bands, including indie rock band the Meat Cleavers, alternative R&B group the Sound of Love and post-punk band Outdoor Miners (along with current keyboardist, Alec Meen), which was named after "Outdoor Miner", a song by English rock band Wire. He started smoking cigarettes as a teenager, which became a significant part of his image. After graduating from Strathcona High School in Edmonton in 2008, DeMarco became a backing musician. He then moved to Vancouver.

=== 2009–2012: Early projects and Rock and Roll Night Club ===
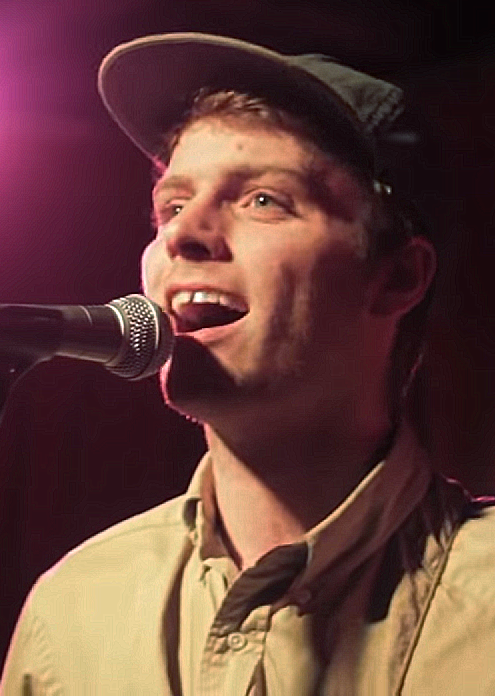
DeMarco performing at NXNE in June 2012

Living in the Killarney neighbourhood, DeMarco released the self-produced album Heat Wave as part of the indie rock project Makeout Videotape in 2009. The album sold out its 500-unit run. DeMarco worked on "psychedelic" video projects during this time. He was joined by Alex Calder and Jen Clement, signed to Unfamiliar Records, and toured with Vancouver band Japandroids in 2009. In 2011, DeMarco moved from Vancouver to Montreal to begin recording as a solo artist. Failing to find work as a musician, he participated in medical experiments for money and worked on a road paving crew. On January 9, 2012, DeMarco signed to record label Captured Tracks. In early 2012, he released an LP titled Rock and Roll Night Club. The album features skits and slowed-down vocals.

=== 2012–2015: 2, Salad Days and Another One ===
In October 2012, Captured Tracks released DeMarco's debut studio album, titled 2. 2 was received well by critics, garnering a "Best New Music" designation from Pitchfork.

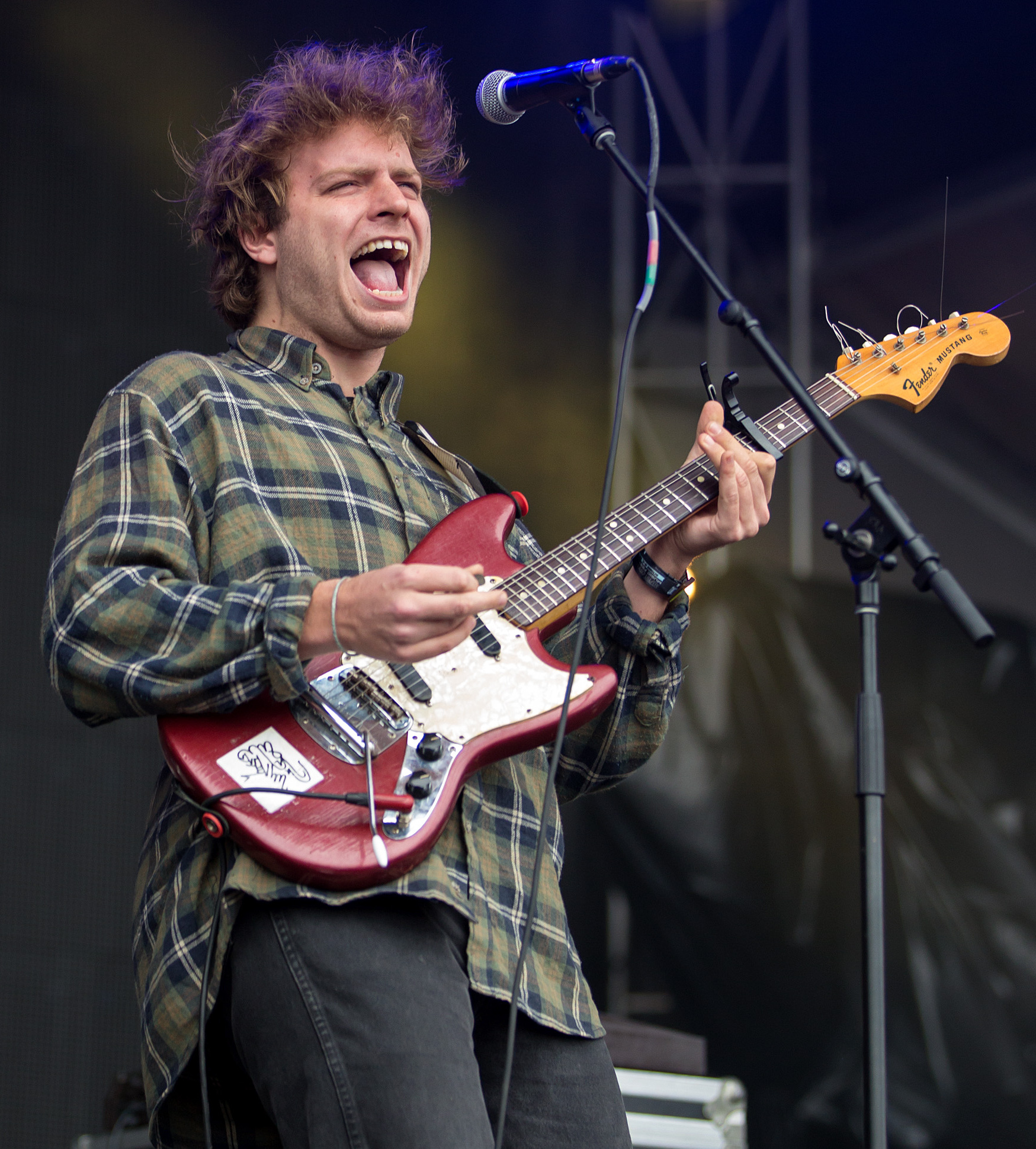
DeMarco performing in 2014

In April 2014, DeMarco released his second studio album, Salad Days. Its lead single, "Passing Out Pieces", was released on January 21, 2014. The album received the "Best New Music" designation from Pitchfork and was nominated for the 2014 Polaris Music Prize.

On March 30, 2015, DeMarco performed the song "Let Her Go" on Conan, marking his first talk show appearance (and second TV appearance after The Eric Andre Show). In August 2015, Demarco released the album Another One. DeMarco describes the album as a collection of love songs. Another One received generally favourable reviews from music critics. In July 2015, DeMarco released a 9-track instrumental album titled Some Other Ones, calling it a "BBQ soundtrack". The album was later re-released in 2023 on streaming services.

=== 2017–2020: This Old Dog and Here Comes the Cowboy ===
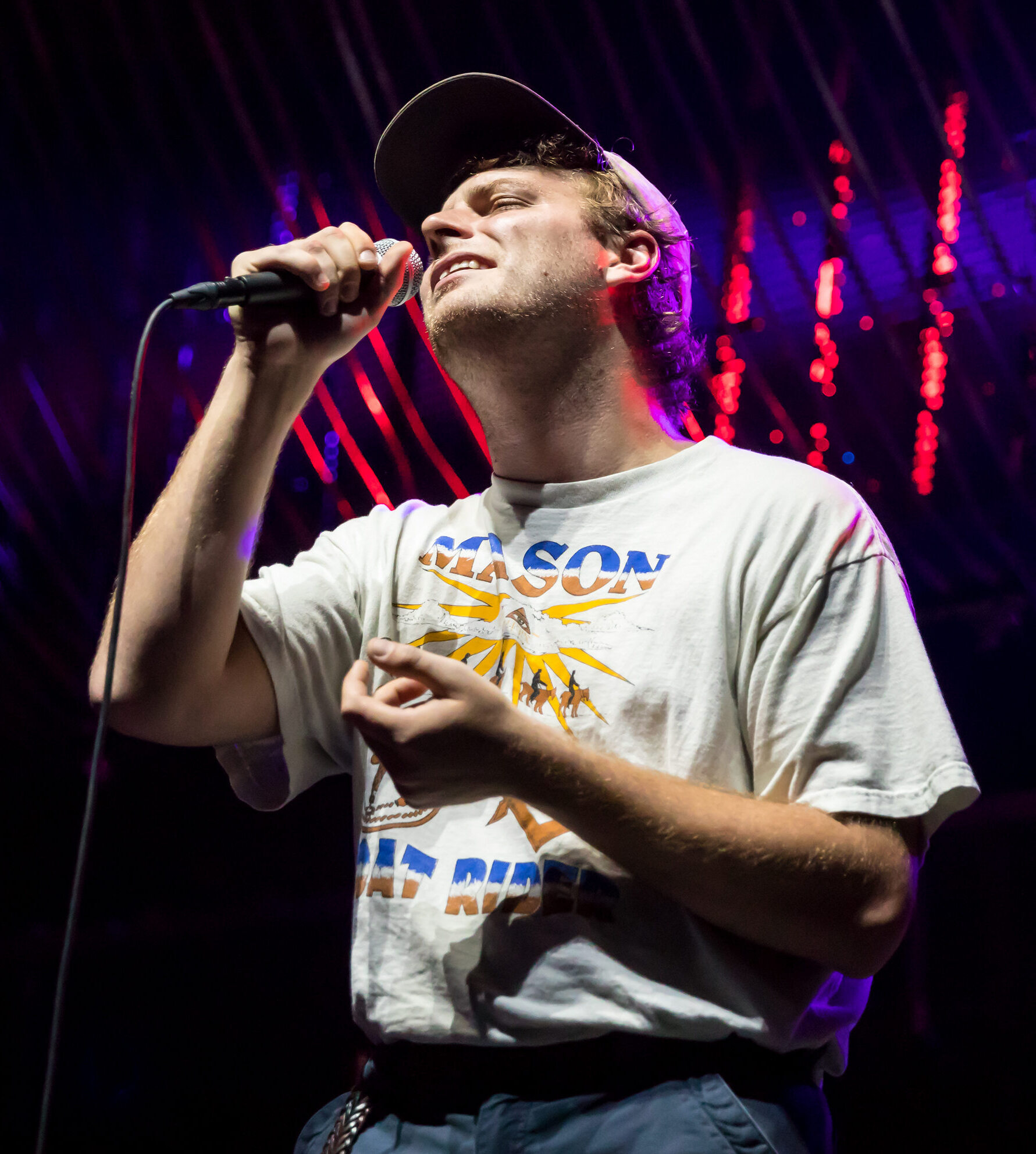
DeMarco performing in 2017

In May 2017, DeMarco released his third studio album, titled This Old Dog. It was preceded by two singles in January 2017. On April 8, 2018, DeMarco appeared on FishCenter Live and participated in an interview with Max Simonet.

In May 2019, DeMarco released his fourth studio album, Here Comes the Cowboy, through Mac's Record Label. The first single from the album, "Nobody", was released on March 5, 2019. The album marked his first top ten appearance in the US Billboard 200 at number 10, while it received mixed reviews from critics.

In September 2020, DeMarco collaborated on a song with English artist Yellow Days, "The Curse". The following month, DeMarco appeared on French musician Myd's single "Moving Men". An animated version of DeMarco also appeared in the music video for the single. DeMarco also appeared in the music video for the song "Whatever You Want" by Crowded House. DeMarco contributed a cover of Metallica's "Enter Sandman" to the charity tribute album The Metallica Blacklist (2021).

=== 2021–2023: Five Easy Hot Dogs and One Wayne G ===
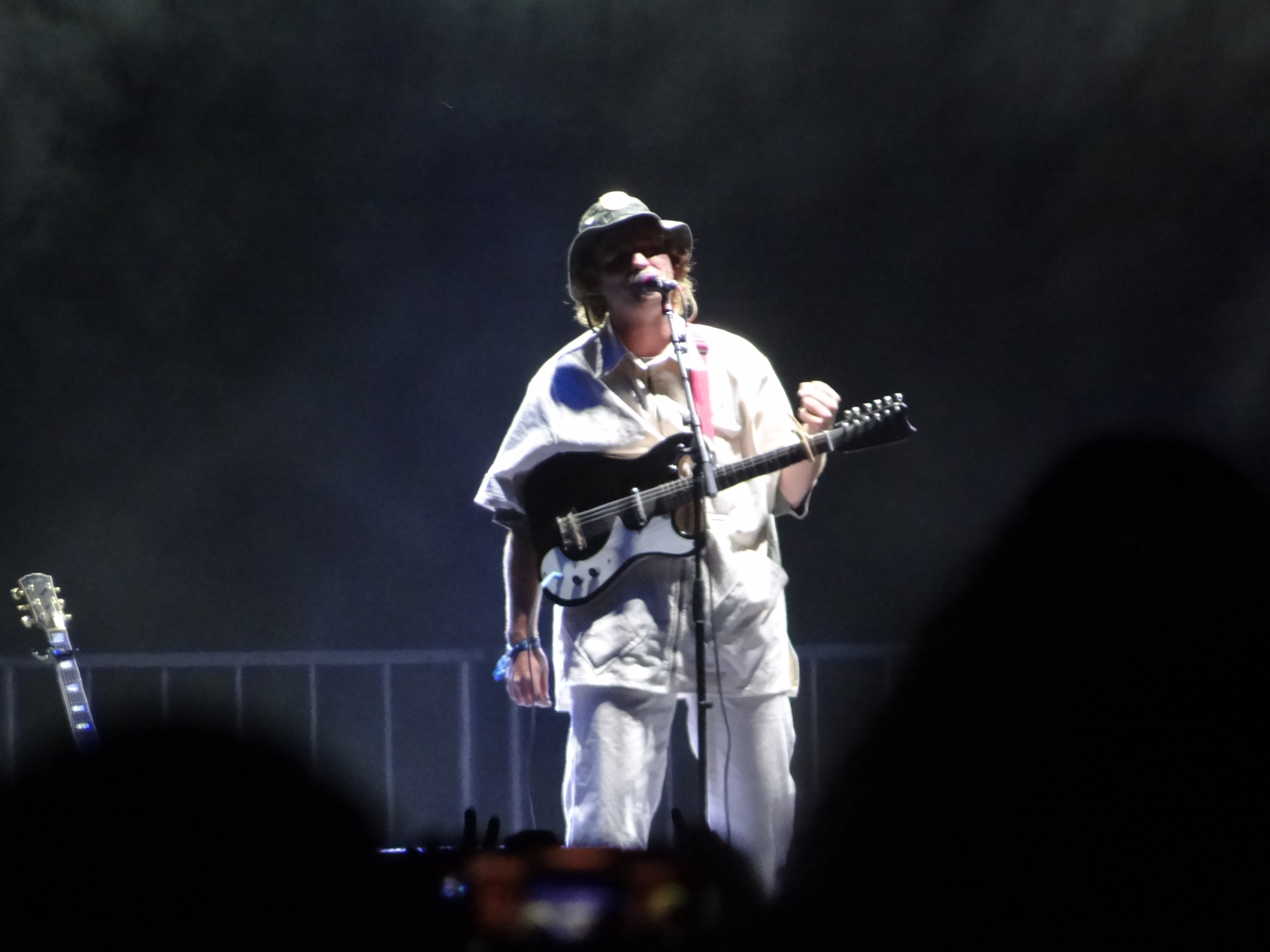
DeMarco performing at Shaky Knees in 2021

In October 2021, DeMarco returned to live performances following a hiatus due to the COVID-19 pandemic. His return to the stage was marked by changes to his live band, with the departure of longtime members Joe McMurray, Andrew White and Jon Lent, and the addition of Daryl Johns (bass) and JD Beck (drums). Jon Lent left the band after being sentenced to two years in jail for sexual assault. DeMarco "immediately removed" Lent from the band after learning about his arrest. Andy White confirmed his departure shortly afterwards.

DeMarco released an instrumental album, Five Easy Hot Dogs, in January 2023. The 14-track album was recorded in different locations during a road trip from Los Angeles to Utah. During the week of Five Easy Hot Dogs's release, the song "Heart to Heart" from DeMarco's previous album, Here Comes the Cowboy, went viral on TikTok. As a result, the song became DeMarco's first to chart on the US Billboard Hot 100, eventually peaking at number 83. The song also reached the top 10 and top 5 of Billboard's Hot Rock Songs and Hot Alternative Songs charts, respectively.

On April 21, 2023, DeMarco released his first compilation album titled One Wayne G, online only, without any prior announcement. The album, released without prior announcement, featured 199 tracks of instrumental and demo recordings made between 2018 and 2023. With a runtime of just a little under nine hours, it received positive coverage for its experimental format and intimate atmosphere.

=== 2025–present: Guitar and "secret albums" ===
In 2024, DeMarco recorded an album titled Hear The Music, which was not announced or released to the public. On April 8, 2025, DeMarco announced a tour beginning in August and ending in December 2025. The tour was set to be held following the release of his new album, which he additionally announced would be released in August 2025. DeMarco later announced additional tour dates in Europe in 2026.

In August 2025, DeMarco released his sixth studio album, Guitar. Its lead single, "Home", was released in June. The album was recorded in November 2024 in Mac's home studio in Los Angeles, with DeMarco recording, mixing, and producing the album himself and David Ives mastering. During the European leg of the Guitar tour, DeMarco hid copies of a "secret album" for fans to find. The first album, titled Dog on the Rock, was uploaded to the Internet by fans who found the hidden CD-R copies. A second album, titled Seven off the Two, was found by fans in Canada and subsequently uploaded to SoundCloud. These albums, alongside similar "secret albums" Seaplane Dog and The View from Tian Tian, were released to streaming on August 28, 2026.

== Artistry ==
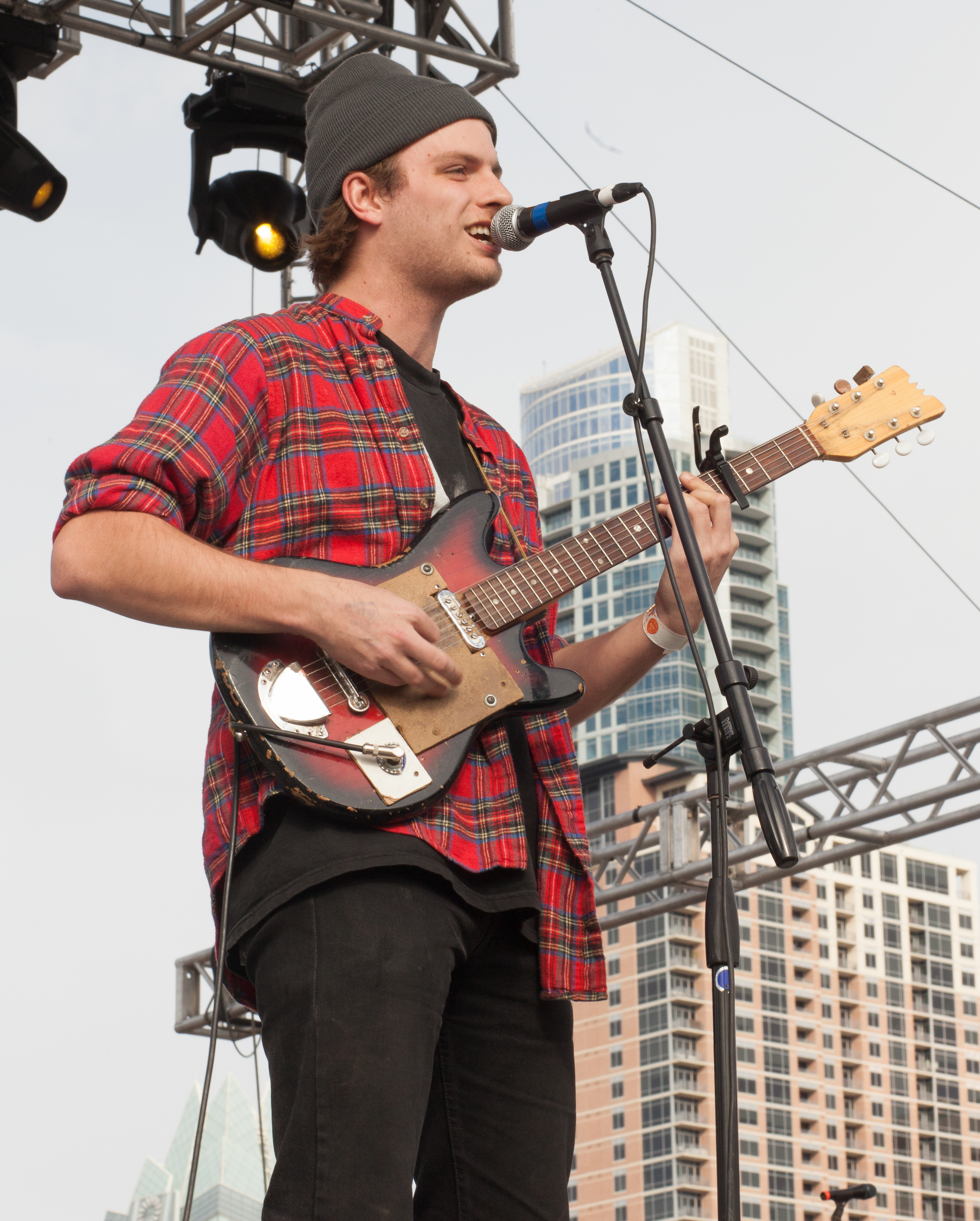
DeMarco performing with his Teisco electric guitar in 2013

DeMarco's style employs the use of flat drums (little or no reverberation or dynamic range compression), chorus and vibrato effects on the guitar and a generally lazy atmosphere à la soft rock records, muted and low frequency bass guitars. He has mentioned Michael Jackson, Neil Young, Shuggie Otis, Black Sabbath, Christopher Cross, Siouxsie and the Banshees, Jonathan Richman, Genesis, Sting and Weezer as favourite artists. He has also named Japanese musician Haruomi Hosono as his favourite artist.

DeMarco's music has been generally classified as indie rock, psychedelic rock, jangle pop, and lo-fi. It has also been described as "blue wave" and slacker rock. His guitar-based compositions have moved from glam-inspired works to what reviewers describe as "off-kilter pop" or "folk rock". DeMarco has self identified his style as "jizz jazz". He named his apartment studio Jizz Jazz Studios, which he mentioned in a documentary starring himself, Pepperoni Playboy. DeMarco has pointed to artists such as John Maus, Ariel Pink, Brian Eno, Daniel Lopatin, Isao Tomita, Joe Meek and R. Stevie Moore as influences on his reel-to-reel production style.

== Personal life ==
Since 2009, DeMarco has been in a relationship with Kiera McNally. The couple met as teenagers in Edmonton, Alberta. From 2011 to 2012, DeMarco lived in Montreal, before moving to Brooklyn, New York, United States. From 2013 to 2016 he was based in the Far Rockaway neighborhood in Queens, New York. Afterwards, he resided in Los Angeles, where he regularly hosted jam sessions with musicians and friends such as Thundercat and Mac Miller. In January 2023, DeMarco said he no longer smokes. In 2025, DeMarco purchased a one-hundred-year-old farmhouse on Pender Island in British Columbia.

DeMarco is a fan of the Edmonton Oilers, his hometown ice hockey team. One Wayne G (2023) is named after hockey player Wayne Gretzky, with its 199-song length referencing Gretzky's 99 jersey number.

== Other ventures ==
=== Philanthropy ===
In 2018, DeMarco partnered with the non-profit organization Plus1 for his tours that year, and one dollar for every ticket purchase went to the Girls Rock Camp Alliance to "[empower] girls, trans and gender-diverse young people through music education and mentorship."

=== Mac's Record Label ===
In 2018, DeMarco launched his own record label titled 'Mac's Record Label'. In 2021, the first artist to be signed was Tex Crick with his album Live in... New York City, followed by Vicky Farewell with her album Sweet Company in 2022.

== Awards and nominations ==
Award	Year	Category	Nominee(s)	Result	Ref.
Polaris Music Prize	2013	Album of the Year (Longlist)	2	Nominated	
Polaris Music Prize	2014	Album of the Year (Shortlist)	Salad Days	Nominated	
Polaris Music Prize	2017	Album of the Year (Longlist)	This Old Dog	Nominated	
Rober Awards Music Prize	2012	Breakthrough Artist	Himself	Nominated	
Rober Awards Music Prize	2014	Best Male Artist	Himself	Nominated	
Rober Awards Music Prize	2014	Best Songwriter	Himself	Nominated	

== Backing band members ==
Current members

- Alec Meen – keyboards, backing vocals, percussion (2017–present), guitar (2021–2023)
- Pedro Martins — bass guitar (2023), electric guitar, backing vocals (2024–present)
- Daryl Johns — bass guitar, backing vocals (2021–2022, 2024-present), drums (2023)
- Phillippe Melanson — drums, backing vocals (2025–present)

Former members

- Peter Sagar – guitar, keyboards, backing vocals (2012–2014)
- Pierce McGarry – bass guitar, backing vocals (2012–2016)
- Joe McMurray – drums, occasional backing vocals (2012–2020)
- Alex Calder — guitar (2012)
- Ryan Boyce — drums (2012)
- Andy White – guitar, keyboards, percussion, backing vocals (2014–2020)
- Jon Lent — bass guitar (2012, 2016–2020), keyboards, percussion (2015–2016)
- Rory McCarthy — bass guitar (2016)
- JD Beck — drums (2021–2022)
- Chris Fishman — drums (2024)

== Discography ==
=== Solo ===
Studio albums

- 2 (2012)
- Salad Days (2014)
- This Old Dog (2017)
- Here Comes the Cowboy (2019)
- Five Easy Hot Dogs (2023)
- Guitar (2025)

Mini-LPs

- Rock and Roll Night Club (2012)
- Another One (2015)

Compilations

- One Wayne G (2023)

Demos

● 2 Demos (2012)

No.	Title	Length
1.	"Cooking Up Something Good"	2:07
2.	"Stars Keep Calling My Name"	2:24
3.	"Dreamin' Slow"	2:37
4.	"Lonely Shredder"	3:07
5.	"Robson Girl"	2:40
6.	"Annie"	3:28
7.	"Harrison Ford Escort"	2:52
8.	"Sherrill"	2:06
9.	"My Kind of Woman" (instrumental)	4:29
10.	"Dreamin' Fast"	1:44

● Salad Days Demos (2014)

No.	Title	Length
1.	"Goodbye Weekend"	2:50
2.	"Salad Days"	2:29
3.	"Ken the Wolf Boy"	2:37
4.	"Passing Out Pieces of Me"	3:02
5.	"Organ Ronald Donkey Water"	2:53
6.	"Let My Baby Stay"	2:56
7.	"Pepperoni Playboy"	2:30
8.	"Brother"	2:58
9.	"Potato Boy"	2:46
10.	"Go Easy"	3:31
11.	"Horse Hot Wee Wee Water"	3:12
12.	"Blue Boy"	2:14
13.	"Sloopy Lau Lau"	2:46
14.	"Avocado Andrew"	1:09

● Another (Demo) One (2016)

● Old Dog Demos (2018)

● Here Comes the Cowboy Demos (2020)

● Other Here Comes the Cowboy Demos (2020)

=== With Makeout Videotape ===
Adapted from the Bandcamp music store.

Studio albums

● Ying Yang (2010)

No.	Title	Length
1.	"Because I'm A Boy"	1:54
2.	"Only You"	3:00
3.	"Future Boy"	3:06
4.	"Baba Vanga"	2:33
5.	"Island Groovies"	2:08
6.	"Exercising With My Demons"	2:27
7.	"Freemason's Prayer"	2:44
8.	"Brian"	2:51
9.	"Terry Paranych"	2:17
10.	"The Sun's Loneliest Day"	2:32
11.	"Ying Yang"	2:54
12.	"Gone Gone Gone"	2:31
13.	"Walter TV"	1:50

● Eyeballing (2011)

No.	Title	Length
1.	"For Sara"	1:49
2.	"My Mind"	0:58
3.	"Thought I Was In Love"	2:35
4.	"Talk With Me Baby"	2:30
5.	"Buddhism"	1:09
6.	"Island Groovies"	2:16
7.	"Expensive Supper"	2:12
8.	"Maggie"	3:32
9.	"Lasagna Sunset"	1:54

Extended plays (EPs)

● Heat Wave! (2009)

No.	Title	Length
1.	"Slush Puppy Love"	2:24
2.	"Coming Up Soon"	2:17
3.	"I Guess The Lord Must Be In New York (Harry Nilsson cover)"	2:30
4.	"Heat Wave"	2:02
5.	"S.R.V."	0:51
6.	"Spooky Eyes"	1:30
7.	"Basketball Kids"	2:04

● Eating Like A Kid (2010)

No.	Title	Length
1.	"Because I'm a Boy"	1:49
2.	"Blondie"	1:47
3.	"Deborah"	1:29
4.	"Eating Like a Kid"	2:39
5.	"Gigi Bungsu"	1:25
6.	"Swim Dream"	2:16
7.	"Yangtze Bathing"	1:19

● Weird Meats (2010)

No.	Title	Length
1.	"Thought I Was Love"	2:32
2.	"Lasagna Sunset"	1:55

● Bossa Yeye (2011)

No.	Title	Length
1.	"My Jean"	2:15
2.	"Joe Buck"	2:48
3.	"On The Yangtze"	2:32
4.	"Marilyn And Me"	2:29
5.	"Together"	2:25
