= 2 (Mac DeMarco album) =

2012 studio album by Mac DeMarco

Studio album by Mac DeMarco
- Released: October 16, 2012
- Recorded: June 2012
- Studios: Jizz Jazz Studios (1060 Av Van Horne, Outremont, Montreal)
- Genres: indie rock; jangle pop
- Length: 31:27
- Label: Captured Tracks

Mac DeMarco chronology
Rock and Roll Night Club (2012)	2 (2012)	Salad Days (2014)

2 is the debut studio album by Canadian musician Mac DeMarco. It was recorded in June 2012, and released in October 2012 on the Captured Tracks label.

== Background ==
DeMarco moved from Vancouver to Montreal in 2011. There, he recorded a mini LP under his own name, Rock and Roll Nightclub. Featuring slowed-down vocals and elements of glam rock, this recording garnered enough attention that his label, Captured Tracks, agreed to finance a full-length album. DeMarco shifted his style from Rock and Roll Nightclub to 2, and his glam and crooning singing style were dropped for a more standard approach to guitar rock. It was composed and recorded in DeMarco's Montreal apartment, in the Mile End neighbourhood. DeMarco made the recording wearing only his "skivvies", or underwear. In a June 2012 interview, DeMarco announced that about 75% of the album had been completed.

== Music ==
The album contains a single acoustic track, "Still Together", which is a re-recording of "Together", written by DeMarco on 2009 to Makeout Videotape EP "Bossa Yeye", also features DeMarco using falsetto singing in the chorus. The opener, "Cooking Up Something Good", uses a song structure where a catchy verse transitions to a "blindsiding" darker chorus. "Robson Girl" also juxtaposes a "sweet" verse with a guitar-shredding chorus.

Lyrically, DeMarco covers growing up in suburbia, failed love and family secrets, the last featuring heavily in "Cooking Up Something Good". "Ode to Viceroy" is a tribute to the singer's favourite brand of cigarettes. DeMarco is apologizing to his mother in "Freaking Out the Neighbourhood", and trying to convince a girl to leave town with him in "The Stars Keep on Calling My Name".

== Artwork ==
In September 2014, DeMarco stated in a "What's in My Bag?" interview video at Amoeba Records in San Francisco, California that he had been inspired by the album art for Haruomi Hosono's Hosono House for the design of 2’s album cover. In the same interview, DeMarco also points out his cover’s striking but coincidental similarity to Bruce Springsteen's The River.

== Reception ==
Professional ratings
Aggregate scores
Source	Rating
AnyDecentMusic?	7.4/10
Metacritic	81/100
Review scores
Source	Rating
AllMusic	3.5/5 stars
The Austin Chronicle	4/5 stars
Consequence of Sound	3.5/5 stars
The Guardian	3/5 stars
Exclaim!	8/10
MusicOMH	4/5 stars
NME	8/10
Pitchfork	8.2/10
Time Out	4/5 stars
Uncut	8/10

On Metacritic, which assigns a weighted mean rating out of 100 to reviews from mainstream critics, 2 received an 81 out of 100, indicating “universal acclaim” based on 17 reviews. The album was compared by several reviewers to Real Estate's 2011 release, Days. NME called DeMarco a "skilled songwriter" and likened him to fictional character Ferris Bueller. DeMarco's guitar work was praised by several reviewers. The Guardian remarked that, although the initial tracks have promise, the album "never quite delivers" and criticised its "unvarying" tone. Pitchfork gave an enthusiastic review, awarding the record its "Best New Music" designation. Reviewer Sam Hockley-Smith commented positively on DeMarco's songwriting and lyrical depth. The website placed the album at 43rd on their "50 Best Albums of the Year" retrospective.

It was named a longlisted nominee for the 2013 Polaris Music Prize on June 13, 2013.

2 was recognized as one of The 100 Best Albums of the Decade So Far, a list published by Pitchfork in August 2014. In 2019, Pitchfork ranked the album at number 149 on their list of "The 200 Best Albums of the 2010s".

== Track listing ==
All tracks are written by Mac DeMarco.

No.	Title	Length
1.	"Cooking Up Something Good"	2:41
2.	"Dreaming"	2:27
3.	"Freaking Out the Neighborhood"	2:53
4.	"Annie"	3:10
5.	"Ode to Viceroy"	3:53
6.	"Robson Girl"	2:56
7.	"The Stars Keep On Calling My Name"	2:22
8.	"My Kind of Woman"	3:10
9.	"Boe Zaah"	1:41
10.	"Sherrill"	2:29
11.	"Still Together"	3:39
Total length:		31:27

== Personnel ==
All credits adapted from physical releases

- Mac DeMarco - songwriting, all instruments, mixing
- Josh Bonati - mastering
- Evan Prosofsky - photography

== Charts ==
Chart (2012)	Peak position
US Heatseekers Albums (Billboard)	14
US Vinyl Albums (Billboard)	14
Chart (2023)
US Americana/Folk Albums (Billboard)	24

== Certifications ==
Region	Certification	Certified units/sales
United States (RIAA)	Gold	500,000^{‡}
^{‡} Sales+streaming figures based on certification alone.
