= Salad Days (Mac DeMarco album) =

Studio album by Mac DeMarco
- Released: April 1, 2014
- Recorded: October 2013
- Studios: DeMarco's apartment in Brooklyn, New York
- Genres: Indie rock; jangle pop; psychedelic pop; soft rock; lo-fi
- Length: 34:41
- Label: Captured Tracks

Mac DeMarco chronology
2 (2012)	Salad Days (2014)	Another One (2015)

Singles from Salad Days
- 1. "Passing Out Pieces" Released: January 21, 2014; 2. "Brother" Released: March 6, 2014

Salad Days is the second studio album by Canadian musician Mac DeMarco. It was released on April 1, 2014 through Captured Tracks. Following the debut releases of Rock and Roll Night Club and 2 in 2012 and the extensive touring for both releases in 2013, DeMarco worked on material for his next album at his Bedford-Stuyvesant apartment in Brooklyn. Salad Days garnered acclaim from critics, and debuted at number 30 on the Billboard 200. The album spawned two singles: "Passing Out Pieces" and "Brother". To promote the album, DeMarco went on a tour that spanned across North America, South America and Europe.

== Background and recording ==
DeMarco recorded Salad Days in his apartment, in the Bedford–Stuyvesant area of Brooklyn, New York, following an extensive tour in support of his debut releases, Rock and Roll Night Club and 2, both of which were released in 2012. DeMarco noted that he felt "fuckin' bummed out", upon the tour's completion, stating: "I feel sort of weathered and beat down and grown up all of a sudden. I've always had some kind of plateau that I wanted to reach, and now I just can't see the next one." The album was recorded on a Fostex A-8, just like its predecessor, 2.

== Writing and composition ==
On the sound of Salad Days, DeMarco said: "I didn't want to freak anybody out with a huge sound change. I wanted to transition without changing the vibe too much. The mood for Salad Days is, 'Fuck man! I was just on tour for a year and a half and I'm tired!'"

Regarding the album's lyrical content, DeMarco consciously decided to write a more personal record than its predecessor, 2 (2012), stating there wouldn't be any songs about "absolutely nothing", and that he "need[ed] to get this shit out". Three of the album's tracks focus upon his long-term girlfriend Kiera McNally, with "Let My Baby Stay" referencing the couple's decision to move from Montreal, Quebec, Canada to Brooklyn.

The track "Chamber of Reflection" is based on Sekitō Shigeo’s composition "Word 2" (1975). It references a Freemasonry concept, also called the Chamber of Reflection. DeMarco subsequently likened the concept to his home studio: "It's a room people go into before you're initiated into freemasonry. It's like a meditation room, and they lock you in there for a period of time. The purpose is to reflect on what you've done in your life already and move on from it. I think that's what I did in [my home studio] right here. It was actually therapeutic. I feel a little enlightened, a little less heavy. It's tight".

== Release ==
On January 12, 2014 Mac DeMarco told CKUA Radio Network that his second studio album would be titled Salad Days and would be released in April. He also performed three new songs: "Treat Her Better", "Salad Days" and "Let Her Go". The next day, he announced 36 tour dates in North America, South America and Europe. On January 21, the release date of April 1, the track listing and album cover were revealed. That day also saw the release of the first single, "Passing Out Pieces", and the album was made available for pre-order in the iTunes Store with an immediate download for "Passing Out Pieces". The second single, "Brother", was released on March 6.

== Critical reception ==
Professional ratings
Aggregate scores
Source	Rating
AnyDecentMusic?	7.9/10
Metacritic	82/100
Review scores
Source	Rating
AllMusic	5/5 stars
The A.V. Club	A−
The Guardian	4/5 stars
Mojo	4/5 stars
NME	9/10
The Observer	4/5 stars
Pitchfork	8.5/10
Q	4/5 stars
Rolling Stone	3.5/5 stars
Spin	8/10

Upon its release, Salad Days was met with critical acclaim. At Metacritic, which assigns a weighted mean rating out of 100 to reviews from mainstream critics, the album received an average score of 82 out of 100 based on 27 reviews, which indicates "universal acclaim". Marc Hogan of Pitchfork stated that Salad Days "isn't a departure from its predecessor so much as a richer, increasingly assured refinement". Fred Thomas of AllMusic wrote that DeMarco showcases "a streamlined picture of his musical development", and that "with more memorable tracks and a slightly more accessible feel, the album is less distracted and more tuneful than before without losing any of the freewheeling spirit that made his songs and persona so attractive in the first place." Alex Denney of NME concluded that DeMarco had "simply dialled down the quirk and written his best record yet."

NME named Salad Days the second best album of 2014, while the tracks "Chamber of Reflection" and "Passing Out Pieces" placed at numbers 10 and 26 respectively on their list of the top 50 tracks of 2014. Salad Days was a shortlisted nominee for the 2014 Polaris Music Prize. The album was the most played record across Canadian community radio in April 2014 and the second most played album of 2014, behind Chad VanGaalen's Shrink Dust, as tracked by the National Campus and Community Radio Association's national charts, !earshot. In October 2019, Salad Days placed at no. 21 on Happy Mag's list of "The 25 best psychedelic rock albums of the 2010s".

== Commercial performance ==
Salad Days debuted at number 30 on the Billboard 200 and number 11 on Top Rock Albums, selling 10,000 copies in its first week. Its debut represented DeMarco's highest chart peak and best sales week until the release of Another One the following year. The album has sold 51,000 copies in the US as of July 2015.

== Track listing ==
All tracks are written by Mac DeMarco.

Standard version
No.	Title	Length
1.	"Salad Days"	2:25
2.	"Blue Boy"	2:06
3.	"Brother"	3:32
4.	"Let Her Go"	3:02
5.	"Goodbye Weekend"	2:59
6.	"Let My Baby Stay"	4:08
7.	"Passing Out Pieces"	2:47
8.	"Treat Her Better"	3:49
9.	"Chamber of Reflection"	3:51
10.	"Go Easy"	3:24
11.	"Jonny's Odyssey"	2:38
Total length:		34:41

iTunes pre-order bonus tracks
No.	Title	Length
12.	"Go Easy" (Demo)	3:30
13.	"Passing Out Pieces" (Demo)	3:02
Total length:		39:13

== Personnel ==
Credits adapted from physical releases

- Mac DeMarco - songwriting, all instruments, mixing
- Josh Bonati - mastering
- Coley Brown - photography
- Steven Marx - typography

== Charts ==
Chart (2014)	Peak position
Belgian Albums (Ultratop Flanders)	94
Belgian Albums (Ultratop Wallonia)	147
UK Albums (Official Charts)	90
UK Independent Albums (Official Charts)	17
US Billboard 200	30
US Independent Albums (Billboard)	5
US Top Alternative Albums (Billboard)	8
US Top Rock Albums (Billboard)	11

== Certifications ==
Certifications for Salad Days
Region	Certification	Certified units/sales
Denmark (IFPI Danmark)	Gold	10,000^{‡}
United Kingdom (BPI)	Silver	60,000^{‡}
United States (RIAA)	Gold	500,000^{‡}
^{‡} Sales+streaming figures based on certification alone.

== Release history ==
Region	Date	Format(s)	Edition(s)	Label	Ref.
Germany	March 28, 2014	LP; digital download	Standard	Captured Tracks	
France	March 31, 2014	CD; LP; digital download	Standard	Captured Tracks	
United Kingdom	March 31, 2014	CD; LP; digital download	Standard	Captured Tracks	
United States	April 1, 2014	CD; LP; cassette; digital download	Standard	Captured Tracks	
United States	April 1, 2014	2x12" record	Deluxe	Captured Tracks	
Germany	April 11, 2014	CD	Standard	Captured Tracks	
