= One Wayne G =

2023 compilation album by Mac DeMarco

Compilation album by Mac DeMarco
- Released: April 21, 2023
- Recorded: May 12, 2018 – January 14, 2023
- Length: 523:20
- Label: Mac's Record Label
- Producer: Mac DeMarco

Mac DeMarco chronology
Five Easy Hot Dogs (2023)	One Wayne G (2023)	Guitar (2025)

Professional ratings
Review scores
Source	Rating
Pitchfork	6.1/10
Paste Magazine	5.7/10

One Wayne G is the first compilation album by Canadian musician Mac DeMarco, self-released on April 21, 2023. The album comprises 199 mostly instrumental tracks lasting nearly nine hours, making it the longest release by DeMarco. A number of the songs had been heard before in online live streams.

== Background ==
The album was initially released online only, with no prior announcement. A post on the Instagram account for Mac's Record Label indicated a cut-down LP record and cassette release would be forthcoming. However, DeMarco later confirmed images of the physical media were mock-ups created for a joke, and the album would remain digital-only. However, a Blu-ray of the album was eventually released in late 2023.

He chose to release the tracks as one long album in order to chart his evolution as an artist over a five-year span, and to document his need to continuously write and record new music. The album’s title is a play on Canadian hockey player Wayne Gretzky, who wore number 99 for most of his career.

== Composition ==
Of the 199 tracks, 18 have full titles and lyrics, the remainder being instrumentals or having simple scratch vocals, suggesting the album is composed of demos as well as finished pieces. All track titles include a date (in ISO 8601 / YYYYMMDD format), showing that the album was recorded between May 2018 and January 2023.

== Reception ==
One Wayne G received mixed to positive reviews by critics. Writer Nadine Smith of Pitchfork said "Even if there’s a playful disposability to One Wayne G when contrasted with the work of Hosono or Sakamoto, DeMarco attempts to navigate a similar line, finding room to push at the edges of sound—and remind us of the artist’s existence—even if he’s only in the background of your consciousness."

Writer Matt Mitchell of Paste Magazine said "Once you whittle away the fat of those sub-one-minute songs, there’s a really lovely, unproblematic album in there. The bloat of One Wayne G can be distracting, but the meaty parts are all an upgrade from what we got on Here Comes the Cowboy four years ago."

== Track listing ==
All tracks are written by Mac DeMarco.

One Wayne G track listing
No.	Title	Length
1.	"20180512"	4:07
2.	"20180529"	2:31
3.	"20180701"	2:05
4.	"20180702"	2:20
5.	"20180702 2"	2:37
6.	"20180816"	2:15
7.	"20180913"	2:11
8.	"20180924"	2:03
9.	"20180927"	1:19
10.	"20180930"	3:08
11.	"20181002"	0:32
12.	"20181019"	2:56
13.	"20181108"	3:03
14.	"20181212"	2:46
15.	"20190127"	3:21
16.	"20190205"	4:52
17.	"20190205 2"	2:35
18.	"20190205 3"	3:59
19.	"20190206"	2:56
20.	"20190210"	4:41
21.	"20190622"	3:50
22.	"20190722"	1:42
23.	"20190723"	2:17
24.	"20190724"	1:10
25.	"20190724 2"	1:52
26.	"20190726"	1:46
27.	"20190728"	2:00
28.	"20190729"	3:07
29.	"20190730"	1:56
30.	"20190801"	2:25
31.	"20190802"	4:06
32.	"20190813"	1:14
33.	"20190813 2"	3:02
34.	"20190813 3"	1:32
35.	"20190826"	22:37
36.	"20191009 I Like Her"	2:16
37.	"20191010 No Doubt About It"	3:02
38.	"20191011 You Made the Bed"	2:13
39.	"20191012 Fooled by Love"	3:17
40.	"20191202"	1:00
41.	"20191215"	2:16
42.	"20191216"	2:11
43.	"20191219"	2:11
44.	"20191227"	2:08
45.	"20191228"	1:50
46.	"20191229"	6:15
47.	"20200101"	2:28
48.	"20200107"	2:21
49.	"20200107 2"	2:41
50.	"20200108"	2:34
51.	"20200109"	2:07
52.	"20200115"	3:04
53.	"20200223"	3:21
54.	"20200225"	6:20
55.	"20200228"	3:03
56.	"20200229"	3:37
57.	"20200229 2"	13:42
58.	"20200316"	3:13
59.	"20200317"	2:16
60.	"20200323"	2:48
61.	"20200323 2"	1:31
62.	"20200324"	2:39
63.	"20200326"	1:48
64.	"20200327"	2:05
65.	"20200329"	2:40
66.	"20200330"	2:18
67.	"20200402"	3:09
68.	"20200801"	2:22
69.	"20200802"	2:40
70.	"20200808"	2:38
71.	"20200811"	1:22
72.	"20200812"	2:42
73.	"20200813"	1:29
74.	"20200816 She Want the Sandwich"	1:58
75.	"20200817 Proud True Toyota"	2:02
76.	"20200819 She Get the Gold Star"	2:41
77.	"20200820 Turn My TV On"	3:00
78.	"20200821 Cowboy Shit"	3:21
79.	"20200823 Inside the Beavers Dam"	1:20
80.	"20200922"	1:10
81.	"20201022"	2:34
82.	"20201023"	2:36
83.	"20201023 2"	2:22
84.	"20201110"	2:51
85.	"20201110 2"	2:37
86.	"20201111"	2:27
87.	"20201111 2"	2:08
88.	"20201115"	1:58
89.	"20201119"	1:46
90.	"20201119 2"	1:19
91.	"20201124"	1:47
92.	"20201125"	2:52
93.	"20201126"	3:31
94.	"20201126 2"	2:10
95.	"20201126 3"	1:41
96.	"20201127"	2:48
97.	"20201128"	2:03
98.	"20201128 2"	1:52
99.	"20201128 3"	1:43
100.	"20201203"	4:18
101.	"20201228"	3:05
102.	"20201230"	2:48
103.	"20201231"	2:07
104.	"20210215 Ball for the Coach"	2:00
105.	"20210216 Goodnight Baby"	3:04
106.	"20210217 Scarecrow"	3:24
107.	"20210218 Round Here"	2:49
108.	"20210220 China"	1:56
109.	"20210220 Stratocaster"	2:02
110.	"20210221 Father of the Year"	1:17
111.	"20210301"	1:52
112.	"20210303"	2:45
113.	"20210306"	0:50
114.	"20210306 2"	2:28
115.	"20210306 3"	3:10
116.	"20210306 4"	2:11
117.	"20210307"	2:22
118.	"20210327"	2:27
119.	"20210507"	2:35
120.	"20210511"	1:37
121.	"20210516"	2:10
122.	"20210517"	3:21
123.	"20210518"	2:34
124.	"20210529"	2:21
125.	"20210601"	2:32
126.	"20210603"	2:38
127.	"20210606"	3:15
128.	"20210612"	1:10
129.	"20210616"	2:34
130.	"20210616 2"	1:52
131.	"20210621"	2:09
132.	"20210629"	1:17
133.	"20210629 2"	1:49
134.	"20210630"	2:43
135.	"20210701"	2:13
136.	"20210702"	2:05
137.	"20210702 2"	5:07
138.	"20210704"	3:46
139.	"20210709"	2:22
140.	"20210713"	0:43
141.	"20210714"	2:59
142.	"20210720"	3:33
143.	"20210720 2"	1:53
144.	"20210722"	2:12
145.	"20210722 2"	2:46
146.	"20210813"	1:02
147.	"20210815"	2:29
148.	"20210818"	1:04
149.	"20211121"	2:33
150.	"20211121 2"	2:47
151.	"20211122"	2:30
152.	"20211126"	1:58
153.	"20211128"	2:02
154.	"20211128 2"	2:16
155.	"20211129"	2:20
156.	"20211129 2"	1:47
157.	"20211129 3"	2:32
158.	"20220122"	2:07
159.	"20220128"	1:54
160.	"20220129"	2:40
161.	"20220201"	2:11
162.	"20220202"	2:57
163.	"20220202 2"	2:25
164.	"20220204"	2:52
165.	"20220223"	2:28
166.	"20220328"	2:01
167.	"20220329"	1:31
168.	"20220329 2"	2:04
169.	"20220329 3"	2:51
170.	"20220330"	1:40
171.	"20220331"	2:15
172.	"20220401"	2:27
173.	"20220422"	2:29
174.	"20220507"	1:49
175.	"20220508"	1:40
176.	"20220609"	5:24
177.	"20221102 The Truth"	3:24
178.	"20221103"	1:08
179.	"20221118"	2:23
180.	"20221118 2"	0:34
181.	"20221119"	2:48
182.	"20221120"	2:28
183.	"20221120 2"	0:55
184.	"20221121"	2:05
185.	"20221122"	2:13
186.	"20221124"	2:21
187.	"20221125"	2:28
188.	"20221126"	2:25
189.	"20221127"	2:24
190.	"20221129"	2:11
191.	"20221213"	2:21
192.	"20221217"	4:05
193.	"20221217 2"	4:51
194.	"20230102"	2:26
195.	"20230103"	2:15
196.	"20230105"	2:41
197.	"20230108"	2:24
198.	"20230109"	3:09
199.	"20230114"	2:21
Total length:		523:20

== Personnel ==
- Mac DeMarco

== Charts ==
Chart performance for One Wayne G
Chart (2023)	Peak position
Canadian Albums (Billboard)	38
French Albums (SNEP)	158
US Billboard 200	56
US Independent Albums (Billboard)	8
US Top Alternative Albums (Billboard)	10
US Top Rock Albums (Billboard)	10
