= Here Comes the Cowboy =

Studio album by Mac DeMarco
- Released: May 10, 2019
- Recorded: 2018–2019
- Studios: Los Angeles, California
- Genre: Indie rock
- Length: 46:32
- Labels: Mac's Record Label, Caroline Distribution
- Producer: Mac DeMarco

Mac DeMarco chronology
This Old Dog (2017)	Here Comes the Cowboy (2019)	Five Easy Hot Dogs (2023)

Singles from Here Comes the Cowboy
- 1. "Nobody" Released: March 5, 2019; 2. "All of Our Yesterdays" Released: April 2, 2019; 3. "On the Square" Released: May 7, 2019

Here Comes the Cowboy is the fourth studio album by singer-songwriter and multi-instrumentalist Mac DeMarco, released on May 10, 2019, through Mac's Record Label.

== Background ==
DeMarco recorded Here Comes the Cowboy at his house, specifically in his garage, based in Los Angeles. He played all the instruments except for some keyboard playing, by bandmate Alec Meen. His sound engineer Yakitori Sentar, helped him arrange the tracks. While recording, DeMarco said that it was raining, in which raindrops can be heard through the recording, hitting his garage windows.

In a DIY interview, DeMarco wanted Cowboy to sound like a "demo record", saying "That was maybe the thing, you can't keep tweaking to get to that, you have to let it rest."

DeMarco talked about the production the album, saying

"That’s the funny thing with this record: most of the writing for it, I would just sit down and do something on this thing, and something over here, and a little drum, and sing a little bit, and usually I mean, the song feels finished the first time I put it down. It’s like there’s the idea, — some of the things I change a little bit. But the initial sketch of it is always the most organic feeling to me. There’s a difference in my mind between the song being finished, and the recording being finished, and the recording part was what drove me. I would fall in love with the initial the way it sounds. It’s kind of weird, I just popped it up and here you go, and then to try and be like, “Well now I have to make it sound a little fancier so like people will… you know… so it like doesn’t sound like shit.” And then there’s that teeter totter of, “But I want it to have the garbage aspect that it had when it was born."

The title may be in reference to the 2003 album by Animal Collective originally called Here Comes the Indian.

== Critical reception ==
Professional ratings
Aggregate scores
Source	Rating
AnyDecentMusic?	6.3/10
Metacritic	69/100
Review scores
Source	Rating
AllMusic	3/5 stars
The Guardian	3/5 stars
The Independent	2/5 stars
Mojo	4/5 stars
NME	4/5 stars
The Observer	3/5 stars
Pitchfork	6.7/10
Q	4/5 stars
Rolling Stone	3.5/5 stars
Uncut	8/10

Here Comes the Cowboy received polarized reviews upon release from critics and fans. While some critics noted a musical maturity for DeMarco and the minimalist production, most critics were divided on the album's slower pace and lack of focus. Thomas Hobbs of NME said of the album, "Here Comes the Cowboy suggests Mac DeMarco is ready to explore more mature themes and grow beyond the slacker image he has helped turn into a pop-culture staple. This record's slower pace won't be for everybody, just as unassuming This Old Dog wasn't, but, should you let it, this record will transport you somewhere calm and reflective. At a time of great chaos, that sure sounds good to me." Rolling Stone's Joe Levy called the songs "stark, meditative, lonely, and stubbornly isolated, like spending 45 minutes petting a cat. A static search for comfort."

In a generally mixed review, Timothy Monger of AllMusic said of the album, "With its camera phone happy-face button cover and minimalist production, Here Comes the Cowboy is a mixed bag of a record beset by an overall aimlessness where some crafty low-key gems have to share the bus with a few inane clunkers that probably should have stayed in the vault." Rachel Aroesti of The Guardian noted that "Here Comes the Cowboy may retain some of the disarming simplicity and emotional universality that has become DeMarco's trademark, but it is ultimately an album that fails to welcome the listener warmly into its world."

=== Year-end rankings ===
Publication	List	Rank	Ref.
GQ (Russia)	The 20 Best Albums of 2019	—N/a	

== Commercial performance ==
Here Comes the Cowboy debuted at number 10 on the US Billboard 200 with 27,000 album-equivalent units, of which 20,000 were pure album sales. It is DeMarco's first US top 10 album.

In January 2023, the track "Heart to Heart" became a viral hit on TikTok. As a result, the song became DeMarco's first to chart on the Billboard Hot 100, debuting at #98, reaching #83 after achieving over 5.8 million streams within a week in the US.

== Track listing ==
All tracks are written by Mac DeMarco.

No.	Title	Length
1.	"Here Comes the Cowboy"	3:00
2.	"Nobody"	3:32
3.	"Finally Alone"	2:25
4.	"Little Dogs March"	2:29
5.	"Preoccupied"	4:00
6.	"Choo Choo"	2:39
7.	"K"	3:33
8.	"Heart to Heart"	3:31
9.	"Hey Cowgirl"	2:16
10.	"On the Square"	3:29
11.	"All of Our Yesterdays"	4:04
12.	"Skyless Moon"	4:05
13.	"Baby Bye Bye"	7:29
Total length:		46:32

Notes

- "Heart to Heart" features uncredited vocals by Mac Miller.

== Personnel ==
Adapted from the album liner notes.

- Mac DeMarco – all instruments and vocals, production, mixing, and engineering

== Charts ==
Chart (2019)	Peak position
Australian Albums (ARIA)	25
Belgian Albums (Ultratop Flanders)	22
Belgian Albums (Ultratop Wallonia)	98
Canadian Albums (Billboard)	24
Dutch Albums (Album Top 100)	42
French Albums (SNEP)	112
Irish Albums (IRMA)	37
Lithuanian Albums (AGATA)	6
Scottish Albums (Official Charts)	15
Swiss Albums (Schweizer Hitparade)	58
UK Albums (Official Charts)	23
US Billboard 200	10
US Independent Albums (Billboard)	2
US Top Alternative Albums (Billboard)	2
US Top Rock Albums (Billboard)	3
