= Guitar (Mac DeMarco album) =

Studio album by Mac DeMarco
- Released: August 22, 2025
- Recorded: November 16–28, 2024
- Studios: Mac's home studio, Los Angeles, California
- Length: 30:54
- Label: Mac's Record Label
- Producer: Mac DeMarco

Mac DeMarco chronology
One Wayne G (2023)	Guitar (2025)

Singles from Guitar
- 1. "Home" Released: June 24, 2025; 2. "Holy" Released: July 22, 2025; 3. "Phantom" Released: August 19, 2025

Guitar is the sixth studio album by Canadian musician Mac DeMarco, released on August 22, 2025. Three promotional singles were issued from the album: "Home", released on June 24, 2025, "Holy", released on July 22, 2025, and "Phantom", released on August 19, 2025. Tours across North America and Europe to support the album were also announced.

== Background ==
In 2023, following Mac DeMarco's release of One Wayne G, there was speculation that DeMarco would be retiring from music in reference to him telling an audience in 2022 that "After this tour, there's nothing on the books. So who knows, maybe I'll never be back." DeMarco responded these rumors during an appearance on Emma Chamberlain's podcast where he revealed plans to focus on a new album now that he was done with One Wayne G, adding that he had a new idea for a future album and that "it's going to be good".

In 2024, DeMarco recorded demos for an album called Hear The Music. Due to his dissatisfaction with the album's recording process, DeMarco shelved the album. In November 2024, DeMarco wrote and recorded a new batch of songs in his home studio in Los Angeles over the course of twelve days, which were mastered by David Ives.

On April 8, 2025, DeMarco announced that he would be going on a tour across the United States, Canada, as well as Europe between August and December 2025. The tour is set to begin following the release of a new album that he additionally announced will be released in August 2025. The title of the album, Guitar, was revealed on June 24, 2025, along with its track listing and the release of its lead single, "Home", along with a music video for the track. On July 22, DeMarco released another single from the album, "Holy", along with another music video. A third single, "Phantom", was released on August 19.

DeMarco has said that Guitar is "a close representation of where I'm at in my life today as I can manage on paper".

== Reception ==
Professional ratings
Aggregate scores
Source	Rating
AnyDecentMusic?	6.9/10
Metacritic	76/100
Review scores
Source	Rating
AllMusic	3.5/5 stars
Clash	8/10
Exclaim!	8/10
The Independent	3/5 stars
Mojo	4/5 stars
Paste	6.7/10
Pitchfork	7.8/10
The Skinny	3/5 stars
Slant Magazine	3/5 stars
Uncut	8/10

Guitar received positive reviews from critics. On Metacritic, the album got assigned a 76 out of 100, indicating "generally favorable reviews", from 15 critic scores.

Exclaim! writer Dylan Barnabe gave a positive review, comparing it to a "late summer harvest", and that Mac "yields some of his most mature, sweet, and ripe fruit on his recent album". Pitchfork writer Grayson Haver Currin wrote that the songs that Mac performs are "endearing and affecting", while looking at the "wreckage of his past" and imagining a "sweeter future".

Paste writer Sam Rosenberg gave a mixed review. He wrote "On his wistful, acoustic-heavy sixth album, the Canadian rocker strips his sound down to its barest elements, but the minimalist approach doesn’t quite play to his strengths."

== Track listing ==
All tracks are written by Mac DeMarco.

Side A
No.	Title	Length
1.	"Shining"	3:08
2.	"Sweeter"	2:59
3.	"Phantom"	1:50
4.	"Nightmare"	2:16
5.	"Terror"	3:03
6.	"Rock and Roll"	3:02

Side B
No.	Title	Length
1.	"Home"	2:11
2.	"Nothing at All"	3:16
3.	"Punishment"	2:00
4.	"Knockin'"	2:20
5.	"Holy"	2:24
6.	"Rooster"	2:25
Total length:		30:54

== Personnel ==
Credits adapted from the album's liner notes and Tidal.

- Mac DeMarco – production
- David Ives – mastering
- Jamie Dutcher – layout

== Charts ==
Chart performance for Guitar
Chart (2025)	Peak position
Australian Vinyl Albums (ARIA)	17
Belgian Albums (Ultratop Flanders)	173
French Rock & Metal Albums (SNEP)	16
Portuguese Albums (AFP)	152
Scottish Albums (Official Charts)	24
UK Albums Sales (OCC)	39
UK Independent Albums (Official Charts)	10
US Billboard 200	173
US Independent Albums (Billboard)	26
US Top Rock & Alternative Albums (Billboard)	42
