= This Old Dog =

Studio album by Mac DeMarco
- Released: May 5, 2017
- Recorded: 2016
- Studios: Jizz Jazz Studios (Queens, New York and Los Angeles, California)
- Genres: Indie rock; lo-fi; jangle pop; folk
- Length: 42:24
- Labels: Captured Tracks, Royal Mountain Records
- Producer: Mac DeMarco

Mac DeMarco chronology
Another One (2015)	This Old Dog (2017)	Here Comes the Cowboy (2019)

Singles from This Old Dog
- 1. "My Old Man" Released: January 31, 2017; 2. "This Old Dog" Released: January 31, 2017; 3. "On the Level" Released: April 11, 2017; 4. "One More Love Song" Released: April 27, 2017

This Old Dog is the third studio album by singer-songwriter and multi-instrumentalist Mac DeMarco, released on May 5, 2017 through Captured Tracks. Following the release of Another One, DeMarco moved from his isolated Queens home to a house in Los Angeles to create the album. The album spawned two singles in January, "My Old Man" and "This Old Dog", which are the two first tracks on the album. The singles "On The Level" and "One More Love Song" were released in April 2017. The album leaked on April 13, 2017.

== Recording ==
DeMarco recorded This Old Dog while moving to Los Angeles. He describes the experiences and time it took to develop and make the album:

"I demoed a full album, and as I was moving to the West Coast I thought I'd get to finishing it quick. But then I realized that moving to a new city and starting a new life takes time. And it was weird, because usually I just write, record, and put it out; no problem. But this time, I wrote them and they sat. When that happens, you really get to know the songs. It was a different vibe."

== Reception ==
Professional ratings
Aggregate scores
Source	Rating
AnyDecentMusic?	7.7/10
Metacritic	79/100
Review scores
Source	Rating
AllMusic	4/5 stars
The A.V. Club	B−
The Guardian	4/5 stars
Mojo	4/5 stars
NME	4/5 stars
The Observer	4/5 stars
Pitchfork	7.9/10
Q	4/5 stars
Rolling Stone	3/5 stars
Uncut	8/10

This Old Dog was met with positive reviews from music critics. On Metacritic, which assigns a weighted mean rating out of 100 from mainstream critics, the album got a 79 out of 100, out of 24 reviews, which indicates "generally favorable reviews".

The title track garnered the Best New Track title from Pitchfork with writer Marc Hogan calling it a "shaggy ode to romantic constancy, come what may".

In his review for the album, Mark Richardson of Pitchfork writes, "DeMarco seems to kick back and let everything fall into place, but his music demonstrates a relentless devotion to craft, with all the fundamentals intact."

=== Accolades ===
Publication	Accolades	Rank	Ref.
Exclaim	Top 20 Pop & Rock Albums of 2017	12	
Les Inrockuptibles	Best Albums of 2017	7	
Noisey	The 100 Best Albums of 2017	100	
Rough Trade	Albums of the Year	30	

== Track listing ==
All tracks are written by Mac DeMarco.

This Old Dog
No.	Title	Length
1.	"My Old Man"	3:41
2.	"This Old Dog"	2:30
3.	"Baby You're Out"	2:37
4.	"For the First Time"	3:02
5.	"One Another"	2:46
6.	"Still Beating"	3:01
7.	"Sister"	1:18
8.	"Dreams from Yesterday"	3:27
9.	"A Wolf Who Wears Sheeps Clothes"	2:49
10.	"One More Love Song"	4:01
11.	"On the Level"	3:47
12.	"Moonlight on the River"	7:02
13.	"Watching Him Fade Away"	2:23
Total length:		42:24

This Old Dog – iTunes Store pre-order bonus tracks
No.	Title	Length
14.	"My Old Man" (Instrumental)	3:40
15.	"This Old Dog" (Instrumental)	2:30
16.	"Baby You're Out" (Instrumental)	2:36
17.	"For the First Time" (Instrumental)	3:05
18.	"One Another" (Instrumental)	2:46
19.	"Still Beating" (Instrumental)	4:00
20.	"Dreams from Yesterday" (Instrumental)	3:27
21.	"A Wolf Who Wears Sheeps Clothes" (Instrumental)	2:47
22.	"One More Love Song" (Instrumental)	4:01
23.	"On the Level" (Instrumental)	3:45
24.	"Moonlight on the River" (Instrumental)	6:56

== Personnel ==
Adapted from the album liner notes.

- Mac DeMarco – all instruments and vocals, production, mixing, and engineering
- David Ives – mastering
- Shags Chamberlain – mixing

== Charts ==
Chart (2017)	Peak position
Australian Albums (ARIA)	23
Belgian Albums (Ultratop Flanders)	72
Belgian Albums (Ultratop Wallonia)	75
Canadian Albums (Billboard)	27
Dutch Albums (Album Top 100)	48
French Albums (SNEP)	144
Irish Albums (IRMA)	14
New Zealand Heatseekers Albums (RMNZ)	1
Portuguese Albums (AFP)	47
Scottish Albums (Official Charts)	19
UK Albums (Official Charts)	21
UK Independent Albums (Official Charts)	9
US Billboard 200	29
US Independent Albums (Billboard)	1
US Top Alternative Albums (Billboard)	2
US Top Rock Albums (Billboard)	6

== Certifications ==
Certifications for This Old Dog
Region	Certification	Certified units/sales
United Kingdom (BPI)	Gold	100,000^{‡}
United States (RIAA)	Platinum	1,000,000^{‡}
^{‡} Sales+streaming figures based on certification alone.
