= Five Easy Hot Dogs =

Studio album by Mac DeMarco
- Released: January 20, 2023
- Recorded: January 15–March 2022
- Studio: Various locations between Los Angeles to New York City
- Genre: Instrumental rock
- Length: 34:48
- Label: Mac's Record Label
- Producer: Mac DeMarco

Mac DeMarco chronology
Here Comes the Cowboy (2019)	Five Easy Hot Dogs (2023)	One Wayne G (2023)

Five Easy Hot Dogs is the fifth studio album by Canadian musician Mac DeMarco. A departure from the previous studio albums in DeMarco's discography, the album is entirely instrumental and was recorded during a road trip from Los Angeles to New York. It was announced on January 4, 2023, and released on January 20.

== Background ==
DeMarco recorded the album in 2022 during a road trip from Los Angeles and New York. During the road trip, he stopped smoking and drinking, which he said was "pretty fucking difficult". He booked multiple hotels during the trip, in which he stayed and recorded the songs in. For recording equipment, he used a Lynx Aurora interface, eight API 312 preamps, dynamic microphones, an old Neumann U47, and two Genelec monitors.

== Critical reception ==
Professional ratings
Aggregate scores
Source	Rating
AnyDecentMusic?	6.2/10
Metacritic	68/100
Review scores
Source	Rating
AllMusic	3/5 stars
Beats per Minute	73%
Clash	6/10
The Daily Telegraph	3/5 stars
Exclaim!	7/10
The Line of Best Fit	7/10
Mojo	4/5 stars
Pitchfork	6.0/10
PopMatters	6/10
Uncut	6/10

On Metacritic, the album received a 68, which indicates "generally favourable reviews", based on 11 reviews. In a positive review by Mojo, "This is no holding exercise. Instead, think beautifully conceived curio."

Beats Per Minute wrote, "Five Easy Hot Dogs is an incredibly addictive record that entices with its lightheartedness and almost weightlessness, which is aided by the absence of vocals and lyrics. It allows the listener to attribute their own meaning to these 14 compositions, while also being able to imagine DeMarco’s trip, driving town to town." Exclaim! Magazine writer Alex Hudson wrote "It's certainly not going to produce the next "Viceroy" or "Chamber of Reflection," but it's an exceedingly pleasant listen — the kind of thing that's the perfect soundtrack for working and studying, or to make chores a little more tolerable."

Pitchfork writer Daniel Bromfield wrote "Though each track is named for where it was recorded, there’s not much to distinguish one stop from another, and though you could connect the locations into a journey, these tracks don’t form an arc but play as if stacked atop one another."

== Point of view ==
In a Document interview, DeMarco said this about the album.

So many things are made with sample packs, with MIDI, on the computer—but I knew the record would sound like me. I only used the instruments I brought on the road. To me, the record sounds like an Ewok village.

== Track listing ==
All tracks are written by Mac DeMarco.

Five Easy Hot Dogs track listing
No.	Title	Length
1.	"Gualala"	2:43
2.	"Gualala 2"	2:26
3.	"Crescent City"	2:27
4.	"Portland"	3:05
5.	"Portland 2"	2:12
6.	"Victoria"	2:41
7.	"Vancouver"	2:37
8.	"Vancouver 2"	2:02
9.	"Vancouver 3"	2:47
10.	"Edmonton"	2:23
11.	"Edmonton 2"	2:43
12.	"Chicago"	2:24
13.	"Chicago 2"	2:12
14.	"Rockaway"	2:06
Total length:		34:48

== Personnel ==
- Mac DeMarco – instruments, production, mixing, recording
- David Ives – mastering

== Charts ==
Chart performance for Five Easy Hot Dogs
Chart (2023)	Peak position
Belgian Albums (Ultratop Flanders)	169
Lithuanian Albums (AGATA)	83
