= The Courtneys =

Canadian indie rock band

- Origin: Vancouver, BC, Canada
- Genres: Indie rock, indie pop
- Years active: 2010–present
- Labels: Flying Nun, Burger, Hockey Dad Records, Gnar Tapes
- Members: Sydney Koke; Courtney Loove; Jen Twynn Payne

The Courtneys is a Canadian indie rock band formed in Vancouver, British Columbia, in 2010. The band is composed of Sydney Koke (bass, vocals), Courtney Loove (guitar, vocals), and Jen Twynn Payne (drums, lead vocals).

== History ==
Sydney Koke and Jen Twynn Payne met in their hometown of Calgary, Alberta, in 2007. After becoming housemates, Twynn Payne began learning to play drums with then-boyfriend Patrick Flegel. Koke was impressed with her abilities and suggested they start a band, which became Puberty, a post-punk group with guitarist Nicole Brunel.

Puberty disbanded when Koke enrolled in a neuroscience PhD program at Duke University. Twynn Payne moved to Vancouver, British Columbia, shortly after to play drums in Makeout Videotape. Twynn Payne and Loove met and formed a synth-pop duo called Girls in Love, which quickly disbanded. Koke dropped out of Duke and moved to Vancouver to start a new band with Twynn Payne, who suggested they enlist Loove as the guitarist. The three jammed together for a summer before Loove moved to Montreal, Quebec, for a new job. After she returned eight months later, they became more serious, playing their first official show in 2011 as The Courtneys at Pat's Pub for a friend's birthday party. The band's name is both an homage to Loove ("the most modest member of the band") as well as a clique of "cool girls" at Koke's elementary school.

Their first album, The Courtneys, was intended to be a four-song EP. They ran ahead of schedule and recorded more material, and completed recording, mixing, and mastering within three days. It was released by Hockey Dad Records, and was quickly sold out of its initial pressing.

Their second album, The Courtneys II, developed over the next three years as the band refined their songcraft, revising and refining songs as they explored "what makes an ideal structure of a song." Their experimentation also affected the sound of the record; they auditioned six different mix engineers for the record, and instructed their mastering engineer to make it sound "like Teenage Fanclub on Bandwagonesque." The album garnered acclaim for its sound; Rolling Stone editor Rob Sheffield named it one of his top albums of 2017.

== Style ==
=== Musical style ===
The Courtneys describe their style as "slacker pop" and "artisanal grunge;" critics have categorized them as jangle-pop, garage pop, and surf rock. They are most commonly associated with the Dunedin sound, particularly Flying Nun artists such as The Clean; they became the first non-New Zealand band to sign with the label after thirty-five years. They cite Eddy Current Suppression Ring, Pavement, Dinosaur Jr., and Fugazi as inspirations, with Teenage Fanclub, Big Star, and Phoenix cited as particular influences on II. Shoegaze has also been cited as an influence, largely due to Courtney Loove's unique open tuning.

Lyrically, the band has been noted for their pop culture references. These include actors ("K.C. Reeves", about Keanu Reeves), movies and television shows (including "Lost Boys" and "90210"), and other musicians (the "mandatory suicide" refrain from "Manion" is a reference to the Slayer song of the same name; "Nu Sundae" is an oblique reference to Vancouver band Nü Sensae). The Courtneys II marked a change from the referential to the more personal; it's claimed to be "75% about crushes."

=== Visual style ===
Much like their songs, their videos are often referential. Their video for "90210" is an homage to Eddy Current Suppression Ring's "Which Way to Go," while "Silver Velvet" is a remake of Bailter Space's "Splat."

The band also takes a distinctive approach to marketing and merchandise. Their logo was developed for their rec baseball team (also called "The Courtneys"), whose baseball cap is visible on the cover of their first album. They have released other unique merchandise, including an air freshener.

== Discography ==
=== Studio albums ===
The Courtneys

- Released: 7 June 2013
- Format: LP, CD, cassette, digital download
- Label: Hockey Dad Records (LP, CD, digital), Burger Records and Gnar Tapes (cassette)

The Courtneys II

- Released: 17 February 2017
- Format: LP, CD, cassette, digital download
- Label: Flying Nun Records (LP, CD, digital), Burger Records (cassette)

=== EP ===
K.C. Reeves

- Released: 20 April 2012
- Format: Cassette
- Label: Green Burrito Records

=== Singles ===
90210

- Released: 27 December 2012
- Format: Digital download
- Label: Self-released

Lost Boys

- Released: 22 January 2014
- Format: EP, cassette, digital download
- Label: Hockey Dad Records (EP), Burger Records (cassette)

Mars Attacks (feat. Young Braised)

- Released: 4 November 2014
- Format: EP, digital download
- Label: Hockey Dad Records

=== Other appearances ===
CiTR Pop Alliance Compilation, Vol. 3 (CiTR compilation, limited to 300 copies)

- Released: 5 March 2013
- Format: LP
- Tracks: "90210"

Shake!Fest 3

- Released: 30 June 2016
- Format: Cassette, digital download
- Label: Shake! Records, Sweety Pie Records, Toska Tapes
- Tracks: "Lost Boys (Extended Version)"
