= Rock and Roll Night Club =

EP (Mini-album) by Mac DeMarco
- Released: March 13, 2012
- Recorded: 2011
- Studios: Jizz Jazz Studios (Montreal, Quebec)
- Genres: Indie rock; soft rock; garage rock; pop rock; hypnagogic pop; jangle pop; lo-fi; psychedelic funk
- Length: 26:51
- Label: Captured Tracks
- Producer: Mac DeMarco

Mac DeMarco chronology
Rock and Roll Night Club (2012)	2 (2012)

Rock and Roll Night Club is the debut extended play/mini-album from Canadian artist Mac DeMarco. It was recorded in 2011 in DeMarco's Montreal-based studio Jizz Jazz Studios and released through Captured Tracks on March 13, 2012.

== Composition ==
Rock and Roll Night Club combines elements of American soul, chopped and screwed music, glam rock, 1950s rock and roll, garage rock, new wave and Captured Tracks' signature jangle guitar pop sound. Pitchfork's Evan Minsker opined that, lyrically, "it's probably safe to assume that at least 80% of Night Club is laced with a meta joke that nobody's in on except DeMarco," and No Ripcord described his performance on the record as resembling a "hopelessly romantic swinger." DeMarco himself said Rock And Roll Night Club was a joke as well, saying that he was being "intentionally sketchy" in making what Elliott Sharp of the official site for Red Bull described as "over-the-top", "conceptual", "kooky", and overall "a trashy, sleazy rock album that celebrated rock's trashy, sleazy core."

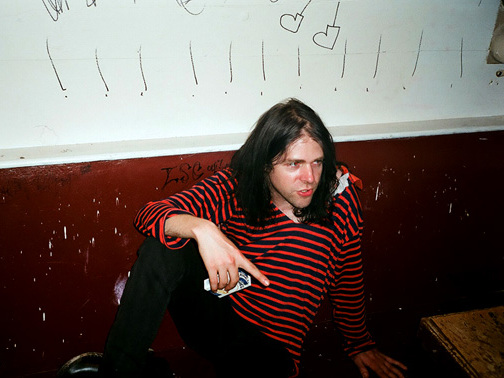
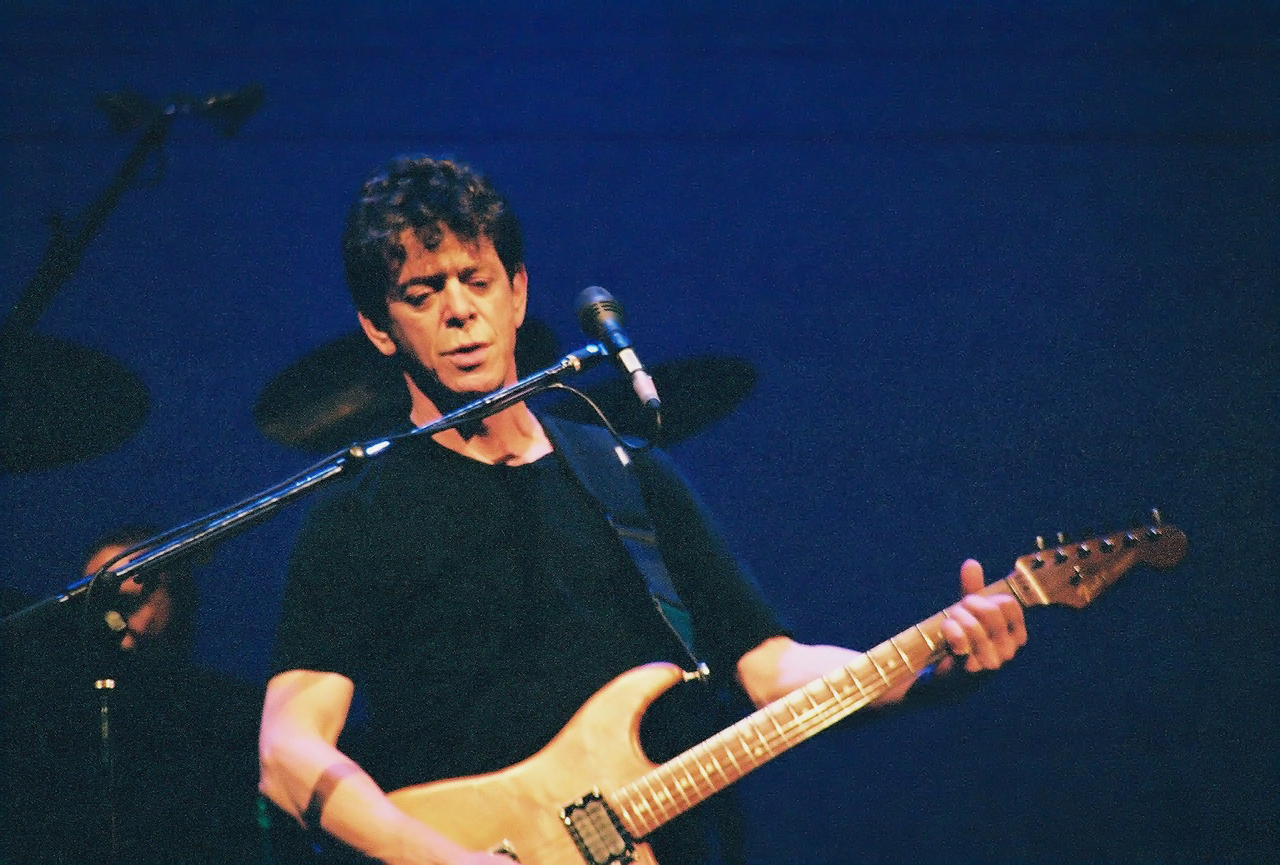
Rock and Roll Night Club garnered several comparisons to the works of Ariel Pink (left) and Lou Reed (right).

DeMarco's vocals on the first rough half of Rock and Roll Night Club were analyzed to be an impersonation of Elvis Presley. The first two songs, which No Ripcord compared to Charlie Feathers, "are both written in the point of view of a heartthrob whose eyes are dead set on his girl, whether he wants to play games with her, have an intimate night, or even make mental annotations on her country girl style." The Peter Sagar co-written "Baby's Wearing Blue Jeans" was called by Allmusic's Fred Thomas a "weird denim-fetish anthem", containing clean guitars and muffled drums in its instrumentation. The exact same vocal melody and soft singing is later brought into "One More Tear to Cry", which Thomas analogized as a Lou Reed song produced by Ariel Pink, and then "European Vegas", a song in which DeMarco "pleas his baby to stay one more night while a jangly chord chimes in with a dash of sorrow," according to No Ripcord. "Vegas" likewise reflects "One More Tear"'s use of slight variations of the same melody as the previous tracks. Thomas opined that "instead of being an annoyingly repetitive conceptual misfire, the identical melodies work in DeMarco's homespun glam thug sonnets in an if-it-ain't-broke kinda way, lending different shades of the same color to their respective songs." However, a new melody is introduced on "She's Really All I Need", a track which was lyrically compared by Loud and Quiet to Pavement, and instrumentally containing wobbly guitar riffs and "beachy" percussion, as well as the absence of DeMarco's distorted vocals.

Some say "Moving Like Mike" is about Brooklyn based video editor "Doc" Mike Kutsch, but it is most likely an out-of-key "dork-fest ode" to Michael Jackson that restores the overall vibe of the LP, after the "She's Really All I Need"-induced departure. The album's standard track list is closed with the Lou Reed-style funk song "I'm a Man", Initially titled "Eyeballs", DeMarco said he was trying to write about a man's lifestyle in Montreal with the song. The bonus track "Only You", lifted from the Makeout Videotape album Ying Yang was described by Thomas as near towards a modern take on indie rock, and sounding like a worn-out cassette demo recorded by the band Deerhunter around the time of their third studio album Microcastle. The song forms a Duane Eddy-esque twangy guitar line into a "garage stomp" by the time its "dark, seductive chorus" comes in. Minsker describes the two bonus tracks, "Only You" and "Me & Mine", as the "biggest surprise" of the album, comparing the two tracks to Real Estate and emphasizing the contrast of these two songs with the rest of the album. However, Minsker later resolved that there is a relatively small difference between the "goofy creep" who sings about "the boogie woogie woman lookin' my way" and the "straightforward crooner" who sings "I'm done crying over her."

== Recording ==
All of the tracks were recorded on a TASCAM 244 Portastudio 4 track cassette recorder except for one track, which was recorded on a Fostex VF-80. The recording took place in a Montreal apartment that Demarco and his girlfriend shared. The vocals and drums were all recorded with a Shure Beta 58A. The guitars and bass were all Direct input into the 244. The recording made extensive use of the 244's pitch control, Demarco described this to Tapeop Magazine: "I was trying to make a Ramones record... I thought, 'I'm going to do basic power chord riffs, I'm going to do solos, and I'm going to do it really fast.' It turned out I'm awful at it. When I slowed things down it was like, 'Ah, now I've got something'". Demarco also used a method of track summing to record more than the 4 track limit: "I learned to ping-pong the 4-track too, so I would do three tracks, bounce it to one, do another three, and hopefully the song would be done by then". Bouncing the tracks degraded the signal resulting in generation loss. This contributed to the sludgy lo-fi sound of the record and was partly inspired by the techniques of Joe Meek's I Hear a New World. Mixing was a challenge due to the limitations of the 244. For the guitars Demarco often turned the parametric equalizer up all the way and adjusted the gain to remove the bass and provide a space for them in the mix. Extreme panning was also used to separate the channels. An Alesis MicroVerb 4 was used for effects on guitars and vocals.

== Critical reception ==
Professional ratings
Aggregate scores
Source	Rating
Metacritic	79/100
Review scores
Source	Rating
The 405	8/10
AllMusic	4/5 stars
Beats Per Minute	78%
Loud and Quiet	8/10
No Ripcord	7/10
Pitchfork	7.2/10

At Metacritic, which assigns a weighted mean rating out of 100 to reviews from mainstream critics, the album received an average score of 79 based on 5 reviews, which indicates "generally favorable reviews". Fred Thomas of AllMusic opined: "Rock and Roll Night Club is a confusing record, but not a mess. On the contrary, it's so deeply calculated that the intentions and possible motivations of its songs are likely to be lost on most. This would be a problem if the good songs weren't so incredible and strange and the weak ones so immediately forgettable."

== Track listing ==
All tracks are written by Mac DeMarco, except where noted.

Standard edition
No.	Title	Length
1.	"Rock and Roll Night Club"	3:10
2.	"(96.7 The Pipe)"	0:34
3.	"Baby's Wearing Blue Jeans" (DeMarco, Peter Sagar)	3:33
4.	"One More Tear to Cry"	4:04
5.	"European Vegas"	3:17
6.	"(106.2 Breeze FM)"	1:00
7.	"She's Really All I Need"	3:03
8.	"Moving Like Mike"	2:57
9.	"Me and Jon, Hanging On"	2:41
10.	"I'm a Man"	2:32
Total length:		26:51

CD/Digital download bonus tracks
No.	Title	Length
11.	"Only You"	2:58
12.	"Me & Mine"	2:04
Total length:		31:53

== Personnel ==
Adapted from the liner notes.

- Mac DeMarco – vocals, guitar, bass guitar, drums, percussion, keyboards, composer
- Maddy Glowicki – background vocals on "European Vegas"
- Josh Bonati – mastering
- Ryan McCardie – cover design, layout
- Evan Prosofsky – cover photography
- Peter Sagar – co-writing on "Baby's Wearing Blue Jeans"

== Release history ==
Country	Date	Format	Label
Germany, United Kingdom, United States	March 13, 2012	Digital download	Captured Tracks
United States	March 27, 2012	CD, LP	Captured Tracks
Germany	March 30, 2012	LP	Captured Tracks
Germany	April 13, 2012	CD	Captured Tracks
United Kingdom	October 22, 2012	CD, LP	Captured Tracks
