= Another One (Mac DeMarco album) =

Studio album by Mac DeMarco
- Released: August 7, 2015
- Recorded: Late March 2015
- Studios: Jizz Jazz Studios in Far Rockaway, Queens, New York (DeMarco's House)
- Genre: Indie rock
- Length: 23:46
- Label: Captured Tracks
- Producer: Mac DeMarco

Mac DeMarco chronology
Salad Days (2014)	Another One (2015)	This Old Dog (2017)

Singles from Another One
- 1. "The Way You'd Love Her" Released: May 11, 2015; 2. "Another One" Released: June 16, 2015; 3. "I've Been Waiting for Her" Released: July 14, 2015; 4. "No Other Heart" Released: July 20, 2015

Another One is the debut/2nd unofficial mini-LP by Canadian singer-songwriter Mac DeMarco released on August 7, 2015 by Captured Tracks. The mini-LP was preceded by the release of four streaming singles on Spotify, "The Way You'd Love Her", "Another One", "I've Been Waiting for Her", and "No Other Heart". The title track was accompanied by a music video directed by DeMarco himself.

== Background and production ==
"I think people should be able to come along and have it mean something to them [...] It's talking about all different kinds of facets of being in love, being out of love, wanting love, not wanting love. So I think that it's not so important what they mean to me, as opposed to being there for other people to have and to enjoy, hopefully and maybe to reflect on, or whatever."

— DeMarco in July 2015

Another One was recorded by DeMarco in his home in Far Rockaway, Queens, New York between tour dates promoting his previous studio album Salad Days (2014). The songs were written within a week and recorded within the following week and a half. When Mac returned to his home after the tour, he recorded nine instrumental tracks. He planned to release these tracks the next day, and 24 hours later, he released the tracks on an album named "Some Other Ones" and published it on the music sharing website Bandcamp.

According to DeMarco, Another One is a concept album about love, specifically about being in love, not wanting love, etc.

== Release and promotion ==
The release of the mini-LP was announced on April 22, 2015. Along with the extended play, 43 tour dates, starting in April and ending in September, were announced. DeMarco is set to perform at several North American and European festivals and will also be headlining concerts on both continents. Dinner supported him on his first three dates, in Portland, Seattle and Vancouver. On May 11, DeMarco shared "The Way You'd Love Her", and announced 24 further tour dates, extending the festival and concert tour to November. Without permission, BBC Radio played the previously unheard song "Just to Put Me Down" from the mini-LP on June 9. A week later, DeMarco released a self-directed music video for the mini-LP's title track. He also encouraged fans to upload their own cover versions of the song and announced he would award 69 cents to the fan with the best submission. On July 8, DeMarco held a listening party and BBQ for fans in Brooklyn, New York. Attendees who offered donations to a food bank received BBQ food. DeMarco shared "I've Been Waiting for Her" on July 14. "No Other Heart" premiered on Annie Mac's BBC Radio 1 show Musical Hot Water Bottle on July 20. Another One was made available for streaming through NPR Music on July 31.

At the end of the final track, "My House by the Water," DeMarco recites his home address in New York City and invites fans for a cup of coffee. Two weeks after Another One had been leaked online, about 30 strangers had come to his house. Speaking about this in an interview, DeMarco said, "The way I rationalize it, to have the address you’ll have to listen to the album to the very end. Second, to even consider coming to my house, you have to be a kind of a superfan. And thirdly, it’s in such a weird part of New York that if they actually get there, they deserve a cup of coffee."

== Critical reception ==
Professional ratings
Aggregate scores
Source	Rating
AnyDecentMusic?	7.1/10
Metacritic	75/100
Review scores
Source	Rating
AllMusic	4/5 stars
The A.V. Club	B
The Guardian	4/5 stars
Mojo	4/5 stars
NME	8/10
The Observer	3/5 stars
Pitchfork	7.3/10
Q	3/5 stars
Rolling Stone	3.5/5 stars
Spin	7/10

At Metacritic, which assigns a weighted mean rating out of 100 to reviews from mainstream critics, the album received an average score of 75 based on 29 reviews, which indicates "generally favorable reviews".

=== Accolades ===
Publication	Accolade	Year	Rank
The Guardian	The Best Albums of 2015	2015	27
NME	NME'S Albums of the Year 2015	2015	27
Rough Trade	Albums of the Year 2015	2015	36

== Commercial performance ==
Another One debuted at number 25 on the Billboard 200 and number one on Top Rock Albums, making it DeMarco's highest-peaking release to date and first number-one release on the latter chart. It sold 13,000 copies in its first week, 6,000 of which were in the vinyl configuration. Its debut also represented DeMarco's best album sales week to date.

== Track listing ==
Another One – Standard edition
No.	Title	Length
1.	"The Way You'd Love Her"	2:36
2.	"Another One"	2:40
3.	"No Other Heart"	2:53
4.	"Just to Put Me Down"	3:18
5.	"A Heart Like Hers"	4:01
6.	"I've Been Waiting for Her"	2:47
7.	"Without Me"	2:57
8.	"My House by the Water"	2:34
Total length:		23:46

Another One – iTunes Store pre-order bonus tracks
No.	Title	Length
9.	"The Way You'd Love Her" (Instrumental)	2:36
10.	"Another One" (Instrumental)	2:40
11.	"No Other Heart" (Instrumental)	2:53
12.	"Just to Put Me Down" (Instrumental)	3:18
13.	"A Heart Like Hers" (Instrumental)	4:01
14.	"I've Been Waiting for Her" (Instrumental)	2:47
15.	"Without Me" (Instrumental)	2:57
16.	"My House by the Water" (Instrumental)	2:21
Total length:		47:19

== Personnel ==
Album personnel as adapted from album liner notes.

- Mac DeMarco – all instruments, production, recording, mixing
- Josh Bonati – mastering
- Kiera McNally – cover art
- Yuki Kikuchi – cover art (Another (Instrumental) One)
- Stefan Marx – typography

== Charts ==
Chart (2015)	Peak position
Australian Albums (ARIA)	24
Belgian Albums (Ultratop Flanders)	120
Belgian Albums (Ultratop Wallonia)	177
Canadian Albums (Billboard)	11
French Albums (SNEP)	124
Irish Albums (IRMA)	56
Scottish Albums (Official Charts)	33
UK Albums (Official Charts)	24
UK Independent Albums (Official Charts)	2
US Billboard 200	25
US Independent Albums (Billboard)	1
US Top Alternative Albums (Billboard)	1
US Top Rock Albums (Billboard)	1
US Indie Store Album Sales (Billboard)	2

== Release history ==
Country	Date	Edition	Format(s)	Label	Ref(s).
Worldwide	August 7, 2015	Standard	Digital download	Captured Tracks	
Worldwide	August 7, 2015	iTunes Store Pre-Order	Digital download	Captured Tracks	
Austria	August 7, 2015	Standard	CD; LP	Captured Tracks	
France	August 7, 2015	Standard	CD; LP	Captured Tracks	
Germany	August 7, 2015	Standard	CD; LP	Captured Tracks	
Italy	August 7, 2015	Standard	CD	Captured Tracks	
Italy	August 7, 2015	Standard, limited	LP	Captured Tracks	
United Kingdom	August 7, 2015	Standard	CD; LP	Captured Tracks	
United States	August 7, 2015	Standard	CD; LP	Captured Tracks	
United States	August 7, 2015	Special	LP + 12" record + slipmat	Captured Tracks	
