= Makeout Videotape =

Canadian lo-fi indie rock project

- Performing at the Victory Square Block Party in Vancouver, 2010

Background information
- Origin: Vancouver, British Columbia, Canada
- Genres: Lo-fi; indie rock; garage rock; psychedelic pop; surf rock
- Years active: 2008–2011
- Labels: Unfamiliar Records; Totally Disconnected; Thursday Friday
- Past members: Mac DeMarco; Alex Calder; Jen Clement; Natalie Gitt

Makeout Videotape was a Canadian lo-fi indie rock project formed in Vancouver in 2008 by Mac DeMarco and Alex Calder. DeMarco adopted the name while still living in his hometown of Edmonton; the project took shape after he moved to Vancouver, where Calder joined on drums and the recordings were supplemented at live shows by a rotating group of friends. Reliable sources disagree on whether it was a band or a recording alias — The New Yorker calls it "the name Makeout Videotape", while AllMusic refers to "the group" — a difference the participants themselves encouraged, since DeMarco described the recordings as "pretty much me with some by Alex".

The project released a self-recorded debut EP, Heat Wave!, in 2009, which sold out its run of 500 copies, and a full-length album, Ying Yang, in December 2010. Signed to the Toronto independent Unfamiliar Records and covered by college radio and by alternative weeklies in Vancouver and Toronto, the project toured North America with labelmates Japandroids. The Georgia Straight rated Heat Wave! four and a half stars and Now rated Ying Yang three.

The project ended in 2011, when DeMarco relocated to Montreal and began performing under his own name. Ying Yang was reissued on vinyl in 2015, bringing the project renewed attention from Pitchfork, NME and other outlets after DeMarco's solo breakthrough.

== History ==
=== 2008–2009: Formation and Heat Wave! ===
DeMarco finished high school in Edmonton in 2008 and moved west to Vancouver, settling in the Killarney neighbourhood, where he worked at a coffee shop and recorded songs alone in his garage. One of the first was "Heat Wave!", which became the title track of the project's debut release. Calder, a friend of DeMarco's from Edmonton, also moved to Vancouver and took on drumming duties; the pair had been playing together since they were both about fifteen. DeMarco said Calder joined "to make some kind of an official physical presence", with other friends filling in as needed. Jen Clement, a Calgary musician who had met DeMarco when her punk band Puberty toured to Vancouver, shared the drumming duties with Calder, and the title track of Heat Wave! was reviewed as featuring Natalie Gitt on tom-toms.

The self-released Heat Wave! EP appeared in 2009 and sold out its run of 500 copies. Reviewing it that November for The Georgia Straight, the paper's critic rated it four and a half stars, wrote that its "ultra-fuzzed-out lo-fi will keep you toasty", and praised the "thumping blues swagger" of the opener "Slush Puppy Love", the jangly title track and the tape-deterioration hiss of "I Guess the Lord Is in New York", a Harry Nilsson cover; the paper also noted that "the local duo knows its way around a pop hook" and named "Basketball Kids" its recommended download. Discorder called the songs "charming, catchy, jangly gems with melodies and hooks as strong as any in your parents' '60s pop songs, just drenched in distortion and fuzz". CKUW Stylus later described the pair of 2009–2010 releases as "quite the beachside party", recorded cheaply enough that "the chords ring in, pushing needles into the red".

Late in 2009 the project signed to Unfamiliar Records, a Toronto independent whose roster also included Japandroids, Brasstronaut and No Gold. Label co-manager Edo Van Breemen said he had been won over after seeing a show at the Astoria: "I think of them as a garage-y sound, but with very sophisticated songwriting. Personally, I think [front-man] Mac [DeMarco] is a bit of a songwriting genius… [h]e thinks it's pop music, [but] he uses a lot of weird jazz chords." DeMarco later described the signing as a chance encounter on the street — "I was like 'Hey, man, you should come to my show tomorrow'" — after which he asked to go on tour and was told to go with Japandroids. The resulting Canada–US tour with the labelmates followed that autumn, with the pair travelling in DeMarco's mother's Dodge Neon.

=== 2010: Eating Like a Kid, Weird Meats and touring ===
A second EP, Eating Like a Kid, followed in early 2010, alongside a seven-inch single, Weird Meats, issued by Unfamiliar with a track taken from the sold-out Heat Wave! EP, and a mixtape that the project sold only at its shows. Songs were circulated through Myspace and Bandcamp, and cassettes appeared on labels including Totally Disconnected. A further EP, Bossa Yeye, and the demos collection Eyeballing were also issued. The project recorded quickly and cheaply in this period: Eating Like a Kid was cut at a house on Powell Street in Vancouver, and other releases were made at the Killarney garage, with later material recorded at DeMarco's mother's house in Edmonton.

Reviewing Eating Like a Kid in February 2010, the Canadian publication Weird Canada — which ran its reviews in English and French — called it "a mesmerizing departure" from the project's earlier work, with hooks that "are intelligently buried" and melodies "floating atop rivers of reverberating guitars". CKUW Stylus heard DeMarco "going in so many directions" across the year, from the surf pop of "Swim Dream" to the 1960s doo-wop of "Deborah" to the "sober indie pop" of "Because I'm a Boy".

In June 2010 the project played Vancouver's Music Waste festival; previewing the event, Scout Magazine called them "one of Vancouver's best" and noted their 2 a.m. set at Goody. That April the project had toured western Canada, including a Winnipeg date opening for You Say Party at the Royal Albert. Reviewing an earlier Winnipeg show at the Lo Pub, CKUW Stylus described DeMarco stopping mid-song to coax a broken reverb pedal back to life, and ending a cover of Nilsson's "I Guess the Lord Must Be in New York" by yodelling over Calder's drums; the magazine noted that a tom and a snare were the project's entire drum kit.

=== 2010–2011: Ying Yang ===
In December 2010 the project released Ying Yang. The release was unconventional: DeMarco uploaded six tracks to Bandcamp without warning, then circulated a 13-track version among friends, offering the full set to anyone who emailed him. He explained that the sudden release was a way of breaking a long silence: "We didn't make very much money and I was just broke and tired, so I came back and lived at my mom's house for a while and didn't do much of anything. I just felt like telling the Internet we didn't die." Asked whether the six-track upload was an EP or an album, he said: "I just uploaded those ones and people started saying, 'EP? Full-length?' I was like, 'Ah, whatever.'"

Exclaim! noted that the earlier EP had been recorded by DeMarco alone, while the new material also featured Calder on drums and had "less swampy" production, most noticeably on the vocals. Reviewing the album, the same publication singled out "Island Groovies" and the "woozy, experimental" "Brian", finding the fidelity "distinctly clearer than the band's murky early work, with the hooks coming out sharper and more distinct". Now rated it three stars out of four, writing that "while there are few sonic surprises on Ying Yang, Makeout Videotape deserve a listen just for their songwriting chops", and naming "Because I'm a Boy" its top track.

By March 2011 DeMarco was telling interviewers he was "already kind of sick of it", having worked on the material for about a year and a half. Asked about the release, he said the plan had been a cassette first and vinyl through the label later: "We [just independently] released Ying Yang on a cassette. We might release it with our label on vinyl."

=== 2011: Montreal and the end of the project ===
The project wound down as DeMarco and Calder relocated to Montreal in February 2011, after a spell back in Edmonton. DeMarco cited cost and proximity among the reasons: "It's cheaper than Vancouver. It's nice and close to Toronto, New York [and] Chicago." He began recording and performing under his own name, later explaining that the decision was partly about the name itself: "By the time I got to Montreal I thought, 'Oh my god my band is called Makeout Videotape!' It's pretty hard to tell your grandparents that name… I figured I might as well change the name to my own, since it gives you a bit of freedom, and people don't think you're a band anymore." He recorded Rock and Roll Night Club and posted it to Bandcamp; Captured Tracks founder Mike Sniper heard the recordings and then saw the video for Ying Yang's "Only You", recalling: "I was really into the tracks, so then I saw the video for 'Only You' and I knew right then I'd have to sign this guy."

=== 2015: Reissue ===
Ying Yang received its first vinyl release on 20 August 2015 through Thursday Friday, in a limited edition of 1,200 12-inch copies. The reissue was reported by Pitchfork, NME, DIY, The Line of Best Fit and Exclaim!, among others. DIY described the album as "the last of five records released by the band in just one year".

=== Aftermath ===
"Only You", the second track on Ying Yang, followed DeMarco into his solo career and became one of the project's most enduring songs; Canadian press continued to identify him as the musician who "used to live in Vancouver and performed as Makeout Videotape". Calder, the project's drummer, went on to a solo career on Captured Tracks and also recorded as Mold Boy and Collage Party; BeatRoute noted that he had previously played in Edmonton "as part of other bands (notably Makeout Videotape with Mac DeMarco)". Asked in 2013 whether he tired of being questioned about his former collaborators, Calder said: "You never really feel nervous playing other people's music. If you screw up, it's totally all their fault and you're fine."

== Musical style ==
Makeout Videotape's music was lo-fi indie rock built from limited means; one reviewer counted the setup as "one guitar, one floor tom and one snare drum". DeMarco said the recordings sounded rough only because the pair did not know how to record, and described the early Vancouver material as having been made "inspired by Jonathan Richman, Arthur Russell, the Beatles and Harry Nilsson". The lo-fi approach was a reaction as much as a limitation: DeMarco said his previous Edmonton band had tried for "nice, clean, indie rock" in the manner of Yo La Tengo and Pavement, taking a long time over tidy recordings, before he noticed that "all my friends were into these really crappy recorded bands". Reviewers heard blues rock in the earliest material — The Georgia Straight compared the opener "Slush Puppy Love" to the Black Keys — alongside surf rock, 1960s doo-wop and power pop. CKUW Stylus noted that the project moved from surf pop to doo-wop to "the sober indie pop of 'Because I'm a Boy'" within a single year, and that "even the recordings sound cleaner", while Now found that the project "gracefully slip in more complex musical ideas without going too far down the prog path". DeMarco resisted the garage label, and Unfamiliar's Edo Van Breemen likewise described the songs as "garage-y" in sound but "very sophisticated" in writing.

== Discography ==
EPs

- Heat Wave! (2009)
- Eating Like a Kid (2010)
- Bossa Yeye (2010)

Album

- Ying Yang (2010)

Singles

- Weird Meats (2010, 7-inch, Unfamiliar)

Compilations

- Eyeballing (2010)
