= I Wanna Run Barefoot Through Your Hair =

Studio album by Christopher Owens
- Released: October 18, 2024
- Length: 49:49
- Label: True Panther
- Producers: Christopher Owens; Doug Boehm; Ariel Rechtshaid; Jacob Portrait

Christopher Owens chronology
| Chrissybaby Forever (2015) | I Wanna Run Barefoot Through Your Hair (2024) |

Singles from I Wanna Run Barefoot Through Your Hair
- 1. "I Think About Heaven" Released: July 30, 2024; 2. "No Good" Released: August 12, 2024; 3. "This Is My Guitar" Released: September 9, 2024

I Wanna Run Barefoot Through Your Hair is the fourth studio album by American singer-songwriter Christopher Owens. It was released on October 18, 2024, through True Panther Records. It is his first album in nearly a decade, following the release of Chrissybaby Forever in 2015. Owens co-produced the album mainly in San Francisco with Doug Boehm. It was supported by three singles: "I Think About Heaven", "No Good" and "This Is My Guitar".

== Background and recording ==
I Wanna Run Barefoot Through Your Hair is Christopher Owens' first solo album in over nine years. It was conceived following a long period in which Owens suffered a motorbike crash, separated from his fiancée, and experienced homelessness and the death of his Girls bandmate Chet "JR" White. His last studio album was Chrissybaby Forever, which was released in May 2015 and was the final entry in a three-album contract with his record label, after which they dropped him. Owens called around and received no responses, realizing he was "no longer a hot buzz artist". He describes the time as one of panic over the prospect that "nobody was ever going to make another record with me". When he was seriously injured riding on his 1982 Honda MB5, his partner of seven years broke up with him and he was fired from the coffee shop job he took to pay his bills. He had refused to go to the hospital over fears of medical debt, leaving him unable to walk for a month. He was unable to afford rent in San Francisco and began living in his car. A first breakthrough came in 2017 when he performed a gig that he organized in Hong Kong, during which time he wrote the album's first track "No Good".

Owens and White remained in contact following the breakup of Girls. They had planned to reform Girls and make a new album. However, when they eventually convened and began recording demos together, Owens noticed that White struggled to do so: "It was the first time I'd seen him not be able to stay awake for a session. Not even to be able to hit record." Whereas Owens became sober in 2014, White's drug addiction persisted. Owens was reassured when White returned to his family home in Santa Cruz to improve his health. He figured he had just gotten to White at the wrong time and was confident that they would reconvene some months later. However, White died there in October 2020, aged 40, after his heart stopped. Several of the songs intended for that Girls album ended up on I Wanna Run Barefoot Through Your Hair. Owens co-produced the album in San Francisco with Doug Boehm. He also worked with producers Ariel Rechtshaid and Jacob Portrait in New York City on the track "This Is My Guitar". In a statement, Owens referred to the album as being about "a journey back to the center of myself."

The album's title refers to a quote that Owens misremembered James Stewart saying in the film It's a Wonderful Life (1946).

== Release ==
On July 30, 2024, Owens released the single "I Think About Heaven", his first new music in seven years following the 2017 EP Vante with his band Curls. I Wanna Run Barefoot Through Your Hair was officially announced on August 12, 2024. The single "No Good" was released the same day alongside an acoustic performance video. A third single, "This Is My Guitar", was released on September 9, 2024, also accompanied by an acoustic performance video. The album was released on October 18, 2024, by True Panther Records, the same label that released all of Girls' music.

== Critical reception ==
Professional ratings
Aggregate scores
| Source | Rating |
|---|---|
| Metacritic | 85/100 |
Review scores
| Source | Rating |
| AllMusic | 4.5/5 stars |
| DIY | 5/5 stars |
| No Ripcord | 8/10 stars |
| Paste | 8.1/10 |
| Pitchfork | 7.2/10 |
| Spectrum Culture | 84/100 |
| Uncut | 8/10 |

According to the review aggregator Metacritic, I Wanna Run Barefoot Through Your Hair received "universal acclaim" based on a weighted average score of 85 out of 100 from 7 critic scores.

Reviewing the album for AllMusic, Fred Thomas awarded it a four and a half out of five star rating and wrote that, "I Wanna Run Barefoot Through Your Hair highlights how Owens can write songs detailing life's harshest miseries and somehow twist them until the main takeaways are hope and gratitude. It's a rare feat, and Owens accomplishes it on many of these songs, making the album not just a collection of some of his strongest work but a humbling reminder to remember to be thankful for what we have while we have it." Joe Goggins of DIY gave the album 5 out of 5 stars, writing, "Christopher Owens has emerged from [the storm] with potentially one of the year's best records."

== Track listing ==
All tracks are written by Christopher Owens, except "I Think About Heaven" by David L. Rugely.

I Wanna Run Barefoot Through Your Hair track listing
| No. | Title | Length |
|---|---|---|
| 1. | "No Good" | 3:33 |
| 2. | "Beautiful Horses" | 5:03 |
| 3. | "I Think About Heaven" | 6:03 |
| 4. | "White Flag" | 5:02 |
| 5. | "I Know" | 6:16 |
| 6. | "So" | 2:52 |
| 7. | "This Is My Guitar" | 4:19 |
| 8. | "Distant Drummer" | 4:36 |
| 9. | "Two Words" | 4:50 |
| 10. | "Do You Need a Friend" | 7:15 |
| Total length: | | 49:49 |

== Personnel ==
Credits adapted from Bandcamp.

- Christopher Owens – vocals (all tracks), guitar (all tracks), keyboard (1, 2, 4, 6–10), bongos (track 3), harmonica (track 5), bass (track 7), production (all tracks)
- Cody Rhodes – drums (tracks 1–6, 8–10)
- Luke Bace – bass (tracks 1–6, 8–10)
- Derek Barber – guitar (tracks 1–6, 8–10)
- Buddy Ross – additional keyboard (track 7)
- Makeda – backing vocals (tracks 8, 10)
- Doug Boehm – production (tracks 1–6, 8–10), mixing (tracks 1–6, 8–10)
- Ariel Rechtshaid – production (track 7)
- Jacob Portrait – drums (track 7), production (track 7), mixing (track 7), engineering (track 7)
- Andrew Sarlo – engineering (track 7)
- Kyle Smith – engineering (track 7)
- Dave Cooley – mastering
