= Christopher Owens =

American singer-songwriter (born 1979)

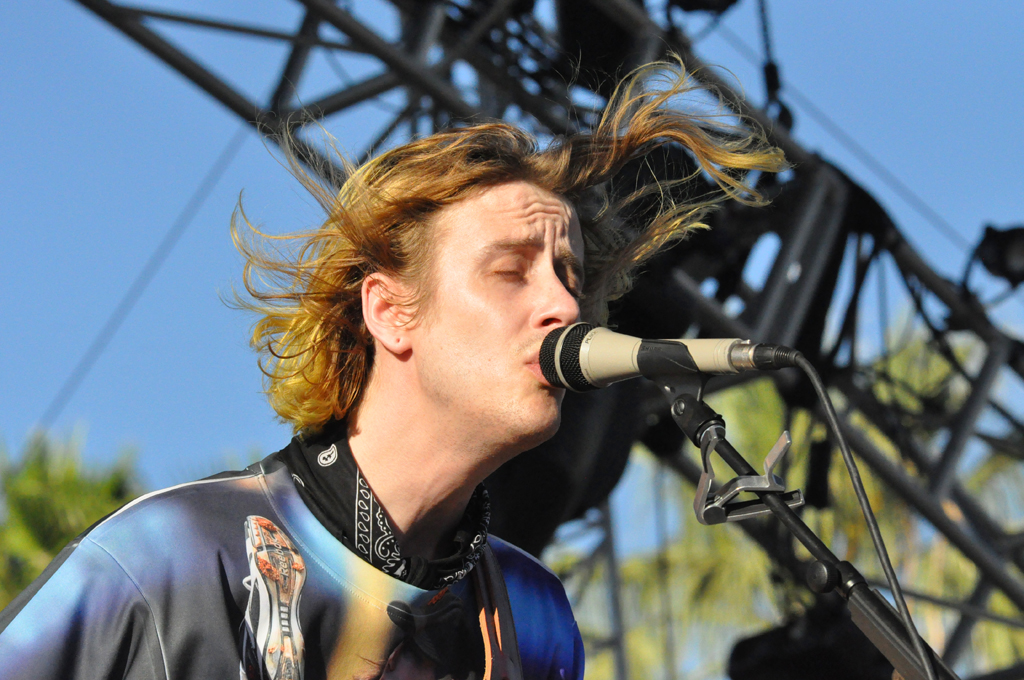
- Owens at Coachella in 2012

Background information
- Born: Christopher David Owens; July 13, 1979 (age 47); Miami, Florida, United States
- Genres: Indie rock, indie pop, garage rock
- Occupations: Singer, songwriter, musician
- Instruments: Vocals, guitar, keyboards, percussion
- Years active: 2001–present
- Labels: Fat Possum, Turnstile, True Panther

Christopher David Owens (born July 13, 1979) is an American singer, songwriter, and musician. He is best known as the frontman and songwriter for the now-defunct indie rock band Girls. He released his debut album as a solo artist, Lysandre, in January 2013. In September 2014, Owens released his second album, A New Testament. In May 2015, Owens released his third album, Chrissybaby Forever. In October 2024, Owens released his fourth album, I Wanna Run Barefoot Through Your Hair.

== Early life ==
Owens was born in Miami, Florida. At the time of his birth, both his parents were members of the Children of God traveling religious community. Shortly before Owens' birth his infant brother Steven died of pneumonia due to the reluctance of the church's members to seek professional medical assistance. In 1981, Owens' family left the United States to travel with the church and he lived "all over Asia" until he was ten, before traveling throughout Western Europe. Owens learned to play guitar in his early teens and would perform covers of Everly Brothers and The Fleetwoods songs on the street. At the age of sixteen, he left the church while based in Slovenia and followed his sister to Amarillo, Texas. Owens spent his first four years in Texas working as a nighttime shelf stocker in Albertson's grocery store as well as in various restaurants. In 2001 he met artist Stanley Marsh 3, who hired him first as a lawn mower and later as a personal assistant. After nine years in Texas, Owens moved to San Francisco, California with the intention of becoming a "famous painter". There he met musicians Matt Fishbeck and Ariel Pink and joined their band Holy Shit as a touring guitarist. In 2007, Owens was inspired to form his own band and began writing songs for the first time at the age of 28. In San Francisco, Matt Fishbeck introduced him to Chet JR White. The duo would go on to form the band Girls in 2007.

== Music career ==
With Girls, Owens released two studio albums and an EP. Girls' first recordings were released as a single, "Lust For Life", on the independent label True Panther Sounds in 2008. Album was released in 2009.

The band released their second full-length album Father, Son, Holy Ghost on September 9, 2011, in UK/Europe and on September 13 in the USA.

In July 2012, Owens announced via his Twitter feed that he was leaving the band and would continue to record music under his own name.

On October 25, 2012, Owens announced that he would release his debut solo album, titled Lysandre, in January 2013. The album was recorded with a group of musicians in Los Angeles with producer Doug Boehm - who produced Girls' Father, Son, Holy Ghost. Owens released a statement with the announcement of Lysandre's release explaining that the album tells the story - in track sequence - of the first Girls tour in 2008 and takes its title from a girl he met in France during that trip. His statement calls the album "a coming of age story, a road trip story, a love story." The album and new solo career have allowed Owens to satisfy his own creative whims, and although he is sitting on a couple records worth of new material, "he admits that the gap between writing and recording gives him the distance to reappraise a song's quality."

Owens, along with the seven musicians who appear on the album, performed Lysandre in full at San Francisco's The Lodge at the Regency Center on November 9, 2012. He was also featured on the cover of Issue #83 of The Fader. He released his second solo album, A New Testament, on September 30, 2014, in the US and September 29 worldwide.

In December 2016, he announced on Twitter that he has formed a new band named Curls with two other musicians, Cody Rhodes and Luke Baće. Together, they released the 2017 EP titled Vante.

On July 30, 2024, Owens announced his return to Girls' home label, True Panther, and released his first song in seven years, "I Think About Heaven". He released his fourth studio album, I Wanna Run Barefoot Through Your Hair, on October 18, 2024.

== Fashion ==
In September 2012, it was announced by Saint Laurent Paris (formerly Yves Saint Laurent) that Owens would be the face of their Spring/Summer campaign, to be shot by returning Creative Director Hedi Slimane. A promotional video was released during Paris Fashion Week featuring multiple black and white images of Owens edited to the audio of Girls' "Just A Song".

In October 2013, Owens became the new face of the H&M campaign promoting the Isabel Marant range.

Owens shared that these modeling gigs allowed him to recoup the financial loss of touring Lysandre––there were nine people in his band, and to maintain an intimate atmosphere, he had refused to play festivals.

== Discography ==
With Girls

- Album (2009)
- Broken Dreams Club (2010)
- Father, Son, Holy Ghost (2011)

Solo albums

- Lysandre (2013)
- A New Testament (2014)
- Chrissybaby Forever (2015)
- I Wanna Run Barefoot Through Your Hair (2024)

With Curls

- Vante (2017)

Solo singles

- "Lysandre" (2012, Fat Possum Records)
- "Here We Go" (2013, Turnstile)
- "Nothing More Than Everything To Me" (2014, Turnstile)
- "It Comes Back To You" (2014, Turnstile)
- "I Think About Heaven" (2024, True Panther Sounds)
- "No Good" (2024, True Panther Sounds)
- "This Is My Guitar" (2024, True Panther Sounds)
