= Lemonade (band) =

American alternative dance band

- Origin: San Francisco, California, U.S.
- Genres: Alternative dance, world music, Caribbean music
- Years active: 2005–2018
- Labels: Cascine, True Panther Sounds, Matador
- Members: Callan Clendenin; Ben Steidel; Alex Pasternak
- Website: Lemonade Tumblr

Lemonade was an alternative dance band from San Francisco, California, now residing in Brooklyn, New York. The band's music consists of an eccentric amalgam of electronic, world, and rock music influences, ranging from dubstep to Caribbean. The band was formed in 2005 and is made up of vocalist Callan Clendenin, bassist Ben Steidel, and drummer Alex Pasternak. The group gained notoriety after moving to New York and releasing its self-titled debut in 2008, and Pure Moods EP in 2010. Several tracks from each of their releases have also been remixed by well-known artists like Delorean, Gold Panda, and Twin Shadow.

== History ==
The band formed in 2005, in San Francisco, after the three were booked to play a live show two weeks after forming, having previously written no material. The first set, though mostly improvised, was well received, motivating the band to continue making music. With band members influenced by a variety of musical forms, the band soon found appeal among a diverse array of genres, allowing them to play a wide range of venues throughout the Bay Area, in various settings. Upon moving to Brooklyn, the band found wider success after releasing its debut and playing shows with well-known acts like Delorean and Tanlines. They are scheduled to perform at the American Music Awards of 2014 during the pre-show on November 23, 2014.

The band signed with record label True Panther Sounds and released the follow-up to its debut album on May 29, 2012. The release of the album, Diver, coincided with North American tour dates opened for Neon Indian throughout the Spring.

== Discography ==
=== Albums ===
- Lemonade (2008, True Panther Sounds)
- Diver (2012)
- Minus Tide (2014, Cascine)

=== Singles ===
- "Big Weekend" (2009)

=== EPs ===
- Pure Moods EP (2010, True Panther Sounds)
