= Tanlines =

American indie duo

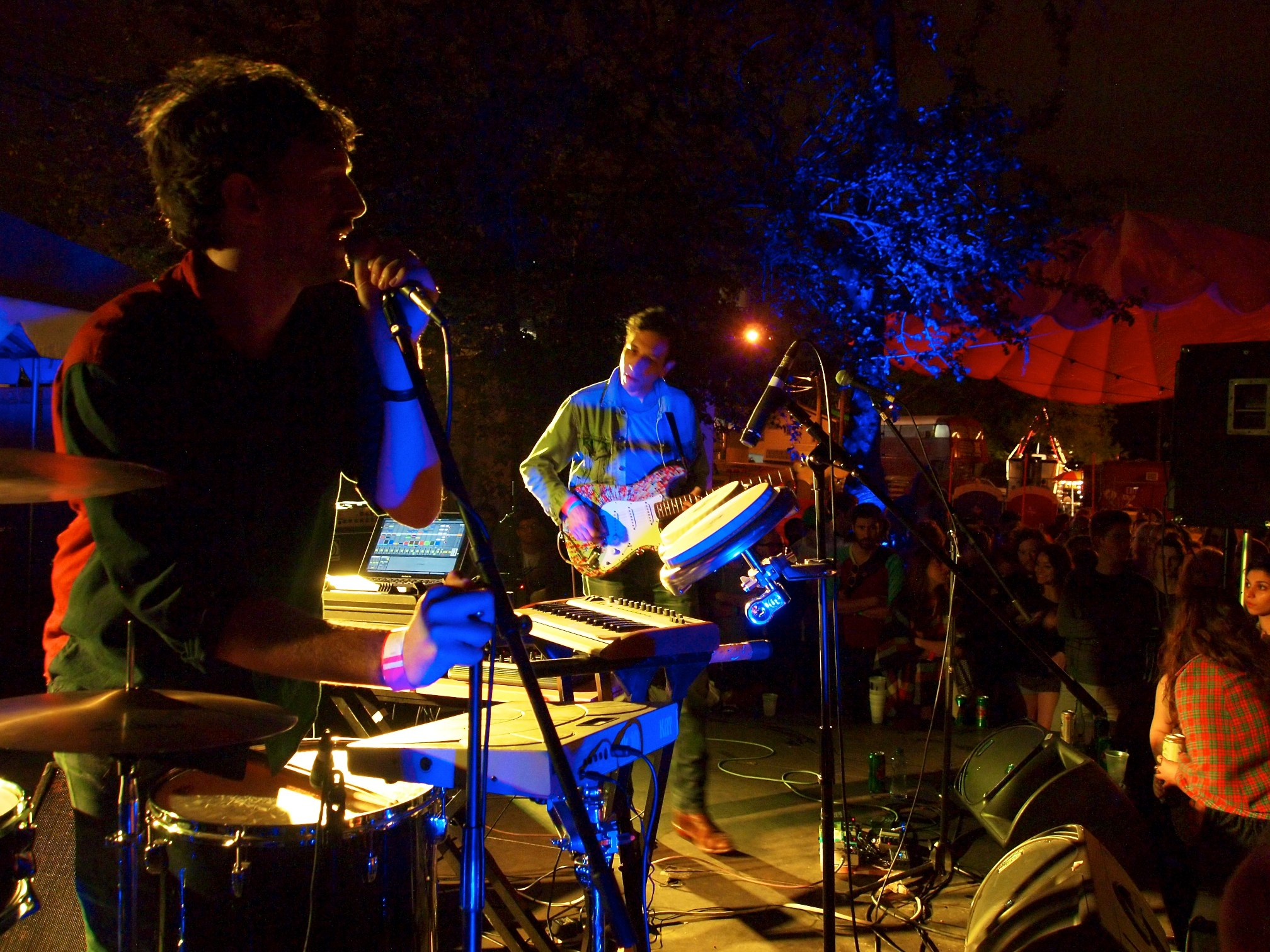
- Tanlines performing at South by Southwest in 2012

Background information
- Origin: Brooklyn, New York, United States
- Genres: Indie rock, experimental pop, electronic music, dance music
- Years active: 2008–present
- Labels: True Panther Sounds (distributed by Matador Records), Young Turks (distributed by XL Recordings)
- Members: Jesse Cohen; Eric Emm
- Website: tanlinesinternet.com

Tanlines is an American electronic music and indie rock duo from Brooklyn, New York composed of percussionist Jesse Cohen and guitarist and vocalist Eric Emm. Their influence is drawn from various genres including pop, indie, dance and world music. Tanlines' debut album Mixed Emotions was released on March 20, 2012, and reached No. 2 on the Billboard Heatseekers album chart. Tanlines' songs are represented by Downtown Music Publishing.

== History ==
=== Formation and early years (2008–2011) ===
Tanlines was formed in 2008 after Cohen and Emm worked together producing a song for Cohen's band, Professor Murder. Emm had previously worked as a producer for other bands with his brother Joshua Topolsky and had also performed in the bands Don Caballero and Storm & Stress in Brooklyn. In 2009, Tanlines opened several times on tour for Julian Casablancas.

After releasing several remixes for bands that included Au Revoir Simone, The Tough Alliance, El Guincho and Telepathe, the band collaborated with Salem to release a split EP entitled S.A.W. in early 2010, mostly in Brooklyn.

The band's first EP of their own music, Settings, was released in March 2010 and was praised by Pitchfork as "an enjoyable listen" and "a punchy introduction to what these guys do well". In November 2010, Tanlines released Volume On, a compilation of all of their released music up until that date and several other tracks and remixes.

The band has played with Vampire Weekend, The xx, Rick Ross, Yeasayer, Health and Delorean. They are from Brooklyn, NY.

=== Mixed Emotions (2012–present) ===
Tanlines' first full-length studio album, Mixed Emotions, was released on March 20, 2012, on True Panther Sounds. The album was described as "straddl[ing] the line between mainstream-indie and classicist pop" and "blend[ing] some dance floor-worthy pop gems with the sound of the 80s". The album was generally well-received as a strong debut and was praised as "some of [Tanlines'] most enjoyable work to date", but the band was also criticized for certain songs lacking a "big payoff" as well as for not "doing anything... that you can't hear another band doing just as well".

On the Billboard album charts, Mixed Emotions peaked at No. 2 on the Heatseekers chart and at No. 8 on the Dance/Electronic chart.

Rolling Stone named the track, All of Me the 43rd best song of 2012.

On February 21, 2023, the duo announced their first album in 8 years. Naming it "The Big Mess" releasing on May 19, 2023.

== Discography ==
=== Studio albums ===
- Mixed Emotions (2012, True Panther Sounds)
- Highlights (2015, True Panther Sounds)
- The Big Mess (2023, Merge Records)

=== EPs ===
- Settings (EP, 2010, True Panther Sounds)
- S.A.W. (7" split EP with Salem, 2010, Fader)

=== Singles ===
- "New Flowers" (12", 2008, Young Turks)
- "Real Life" (12", 2010, True Panther Sounds)
- "Not the Same" (12", 2012, Young Turks)

==== Remixes ====
- "Chrome's On It (Tanlines remix)" originally by Telepathe (2008)
- "Apply (Tanlines remix)" originally by Glasser on Apply EP (2009, True Panther Sounds)
- "Kalise (Tanlines remix)" originally by El Guincho on Kalise EP (2009, Young Turks)
- "A New Chance (Tanlines remix)" originally by The Tough Alliance (Sincerely Yours, 2009)
- "Shadows (Tanlines remix)" originally by Au Revoir Simone (Rallye Label, 2009)
- "Bicycle (Tanlines remix)" originally by Memory Tapes (2010)
- "High Road (Tanlines remix)" originally by Deradoorian (Lovepump United, forthcoming)
- "Eyes Wide Open (Tanlines remix)" originally by Gotye (Universal Island Records, 2012)

==== In other compilations ====
- "Bejan", included on Kitsuné Maison Compilation 7 (2009, Kitsuné)
