= A New Testament (Christopher Owens album) =

Studio album by Christopher Owens
- Released: September 30, 2014
- Recorded: 2013
- Genre: Indie pop, indie rock, indie folk, alternative country
- Length: 33:35
- Label: Turnstile Records
- Producer: Doug Boehm

Christopher Owens chronology
Lysandre (2013)	A New Testament (2014)

Singles from A New Testament
- 1. "It Comes Back To You" Released: March 1, 2014; 2. "Nothing More Than Everything To Me" Released: July 9, 2014; 3. "Never Wanna See That Look Again" Released: September 15, 2014

Professional ratings
Aggregate scores
Source	Rating
Metacritic	61/100
Review scores
Source	Rating
Pitchfork	6.7/10
The Guardian	3/5 stars
AllMusic	2.5/5 stars
Consequence of Sound	B−
musicOMH	3.5/5 stars
NME	6/10
Pretty Much Amazing	B−
Culture Collide	83/100
The Line of Best Fit	6/10
Earbuddy	7.9/10

A New Testament is the second album recorded by former Girls lead vocalist and guitarist Christopher Owens. It was originally released on September 30, 2014, on the Turnstile Music record label.

== Background ==
In March 2014, Owens shared the track, "It Comes Back to You", writing that the song was "from a new album I've made with dear friends". Then in May, Owens followed this up with "Stephen", saying, "I think it's a song unlike anything I've ever worked on." In July, Owens shared the album cover and track listing plus a video for the single, "Nothing More Than Everything To Me", directed by Max Minghella, announcing that A New Testament would be released at the end of September accompanied by a North America and UK tour.

In a statement accompanying this announcement, Owens wrote that A New Testament was "inspired by the fundamentals of American music—Gospel, Country, R&B," and was a demonstration of "honest, earnest, simple songwriting—'three chords and the truth'". He also shared that he worked on the album with many of the musicians from Girls' Father, Son, Holy Ghost (2011), including guitarist John Anderson, drummer Darren Weiss and keyboardist Danny Eisenberg, and Lysandre producer Doug Boehm.

In an interview with Pitchfork in July, Owens shared that A New Testament was strongly influenced by the music he grew up with: the simple, country-influenced guitar music he played in the Children of God, and the AM radio he heard while working for the late Stanley Marsh 3 in Amarillo, Texas. Owens also commented on the more "lighthearted" nature of A New Testament, saying that he is "happy. And if some of that came out on the record, that's good. I don't want to be afraid to show that. People like me for being this down-and-out character, but I’m sorry, I'm not your Jesus. Don't hand me that cross. I refuse to play along." Owens attributed his relative contentment to the stable, long-term relationship he is in with Dominant Legs singer Hannah Hunt, and the improved relationship with his estranged father, who he refers to in the song "Stephen".

In August, Owens performed acoustic renditions of "I Just Can’t Live Without You (But I'm Still Alive)", "Nothing More Than Everything To Me" and the unreleased "Brian Deneke" (named for the 19-year-old punk musician of the same name, who was killed in a deliberate hit-and-run attack in 1997) in London. In the middle of September, Owens released the cowboy-themed music video for "Never Wanna See That Look Again", directed by Aaron Brown. A week ahead of its release, A New Testament started streaming in full via Pitchfork Advance.

Notably, a few songs on A New Testament originated from Owen's time in Girls: "Overcoming Me" was first written in January 2008, "Stephen" around 2010, while "Oh My Love" first premiered in July 2010. Owens commented on this, saying, "For me, the songs are good when they preserve a moment that I can always go back to. They serve as a little porthole to that very strong, real memory I had when I wrote it and I like that." In addition, despite the album's forays into gospel music, the opening number "My Trouble Heart" re-writes Peter, Paul and Mary's 1962 song "Early in the Morning" from a godless perspective. "I’m a very firm atheist. I never have believed in god," Owens states.

== Critical reception ==
A New Testament received generally favourable reviews from critics: At Metacritic, which assigns a normalized rating out of 100 to reviews from mainstream critics, the album received an average score of 61 out of 100, based on 20 reviews.

The Guardian's Tim Jonze called A New Testament "a gospel-tinged country record", writing that while "the melodies here don’t reflect [Owen's] best work", "there’s a passion and honesty here, an uncompromising desire to follow his own vision." Ben Ratliff of The New York Times wrote, "A New Testament is not tormented. Neither is it explicitly a new-morning, season-of-renewal record. It’s just a different kind of guilelessness, one that uses Hammond organ and steel guitar, and consequently leans toward country and gospel and a certain kind of settled, adult pop more than garage-punk and psychedelia."

== Track listing ==
All tracks are written by Christopher Owens.

No.	Title	Length
1.	"My Troubled Heart"	2:04
2.	"Nothing More Than Everything to Me"	2:10
3.	"It Comes Back to You"	4:27
4.	"Stephen"	2:39
5.	"Oh My Love"	3:38
6.	"Nobody's Business"	1:57
7.	"A Heart Akin the Wind"	2:25
8.	"Key to My Heart"	1:54
9.	"Over and Above Myself"	2:19
10.	"Never Wanna See That Look Again"	2:10
11.	"Overcoming Me"	4:04
12.	"I Just Can't Live Without You (But I'm Still Alive)"	3:48

== Personnel ==
Credits adapted from AllMusic.

- Christopher Owens – design, guitar, keyboards, mixing, percussion, producer, vibraphone, vocals
- John Anderson – guitar
- Doug Boehm – engineer, mixing, producer
- Dave Cooley – mastering
- Eddie Efira – pedal steel
- Danny Eisenberg – Hammond B3, piano, wurlitzer
- Makeda Francisco – background vocals
- Jared Hirshland – assistant
- Hannah Hunt – design
- Skyler Jordan – background vocals
- Traci Nelson – background vocals
- Morgan Stratton – assistant
- David Sutton – bass guitar
- Annie Thornton – cover photo, inside photo
- Darren Weiss – drums
- Terry Yerves – assistant
