= Subiza =

Subiza may refer to:

== General ==
- Subiza (album)
- Subiza (town)
