= Hippie (disambiguation) =

A hippie, or hippy, is someone associated with the counterculture of the 1960s and 1970s.

Hippie(s) or Hippy may also refer to:

- Hippies (TV series), a 1999 British comedy series
- Hippies (album), a 2010 album by Harlem
- Harry Hippy, pseudonym of Jackie Robinson, Jamaican singer
- Hippy Singmanee (born 1967), Thai Muay Thai fighter
