= Apar (album) =

Studio album by Delorean
- Released: September 2013
- Genre: Dance
- Label: Mushroom Pillow

Delorean chronology
Subiza (2010)	Apar (2013)	Muzik (2016)

Apar is the fifth studio album by Spanish alternative dance band Delorean, released in September 2013 by Mushroom Pillow.

The band call it their "big production album." The album was written and recorded with live instruments, as the band wanted to broaden their live performances and reduce the reliance on samplers. Of the creation process, band member Igor Escudeo says:

We wanted to play drums, play the guitar. That's what Ekhi said. On the Subiza record, he didn't play the bass and I didn't play the drums on the entire record. So this time, after touring for two years, the whole live show was based on a lot of samplers, pushing buttons the whole time. We wanted to rock a little bit. That's the main idea. It's a mixture between the computer and playing and trying to find the common ground there.

In a first for the band, several of the tracks on the album feature female vocalists including Chairlift's Caroline Polachek and Cameron Mesirow of Glasser.

== Track listing ==
All tracks are written by Delorean

No.	Title	Length
1.	"Spirit"	4:33
2.	"Destitute Time"	4:17
3.	"Dominion"	4:39
4.	"Unhold"	3:15
5.	"You Know It's Right"	3:58
6.	"Keep Up"	3:31
7.	"Walk High"	4:30
8.	"Your Face"	4:34
9.	"Inspire"	4:51
10.	"Still You"	5:06

== Personnel ==
- Vocals – Cameron Mesirow (tracks: 2), Caroline Polachek (tracks: 4), Erika Spring (tracks: 5, 6, 7, 8, 9, 10)
- Percussion – Chris Zane
- Co-producer – Chris Zane, Delorean, Van Rivers (tracks: 1)
- Engineer – Billy Pavone
- Mastered by Joe LaPorta
- Mixed by Chris Zane
- Mastered at Sterling Sound
- Engineered at Gigantic Studios
- Mixed at Gigantic Studios
- Photography by Adrià Cañameras
