= Lysandre (Christopher Owens album) =

Studio album by Christopher Owens
- Released: January 14, 2013
- Recorded: Fat Possum
- Genre: Indie pop, indie rock, indie folk
- Length: 28:20
- Label: Fat Possum
- Producer: Doug Boehm

Christopher Owens chronology
Lysandre (2013)	A New Testament (2014)

Lysandre is the debut album recorded by former-Girls lead vocalist and guitarist Christopher Owens. It was originally released on January 14, 2013 on the Fat Possum record label.

Following the posting of a statement on Twitter that he would be leaving Girls, on October 25, 2012, Owens announced that he would release his debut solo album, titled Lysandre, in January 2013. The album was recorded with a group of musicians in Los Angeles with producer Doug Boehm – who produced Girls' 2011 second album Father, Son, Holy Ghost. Owens released a statement with the announcement of Lysandre's release explaining that the album tells the story – in track sequence – of the first Girls tour in 2008 and takes its title from a girl he met in France during that trip. His statement calls the album "a coming of age story, a road trip story, a love story." The album and new solo career have allowed Owens to satisfy his own creative whims, and although he is sitting on a couple records worth of new material,"he admits that the gap between writing and recording gives him the distance to reappraise a song's quality."

The album is unusual in that all of the songs, save for the final track on the album Part of Me (Lysandre's Epilogue) are recorded in the key of A. Owens states that this song was written separately from the other tracks on the album. Also the album often incorporates the use of a refrain, played on a different instrument each time it is heard, a technique previously used by These New Puritans.

Owens, along with the seven musicians who appear on the album, performed Lysandre in full for the very first time at San Francisco's /The Lodge at the Regency Center on November 9, 2012. He was featured on the cover of Issue #83 of the Fader.

In April 2013, Owens released a fully acoustic version of Lysandre for free via his website. A vinyl version of Lysandre Acoustic was also released.

== Critical reception ==
Professional ratings
Aggregate scores
Source	Rating
Metacritic	68/100
Review scores
Source	Rating
Pitchfork	6.5/10
Sputnikmusic	4.0/5
NME	7/10

Lysandre received generally favorable reviews from critics: At Metacritic, which assigns a normalized rating out of 100 to reviews from mainstream critics, the album received an average score of 68 out of 100, based on 36 reviews. Irving Tan of Sputnikmusic remarked, "At only 28 minutes long, Lysandre is easily digestible in a single sitting, but that really just embellishes its true purpose – to temporarily whet our appetites till all those other Christopher Owens solo records appear."

David Renshaw from NME gave the album a favourable review, and stated that "Lysandre is an accomplished and confident first outing for a songwriter who already feels destined to nestle alongside Daniel Johnston and Elliott Smith as a master of the cult American songbook."

Owens later admitted that because of the "extreme reactions" to Lysandre, he found himself "listening to the album in order to see if it’s as bad as some people say it is. I still love it. I stand behind that album, very much so."

== Track listing ==
All tracks are written by Christopher Owens

No.	Title	Length
1.	"Lysandre's Theme"	0:38
2.	"Here We Go"	3:37
3.	"New York City"	3:15
4.	"A Broken Heart"	3:11
5.	"Here We Go Again"	3:26
6.	"Riviera Rock"	3:34
7.	"Love is in the Ear of the Listener"	2:15
8.	"Lysandre"	2:54
9.	"Everywhere You Knew"	2:17
10.	"Closing Theme"	0:48
11.	"Part of Me (Lysandre's Epilogue)"	2:30

== Personnel ==
Credits adapted from AllMusic.

- Christopher Owens – design, classical guitar, mixing, percussion, producer, vibraphone, vocals
- Doug Boehm – engineer, mixing, producer
- Cally Robertson – background vocals
- Dave Collins – mastering
- Jared Hirshland – engineer
- Hannah Hunt – design, background vocals
- Matthew Kallman – organ, piano, electric piano, synthesizer
- Seth Kasper – drums
- Ryan McGinley – cover photo
- Vince Meghrouni – flute, harmonica, saxophone
- David Sutton – bass
- Evan Weiss – electric guitar
