= Lust for Life (Girls song) =

Single by Girls

from the album Album
- Released: September 7, 2009
- Recorded: 2008
- Genre: Indie rock
- Length: 2:25
- Label: Fantasy Trashcan
- Songwriter(s): Christopher Owens
- Producer(s): Chet "JR" White

Girls singles chronology
"Hellhole Ratrace" (2009)	"Lust for Life" (2009)	"Laura" (2009)

"Lust for Life" is the second single by San Francisco indie rock group, Girls, released on September 9, 2009. The song is a single from their debut album, titled Album.

== Critical reception ==
Pitchfork gave the song the title of "Best New Music" with writer Ryan Dombal says the song has "baldly aspirational lyrics" and calls it "the background to chasing good times". Samuel Tolzmann of WRMC-FM wrote "Lust for Life", a "basically perfect 2009 beach-bum anthem". Spin named "Lust for Life" #4 on their list of "20 Best Summer Songs of 2009". DIY called the track, "possibly one of the most perfect indie anthems of the last decade".

Joe Colly of Pitchfork reviewed "Life in San Francisco", calling it a "simple, sunny ode to the group's beloved homebase", and says there's an "undercurrent of sadness to the track" but also noting it is not as "emotionally rich as most of Girls' material".

== Music video ==
The music video was released on August 10, 2009 and was directed by Aaron Brown; who also directed music videos for "Hellhole Ratrace" and "Morning Light".

== Track listing ==
No.	Title	Length
1.	"Lust for Life"	2:25
2.	"Life in San Francisco"	2:21
