= Crux (album) =

Studio album by Glasser
- Released: October 6, 2023
- Length: 43:49
- Label: One Little Independent
- Producer: Patrick Ford; Glasser

Glasser chronology
Sextape (2018)	Crux (2023)

Singles from Crux
- 1. "Vine" Released: June 7, 2023; 2. "Drift" Released: July 6, 2023; 3. "All Lovers" Released: August 2, 2023; 4. "Easy" Released: September 6, 2023

Crux is the third studio album by American musician Glasser (Cameron Mesirow). It was released on October 6, 2023, through One Little Independent. The album marks her first studio release in exactly ten years, following Interiors (2013).

== Background ==
Returning to the Art pop project Glasser after ten years, Mesirow admitted that it was hard for her after the previous album Interiors. She revealed that she had no center "to recompose" herself. Taking lessons in Balkan singing is what evoked positive connotations of music again. The ambition to learn "vocal gymnastic stuff" eventually inspired her to write songs and record an album. In a statement, Mesirow revealed that she wanted to create a project where every part sounds like "they're very separated". She was "thinking jazz" and found herself in a situation that was about getting back to "writing music" after feeling disconnected from the "machinery around making music".

Mesirow uses Crux as a means of "self reflection", exploring themes such as personal identity, vulnerability and human experience. Tracks on the record discuss the death of an old friend, the frailty of life and the importance of relationships in uncertain times. The potential loss of her voice, "a kind of death", posed a fear that prompted her to write. The musician accompanies these themes with a combination of Celtic folk music, Scottish motifs, and Eastern-European styles. Contributors include musician Robbie Lee, who played winds and reeds and whose music inspired her sound. The record pulls from several hardships and presents them as something more "digestible". To Mesirow, it signifies "half heaven and half earth" that she could only describe as a "crux". She sees herself as the "crux" of the album, as she lives on earth with heaven "inside of" her.

== Track listing ==
All tracks are written by Glasser.

Crux track listing
No.	Title	Length
1.	"A Guide"	3:17
2.	"Vine"	2:59
3.	"Easy"	4:02
4.	"Knaeve"	1:54
5.	"Mass Love"	5:13
6.	"Thick Waltz"	4:00
7.	"All Lovers"	4:24
8.	"Clipt"	4:52
9.	"Undrunk"	2:08
10.	"Drift"	3:46
11.	"Ophrys"	3:58
12.	"Choir Prayer"	3:16
Total length:		43:49

== Personnel ==
- Glasser – production, programming
- Patrick Ford – production (tracks 1–6, 8–11)
