= Hannah Hunt =

Hannah Hunt may refer to:

- Hannah Hunt, British woman killed in the 2024 Bushey killings
- Hannah Hunt, member of the US indie pop group Dominant Legs
- "Hannah Hunt", a song from the Vampire Weekend album Modern Vampires of the City
