= Oh Boy (Harlem album) =

Studio album by Harlem
- Released: February 14, 2019
- Length: 46:22
- Label: Female Fantasy Records

Harlem chronology
Hippies (2012)	Oh Boy (2019)

Singles from Oh Boy
- 1. "Cry Now Cry Later" Released: September 26, 2018; 2. "Swervin" Released: October 30, 2018; 3. "Queen of Mosquitos" Released: December 1, 2018; 4. "Blonde on Blonde" Released: January 15, 2019

Professional ratings
Review scores
Source	Rating
Pitchfork	5.1/10

Oh Boy is the third studio album by Austin, Texas based garage rock band Harlem. It was released on February 14, 2019.

== Reception ==
Pitchfork's Evan Rytlewski gave Oh Boy a 5.1 out of 10. Rytlewski wrote, "In 2010, no band seemed to be having more fun with scrappy garage rock than this one. On their first album in nine years, they forget to replace that spark with anything else." Rytlewski noted that for Oh Boy, Harlem "slowed the tempos, upped the production, and bled nearly every trace of boyish pep from their sound", a change that can be "hard to pull off". They concluded, "Any band returning from a long hiatus needs to be judged on a curve, but no amount of expectation mitigation can completely shield somebody with an affection for Harlem’s old records from the disappoint here. They waited nine years just to learn the party ended long ago."

Elijah Teed, writing for Exclaim!, also began their review by discussing Harlem's previous albums, saying, "Free Drugs ;-) and Hippies were like the first embers of a campfire, jumping and crackling without discernible destination or intent, but nevertheless carrying the spark of something warm and inviting." Teed continued, "With the release of Oh Boy, it's safe to say that spark has been snuffed out."

== Track listing ==
All tracks are written by Harlem.

Oh Boy track listing
No.	Title	Length
1.	"All Men Are Dogs"	2:44
2.	"Smoke in Mirrors"	3:37
3.	"Dreams Is Destiny"	3:39
4.	"Swervin"	3:59
5.	"Lana"	4:09
6.	"Click Your Heels"	3:49
7.	"Elegant and Sophisticated"	4:45
8.	"Blonde on Blonde"	3:56
9.	"Cry Now Cry Later"	3:30
10.	"Oh Boy"	3:12
11.	"Me and the Boys"	2:53
12.	"Queen of Mosquitos"	6:10
Total length:		46:22
