= Magic Kids =

Indie pop and rock band

- Origin: Memphis, Tennessee, USA
- Genres: Sunshine pop, power pop
- Years active: 2009–2013
- Labels: True Panther
- Members: Bennett Foster; Will McElroy; Ben Bauermeister; Michael Peery; Alex Gates; Alice Buchanan
- Website: Official website

Magic Kids was an American indie pop and rock music band from Memphis, Tennessee. They were signed to True Panther Sounds, of Matador Records.

== About ==
The band featured Bennett Foster (vocals, guitar), Will McElroy (keyboards), Ben Bauermeister (drums), Michael Peery (bass, vocals), Alex Gates (guitar, vocals), and Alice Buchanan (violin, keyboards, drums, vocals). Foster, Gates and McElroy were previously members of the Barbaras.

== Discography ==
- Memphis (2010)
