= Hippies (album) =

Studio album by Harlem
- Released: April 6, 2010
- Genre: Garage rock
- Label: Matador

Harlem chronology
Free Drugs ;-) (2008)	Hippies (2010)	Oh Boy (2019)

Professional ratings
Review scores
Source	Rating
Pitchfork Media	(8.1/10)
The A.V. Club	(B−)
PopMatters	(6/10)
BBC	(Very Positive)
The Boston Phoenix	2.5/4 stars
NME	(8/10)
Spin	3.5/5 stars
AllMusic	4/5 stars

Hippies is the second studio album by Austin, Texas-based garage rock band Harlem. The album was recorded in 2009 at The Distillery in Costa Mesa, California, and released on April 6, 2010.

The track "Gay Human Bones" appeared in the soundtrack for series 1 and 2 of the Netflix-distributed The End of the F***ing World. The track "Someday soon" appeared in season 1 of the Netflix original series Outer Banks.

== Track listing ==
1. "Someday Soon" (Michael Coomers)
2. "Friendly Ghost" (Michael Coomers, Curtis O'Mara, Jose Boyer)
3. "Spray Paint" (Michael Coomers)
4. "Number One" (Michael Coomers, Curtis O'Mara)
5. "Be Your Baby" (Michael Coomers)
6. "Gay Human Bones" (Michael Coomers)
7. "Torture Me" (Michael Coomers, Curtis O'Mara)
8. "Cloud Pleaser" (Michael Coomers)
9. "Faces" (Curtis O'Mara)
10. "Tila and I" (Michael Coomers, Curtis O'Mara)
11. "Three Legged Dog" (Michael Coomers, Curtis O'Mara)
12. "Prairie My Heart" (Michael Coomers, Curtis O'Mara, Jose Boyer)
13. "Scare You" (Curtis O'Mara)
14. "Stripper Sunset" (Curtis O'Mara)
15. "Pissed" (Michael Coomers)
16. "Poolside" (Michael Coomers)
17. "Sugar Foot" (Bonus Track)
