= Father, Son, Holy Ghost (album) =

Studio album by Girls
- Released: September 7, 2011
- Recorded: 2011
- Studios: San Francisco, United States
- Genre: Indie rock
- Length: 52:35
- Label: True Panther Sounds
- Producers: Chet "JR" White, Doug Boehm

Girls chronology
Broken Dreams Club (2010)	Father, Son, Holy Ghost (2011)

Singles from Father, Son, Holy Ghost
- 1. "Vomit" Released: July 20, 2011; 2. "Honey Bunny" Released: August 23, 2011; 3. "My Ma" Released: March 22, 2012

Father, Son, Holy Ghost is the second and final studio album by San Francisco rock band Girls, released September 13, 2011 on True Panther Sounds in the United States, September 12, 2011, on Fantasytrashcan/Turnstile in Europe, September 7, 2011, in Japan on Fantasytrashcan/Turnstile and September 14 in Mexico on Arts & Crafts México. Three singles were released from the album; "Vomit", "Honey Bunny" and "My Ma", the latter of which was released exclusively on vinyl with a limited 1000 copies in print. The album peaked at #37 on the Billboard 200 and received critical acclaim upon its release.

A significant departure from the band's previous work, Father, Son, Holy Ghost elaborated with lavish production, gospel choirs and a more varied instrumentation that resulted in a sound that spanned various genres such as surf rock, folk, soul, hard rock, and even progressive rock. Unlike the group's debut Album, it was not exclusively produced by the band themselves but was a collaboration with veteran engineer Doug Boehm. The album's sound and composition style was noted to be part of a trend of modern indie revivalism artists who reach back decades into the past for inspiration, with songs such as "Honey Bunny", "Love Like a River" and lead single "Vomit" in particular being heavily influenced by music from the 1960s and 1970s. Of the album's "old" style of production and the evolution of the band's sound, one critic noted that Father, Son, Holy Ghost eschews "Album's ramshackle scrappiness for the classic-rock-radio sophistication of Billy Preston-era Beatles and early-70s Pink Floyd."

The album was recognized as one of The 100 Best Albums of the Decade So Far by Pitchfork in August 2014, and one of The 200 Best Albums of the 2010s in October 2019.

== Background and recording ==
Girls came to prominence in independent music circles with the release of their first single "Hellhole Ratrace" in 2008, and then came to the attention of critics with the release of their debut album Album in 2009. Album was praised as one of the best records of the year, with critics lauding the emotional nuance and honesty of frontman Christopher Owens' songwriting, and the old-fashioned grittiness of the album's sound. The band released the Broken Dreams Club EP in 2010, as a way of "giving thanks to their listeners" who had supported them from the beginning. The EP featured progressive tracks such as "Carolina", and several critics noted how the group's sound was evolving dramatically to a style that would come to define many of the tracks on Father, Son, Holy Ghost. In an interview with Spin, Owens said the album's title was chosen to reflect the music's spiritual quality and explained that it was referred to as "Record 3" on the album cover to reflect the importance of Broken Dreams Club as the band's second record, despite not being a full-length album. According to Owens, it was "simply a nod (to the EP), which was a big statement".

"As far as I'm concerned, I produced every record. But when (Father, Son, Holy Ghost) came out and I saw the credit, I was surprised, it was listed as this dude (Boehm) that I hired to be our engineer. I get the feeling he (Owens) resented my contribution, or that he wanted to assure he was seen as the mastermind behind it all."

— Chet 'JR' White reflecting on the production credits

For the recording of Father, Son, Holy Ghost, Girls sought out drummer Darren Weiss, keyboardist Dan Eisenberg and guitarist John Anderson, all of whom became touring members for the group except Anderson, who quit just before the tour commenced. The band also utilized a trio of gospel singers for the first time, a group of pros who had worked with Whitney Houston and Mariah Carey. They would go on to tour with the group as well. This was a significant contrast to the recording of Album, which was solely a collaboration between Owens and his friend Chet "JR" White, with Owens playing most of the instruments and White handling most of the production duties. It was predominantly recorded in San Francisco's Golden Gate Studios and Los Angeles' The Sound Factory, with Doug Boehm, who had worked with K.D. Lang and Elliott Smith, producing the album in collaboration with the band themselves. Although an immaculately recorded finished product, with one critic noting that "the album sounds 'old' simply because it sounds so incredibly good," it was a troublesome and labored effort to record, with Boehm noting, "It wasn't an easy record to make. Nobody knew their parts." The Golden Gate studio was noted to be a "cavernnous basement" setting that was devoid of most of the traditional facilities of modern recording studios. White recalled the set-up as being unothodox and challenging: "I remember I walked in the space and the live room was nothing more than just a concrete basement of this office building. There was something about this room that wasn't a tuned recording studio live room." At one stage, when the band found the outside noise and flushing toilets from the above levels of the building too intrusive, they rigged a vocal booth out of Marshall Amp stacks that were lying around the studio, belonging to Boehm – an excessive gear collector. According to White, "He had an amp collection that was bordering on a real gear addiction. You could fill a 20×20 room to the top. It was an insane amount of stuff."

In a rare interview in the aftermath of Girls' breakup, White revealed that his relationship with Owens during the recording process was difficult, with the two barely on speaking terms. "While we were making the album – he's my best friend – but we weren't talking, and I still don't really know why. To me, I think maybe something happened that he feels uncomfortable talking about, but really, I'll never know." White felt that from the very start of the recording sessions he could foresee the end of Girls as a band; his relationship with Owens only a fraction of what it was at the time of the first album. "The basic idea was that the band was built around camaraderie and friendship, for me at least. At some point the band felt like, as stupid as it sounds, "a band of brothers." It felt like more than a band. So, when it became a band, it became less interesting and just a failure of our relationship. That was the whole band, him and I, so the failure of one meant the failure of both."

== Composition ==
=== Music ===
Father, Son, Holy Ghost was noted by several critics as being heavily influenced by a "bygone era" of music from the 1960s and 1970s, a larger occurring trend of artists reaching back to past decades for musical inspiration in structure, composition and tonality of sound. This was noted by critic Simon Reynolds in his book Retromania: Pop Culture's Addiction to Its Own Past as a phenomenon that several modern indie bands have become a part of. Reynolds argued that "pop culture has become obsessed with recycling from history," with Pitchfork clarifying upon his view that "In the age of the limitless archive, the relationship between new artists and their influences are changing," referencing Girls and LCD Soundsystem as two such examples. The album consisted of a vast array of influences and sounds from these eras, spanning from genres such as surf rock to folk, heavy metal and progressive rock. Examples of bands from these eras that influenced the album's overall sound include Deep Purple, Elvis Costello, Paul Simon, The Beach Boys and Pink Floyd. The album's opening track "Honey Bunny" is an example of a song influenced heavily by surf rock in particular, with critics noting its similarities to certain sixties staples such as "Fun, Fun, Fun" by The Beach Boys and "Kodachrome" by Paul Simon. Elsewhere, the heavy metal "muscle workout" of "Die" was noted by Owens himself as being inspired by an early Fleetwood Mac track, "Oh Well". "Die" was the result of a riff that Owens and White had been jamming with for a long time, something that finally resulted in a song that Owens has said is essentially "just us pretending to be rock n' rollers for a little bit." "Vomit" verges on epic, progressive rock, utilising a gospel choir that creates a wall of sound not dissimilar to early seventies records from bands such as Pink Floyd, with one critic describing it as "the kind of wailing gospel-like vocals that signified "authenticity" when the Stones and Floyd ruled the world."

Of the slower, more folk and classical inspired numbers on the album, Owens said of "Just a Song" that it was an example of "staying true to your songs, not letting the time that's passed since they've been written alter the way they sound at the end of the day." "Just a Song" features classical guitar picking and flutes played on a mellotron, a distinctive style of sound that Owens would come to heavily explore on his first solo outing, Lysandre, a concept album that he released in January 2013. Owens called the album's sombre closing track "Jamie Marie", a "Randy Newman" song. He went on to note the similarities between himself and Newman when it comes to conveying his own songs; "(Newman) writes these amazing songs that people cover – when Nina Simone sings "I Think It's Going to Rain Today" you want to cry. But even when Randy Newman sings it and his voice is obviously bad, you still say to yourself that it's a fucking knockout song. It was a challenge for me to sing (some of my) songs but, at the end of the day, it's like, 'Oh fucking well.' You just do it." On the album's intricate and significantly enhanced production, White commented; "During (Father, Son, Holy Ghost) we kind of realized what the band is. There's certain things I have reservations about... like maybe it's overkill or too obvious. Even the backup vocalists. Like on "Honey Bunny" they're kind of over the top. But to me, it has this almost musical theater vibe on the end when they all come in." White went on to credit the unexpected sectioned arrangements of songs like "Honey Bunny" and "Die" to Owens; "Chris will tend to throw in parts like that. To me it always feels like there's almost a tape edit – this drastic change. Like the song was built in a non-linear fashion. There's not really a fear in making it sound kind of awkward or patched together. To me, that's kind of exciting.

=== Lyrics ===
Whilst a majority of the lyrical themes on the record followed in the footsteps of Album in focusing on both successful and failed relationships, two songs in particular "Honey Bunny" and "My Ma" were written about Owen's relationship with his mother. Owens has been known to usually avoid writing about his upbringing or his past in general. Owens said of "Honey Bunny: "I recorded it knowing that she would hear it, and acknowledging that she was good to me [...] She's always thinking that I think she's a bad mom. When I played that for her, it was a very emotional moment. Because I don't begrudge her at all. It's just one of those situations, you know. It wasn't her fault." For "My Ma", the song was "like confessing to my mom" for Owens, an extension of "Honey Bunny" and "talking about needing her in my life still."

Of the relationship inspired songs on the album, both "Vomit" and "Saying I Love You" were written about separating from the same girlfriend. The title for "Vomit" was inspired by the Book of Proverbs aphorism "As a dog returns to his vomit, so a fool repeats his folly". On the song's subject matter, Owens said: "When I'm writing, 'I'm running around looking for you baby,' I literally would be running around, sometimes at night, going to certain bars I know my girlfriend was going to, seeing if she was there." He clarified how it represented the excessive things that love can make people do: "You can be very aware of how crazy you're being sometimes, and be very aware of how you're not able to help yourself." "Saying I Love You" was about rebutting the same girlfriend, who wanted him back a year after they had broken up; "It's about having the will power to say 'no.' Because we spent two years of bringing each other down." "Jamie Marie", the album's closing track, was written about a girlfriend that Owens had left behind in Amarillo, Texas, when he first moved to San Francisco.

"Just a Song", Owens's personal favorite song on the record, was written about the group of friends and the lifestyle that he was a part of when he first moved to San Francisco. "There was something beautiful about our little [San Francisco] scene that we had when we were all in the gutter together. And now Sandy Kim, who used to take all of our photos, is in New York. And ["Hellhole Ratrace" director] Aaron Brown is making music videos for tons of bands. Everybody's doing what they want to do, but that whole family, that little thing that's very important to me, is gone."

== Release ==
The album's cover was first revealed in a web widget on True Panther Sounds' website in early July 2011, and the album itself was later announced on July 7, 2011. To promote the record The Guardian streamed it in its entirety on their website on September 6, 2011. In an event dubbed "Girls Across America" in September, the band streamed their performance inside a Nashville record store on the websites, blogs and Facebook pages of numerous independent record stores across the United States. The record stores that participated in the event received limited edition vinyls. The album's first single, "Vomit," was released on July 20, 2011, as an MP3 download, and was accompanied by a music video three weeks later on August 8. The distinctive video featured lead singer Owens driving through an array of city streets in a 1966 Ford Mustang. "Vomit" received a "Best New Track" designation from Pitchfork, who noted that "Girls have quickly become experts at these types of cresting epics, and "Vomit" falls in line with previous clock-busters "Hellhole Ratrace" and "Carolina".

The second single chosen for release was "Honey Bunny", it directly preceded the album's release, first appearing on All Songs Considered on August 23, 2011 . A music video for "Honey Bunny", which featured Owens' girlfriend and was inspired by the video for Ariel Pink's "Life in L.A.", premiered on The New York Times' website on September 20, 2011. To promote the single and the album, the band made their first network television appearance on Late Night with Jimmy Fallon on September 13, and played "Honey Bunny" as well as "My Ma", the latter of which was released as an exclusive online video on the Jimmy Fallon website. The performance was notable for being the first time that Girls were accompanied by a trio of female backing singers on stage, as well as an organ player; both of which would join the group for their subsequent tour around the world to support the album.

The album's third single was "My Ma", a song about Owens' relationship with his mother that was considered 'one of the standout tracks from the album'. A music video for the song premiered on the Conan website on February 27, 2012. The video featured an elderly woman who represented Owens' mother, and followed her as she "reflected on her craft as an actress, showing that she can still conjure emotion on command." It was unsure as to whether the woman was Owens' real-life mother or just an actress portraying her. "My Ma" was released on a 7" vinyl single, limited to 1000 copies, on March 22, 2012. On the day of the single's release the band performed on Conan, playing album cut "Love Like a River".

== Critical reception ==
Professional ratings
Aggregate scores
Source	Rating
AnyDecentMusic?	7.6/10
Metacritic	79/100
Review scores
Source	Rating
AllMusic	3.5/5 stars
The A.V. Club	A−
Entertainment Weekly	B
The Guardian	3/5 stars
The Irish Times	4/5 stars
Mojo	4/5 stars
NME	8/10
Pitchfork	9.3/10
Rolling Stone	3.5/5 stars
Spin	9/10

Father, Son, Holy Ghost was released to generally positive reviews from critics. On the review aggregate site Metacritic, the album has a score of 79 out of 100. Zachary Houle of Popmatters thought the album was superior to Album, writing, "Unlike past Girls' outings, Father, Son, Holy Ghost is bracingly immediate, a collection of songs that don't have to grow on you—songs that are fully realized and lovable at first blush." Consequence of Sound's Möhammad Choudhery also thought the Father, Son, Holy Ghost was better than the band's debut album, writing "And so for a whole lot more reasons – some old, some new – Father, Son, Holy Ghost outdoes its forebears in, for the second straight time, about every way imaginable. In place of Album's sometimes hard-to-swallow, wallowing self-pity, Holy Ghost is streaked with a buoyant, some might call it spiritual, sense of self-consciousness, while maintaining the endearing timidity."

Some reviewers praised Girls for sounding original despite being heavily influenced by music from previous decades. Paste's Stephen Deusner declared "In that regard, this album not only surpasses its predecessor but raises the bar for any band, indie or otherwise, mining the past for inspiration." Pitchfork's Mark Richardson gave the album a Best New Music designation, writing "Since the retirement of LCD Soundsystem, San Francisco's Girls [...] just might be the band best making use of the current situation. Their music pilfers from the past without shame but also manages to sound like no one else." Richardson continued: "This lyrical simplicity shouldn't obscure the fact that these are sharply constructed songs that take unusual turns."

Allmusic's Jason Lymangrover, on the other hand, criticized Father, Son, Holy Ghost for being more indulgent than Album, writing, "All too often, artists follow up a breakout debut with a difficult sophomore outing, and Girls fall prey to the syndrome, overcompensating for average songs with dazzling instrumentation." Lymangrover concluded: "The good news is that this album proves they are top-level purveyors of pop. The bad is that the eccentricity that once flowed freely feels forced." In another mixed review, Dusted Review's Jennifer Kelly called the album "inconsistent," writing "The good songs — 'Honey Bunny,' 'Alex,' 'Die,' 'My Ma' and, especially, 'Vomit' — are clustered near the front. The bad ones, chief among them 'Saying I Love You,' wrap trivial sentiments in precocious pop arrangements and conjure Lite FM mainstays like Bread, Poco, America and Rupert Holmes [...]."

=== Accolades ===
Father, Son, Holy Ghost has appeared on several publications' year-end lists. Stereogum named it the best album of 2011, while Q ranked the album #41 on its list of the top 50 albums of 2011 Paste ranked the album #13 on its list of the best 50 albums of 2011, after being accidentally left off the magazine's original list. The same website also ranked the track "Honey Bunny" #11 on its list of the 50 Best Songs of 2011, calling it "the most memorable track [...] featuring a hazily upbeat chorus." Pitchfork ranked the album #5 on its list, with Stuart Berman writing: "[...] even more so than its predecessor, Father, Son, Holy Ghost is a capital-A Album." Mojo placed the album at number 30 on its list of "Top 50 albums of 2011."

The album was recognized as one of The 100 Best Albums of the Decade So Far by Pitchfork in August 2014. In 2019, Pitchfork ranked Father, Son, Holy Ghost at number 82 on their list of "The 200 Best Albums of the 2010s".

== Tour and performances ==
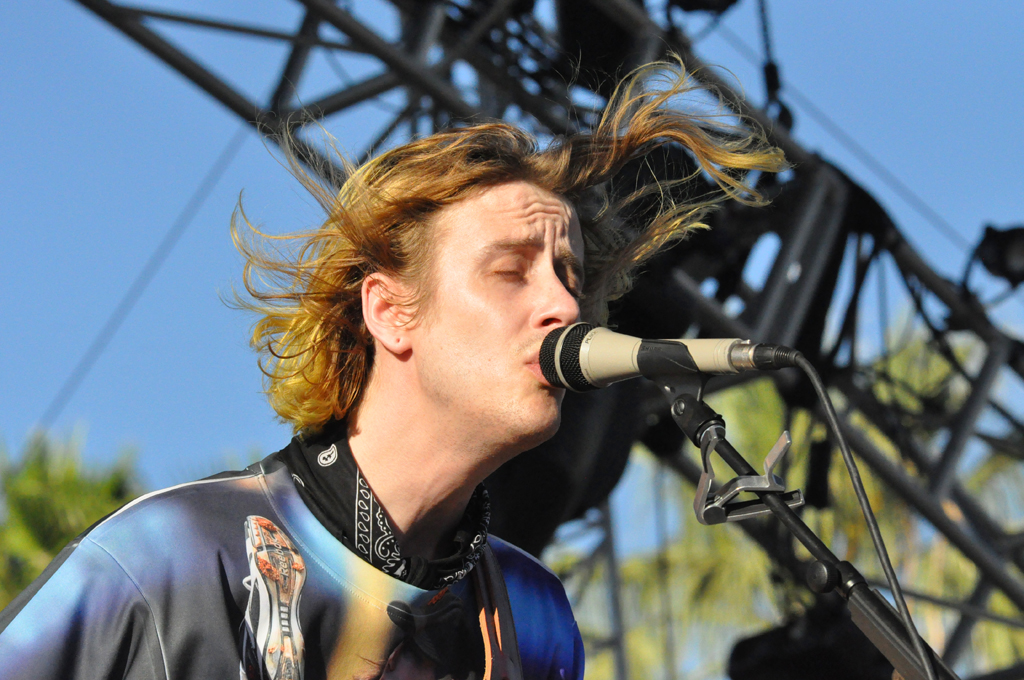
Girls' frontman Christopher Owens at Coachella Music and Arts Festival

Owens has said that he had to be convinced to go on tour to support the album, as he was considering breaking the band up after guitarist John Anderson – one of Owen's best friends – quit just as the recording for Father, Son, Holy Ghost had finished. He referred to this as the "final straw", and as one of the primary reasons for why he would go on to break up the band in 2012. He also expressed how he would have liked to have toured all together with everyone that featured on the recording, but that "the keyboard player wanted something like $2000 a week, which we cannot afford, and the drummer we were hoping for, but he has his own band." Darren Weiss would end up touring with the group, but they had to seek out a new keyboard player and guitarist.

The tour in support of Father, Son, Holy Ghost began on September 3, 2011, in Los Angeles and ended on October 9, 2011, in San Francisco. The second leg of the tour began on January 28, 2012, at the St Jerome's Laneway Festival in Brisbane, Australia and ended on April 20, 2012, at the Coachella Valley Music and Arts Festival. The band was accompanied by Unknown Mortal Orchestra during the March portion of this leg.

== Track listing ==
All songs written by Christopher Owens.

No.	Title	Length
1.	"Honey Bunny"	2:33
2.	"Alex"	4:50
3.	"Die"	4:50
4.	"Saying I Love You"	3:58
5.	"My Ma"	3:57
6.	"Vomit"	6:23
7.	"Just a Song"	6:39
8.	"Magic"	3:27
9.	"Forgiveness"	7:49
10.	"Love Like a River"	3:41
11.	"Jamie Marie"	4:28
Total length:		52:35

iTunes Bonus track
No.	Title	Length
12.	"Love Life"	2:29

Amazon Bonus track
No.	Title	Length
12.	"Martina Martinez (instrumental)"	2:45

== Personnel ==
Adapted from the AllMusic album credits.

Girls

- Christopher Owens – lead vocals, rhythm guitar, classical guitar, harmonica, Mellotron, celesta, artwork
- John Anderson – lead guitar; backing vocals on "Saying I Love You"
- Dan Eisenberg – organ, piano, electric piano
- Chet "JR" White – bass, lead guitar, percussion
- Darren Weiss – drums, percussion

Additional

- Vearline Board – background vocals
- Doug Boehm – mixing, producer
- Chris Claypoole – assistant engineer
- Tisha Fredrick – background vocals
- Girls – mixing, producer
- Camren Lister – assistant engineer
- Drew Zajicek – assistant engineer

== Charts ==
Chart (2011)	Peak position
French SNEP	123
Norwegian VG-lista	21
UK Indie Chart	20
US Billboard 200	37
US Independent Albums	10

As of 2012 the album has sold 48,000 copies in United States according to Nielsen SoundScan.
