= Highlights (Tanlines album) =

Studio album by Tanlines
- Released: May 19, 2015
- Genre: Electronic
- Length: 39:48
- Label: Tru Thoughts

Tanlines chronology
| Mixed Emotions (2012) | Highlights (2015) |

Highlights is the second studio album by American duo Tanlines. It was released in May 2015 under Tru Thoughts.

== Reception ==
Professional ratings
Aggregate scores
| Source | Rating |
|---|---|
| Metacritic | 63/100 |
Review scores
| Source | Rating |
| AllMusic | 3.5/5 stars |
| Consequence of Sound | C- |
| Rolling Stone | 3.5/5 stars |

Jon Dolan of Rolling Stone wrote, "On their second album, singer-guitarist Eric Emm and multi-instrumentalist Jesse Cohen sound like they burn prayer candles to the moany ghosts of OMD and ABC, but the pair's songs take you places you don't expect — from the Roy Orbison-ish country goth of 'Invisible Ways' to the Afropop buoyancy of 'Slipping Away'... Even at its most mournful, this is an album charged by bright ideas."

== Track listing ==
All tracks are written by Jesse Cohen and Eric Emm.

| No. | Title | Length |
|---|---|---|
| 1. | "Pieces" | 3:53 |
| 2. | "Slipping Away" | 3:29 |
| 3. | "Palace" | 4:25 |
| 4. | "Two Thousand Miles" | 4:14 |
| 5. | "Invisible Ways" | 3:33 |
| 6. | "Bad Situations" | 4:12 |
| 7. | "Running Still" | 4:06 |
| 8. | "Thinking" | 3:30 |
| 9. | "If You Stay" | 4:42 |
| 10. | "Darling Dreamer" | 3:44 |
