= Ayrton Senna (EP) =

Ayrton Senna EP

EP by Delorean
- Released: 2009
- Genres: Alternative dance; Balearic beat
- Length: 17:54
- Label: Mushroom Pillow
- Producer: Delorean

Delorean chronology
Transatlantic KK (2007)	Ayrton Senna EP (2009)	Subiza (2010)

Professional ratings
Review scores
Source	Rating
Cokemachineglow	(78%)
Consequence of Sound	4/5 stars
Pitchfork Media	(8.4/10)

Ayrton Senna EP is the self-produced second extended play by Spanish alternative dance band Delorean, released in 2009 by Mushroom Pillow. Fool House distributed it worldwide. The title is named after the famous Brazilian Formula One driver. The EP received positive reviews from critics. The song "Deli" was featured in NBA 2K11.

== Track listing ==
There are two different versions of this EP, one contains:

No.	Title	Length
1.	"Seasun"	4:27
2.	"Deli"	4:39
3.	"Big Dipper"	5:04
4.	"Moonson"	3:44

Whilst the other contains:

No.	Title	Length
1.	"Deli"	4:41
2.	"Moonson"	3:47
3.	"Seasun"	4:29
4.	"Seasun" (John Talabot's Kids & Drums Remix)	7:26
5.	"Big Dipper"	5:04
