= Ring (Glasser album) =

Studio album by Glasser
- Released: September 24, 2010
- Recorded: November 2009 – April 2010
- Studio: Los Angeles, Stockholm
- Genre: Electropop
- Length: 38:25
- Label: True Panther Sounds
- Producer: Glasser, Ariel Rechtshaid, Van Rivers & The Subliminal Kid

Glasser chronology
Ring (2010)	Interiors (2013)

Professional ratings
Aggregate scores
Source	Rating
Metacritic	78/100
Review scores
Source	Rating
AllMusic	4/5 stars
The A.V. Club	A−
Drowned in Sound	6/10
NME	4.5/5 stars
Pitchfork	8.0/10
PopMatters	6/10 stars
Slant Magazine	3.5/5 stars
Uncut	3/5 stars

Ring is the debut studio album by American musician Glasser (Cameron Mesirow), released on September 24, 2010 by True Panther Sounds. The album was critically acclaimed upon its release.

== Track listing ==
1. "Apply" – 4:59
2. "Home" – 4:07
3. "Glad" – 2:23
4. "Plane Temp" – 4:21
5. "T" – 5:17
6. "Tremel" – 3:46
7. "Mirrorage" – 3:39
8. "Treasury of We" – 5:27
9. "Clamour" – 4:30
