= Chet "JR" White =

American record producer (died 2020)

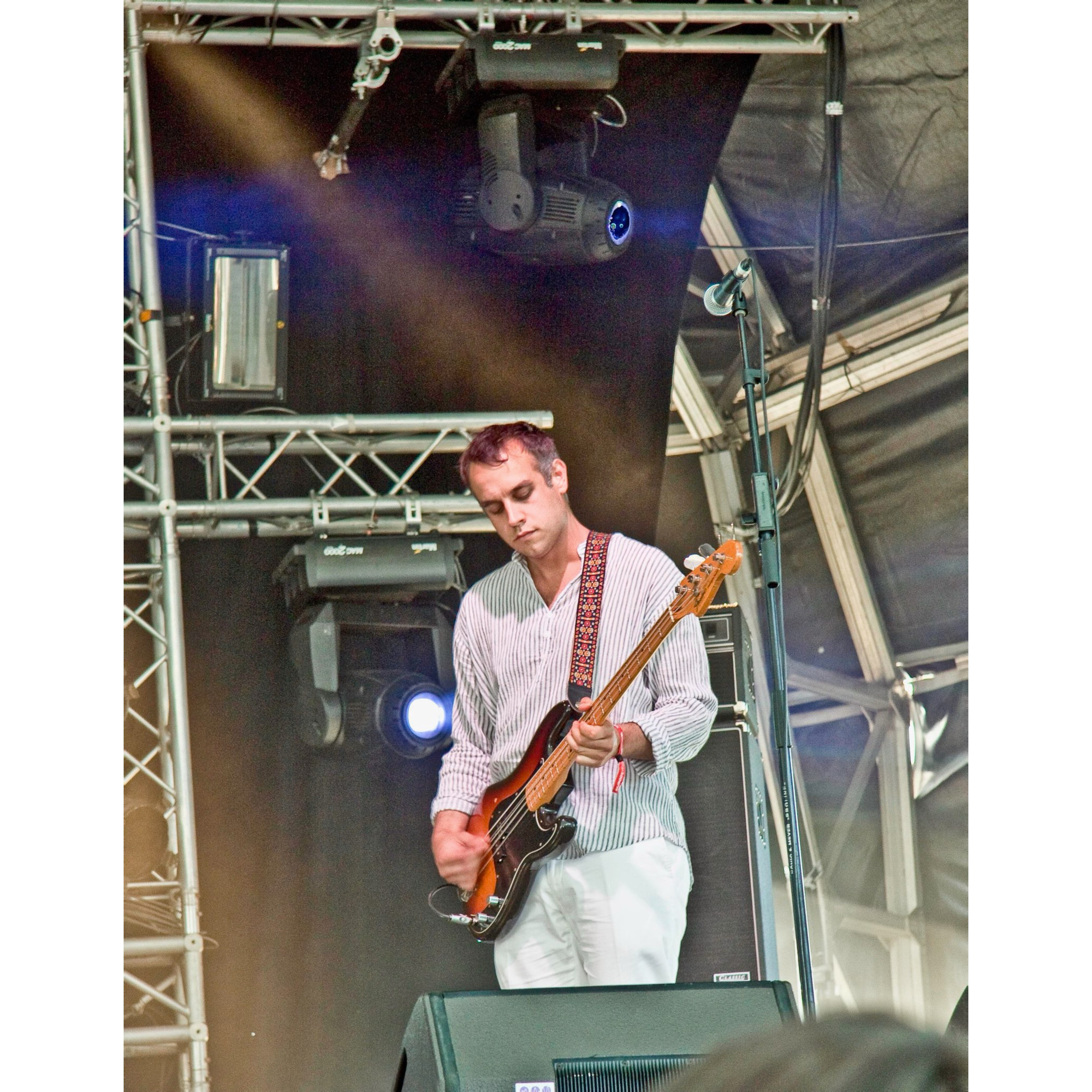
- White at Primavera Sound 2009

Background information
- Born: November 23, 1979
- Origin: Santa Cruz, California
- Died: October 18, 2020 (aged 40) Santa Cruz, California
- Genre: Indie rock
- Instrument: bass
- Years active: 1995–2020
- Label: True Panther Sounds
- Formerly of: Girls

Chet "JR" White (November 23, 1979 – October 18, 2020) was an American record producer, musician and mix engineer. He was a member of the indie rock band Girls until their disbandment in 2012. He produced the album Goon by Tobias Jesso Jr. and Sob Story by the Spectrals, among others.

== Biography ==
White was born and raised in Santa Cruz, California. His parents were "supportive and liberal". As a teen, he began playing in punk rock groups, learning about recording, and spending time in record stores. At 13, White was in a band, the Willies, a country punk band. When he was a sophomore in high school, White decided he wanted to be a recording engineer or producer. He attended Cabrillo College, but dropped out.

He later moved to San Francisco, spending his 20s and 30s there, and attended the now-defunct California Recording Institute, earning a degree in recording engineering. White also briefly set up a studio in a basement space on Market Street. He briefly worked as catering chef and at the Zuni Café in San Francisco. In San Francisco, Matt Fishbeck of the band Holy Shit, introduced him to Christopher Owens. The duo would go on to form the band Girls in 2007.

Girls was signed to True Panther Sounds and released their debut album, Album, which was produced by White, on September 22, 2009. The album received praise from critics and was named one of the ten best albums of 2009 by Spin, Rolling Stone, and Pitchfork. In November 2010, the band released an EP titled Broken Dreams Club which was also well received. In 2011, Girls released their second and final studio album, Father, Son, Holy Ghost. The album was co-produced by White. Girls disbanded in 2012 for personal reasons within the band.

In 2012 he received a demo track in the mail from Tobias Jesso Jr. and after listening to it, invited him to San Francisco to record music. White connected Jesso to True Panther, eventually producing several tracks on his 2013 album Goon

In 2013, White recorded and produced for an album by DIIV, but the session was ultimately scrapped.

White died on October 18, 2020, in Santa Cruz, California, aged 40.

== Discography ==
=== with Girls ===
- Album – Girls (2009, True Panther Sounds)
- Broken Dreams Club – Girls (2010, True Panther Sounds)
- Father, Son, Holy Ghost – Girls (2011, True Panther Sounds)

=== Production credits ===
- Album – Girls (2009, True Panther Sounds)
- Broken Dreams Club – Girls (2010, True Panther Sounds)
- Father, Son, Holy Ghost – Girls (2011, True Panther Sounds)
- It's Glitz – Glitz (2013, Grazer Records)
- Sob Story – Spectrals (2013, Wichita)
- Big Wheel and Others – Cass McCombs (2013, Domino, mix engineer and recording)
- Goon – Tobias Jesso Jr. (2015, True Panther Sounds)
- Family Album – Lia Ices (2021, Natural Music)
