= Harlem (band) =

American rock band

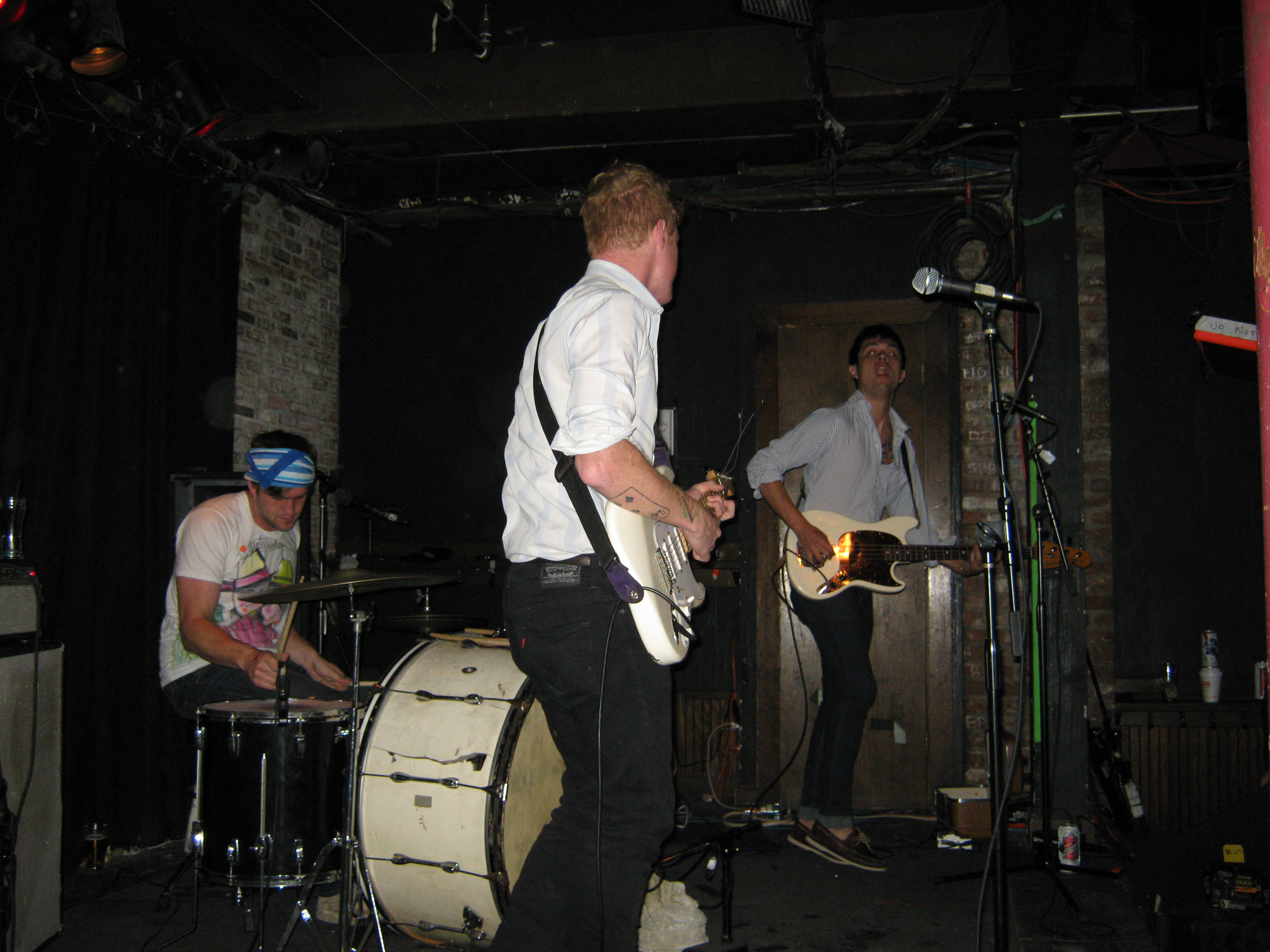

Background information
- Origin: Tucson, Arizona, United States
- Genres: Garage rock, indie rock, lo-fi
- Years active: 2007–present
- Label: Matador
- Members: Michael Coomers; Curtis O'Mara
- Past members: Jose Boyer; John Hostetter

Harlem is an American garage rock band comprising vocalist/guitarist/drummer Michael Coomers, vocalist/guitarist/drummer Curtis O'Mara and bassist Jose Boyer, formerly of Chapel Hill-based The Gondoliers and The Kashmir.

== History ==
Harlem started in Tucson, AZ before relocating to Austin where they generated a mountain of attention, both with their live shows and their self-issued 2008 album Free Drugs ;-), mastered by Nathan Sabatino at Loveland Recording Studios.

Matador signed the Austin, Texas trio to a multi-record, worldwide deal. Harlem recorded their 2nd album in the summer of 2009. Hippies, was released on April 6, 2010. It was recorded by Mike McHugh at "The Distillery" in Costa Mesa, California. The band supported The Dead Weather in July, 2010. As of April 2012, the band is on an indefinite hiatus as all members are busy with other projects.

Coomers currently performs with Lace Curtains (also featuring Bloc Party's Matt Tong), who have released the albums The Garden of Joy and the Well of Loneliness on 1 August 2009, and A Signed Piece of Paper on 28 October 2014.

O'Mara currently plays with Grape St., and Boyer is performing with Daytona and Las Rosas.

Harlem released a new album Oh Boy in 2019.

== Discography ==
=== Albums ===
- Free Drugs ;-) (self-released, 2008)
- Hippies (Matador, 2010)
- Oh Boy (Female Fantasy Records, 2019)
- Nieznany świt (Polskie Radio, 2022)

=== EPs ===
- LSD Saves 7" (Female Fantasy Records, 2010)
