= Magic Bullets =

American indie pop band

- Origin: San Francisco, California, U.S.
- Genre: Indie pop
- Years active: 2004–2011
- Labels: MonAmie Records, Words On Music
- Members: Philip Benson (vocals 2004–2011); Corey Cunningham (guitar, 2004–2011); Alex Kaiser (drums, 2010–2011); Sean "Shony Collins" McDonnell (Keys, 2010–2011); Nathan Sweatt (bass guitar, 2004–2011)
- Past members: Noah Brodsky (drums, 2005); Colin Dobrin (drums, 2004–2009); Ryan "Gran" Lynch (guitar, 2004–2009); Matthew Kallman (keyboards, 2004–2010); Dan "Danny Panic" Sullivan (drums, 2009-2010)

Magic Bullets was an American indie pop band from San Francisco, California.

== History ==
Magic Bullets formed in San Francisco, California in 2004 with musicians primarily hailing from the Bay area who had spent most of their musically formative years playing with or alongside one another in various punk rock outfits. Vocalist Philip Benson and guitarist and primary songwriter Cunningham first met in 2000 and later played together in The Cosmos.

After a few years Cunningham and Benson called upon friends Colin Dobrin (drums), Matthew Kallman (Future Girls) (keys) and Nathan Sweatt (bass guitar) to form a new band to play music inspired by their favorite artists, inspiration from Orange Juice, The Sound, and The Feelies.

After developing an agreeable repertoire, and with the welcomed addition of long-time friend and musical collaborator and guitarist Ryan Lynch (Former Cosmos/Future Dominant Legs/Girls), Magic Bullets set out to play scores of shows in the winter of 2004/2005. In October 2005 the sextet had their first recording session of material to be included on their debut at Atomic Garden in East Palo Alto, California. In June 2006 Magic Bullets recorded six additional songs at House of Faith in Oakland with Bart Thurber, and a few more songs recorded by Lev Perrey at The Emergency Room. Perrey mixed the album in the Summer of 2006.

In early 2007 the band released their debut, an album's worth of recordings collected over the span of the three years since the band's conception. Their first full-length album, A Child But In Life Yet A Doctor In Love, was released on Minneapolis’ Words on Music. The band then embarked on a tour through the United States, culminating in a performance at the 2008 South by Southwest festival.

In 2009, guitarist Ryan Lynch exited the group to pursue his own project, Dominant Legs. A few months later, drummer Colin Dobrin left the band. Magic Bullets then recruited well-known punk drummer Danny "Panic" Sullivan. Magic Bullets opted to self-release their second recording, a four-song 12-inch titled Lives For Romance.

Magic Bullets' second full-length album was recorded at Atomic Garden in East Palo Alto, California by long-time friend Jack Shirley. Prior to the album's release, Danny "Panic" Sullivan and longtime keyboardist Matt Kallman left the group. The band then recruited various friends to fill in for one single shows. Sean McDonnell (Shony Collins), longtime friend and fan of Magic Bullets was asked to join the band and played his first show live on public radio's west coast live. Soon after that Alex Kaiser (Tempo no Tempo) took on the role of Magic Bullets drummer. The album was released in June 2010 on Mon Amie Records.

Mon Amie Records released the group's final release, an EP called Much Ado About, in 2012. Phil Benson, Corey Cunningham, and Nathan Sweatt continued playing in Terry Malts, a group they started in 2009.

A lost album, recorded from 2007–2008 titled Young Man's Fancy was released by Cunningham on his Parked In Hell label in 2016.

== Discography ==
=== Albums ===
- a CHILD but in life yet a DOCTOR in love (2007; Words On Music) (recorded 2005–2006)
- Upstairs Flight (iTunes single) – February 2008
- Lives For Romance (self-released) – January 2009
- Lying Around 7-inch (Mon Amie) – April 2010
- S/T (also known as Second Glance) (Mon Amie) – June 2010
- Young Man's Fancy (lost album, recorded 2007–2008 - Parked In Hell) – March 2016
