= Interiors (Glasser album) =

Studio album by Glasser
- Released: October 7, 2013
- Genre: Electropop
- Length: 38:25
- Label: True Panther Sounds
- Producer: Glasser, Van Rivers

Glasser chronology
Ring (2010)	Interiors (2013)	Sextape (2018)

Singles from Interiors
- 1. "Shape" Released: August 21, 2013; 2. "Design" Released: September 13, 2013

Interiors is the second studio album by American musician Glasser (Cameron Mesirow), released on October 7, 2013 by True Panther Sounds. Much like its 2010 predecessor Ring, Interiors was well-received by critics.

== Track listing ==
1. "Shape" – 4:57
2. "Design" – 3:15
3. "Landscape" – 3:59
4. "Forge" – 4:32
5. "Window I" – 1:47
6. "Keam Theme" – 4:11
7. "Exposure" – 3:41
8. "Dissect" – 4:14
9. "Window III" – 1:58
10. "Window II" – 1:14
11. "New Year" – 3:21
12. "Divide" – 5:31
