= Subiza (album) =

Studio album by Delorean
- Released: March 2010
- Recorded: July–August 2009 in Subiza, Spain
- Genre: Alternative dance, Balearic beat
- Length: 42:30
- Label: Mushroom Pillow
- Producer: Delorean

Delorean chronology
Ayrton Senna EP (2009)	Subiza (2010)	Apar (2013)

Subiza is the fourth studio album by the Spanish alternative dance band Delorean, released in March 2010 by Mushroom Pillow. True Panther Sounds distributed a worldwide edition in June the same year. Named after the Navarre town in which it was recorded, the album follows the Ayrton Senna EP (2009).

Subiza was very well received by critics, and received a label of Best New Music from Pitchfork. Pitchfork placed it at number 41 on its list "The Top 50 Albums of 2010".

== Track listing ==
No.	Title	Length
1.	"Stay Close"	4:32
2.	"Real Love"	6:06
3.	"Endless Sunset"	4:27
4.	"Grow"	4:40
5.	"Simple Graces"	4:18
6.	"Infinite Desert"	4:52
7.	"Come Wander"	4:20
8.	"Warmer Places"	4:48
9.	"It's All Ours"	4:33

Professional ratings
Review scores
Source	Rating
AllMusic	4/5 stars
The A.V. Club	(B+)
Drowned in Sound	(8/10)
The Irish Times	4/5 stars
MusicOMH	4/5 stars
NME	(7/10)
Pitchfork	(8.4/10)
PopMatters	(8/10)
Sputnikmusic	3.5/5 stars
The Times	4/5 stars
