= Broken Dreams Club =

EP by Girls
- Released: November 22, 2010
- Recorded: 2009–2010
- Genre: Indie rock
- Length: 30:12
- Labels: True Panther Sounds; TRUE-040
- Producer: Chet "JR" White

Girls chronology
Album (2009)	Broken Dreams Club (2010)	Father, Son, Holy Ghost (2011)

Broken Dreams Club is an EP and the second release by American indie rock band Girls, released on November 22, 2010 on True Panther Sounds.

== Background ==
The EP was announced in a handwritten letter written by Girls frontman Christopher Owens. Owens described Broken Dreams Club as a "snapshot of the horizon" and "a taste of things to come."

Broken Dreams Club was the first Girls release to feature a full band (Girls was previously a collaboration between Owens and JR White). Some songs, such as "Substance", were written before Album's release. Caitlin Upton's infamous response at Miss Teen USA 2007 inspired the EP's closing track "Carolina". Owens felt much sympathy for Upton after seeing all the negative publicity she was receiving and wrote the song "about wanting to save someone from the ravenous wolves of just the way the modern world is."

== Critical reception ==
Professional ratings
Review scores
Source	Rating
AllMusic	3/5 stars
Pitchfork	(8.7/10)
Drowned in Sound	(7/10)
PopMatters	(8/10)
Rolling Stone	3.5/5 stars
Spin	8/10 stars

Critical response to Broken Dreams Club was very positive. On the review aggregate site Metacritic, the EP has a score of 79 out of 100, indicating "generally favorable reviews".

AllMusic's Jason Lymangrover wrote "If this is a sign of things to come, expect them to sound like Beirut or Grizzly Bear by their next full-length." Popmatters' Arnold Pan gave the EP a positive review, writing "What Girls prove more convincingly than ever on Broken Dreams Club is that sometimes a little stylistic schizophrenia can actually go a long way in shaping a singular artistic vision. So just how Owens and White mix-and-match forms and make clichés not sound like clichés might be a riddle wrapped in a mystery inside an enigma... but all you really need to know is that their formula works..." Pan also singled out the track "Carolina" for praise, calling it "a sprawling, multi-part piece that recalls and one-ups Girls' first breakout number, 'Hellhole Ratrace.'" David Bevan of Pitchfork also gave Broken Dreams Club a positive review, writing "If Broken Dreams Club is indeed an honest glimpse of what's ahead, it sounds as though Girls have much more to give." The EP was also given a "Best New Music" designation in the review. Drowned in Sound's Sam Lewis, commenting on the EP's diverse musical styles, wrote "It's a scatterbrainedness that makes Girls endearing and frustrating at the same time..." Lewis continued: "Still, it's hard to begrudge a band their niche when they do it so well."

Broken Dreams Club was ranked #22 on Pitchfork's "The Top 50 Albums of 2010" list. The same website also ranked the song "Carolina" #31 on its "Top 100 Tracks of 2010" list.

== Track listing ==
All tracks are written by Christopher Owens.

No.	Title	Length
1.	"The Oh So Protective One"	3:36
2.	"Heartbreaker"	4:02
3.	"Broken Dreams Club"	5:12
4.	"Alright"	4:46
5.	"Substance"	4:48
6.	"Carolina"	7:43

== Personnel ==
Adapted from AllMusic.

=== Girls ===
- Christopher Owens – lead vocals, rhythm guitar, percussion, horn arrangements, mixing, cover art, photography
- Ryan Lynch – lead guitar
- Matthew Kallman – Farfisa organ, organ, electric piano
- Chet "JR" White – bass, synthesizer, percussion, horn arrangements, production
- Garett Goddard – drums, backing vocals

=== Additional personnel ===
- Ara Anderson – horn
- Joel Behrman – horn
- Dee Dee – background vocals
- Richard Dodd – mastering
- Dan Eisenberg – Hammond B3, piano
- Rick Elmore – trombone
- Corey Lee Granet – guitar
- Tom Heyman – Pedal Steel
- Dave McNair – mastering
- Mike Olmos – trumpet
- J.J. Wiesler – engineer, horn arrangements, Mellotron, mixing

== Charts ==
Chart (2010)	Peak position
US Top Heatseekers	5
US Independent Albums	34

As of 2012 the album has sold 19,000 copies in United States according to Nielsen SoundScan.
