= Girls (band) =

American indie rock band

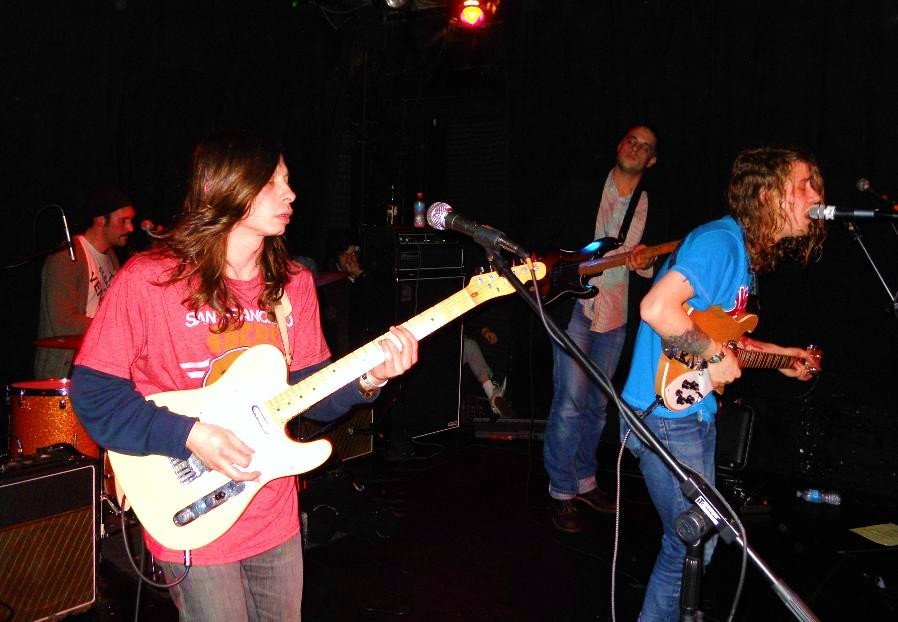
- Girls performing in 2010

Background information
- Origin: San Francisco, California, U.S.
- Genres: Indie rock, jangle pop
- Years active: 2007–2012
- Labels: True Panther Sounds, Matador, Fantasy Trashcan (Turnstile), Arts & Crafts México
- Past members: Christopher Owens; Chet "JR" White
- Website: facebook.com/GIRLSsf

Girls was an American indie rock band, formed in San Francisco in 2007. The band comprised two key members: Christopher Owens, songwriter and lead singer, and Chet "JR" White, who played bass and produced. Girls' sound was heavily inspired by the music of the 1950s, 1960s, and 1970s, with their sound being described as lo-fi, surf rock, rock and roll, psychedelic rock, pop rock, country rock, and garage rock.

Girls' debut full-length, Album, was released in 2009 to critical acclaim. Its 2011 follow-up, Father, Son, Holy Ghost, was also well received. On July 2, 2012, Owens announced that he was leaving the band and would continue to record as a solo artist.

== History ==
=== Formation and Album (2007–09) ===
Owens was born into the fundamentalist cult Children of God, but absconded at the age of sixteen from their community in Slovenia to Amarillo, Texas. It took him years of exploring common technology, hardcore punk and nihilism, among other things, to cope in mainstream society. He began busking, which gave him an outlet and contact with the outside world. In an interview with Exclaim! magazine, Owens related much of how being part of the Children of God cult informed his childhood and his music. While there, he was not allowed to listen to music from outside the group, but was allowed to watch films from which he absorbed music like Queen and Guns N' Roses. In Amarillo, Owens was taken in by Stanley Marsh 3, working as his personal assistant for four years.

When Owens turned 25, he moved to San Francisco, where he started making music and taking drugs such as cocaine and heroin. While in California, Owens became a member of Holy Shit with Ariel Pink and Matt Fishbeck. Owens then met Chet "JR" White, a Bay Area native who was raised in Santa Cruz, California, who began recording bands in his parents' garage in his teens. Upon meeting, the two developed a strong bond and interest in similar music, as well as a shared background in punk/hardcore music. Shortly thereafter, Owens and White started recording what was to later be their debut album, titled Album.

Album received critical acclaim when it was released. Pitchfork rated the single "Hellhole Ratrace" at 383 of the top 500 songs of the 2000s. The same website gave the album a grade of 9.1/10 and was rated the 10th best album of 2009.

=== Father, Son, Holy Ghost (2010–2011) ===
In 2010, Girls released the EP Broken Dreams Club, an EP Owens described as "a taste of things to come." On July 20, 2011, they released the song "Vomit" from their upcoming album as a free download. This was followed by a video of the same song in August. "Honey Bunny" was the second cut off the record. The band released their second full-length album Father, Son, Holy Ghost on September 9, 2011, in UK/Europe and on September 13 in the US. In November 2011, Girls announced a standalone single, "Lawrence", released on heart-shaped vinyl on November 28, 2011; The song was written as a tribute to Felt lead singer Lawrence.

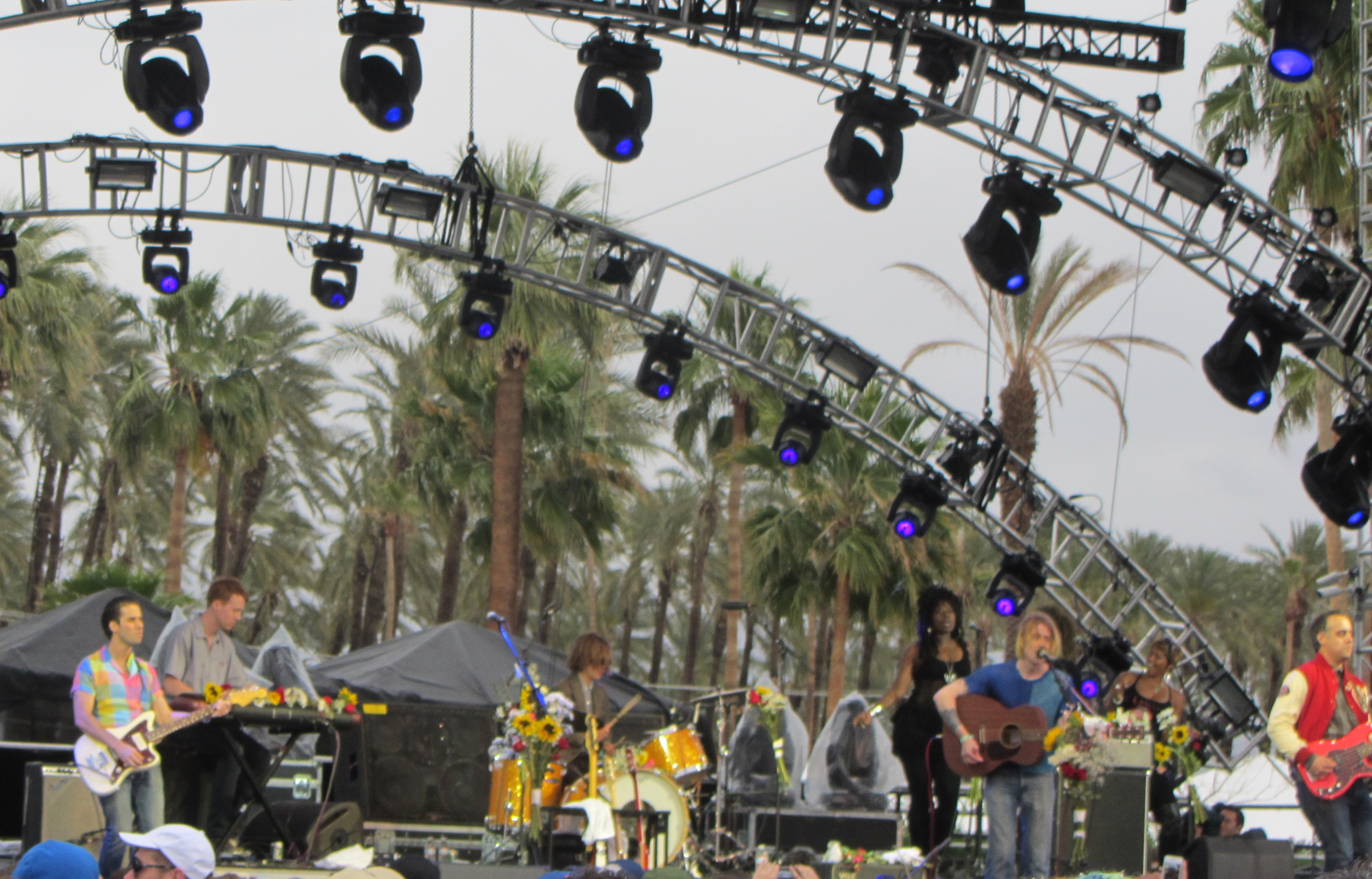
Girls playing at Coachella.

Like Album, Father, Son, Holy Ghost received much acclaim. "Vomit" and "Honey Bunny", the first and second single from the album, received "Best New Music" designations from Pitchfork. The same website gave the album a grade of 9.3 and was ranked number five on their Top 50 Albums of 2011 list. Billboard said "with Father, Son, Holy Ghost the band has vaulted the equivalent of three albums ahead, taking the conciseness of the EP and confounding expectations." Spin gave the album a 9/10 rating, saying "with Father, Son, Holy Ghost's exquisite, beyond-indie melodies, arrangements, and musicianship (the playful "Magic," the elegant "Just a Song," the fiery "Die"), (Christopher Owens) and bassist-producer JR White flirt with perfection."

The songs on the album deal with love and Owens' drug addiction; Owens stated that he needed to detox prior to tours in order to make it through them.

Father, Son, Holy Ghost brought even more exposure to the band. The album peaked at no. 37 on the Billboard 200. On the tour in support of the album, the band performed at the St Jerome's Laneway Festival and the Coachella Valley Music and Arts Festival. In addition, the band performed songs from the album on Late Night with Jimmy Fallon and Conan.

=== Breakup and aftermath (2012) ===
On July 1, 2012, Christopher Owens announced via his Twitter feed that he was leaving the band though he will continue to record music on his own. Owens cited the band's constantly shifting lineup as the reason for his departure, saying in an interview with Pitchfork: "[W]e were replacing members for every other tour; I didn't feel like I had other people who were maturing alongside me. I counted out the amount of people that were in the band over the years. It was 21 – a giant amount of people. That's feeling disappointed 21 times over." The breaking point for Owens came when guitarist John Anderson, one of Owens' closest friends, left the band.

In a March 2013 Paste magazine article, Chet "JR" White talked to writer Philip Cosores. After the band's disbandment, White denied all requests for interviews. White told Corsores there was an initial shock after reading Owens' email and tweets about the band's breakup; but after they spoke less during the Father, Son, Holy Ghost sessions, he "knew it [the breakup] could be coming soon".

Owens released his debut solo album Lysandre on January 15, 2013. He followed this up with A New Testament in September 2014. Owens has since voiced his displeasure over the band's shared name with the HBO series Girls.

White died on October 18, 2020, in Santa Cruz, California.

== Musical style ==
Girls were heavily influenced by the music of the 1950s, 1960s, and 1970s, with their sound being described as lo-fi, surf rock, rock and roll, psychedelic rock, pop rock, country rock, and garage rock. For the band's first album Album, critics identified The Beach Boys, Elvis Costello, Buddy Holly, Spiritualized, Galaxie 500, Felt, and Ariel Pink as possible influences. The band's second album, Father, Son, Holy Ghost, kept most of the surf rock sound of the first album, but also saw their sound expand into metal and gospel music. Owens named Suede as one of his major influences, and his vocal style has been compared to that of Brett Anderson.

== Discography ==
=== Albums ===
- Album (September 22, 2009), True Panther Sounds – No. 136 Billboard 200, No. 3 Billboard Top Heatseekers Albums
- Father, Son, Holy Ghost (September 13, 2011) – No. 37 Billboard 200, No. 119 UK Albums Chart

=== EPs ===
- Broken Dreams Club (November 22, 2010), True Panther Sounds

=== Singles ===
- "Lust for Life"/"Morning Light" (July 1, 2008), True Panther Sounds TRUE008
  - Format: 7" vinyl, limited to 500 copies
  1. "Lust for Life" – 2:25
  2. "Morning Light" – 2:36
- "Hellhole Ratrace" (July 6, 2009), Fantasytrashcan FANTASY001
  - Format: 10" vinyl
  1. "Hellhole Ratrace" – 6:57
  2. "Solitude" – 3:44
- "Lust for Life" (September 7, 2009), Fantasytrashcan FANTASY002
  - Format: 7" vinyl
  1. "Lust for Life" – 2:25
  2. "Life in San Francisco" – 2:21
- "Laura" (November 9, 2009), Fantasytrashcan FANTASY004
  - Format: 7" vinyl
  1. "Laura" – 4:52
  2. "Oh Boy" – 2:41
- "Morning Light" (February 22, 2010), Fantasytrashcan FANTASY005
  - Format: 7" vinyl
  1. "Morning Light" – 2:36
  2. "End of the World" – 3:35
- "Lawrence" (November 28, 2011), Fantasytrashcan FANTASY005
  - Format: 12" red heart shaped vinyl, limited to 1000 copies
  1. "Lawrence" – 4:00
- "My Ma" (March 22, 2012)
  1. "Love Life" – 2:28
  - Format: 7" vinyl, limited to 1000 copies

=== Music videos ===
- "My Ma"
- "Honey Bunny"
- "Vomit"
- "Hellhole Race"
- "Lust for Life"
