= Dominant Legs =

- Origin: San Francisco, California, US
- Genres: Indie pop, indie rock, pop rock
- Years active: 2009–present
- Label: Lefse
- Members: Ryan Lynch; Hannah Hunt; Andrew Connors; Garett Goddard; Rene Solomon

Dominant Legs is an American indie pop group formed in 2008 and based in San Francisco, California. The band's line-up is Ryan Lynch (vocals, guitar, keyboards), Hannah Hunt (vocals, keyboards), Andrew Connors (bass guitar), Garett Goddard (guitar) and Rene Solomon (drums, percussion). Dominant Legs released an extended play (EP), Young at Love and Life, in 2010 and a full-length album, Invitation, in 2011.

== History ==
Ryan Lynch, formerly of Magic Bullets and Girls, started Dominant Legs in 2008. According to Lynch, the band's name means "sexy legs" and came about while he was skinny dipping in Newport Beach. He used the term to describe the legs of Corey Cunningham of the band Terry Malts. Lynch released two demo tracks late in 2009 and was named a "band to watch" by Stereogum. Lynch met the keyboard player and vocalist Hannah Hunt through mutual friends and the pair soon started performing together. Hunt was the inspiration behind the Vampire Weekend song "Hannah Hunt" from their third album Modern Vampires of the City. The Young at Love and Life EP was released in August 2010.

Following the EP's release, the band's line-up expanded with the additions of Rene Solomon (drums), Garett Goddard (guitar) and Andrew Connors (bass guitar). The music video for the song "Hoop of Love" was premiered in August 2011; The group's first album, Invitation, was released one month later.

== Band members ==
- Ryan Lynch – vocals, guitar, keyboards
- Hannah Hunt – vocals, keyboards
- Andrew Connors – bass guitar
- Garett Goddard – guitar
- Rene Solomon – drums, percussion

== Discography ==
=== Studio album ===
| Title | Album details |
|---|---|
| Invitation | Released: September 27, 2011; Label: Lefse; Format: CD, LP, digital download |

=== Extended play ===
| Title | Album details |
|---|---|
| Young at Love and Life | Released: August 3, 2010; Label: Lefse; Format: CD, LP, digital download |
