= Free Drugs ;-) =

Studio album by Harlem
- Released: Summer 2008
- Genre: Garage rock
- Label: Self-released

Harlem chronology
Free Drugs ;-) (2008)	Hippies (2012)

Free Drugs ;-) is the first studio album by Austin, Texas based garage rock band Harlem. It was self-released in the summer of 2008.

== Critical reception ==
Pitchfork gave the album a score of 6.8 out of 10, writing "What cannot be denied, even at this early stage, is the charm behind Harlem's to-hell-with-everything swagger". Cokemachineglow gave the album 72 out of 100%, and described the album as "straightforward but also really honest".

== Track listing ==
1. "Witchgreens"
2. "Caroline"
3. "South of France"
4. "Irresistible"
5. "Beautiful & Very Smart"
6. "Psychedelic Tits"
7. "Think I'm Thinkin Bout"
8. "Disneyland"
9. "Little Black Cowboy"
10. "I'm on Drugs"
11. "Red Herring"
12. "Hundred a Dollar a Night Man"
13. "Eggs and Stank Gas"
