= True Panther =

Independent record label

True Panther Records
- Founded: 2008
- Founder: Dean Bein; Molly Samuel; Avi Klein
- Distributors: Beggars Group (selected releases), Universal Music Group (selected releases)
- Genre: Alternative rock, indie pop, electronic music, alternative hip-hop
- Country of origin: United States of America
- Location: New York City
- Official website: truepanther.com

True Panther Records (TP) is an independent record label founded by Dean Bein in San Francisco in 2008. The label eventually moved to New York, and was acquired by Matador Records of Beggars Group in 2009, remaining under that umbrella until 2017. After leaving Beggars Group, the label now goes by True Panther Records.

The label has worked with artists of various genres, including notable acts such as ABRA, Celeste, Glasser, Girls, King Krule, Oklou, Tobias Jesso Jr., Shlohmo, and Slowthai.

== History ==
True Panther Sounds was founded in 2008 by Dean Bein, Molly Samuel, and Avi Klein, who at the time were also bandmates in Red Tape Apocalypse. The group initially created the label to release the 7-inch tour-only record they had recorded in Bein's basement. After their first record sold well they decided to release another with the money, and by 2006 they were releasing projects from other artists. Samuel and Klein eventually left the label, leading Bein to relocate the business to Brooklyn, New York City.

An early success for the label came with the debut album from San Francisco band Girls, which was a joint venture between True Panther and Matador Records. The record quickly became one of the most talked about indie albums of 2009, even receiving the designation of "Best New Music" from Pitchfork. On November 4, 2009, Matador executive Gerard Cosloy announced via a blog post on the company's website that Matador had purchased True Panther Sounds. The message confirmed that like Girls' Album, future True Panther releases would be marketed and promoted by Matador.

True Panther separated from Matador Records and Beggars Group in 2017, subsequently beginning a distribution deal with Universal Music Group.

True Panther won the 2024 Libera Award and 2025 Libera Award for Label of the Year (5 or fewer employees).

== Current artists ==
As of November 2026, True Panther's roster consists of the following artists:

- Quiet Light (musician)
- Babymorocco
- Christopher Owens
- Dawuna
- Elori Saxl & Henry Solomon
- Frost Children
- Grace Ives
- Jawnino
- Kelora
- Lauren Auder
- Model/Actriz
- Oklou
- Popstar Benny
- Urika's Bedroom
- Zayok

== Alumni ==
True Panther has signed many artists in the past, including:

- Abra
- BBY Kodie
- Bbymutha
- Black Orange Juice
- Bliss Signal
- Broken Strings
- Cash Bently
- Celeste
- The Cheese
- Cloud Nothings
- Deborah’s Child
- Delorean
- DJ Spoko x DJ Mujava
- Ebhoni
- E*vax
- Girls
- Glasser
- Hoodlum
- Hunx and His Punx
- Hyetal
- Janka NabaY & the Bubu Gang
- Jonah Mutono
- Kelsey Lu
- King Krule
- Lemonade
- Lil Jabba
- Lil Silva
- London O'Connor
- Magic Kids
- MC Bin Laden
- Morning Benders
- Rainbow Bridge
- Red Tape Apocalypse
- Real Estate
- Shlohmo
- slowthai
- SoFFT
- Standing Nudes
- Strip Mall Seizures
- Tamaryn
- Tanlines
- Taragana Pyjarama
- Teengirl Fantasy
- Tint
- Tobias
- Tobias Jesso Jr
- Trash Talk
- Ty Segall
- Unknown Mortal Orchestra

== Releases ==
The following is an incomplete list of records released by True Panther Sounds:

- TRUE-001 Red Tape Apocalypse – I Fucking Love My Friends (July 2006)
- TRUE-001.5 Red Tape Apocalypse & The Cheese – Live at KDVS Split
- TRUE-002 Various Artists – Boomtown (featuring Two Gallants Trainwreck Riders Shitstorm Full Moon Partisans Hiker Biker Dirty Dirty & Cow People)
- TRUE-003 Strip Mall Seizures – No English (2006)
- TRUE-004 Standing Nudes – When I Arrive b/w Fight Song (2005)
- TRUE-005 Standing Nudes – Ghost Story (April 2008)
- TRUE-006 Broken Strings – Broken Strings (June 2008)
- TRUE-008 Girls – "Lust For Life b/w Morning Light" (September 2009)
- TRUE-009 Lemonade – Lemonade (October 2009)
- TRUE-010 Girls – Album (September 2009)
- TRUE-011 Glasser – Apply (May 2009)
- TRUE-012 Hunx and His Punx – "Doncha Want Me Back/The Last Time" (2009)
- TRUE-013 Girls – Hellhole Ratrace (July 2009)
- TRUE-014 Ty Segall – "Universal Momma/86'd" (2009)
- TRUE-015 The Fly Girlz – Da' Bratz from Da' Ville (March 2009)
- TRUE-016 Girls – Laura (November 2010)
- TRUE-017 Rainbow Bridge – Big Wave Rider (September 2009)
- TRUE-018 Girls – "Lust For Life / Honey Bunny" (September 2009)
- TRUE-019 Tamaryn – Mild Confusion / Light Shadows (December 2009)
- TRUE-020 Tanlines – Settings (March 2010)
- TRUE-021 Lemonade – Pure Moods (March 2010)
- TRUE-022 Hunx and His Punx – Gay Singles (February 2010)
- TRUE-023 Magic Kids – Memphis (June 2010)
- TRUE-024 Ahmed Janka Nabay – Bubu King (March 2010)
- TRUE-025 Glasser – Ring (October 2010)
- TRUE-026 Teengirl Fantasy – 7 A.M. (September 2010)
- TRUE-027 Tanlines – Real Life (March 2010)
- TRUE-028 Real Estate – Out of Tune / Reservoir #3 (June 2010)
- TRUE-029 The Morning Benders – Promises (February 2010)
- TRUE-030 Delorean – Subiza (April 2010)
- TRUE-031 Janka Nabay – Good Governance (2010)
- TRUE-032 Girls – Morning Light (2010)
- TRUE-033 Delorean – Stay Close (2010)
- TRUE-035 Girls – Father Son Holy Ghost (September 2011)
- TRUE-036 Lemonade – Lifted Remixes (June 2010)
- TRUE-037 Cloud Nothings – Leave You Forever (October 2010)
- TRUE-038 Delorean – "Stay Close" (2010)
- TRUE-039 Delorean – Real Love (2010)
- TRUE-040 Girls – Broken Dreams Club (November 2010)
- TRUE-041 Magic Kids – Summer (June 2010)
- TRUE-042 Delorean – Real Love Remixes (July 2010)
- TRUE-043 Magic Kids – Superball (August 2010)
- TRUE-048 Glasser – Home (September 2010)
- TRUE-049 Glasser – Rough Trade Bonus Disc (2010)
- TRUE-050 Unknown Mortal Orchestra – Unknown Mortal Orchestra (2011)
- TRUE-051 Girls – Heartbreaker (2010)
- TRUE-052 Glasser – Mirrorage (2010)
- TRUE-053 Outer Limits Recordings – $20 Bill (2011)
- TRUE-055 Glasser – iTunes Live: SXSW (2011)
- TRUE-056 Unknown Mortal Orchestra – How Can U Luv Me? (2011)
- TRUE-059 Trash Talk (band) – Awake (October 2011)
- TRUE-060 King Krule – King Krule EP (November 2011)
- TRUE-061 Les Demoniaques – Teenage Lust (July 2011)
- TRUE-062 Wet Illustrated – 1X1X1 (October 2011)
- TRUE-063 Janka Nabay and the Bubu Gang – An Letah (March 2012)
- TRUE-065 Silent Diane – Capella (August 2011)
- TRUE-066 Tanlines – Mixed Emotions (March 2012)
- TRUE-067 Little Red – Midnight Remember (October 2011)
- TRUE-070 Delorean – Grow (May 2011)
- TRUE-075 Lemonade – Diver (June 2012)
- TRUE-077 Girls – Lawrence (December 2011)
- TRUE-080 Hyetal – Northwest Passage (May 2013)
- TRUE-081 Girls – Ma Ma (May 2012)
- TRUE-082 Lemonade – Neptune (April 2012)
- TRUE-085 Teengirl Fantasy – Traver (August 2012)
- TRUE-088 DJ Spoko – Ghost Town EP (March 2013)
- TRUE-090 Glasser – Interiors (October 2013)
- TRUE-092 Delorean – APAR (September 2014)
- TRUE-095 Hyetal – Modern Worship (June 2013)
- TRUE-099 Tobias Jesso Jr. – Goon (March 2015)
- TRUE-101 King Krule – 6 Feet Beneath The Moon (August 2014)
- TRUE-102 Black Orange Juice – 3 Started Alone (September 2013)
- TRUE-103 Road To Shaanxi – Revelation EP (September 2014)
- TRUE-104 LiL JaBBa – Gully (August 2014)
- TRUE-105 DJ Spoko x DJ Mujava Intelligent Mental Institution (August 2016)
- TRUE-106 Lil Silva – Mabel EP (August 2014)
- TRUE-107 Tint – My New Murex (July 2015)
- TRUE-108 Shlohmo – Emerge From Smoke / Ode 2 Tha Whip (March 2015)
- TRUE-110 Tanlines – Highlights (May 2015)
- TRUE-111 Shlohmo – Dark Red (April 2015)
- TRUE-112 Taragana Pyjarama – Ariel EP (May 2015)
- TRUE-113 MC Bin Laden – É Grau (June 2017)
- TRUE-114 London O'Connor – O∆ (February 2017)
- TRUE-120 Archy Marshall – A New Place to Drown (2015)
- TRUE-123 ABRA Princess EP (August 2016)
- TRUE-124 Tobias Jesso Jr. – True Love / Without You (Alternate Version) (September 2015)
- TRUE-125 Kelsey Lu – Church EP (July 2016)
- TRUE-126 King Krule – The Ooz (October 2017)

== See also ==
- List of record labels
- Independent record label
- Independent music
- Record labels based in New York (state)
