= Glasser (musician) =

American singer-songwriter

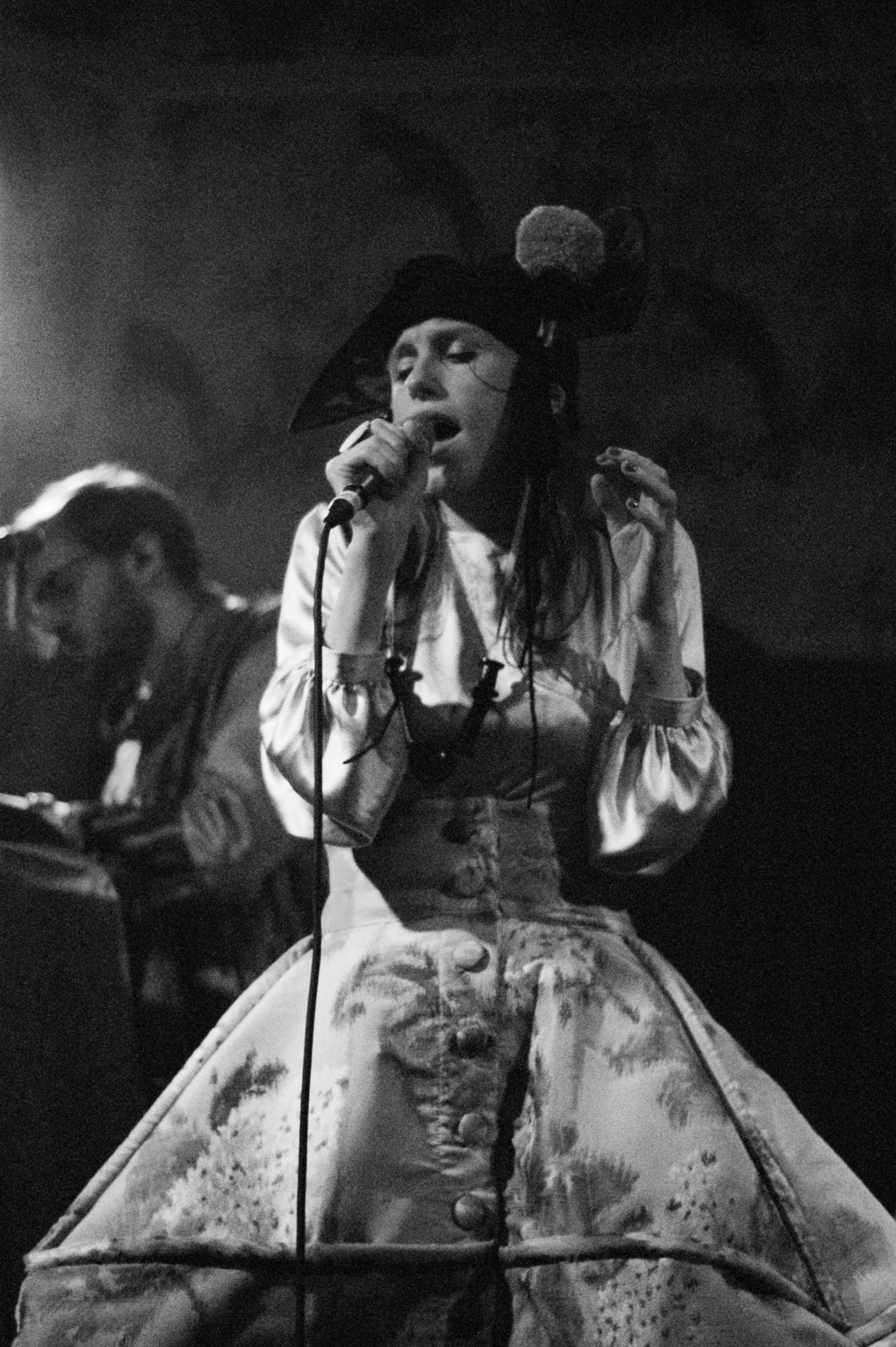
- Glasser performing in 2011

Background information
- Born: Cameron Mesirow; 1983 or 1984 (age 41–42); Boston, Massachusetts, U.S.
- Genres: Synth-pop; dream pop; indietronica; experimental
- Occupations: Singer; songwriter; record producer
- Years active: 2009–present
- Labels: True Panther Sounds
- Website: www.glassermusic.com

Cameron Mesirow (born 1983), known professionally as Glasser, is an American singer, songwriter, and record producer. Signed to True Panther Sounds, she released her debut EP Apply in 2009. Her debut studio album Ring followed in 2010. Her second studio album Interiors was released in 2013. After a hiatus, Mesirow returned to the Glasser project with the 2023 studio album Crux.

== Early life ==
Mesirow was born in Boston, Massachusetts. Her father is a member of the Blue Man Group in Berlin, and her mother, Casey Cameron, is one of the founders of new wave band Human Sexual Response. Following her parents' divorce, she relocated to the San Francisco Bay Area at age ten. She had some piano lessons as a child, and performed in musicals at school. Mesirow eventually studied German and literature at San Francisco State University, where she met Foreign Born singer Matt Popieluch, who helped draw out her songwriting abilities.

== Career ==
According to Mesirow, the name "Glasser" was inspired by "a midnight vision of a figure hovering over water".

In early 2009, Glasser's track "Apply" was featured on the eMusic compilation Selected + Collected and the song was later described by Pitchfork as "one of the disc's standouts [...] a great mix of electronic drag and skyward pop [that] showcased Mesirow's impressive vocal range."

In May 2009, Glasser played her first show without prerecorded parts, in support of her first EP, Apply. At that point Mesirow and Popieluch were living in the Los Feliz neighborhood of Los Angeles and the act was described as "LA-based." Mesirow was at the time working in the studio of artist Mike Kelley. Glasser's live shows featured performances by the dance troupe Body City and Mesirow wore custom outfits by local designer Ida Falck Øien. According to the LA Weekly, "'Apply' and its sister songs — the swooning 'Learn,' haunted shuffler 'Glad' or the Kate Bush–meets-Cluster 'Tremel' — do sport the built-in intimacy common to good bedroom recordings, but they also possess hints of grandiose and mercurial qualities."

The Apply EP was followed over a year later by Glasser's first full-length studio album, Ring, co-produced by Swedish producer Van Rivers and the Subliminal Kid. According to Pitchfork, "there isn't an easy descriptor for Glasser's sound-- she incorporates bits of tropical pop, tribal percussion, and a couple of different strains of electronic music. Her songs sidestep traditionally linear arrangements for a more open, circular approach-- they kind of swoosh around without pausing at verse-chorus intersections."

Glasser's second album, Interiors, came out in 2013. The album was inspired, according to Mesirow, by Dutch architect and theorist Rem Koolhaas' 1978 book Delirious New York. The album's themes and sounds reflected the artist's move from Los Angeles to downtown Manhattan. "The interiors Glasser explores," wrote Pitchfork, "most compellingly are, it won't surprise you at this point to learn, the ones within human beings. She applies the same ruthless precision to these ostensibly messier subjects, so that video selection "Design", an examination of physical desire that wields human breaths as percussion, is crystalline enough for a posh gallery. But the insides of people turn out to be at least as unknowable as those of buildings."

In 2018, Glasser resurfaced with the self-released, experimental EP Sextape, featuring spoken word descriptions of a variety of sexual experiences over danceable beats. Pitchfork commended the project for engaging "directly with the thorniness of queer intimacy, the complications that arise when queer people seek each other out to dance, to flirt, and to fuck each other."

In 2022, Glasser again resurfaced with a single titled "New Scars", released on One Little Independent Records.

Glasser said she also has "a couple of other songs that are not on the record", such as "Save Me" that was made prominent by an X Games video on YouTube.

== Style ==
Glasser has been compared to Joni Mitchell, Björk and Cocteau Twins.

== Discography ==
=== Studio albums ===
List of studio albums, with selected details and chart positions
Title	Album details	Peak chart positions	
Title	Album details	US Dance	US Heat
Ring	Released: September 24, 2010; Label: True Panther Sounds; Formats: CD, LP, digital download	9	18
Interiors	Released: October 4, 2013; Label: True Panther Sounds; Formats: CD, LP, digital download	15	32
Crux	Released: October 6, 2023; Label: One Little Independent; Formats: CD, LP, digital download	—	—

=== Extended plays ===
List of EPs, with selected details
Title	EP details
Apply	Released: May 26, 2009; Label: True Panther Sounds; Formats: 12", digital download
iTunes Live: SXSW	Released: March 20, 2011; Label: True Panther Sounds; Formats: Digital download
Sextape	Released: April 6, 2018; Label: Self-released; Formats: Digital download

=== Singles ===
List of singles
Title	Year	Album
"Glad"	2009	Apply
"Tremel"	2010	Ring
"Home"	2010	Ring
"Shape"	2013	Interiors
"Design"	2013	Interiors
"New Scars"	2022	Non-album single
"Vine"	2023	Crux
"Drift"	2023	Crux
"All Lovers"	2023	Crux
"Easy"	2023	Crux
