= Matador Records =

American independent record label

- Parent company: Beggars Group
- Founded: 1989
- Founder: Chris Lombardi
- Distributors: Matador Direct; via Redeye (USA); Beggars Group; via PIAS (Europe); Beggars Group Digital (global digital)
- Genre: Rock, indie rock, experimental, electronic
- Country of origin: USA
- Location: New York City; London
- Official website: matadorrecords.com

Matador Records is an independent record label, with a selection of mainly indie rock, but also punk rock, experimental rock, alternative rock, and electronic acts.

== History ==
Matador was created in 1989 by Chris Lombardi in his New York City apartment. Lombardi had brought the Austrian duo H.P. Zinker into Wharton Tiers' Fun City studio to record Matador's first release, "...and there was light". Lombardi continued to add artists to the label's roster, with bands like the Dustdevils, Railroad Jerk and Superchunk, before being joined by former Homestead Records manager Gerard Cosloy in 1990.

Lombardi and Cosloy have continued to run Matador Records together with Patrick Amory coming on as Matador's label manager in 1994, later becoming label president as well as a partner of Lombardi and Cosloy. Matador first drew mainstream media attention and larger sales with the North American release of Teenage Fanclub's debut record, A Catholic Education in 1990. Other early releases that bolstered the label included Pavement's debut studio album Slanted and Enchanted in 1992 and Liz Phair's debut album, Exile in Guyville in 1993.

1993 also saw Matador enter into a partnership with Atlantic Records which lasted for several years. In 1996, Capitol Records purchased a 49 percent stake in Matador, which Lombardi and Cosloy bought back in 1999. Beggars Group purchased 50% of Matador in 2002 and took over the label's worldwide marketing.

Over the years, the label has moved to larger and larger premises, and it now operates in both London and New York. Matador Europe supervises the promotion, sales and marketing of Matador titles in Europe. The London-based office has also licensed recordings from some North American artists, such as M. Ward, Sleater-Kinney, Modest Mouse, and Superchunk. The roster has grown with the label, and Matador has helped artists such as Yo La Tengo, Cat Power, Cornelius, Solex, Pizzicato Five, Helium and the Arsonists reach audiences worldwide.

In the early 2000s, Matador had to sidestep unwanted involvement in the Recording Industry Association of America dispute over peer-to-peer file sharing networks. Matador's Patrick Amory contacted the RIAA multiple times in order to ensure that an erroneous listing on the group's website of Matador as an RIAA member was removed. After several attempts, the name of the independent label was removed from the membership list. Despite Matador's removal from the RIAA list, four of the label's albums have been certified Gold for sales of at least 500,000 units by the association: Exile in Guyville and Whip-Smart by Liz Phair and Turn on the Bright Lights and Antics by Interpol.

Matador acquired True Panther Sounds as an imprint in 2009. Cosloy, speaking through the Matador blog, stated that True Panther Sounds "will continue to be managed by label founder Dean Bein." And that the reason Matador acquired True Panther Sounds was simply, "As Victor Kiam once explained his decision to purchase the Remington Shaver operation, "I liked it so much, I bought the company." The first joint venture by the two labels was Girls' debut critically acclaimed release Album and was "worked through Matador's fearsome promotional & marketing machinery."

In October 2010, Matador celebrated the label's 21st anniversary with a series of concerts at the Palms Casino Resort in Las Vegas. Included amongst the performers were Pavement, Yo La Tengo, the New Pornographers, Spoon, Ted Leo & the Pharmacists, Guided By Voices, Kurt Vile, Cold Cave, Fucked Up, Liz Phair, Shearwater, Superchunk, Come, Times New Viking, Belle & Sebastian, Cat Power, Chavez, Perfume Genius, Harlem, and Guitar Wolf.

Matador has continued to sign bands of various genres including Iceage, Lower, Algiers, Majical Cloudz, Car Seat Headrest and Snail Mail.

== Current artists ==
As of April 2024, Matador's roster consists of the following artists:

- Algiers
- Bar Italia
- Belle and Sebastian
- Butthole Surfers
- Car Seat Headrest
- Circuit des Yeux
- Darkside
- David Byrne
- Desert Sessions
- Gang of Four
- Horsegirl
- Julien Baker
- Kim Gordon
- King Krule
- Lifeguard
- Mdou Moctar
- Muzz
- Pavement
- Perfume Genius
- Queens of the Stone Age
- Snail Mail
- Spoon
- Stephen Malkmus
- Steve Gunn
- Water from Your Eyes
- Yo La Tengo

== Past artists ==
Matador has signed many notable artists in the past, including:

- 18th Dye
- A. C. Newman
- Aereogramme
- Arab Strap
- Arsonists
- Bailter Space
- Barbara Manning
- Bardo Pond
- Bettie Serveert
- Boards of Canada
- Boygenius
- Brightblack Morning Light
- Bullet LaVolta
- Cat Power
- Ceremony
- Chain Gang
- Chavez
- Chelsea Light Moving
- Chris Knox
- Circle X
- Cold Cave
- Come
- Cornelius
- Couch
- Dälek
- Dave Schramm
- David Kilgour
- Dead Meadow
- Demolition Doll Rods
- Dizzee Rascal
- Dustdevils
- Early Man
- Erika M. Anderson
- Esben and the Witch
- Flipper
- Fucked Up
- God Help the Girl
- Graeme Downes
- Guided by Voices
- Guitar Wolf
- Harlem
- Helium
- Interpol
- Jad Fair & Yo La Tengo
- Jaguar Love
- Jay Reatard
- Jega
- Jennifer O'Connor
- Jimi Tenor
- Jon Spencer Blues Explosion
- Khan
- Kurt Vile
- Kustomized
- Large Professor
- Laura Cantrell
- Lavender Diamond
- Lemonade
- Lesser
- Liz Phair
- Lou Reed
- Love Of Diagrams
- Lucy Dacus
- Lyres
- M. Ward
- Magic Kids
- Majical Cloudz
- Mark Eitzel
- Mary Timony
- Matmos
- MC Paul Barman
- Mecca Normal
- Mission of Burma
- Modest Mouse
- Mogwai
- Moonshake
- Mr. Len
- Neko Case
- Nightmares On Wax
- Non Phixion
- Pell Mell
- Pitchblende
- Pizzicato Five
- Plone
- Pole
- Portastatic
- Preston School of Industry
- Pretty Girls Make Graves
- Prisonshake
- Quickspace
- Railroad Jerk
- Red Snapper
- Robert Pollard
- Run On
- Sensational
- Shearwater
- Silkworm
- Sleater-Kinney
- Smog
- Solex
- Sonic Youth
- Spiral Stairs
- Sportsguitar
- Superchunk
- Techno Animal
- Ted Leo and the Pharmacists
- Teenage Fanclub
- Thalia Zedek
- The Cave Singers
- The Clean
- The Fall
- The For Carnation
- The Frogs
- The Fucking Champs
- The Pastels
- The Ponys
- The Soft Boys
- The Wisdom of Harry
- The Young
- Thinking Fellers Union Local 282
- Times New Viking
- Tobin Sprout
- Toiling Midgets
- Tommy Keene
- Two Lone Swordsmen
- Unrest
- Unsane
- Unwound
- Void

== See also ==
- List of record labels
