= Album (Girls album) =

Studio album by Girls
- Released: September 22, 2009
- Genre: Indie pop, indie rock, surf rock, jangle pop, dream pop
- Length: 44:17
- Label: True Panther Sounds
- Producer: Chet "JR" White

Girls chronology
Album (2009)	Broken Dreams Club (2010)

Singles from Album
- 1. "Hellhole Ratrace" Released: July 6, 2009; 2. "Lust for Life" Released: September 7, 2009; 3. "Laura" Released: November 9, 2009; 4. "Morning Light" Released: February 22, 2010

Album is the debut studio album by the American band Girls. It was released September 22, 2009, on True Panther Sounds.

== Critical reception ==
Professional ratings
Aggregate scores
Source	Rating
AnyDecentMusic?	7.5/10
Metacritic	80/100
Review scores
Source	Rating
AllMusic	4/5 stars
The A.V. Club	B+
The Guardian	5/5 stars
Mojo	4/5 stars
MSN Music (Consumer Guide)	A−
NME	9/10
Pitchfork	9.1/10
Q	3/5 stars
Rolling Stone	3.5/5 stars
Uncut	4/5 stars

Initial critical response to Album was extremely positive. At Metacritic, which assigns a normalized rating out of 100 to reviews from mainstream critics, the album has received an average score of 80, based on 22 reviews. Tom Breihan of Pitchfork writes, "Album is mostly sunny Beach Boys pastiche, but it's not the kajillionth indie attempt at orchestral Pet Sounds majesty. Rather, it's simple and forthright early Beach Boys stuff: compact guitar-jangles, sha-la-la harmonies, muffled heartbeat drums. It sounds great." Jason Lymangrover of AllMusic states, "As a whole, everything's relaxed and dreamy, perfectly matching the '70s aesthetic of their videos: washed out with overexposed sun streaks and a Crayola watercolor palette." Will Dean of The Guardian says, "The duo combine deceptively simple chords and patterns with hazy walls of feedback, Californian pop melodies, surf guitars and Owens's dozy vocal style – which sounds like he's answering a question you asked him yesterday. The result is glorious."

=== Accolades ===
Album was awarded the fifth spot on Spin magazine's best albums of 2009 list and tenth on Pitchfork's "The Top 50 Albums of 2009" list. Pitchfork also awarded it "Best New Music" upon release.

== Track listing ==
All tracks are written by Christopher Owens, except where noted.

No.	Title	Length
1.	"Lust for Life"	2:25
2.	"Laura"	4:51
3.	"Ghost Mouth"	3:11
4.	"God Damned"	2:17
5.	"Big Bad Mean Motherfucker"	2:15
6.	"Hellhole Ratrace"	6:56
7.	"Headache"	4:00
8.	"Summertime"	5:39
9.	"Lauren Marie"	4:58
10.	"Morning Light"	2:36
11.	"Curls"	2:08
12.	"Darling"	2:59

Australia and Brazil bonus tracks
No.	Title	Length
13.	"Solitude"	3:44
14.	"Life in San Francisco"	2:21

Korea and Japan bonus tracks
No.	Title	Length
13.	"Solitude"	3:44
14.	"Oh Boy!"	2:41
15.	"Life in San Francisco"	2:21
16.	"End of the World" (writers: Arthur Kent, Sylvia Dee)	3:35

== Personnel ==
Adapted from the album liner notes.

- Chet "JR" White – producer, bass guitar
- Tom Marzella – drums (track 10)
- Garett Godard – drums (tracks 2, 3, 5, 12)
- Myles Benham Cooper – beach sounds (track 7)
- Christopher Owens – cover art, girls photos
- Sandy Kim – band photography
- John Goodmansos – mixing
- John Golden – mastering

== Charts ==
Chart (2009)	Peak position
US Billboard 200	136
US Independent Albums (Billboard)	24
US Heatseekers Albums (Billboard)	3

As of 2012 the album has sold 50,000 copies in United States according to Nielsen SoundScan.

== Release history ==
Country	Date	Label	Format	Catalogue #
United States	September 22, 2009	True Panther Sounds	CD	TRUE-010
United States	September 22, 2009	True Panther Sounds	LP	TRUE-010-1
United Kingdom	September 28, 2009	Fantasytrashcan	CD	FANTASY003
United Kingdom	September 28, 2009	Fantasytrashcan	LP	FANTASY003LP
Australia	October 10, 2009	Pod/Inertia	CD (with 2 bonus tracks)	PODCD0735
Japan	October 21, 2009	Turnstile/Fantasytrashcan	CD (with 4 bonus tracks)	YRCG-90027
Brazil	June 28, 2010	Lab 344	CD (with 2 bonus tracks)	5051083047111
