= Holy Shit (band) =

American rock band

- Origin: Los Angeles, California, U.S.
- Genre: Indie rock
- Years active: 2000s–present
- Members: Matt Fishbeck
- Past members: Ariel Pink
- Website: veryholyshit.com

Holy Shit is an American rock band formed in Los Angeles in the early 2000s. Originally a duo consisting of Matt Fishbeck and Ariel Pink, it has evolved to be essentially a Fishbeck solo project. They have released only two LPs: Stranded at Two Harbors (2006) and Solid Rain (2017).

== Discography ==
Studio albums

- Stranded at Two Harbors (2006)
- Solid Rain (2017)
