= Ariel Pink discography =

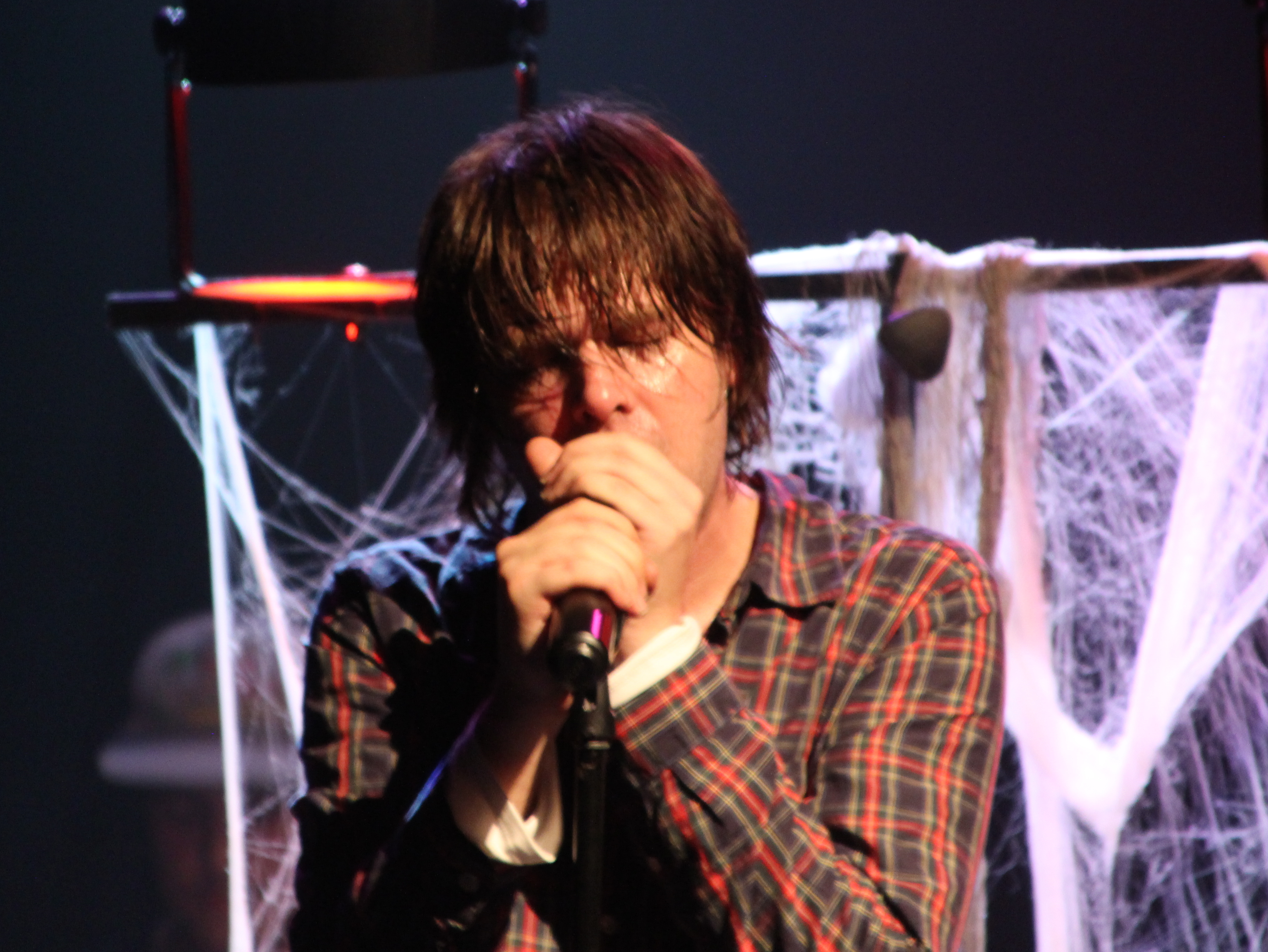
Ariel Pink performing in 2017

Ariel Pink (born Ariel Marcus Rosenberg on June 24, 1978) is a Los Angeles–based indie artist and musician. He boasts a cult following and endorsements from more widely known artists such as fellow founding Paw Tracks group Animal Collective.

== Studio albums ==
Haunted Graffiti original series

Year	Album title	Label	Series #
1999	Underground	Independent release	Haunted Graffiti 1
2000	The Doldrums	Independent release	Haunted Graffiti 2
2001	Scared Famous / Fast Forward	Independent release	Haunted Graffiti 3/4
2002	House Arrest / Lover Boy	Independent release	Haunted Graffiti 5/6
2003	Worn Copy	Rhystop	Haunted Graffiti 8

Haunted Graffiti reissued series

Year	Album title	Label	Series #
2004	The Doldrums	Paw Tracks	Haunted Graffiti 2 (reissue)
2005	Worn Copy	Paw Tracks	Haunted Graffiti 8 (reissue)
2005	House Arrest	Paw Tracks	Haunted Graffiti 5 (reissue)
2006	Lover Boy	Ballbearings Pinatas	Haunted Graffiti 6 (reissue)
2007	Underground	Vinyl International	Haunted Graffiti 1 (reissue)
2007	Scared Famous / Fast Forward	Human Ear Music	Haunted Graffiti 3/4 (17 tracks from the 2001 release of Scared Famous / Fast Forward)

Later album releases

Year	Album title	Label	Peak positions
Year	Album title	Label	US
2010	Before Today	4AD	163
2012	Mature Themes	4AD	136
2014	Pom Pom	4AD	150
2017	Dedicated to Bobby Jameson	Mexican Summer	193
2025	With You Every Night	LAC Records	–

== Collaborative albums ==
Ariel Pink & R. Stevie Moore

Year	Album title	Label
2012	Ku Klux Glam	Stroll On / Big Love

Ariel Pink & kingcon2k11

Year	Album title	Label
2024	Ariel's Not Abducted	AjA Records

== Compilation albums ==
Year	Album title	Label
2008	Odditties Sodomies Vol. 1	Vinyl International
2019	Odditties Sodomies Vol. 2	Mexican Summer
2020	Odditties Sodomies Vol. 3	Mexican Summer
2021	Sit n' Spin	Mexican Summer
2021	Archevil	AjA Records
2021	Songs from Spider City	Dark Side Family Jams

== Other albums ==
- 2011: Ariel Pink's Picks Vol. 1 (R. Stevie Moore compilation; curated by Nick Noto [APDS])
- 2012: Ariel Rosenberg's Thrash & Burn (Human Ear Music)
- 2013: Early Live Recordings (Human Ear Music)
- 2022: The Key of Joy is Disobedience (Ariel Pink's Dark Side feat. Vampiros)
- 2023: Never Made A Demo, Ever (Ariel Pink's Dark Side)

== EPs and singles ==
- 2003: Holy Shit EP with Matt Fishbeck (Haunted Graffiti 7)
- 2005: Pedestrian Pop Hits (Southern Records)
- 2006: Gates of Zion / Ghosts (Mistletone)
- 2006: My Molly EP (Tiny Creatures)
- 2006: Ariel Friedman EP (Human Ear Music, digital)
- 2006: Stranded at Two Harbors with Holy Shit (UUAR)
- 2007: Witchhunt Suite for WW3 (Melted Mailbox)
- 2008: Before Today (Asthmatic Kitty, single)
- 2008: Can't Hear My Eyes / Evolution's a Lie (Mexican Summer)
- 2009: Shits & Giggles (Trick or Treat, Free Dope)
- 2009: Kind of Kind / RSM's Brain (Big Love)
- 2009: Reminiscences EP (Cooler Cat)
- 2010: Round and Round / Mistaken Wedding (4AD)
- 2010: With Added Pizzazz (Free Dope)
- 2011: I'm Not a Genius EP (JesusWarhol, digital)
- 2012: Baby with Dam-Funk (Light in the Attic, cover)
- 2012: Cloak & Dagger with Neil Schuh (Origami Vinyl)
- 2012: SteviePink JavaScript with R. Stevie Moore (PIAPTK)
- 2012: Ku Klux Glam EP with R. Stevie Moore (Slowboy)
- 2013: Hang On to Life / No Real Friend with Jorge Elbrecht (Mexican Summer)
- 2015: I Need a Minute / Hall of Screams (Heaven Knows What soundtrack)
- 2017: Non-Sequitur Segues (Mexican Summer)
- 2017: Another Weekend / Ode to the Goat (Mexican Summer)
- 2017: Myths 002 EP with Weyes Blood (Mexican Summer)
- 2017: Ash Ra Temple Experience with Manuel Göttsching (MG Art)
- 2018: Willing & Able / Bogalusa with Black Moth Super Rainbow (Rad Cult)
- 2020: Iron Worrier / Burned Out Love (Mexican Summer, digital)
- 2020: TFW No GF (Play Nice, soundtrack)
- 2022: Rudolphs Laptop with Winston Marshall (digital)
- 2023: I Wanna Be a Girl (AjA Records, Dark Side Family Jams)

== Compilation appearances ==
- 2003: Want Me (Kittridge Records compilation)
- 2004: Interesting Results (Sonic Arts Network)
- 2005: Jules Lost His Jewels (The Wire Tapper)
- 2005: Omen (Light Dead Sea compilation)
- 2006: Every Night I Die at Miyagi's (Uncut sampler)
- 2007: Everybody ('Through the Wilderness: A Tribute to Madonna', Manimal compilation)

== Underground releases ==
- 1996: The Nile Pan pt. 1-11
- 1996: Kids On Drugs
- 1996: Kraftwerk / Experiments
- 1996: Dove
- 1997: Death Dorm 1–4
- 1997: tape 1
- 1997: metamorfosi / INUMI
- 1997: Equus 1 & 3
- 1997: Master 1 & 2
- 1997: Bianca (Live & Demos)
- 1998: Hum It in the Streets / Papermasche
- 1998: Gorilla / Appleasians (Live & Demos)
- 1998: Cemeteries / Railroads
- 1999: Spires in the Snow EP
- 1999: Young Pilot Astray / Fantasm EP
- 1999: Birth of Haunted Graffiti Live
- 2000: Mother of God / Orange S*NS Live

== Tour only ==
- 2005: Welcome 2 Our World / Nighttime is Great! (tour-only compilations of rarities)
- 2007: YAS DuDette / Hot Saucers (tour-only compilations of rarities)
- 2008: Live at Pacific Palace Aids / Rarities (Just for You!) (tour-only compilations of rarities)
- 2009: Grandes Exitos (tour-only greatest hits compilation)

== Guest appearances ==
- 2000: Guitar, bass, drums, vocals, on Rebecca Lynn – Face Down in the Lap of Luxury (Headchange Records)
- 2000: Guest vocalist on Centimeters – The Lifetime Achievement Awards (Skin Graft Records)
- 2000: Guest appearance on R. Stevie Moore's – The Jinx, Report Card, Conscientious Objector (self released)
- 2001: Mouth drums and bass on coL – 26 (JesusWarhol)
- 2002: Bass on coL – Oh, Lindsay (JesusWarhol) and Forgotten (JesusWarhol)
- 2004: Guest vocalist on All Night Radio – Spirit Stereo Frequency (Sub Pop)
- 2004: Production credits on John Maus – Songs (Upset The Rhythm)
- 2007: Guest appearance on Vibe Central – HitSongs (Human Ear Music)
- 2008: Production credits on Gary War – New Raytheonport (SHDWPLY Records)
- 2008: Mouth drums on Astrid Quay's version of The Cure's "The Caterpillar" on Perfect as Cats: a tribute to The Cure (Manimal Vinyl)
- 2010: Guest appearance on "Hong Kong (Lady of Love)" with Lushlife (Western Vinyl)
- 2011: Vocals on Daft Punk/TRS-80 – "Sky Sailor (Float Away)"
- 2011: Vocals/Mouth Drums/Drum Loop/Bass/Guitar on Atheif – Similarly Different EP (JesusWarhol)
- 2012: Music for "Daddy Don't Go" track on Raw Thrills Sick Steez album released on Sixteen Tambourines (Japan)
- 2013: Guest appearance on "Suicide Mission" with Outer Limits Recordings on the "Birds, Bees, Babys, Bacteria" album
- 2014: Bass on Cassie Ramone's The Time Has Come (Loglady)
- 2015: Vocals, bass and keyboards on Soko – My Dreams Dictate My Reality (Because Music)
- 2015: Vocals on Miley Cyrus – "Tiger Dreams", Miley Cyrus and Her Dead Petz
- 2015: Vocals on Mild High Club – "The Chat" (Circle Star Records)
- 2016: Featured on Drugdealer – "Easy to Forget" (Domino Records)
- 2016: Featured on Theophilus London – "Revenge" (Fool's Gold Records)
- 2017: Featured on Drugdealer – "Easy to Forget" (Domino Records)
- 2018: Vocals, guitar, synth on MGMT – "She Works Out Too Much", " When You Die" on Little Dark Age (Columbia)
- 2018: Featured on Part Time – "I Can Treat You Better" (Burger/Tough Love)
- 2019: Featured on Royal Trux Pink Stuff remix EP
- 2020: Vocals, Drums, Electric Guitar on Yung Lean "Starz"
