= Alex Kazemi =

Canadian artist (born 1994)

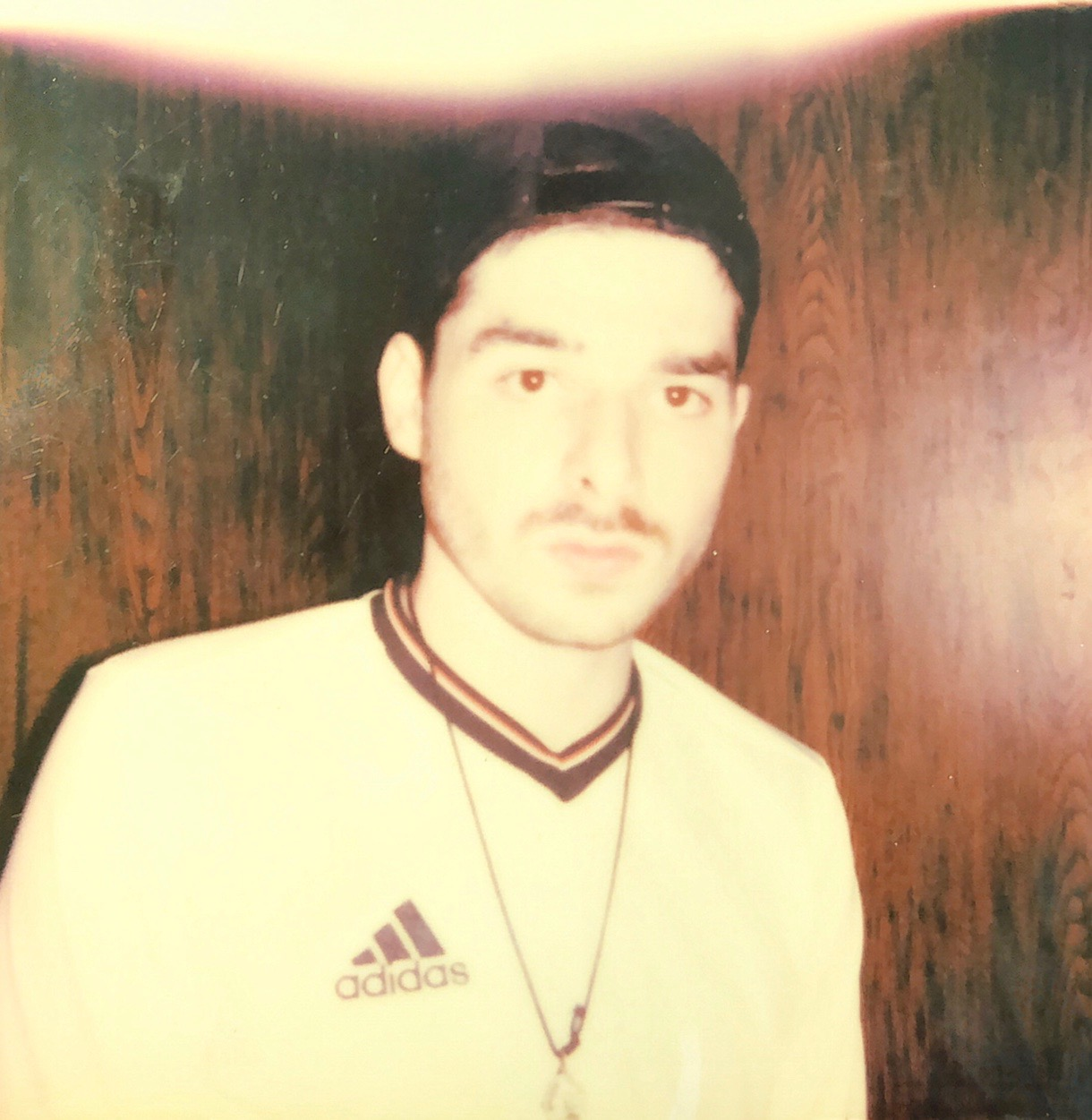
- Born: June 22, 1994 (age 31); Vancouver, British Columbia, Canada
- Occupations: Writer, pop artist, journalist
- Website: alexkazemi.com

Alex Kazemi (born June 22, 1994) is a Canadian pop artist, author, journalist and chief executive officer of VOID Collective. He is best known as the writer of Pop Magick: A Simple Guide to Bending Your Reality, released in February 2020 with a foreword by Rose McGowan.

== Career ==
In 2009, Kazemi worked as managing editor of Prim magazine for three years, working alongside editor-in-chief Kristin Prim. In 2017, Kazemi released a series of Marilyn Manson video ads for the album Heaven Upside Down that were pulled by Manson due to timing. He currently works as a regular contributor at V magazine and editor of his own publication, The Advisor.

=== Yours Truly, Brad Sela and New Millennium Boyz ===
In 2013, Kazemi wrote his first novel, titled Yours Truly, Brad Sela. After uploading a 50-page excerpt online, it quickly received attention and reached over 132,000 views. In 2014, he signed a book deal with MTV Books for the manuscript. Kazemi has since taken down the excerpt online. It was planned for publication in 2017. In 2023, with Permuted Press, Kazemi published a final version of the novel, now titled New Millennium Boyz. It follows an adolescent boy named Brad Sela growing up in 2000s America. The book has received praise from writers such as Bret Easton Ellis and Poppy Z. Brite.

=== Snapchat: Mudditchgirl91 ===
In 2015, Oyster premiered his short film live on Snapchat, titled Snapchat: Mudditchgirl91. The film was directed by Kazemi and starred Bella McFadden, who goes by @internetgirl online. The film was reviewed by numerous outlets including Playboy, Paper Magazine, i-D, and Bullett. The film was discussed in Nancy Jo Sales' book, American Girls: Social Media And The Secret Lives Of Teenagers.

=== The Advisor ===
In April 2016, Kazemi launched The Advisor, which describes itself as "a new digital platform that features handwritten open letters penned by contemporary male icons to young men". The Advisor has published letters from notable individuals such as Richard Kern, Bruce LaBruce, Justin Tranter, and Moby.

=== King Kong Magazine ===
In 2018, Kazemi was a guest pop editor at King Kong Magazine and guest features editor at King Kong Garçon's first edition.

== Personal life ==
Kazemi is demisexual.

== Bibliography ==
Fiction

- New Millennium Boyz (2023)

Non-Fiction

- Pop Magick: A Simple Guide to Bending Your Reality (2020)

== Songwriting discography ==
Release year	Artist	Album	Credit	Notes
2014	Ariel Pink	pom pom	"Not Enough Violence"	Writer
