= Internet Girl =

Internet Girl or other variations may refer to:

- Internet Girl (internet personality) (born 1995)
- "Internet Girl" (song) by Katseye, 2026
- Internet Girls, novel series by Lauren Myracle, 2005–2014
- "My Internet Girl", a song from Aaron's Party (Come Get It)
