= Witchhunt Suite for WWIII =

Single by Ariel Pink's Haunted Graffiti
- Written: 2001
- Released: September 10, 2011
- Recorded: 2011
- Genre: Pop
- Length: 16:27

Ariel Pink's Haunted Graffiti singles chronology
| "Round and Round" (2011) | "Witchhunt Suite for WWIII" (2011) | "Baby" (2012) |

Music video
- "Witchhunt Suite for WWIII" on YouTube

"Witchhunt Suite for WWIII" is a song by Ariel Pink's Haunted Graffiti, originally released as the final track on the 2007 album Yas Dudette. In 2011, a rerecorded version was released as a standalone digital single to commemorate the tenth anniversary of the September 11 attacks. Pink and Animal Charm directed the song's music video, which features a cameo appearance from R. Stevie Moore.

== Critical reception ==
Pitchfork reviewer Marc Masters awarded the single a 7.8 out of 10, elaborating "It's all pretty fun, both as postmodern patchwork and nostalgia trip. But, at least at first, the only point seems to be the thrill of randomly tossing historically-charged words and images against the wall. ... its length allows Pink to stretch good ideas into better ones, moving from tight jamming to slow keyboard meditations to freaked-out climaxes. Still, you'd hope there'd be more to a 9/11 concept piece than awesome tuneage."
