= Bubblegum Dreams =

Bubblegum Dreams may refer to:

- Bubblegum Dreams, 1997 EP by The Queers
- "Bubblegum Dreams", 2017 song by Ariel Pink from the album Dedicated to Bobby Jameson
