= Before Today (disambiguation) =

Before Today is a 2010 album by Ariel Pink's Haunted Graffiti.

Before Today may also refer to:

- Before Today, predecessor of American band Pierce the Veil
- "Before Today", a song by Everything but the Girl from their 1996 album Walking Wounded
- "Before Today", a song by Lost Frequencies from the 2019 album Alive and Feeling Fine
