= Dedicated to Bobby Jameson =

Studio album by Ariel Pink
- Released: September 15, 2017
- Recorded: 2016
- Genre: Pop; indie rock; hypnagogic pop
- Length: 49:47
- Label: Mexican Summer
- Producer: Ariel Pink

Ariel Pink chronology
| pom pom (2014) | Dedicated to Bobby Jameson (2017) | Odditties Sodomies Vol. 2 (2019) |

Singles from Dedicated to Bobby Jameson
- 1. "Another Weekend" Released: June 21, 2017; 2. "Time to Live" Released: July 11, 2017; 3. "Feels Like Heaven" Released: August 15, 2017

Dedicated to Bobby Jameson is the eleventh studio album by American recording artist Ariel Pink, released on September 15, 2017, through Mexican Summer. It is the follow-up to 2014's pom pom and features a narrative Pink described in a press release as "a battery of tests and milestones, the first of which sees him [the protagonist] reborn into life out of death." It peaked at number 193 on the Billboard 200 and received generally positive reviews from music critics.

The album was named in honor of Bobby Jameson, a 1960s singer-songwriter who retreated from the music industry after a series of misfortunes. In 2007, Jameson resurfaced with an autobiographical blog that alleged wrongdoing on the part of various managers and record company agents, which he maintained until his death in 2015. Pink said that Jameson's "life resonated with me to such a degree that I felt a need to dedicate my latest record to him." Three singles were issued in advance of the album's release: "Another Weekend", "Time to Live", and "Feels Like Heaven".

== Background ==
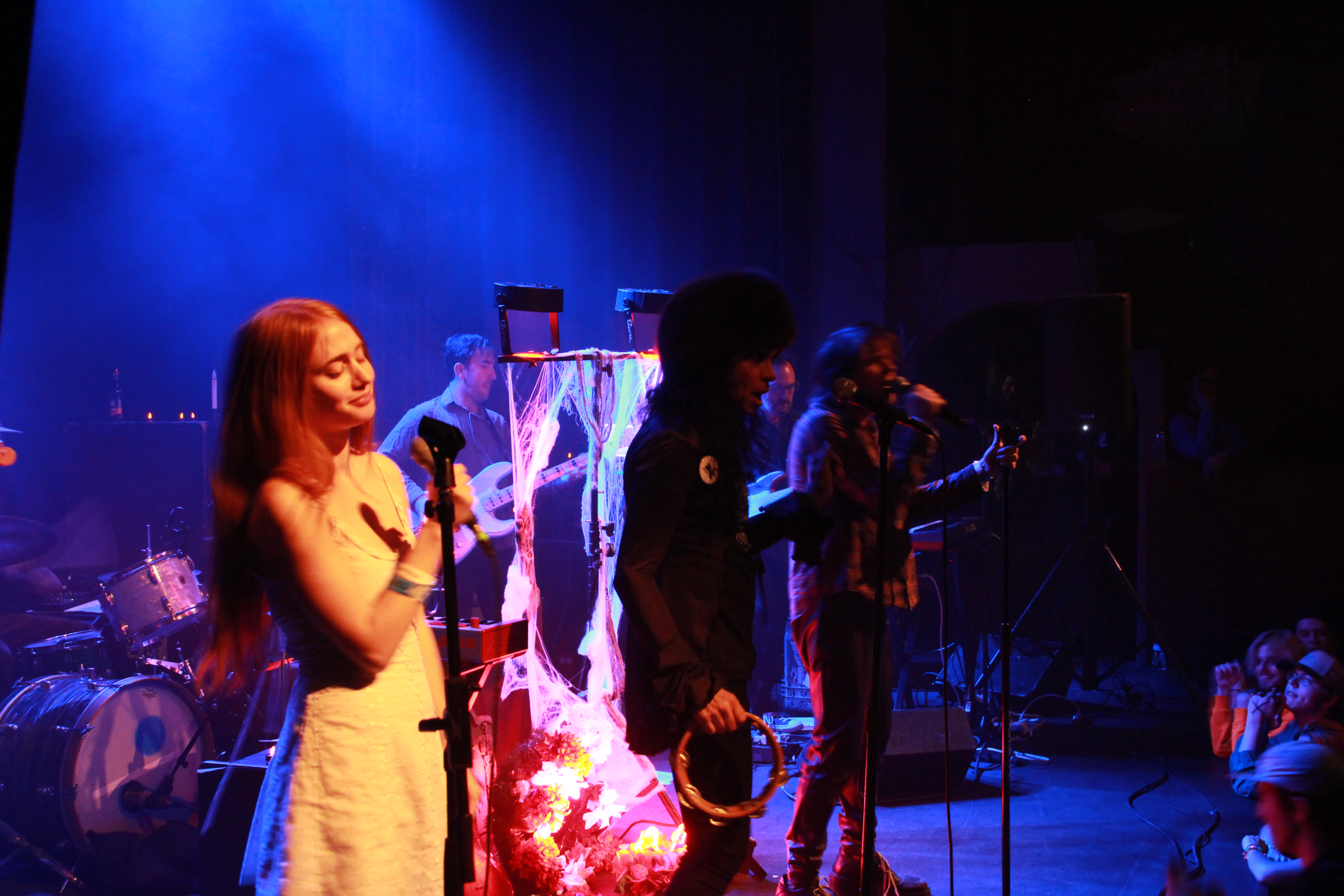
Ariel Pink performing with his touring band in October 2017

The title refers to 1960s singer-songwriter Bobby Jameson, who retreated from the music industry after a series of misfortunes. In 2007, he resurfaced with a blog and YouTube channel that he maintained until his death in 2015. After Jameson died, Pink learned of him through a mutual friend, "and she pointed me to some of his YouTube rantings. That sort of led me to his blog, which is like his unpublished autobiography, and I read that." Pink said that Jameson's "life resonated with me to such a degree that I felt a need to dedicate my latest record to him."

In July 2016, he commenced recording the album at his home with a small group of friends. He said that the work was not intended to have a set theme, and that there was "no reason why I should've named it that way; I came up with the album title before anything else, and I had to have a song that was named that." On the album's apparent 1960s-style music: "It came out that way. It's been that way for as long as I can recall. I'm essentially still playing the same genre of non-genre music as when I started." Its cover art contains visual callbacks to Pink's earlier albums The Doldrums (2000) and Fast Forward (2003), while the title track is a rerecording of "Time Dandelion" with revised lyrics that reference "Tinseltown Tranny". In 2017, early collaborator John Maus happened to return with his first album in five years, Screen Memories, only weeks after Dedicated's release. When asked about perceived connections between Dedicated and Screen Memories, Maus answered that the two records "couldn't have been an influence onto each other at all because he was done before he heard what I was doing, and vice versa."

On June 21, 2017, the album's announcement was accompanied by a video for the seventh track "Another Weekend", directed by Grant Singer. The vinyl edition included the B-side "Ode to the Goat (Thank You)". This was followed with a video for "Feels Like Heaven", uploaded on August 23. In promotional interviews, Pink intimated that his desire for attention and willingness to release albums had declined, and instead talked mostly about Jameson.

== Reception ==
Professional ratings
Aggregate scores
| Source | Rating |
|---|---|
| AnyDecentMusic? | 7.2/10 |
| Metacritic | 79/100 |
Review scores
| Source | Rating |
| AllMusic | 4/5 stars |
| The A.V. Club | B+ |
| The Guardian | 3/5 stars |
| The Irish Times | 5/5 stars |
| The Observer | 4/5 stars |
| Pitchfork | 8.2/10 |
| Q | 3/5 stars |
| Slant Magazine | 4/5 stars |
| The Times | 4/5 stars |
| Uncut | 8/10 |

At Metacritic, which assigns a normalized rating out of 100 to reviews from critics, Dedicated to Bobby Jameson received an average score of 79 based on 16 reviews, indicating "generally favorable reviews". On October 7, it debuted at number 193 on the Billboard 200.

In the four-star review for website AllMusic, Heather Phares concluded that the album "is a weird, catchy, thought-provoking celebration of individuality that offers one Pink's most appealing balances of sugary accessibility and irreverent indulgence." Pitchfork awarded the album "best new music", with critic Sam Sodomsky writing that it is "Pink's most humble, most insular work in years. ... These are among Pink’s simplest, sharpest compositions, sprawling with an intuitive charm. Its sense of ease harkens back to long ago, when Pink’s records mostly served to expand his strange universe with little outside influence." Tiny Mix Tapes' Sam Goldner reviewed that the album "is the closest Pink has come to the smeared quality of his earliest albums ... 'Another Weekend' is one of the most miserable, wilted things Pink has written since 'For Kate I Wait'". Zachary Hoskins was also positive in his appraisal for Slant Magazine, saying "Pink fully embraces his ever-bourgeoning cult status throughout, and with a sense of wild-eyed invention that was sorely absent from the more conventional pom pom".

Writing for The Observer, Damien Morris declared in his four star review that Pink's "songs, like his interviews, often teeter on the unlistenable edge of annoying, but push past the weaponised irony and you’ll find Another Weekend and Feels Like Heaven are his most seductive melodies since breakthrough album Before Today." The Guardian's Hannah Davies opined: "There are some excellent – even tender – moments here but, as per, only true fans will be able to overlook Pink’s exasperating lack of focus."

== Track listing ==
Dedicated to Bobby Jameson
| No. | Title | Writer(s) | Length |
|---|---|---|---|
| 1. | "Time to Meet Your God" | Kenneth Gilmore; Ariel Pink | 2:40 |
| 2. | "Feels Like Heaven" | Pink | 3:16 |
| 3. | "Death Patrol" | Allison Norton; Pink | 3:20 |
| 4. | "Santa's in the Closet" | Pink | 3:01 |
| 5. | "Dedicated to Bobby Jameson" | Pink | 3:50 |
| 6. | "Time to Live" | Pink | 5:43 |
| 7. | "Another Weekend" | Patrik Berger; Måns Lundberg; Pink | 4:14 |
| 8. | "I Wanna Be Young" | Pink | 2:36 |
| 9. | "Bubblegum Dreams" | Jorge Elbrecht; Pink | 3:12 |
| 10. | "Dreamdate Narcissist" | Pink | 2:28 |
| 11. | "Kitchen Witch" | Charlotte Ercoli Coe; Pink | 3:38 |
| 12. | "Do Yourself a Favor" | Michael Collins; Pink | 3:40 |
| 13. | "Acting" (featuring Dâm-Funk; on CD editions, the hidden track “Ode to the Goat” (2:41) starts after a minute of silence on track 13, which ends at 4:32) | Pink; Damon Riddick | 8:09 |
| Total length: | | | 49:47 |

Digital bonus track
| No. | Title | Length |
|---|---|---|
| 14. | "Revenge of the Iceman" | 3:25 |

Deluxe LP bonus 12" (Non-Sequitur Segues)
| No. | Title | Length |
|---|---|---|
| 1. | "Nighttime Is Great!" | 4:01 |
| 2. | "Lil' Birdie Told Me" | 2:41 |
| 3. | "Non-Sequitur Segues" | 2:45 |
| 4. | "May the Music Never Die Again" | 3:51 |

== Personnel ==
Adapted from AllMusic.

- Ariel Pink – art direction, design, mixing, producer
- Juliette Amoroso – engineer
- Robert Beatty – art direction, design
- Patrik Berger – mixing
- Charlotte Ercoli Coe – photography
- Jillian Alexander – cover photography
- Dave Cooley – mastering
- Kenny Gilmore – engineer, mixing
- Alle Norton – engineer

== Charts ==
| Chart (2017) | Peak position |
|---|---|
| Belgian Albums (Ultratop Flanders) | 181 |
| Scottish Albums (OCC) | 85 |
| US Billboard 200 | 193 |
