= Mature Themes =

Studio album by Ariel Pink's Haunted Graffiti
- Released: August 20, 2012
- Length: 48:15
- Label: 4AD

Ariel Pink's Haunted Graffiti chronology
| Before Today (2010) | Mature Themes (2012) | Early Live Recordings (2013) |

Singles from Mature Themes
- 1. "Baby" Released: July 9, 2012

Professional ratings
Aggregate scores
| Source | Rating |
|---|---|
| AnyDecentMusic? | 6.8/10 |
| Metacritic | 74/100 |
Review scores
| Source | Rating |
| AllMusic | 4/5 stars |
| The A.V. Club | A− |
| The Guardian | 4/5 stars |
| Los Angeles Times | 3.5/4 stars |
| MSN Music (Expert Witness) | A− |
| NME | 7/10 |
| Pitchfork | 8.5/10 |
| Q | 3/5 stars |
| Rolling Stone | 3.5/5 stars |
| Spin | 8/10 |

Mature Themes is the ninth studio album by the American recording artist Ariel Pink. It was released on August 20, 2012, through 4AD, and is the second album recorded with Pink's band. It is the final album released under Pink's musical project "Haunted Graffiti," as he would subsequently release material under his name starting with his follow-up album, pom pom (2014).

The album was recognized as one of "The 100 Best Albums of the Decade So Far", a list published by Pitchfork in August 2014.

== Promotion and singles ==
The lead single is a cover of the Donnie and Joe Emerson song "Baby". The song was met with positive reception from the music press, and was deemed "Best New Track" by Pitchfork. On July 9, "Only in My Dreams" was released as the second single.

The band announced a European tour in November–December 2012.

== Track listing ==
"Early Birds of Babylon" features Weyes Blood.

| No. | Title | Length |
|---|---|---|
| 1. | "Kinski Assassin" | 2:59 |
| 2. | "Is This the Best Spot?" | 1:47 |
| 3. | "Mature Themes" | 2:47 |
| 4. | "Only in My Dreams" | 3:12 |
| 5. | "Driftwood" | 4:22 |
| 6. | "Early Birds of Babylon" | 5:15 |
| 7. | "Schnitzel Boogie" | 4:35 |
| 8. | "Symphony of the Nymph" | 4:35 |
| 9. | "Pink Slime" | 2:11 |
| 10. | "Farewell American Primitive" | 2:55 |
| 11. | "Live It Up" | 4:03 |
| 12. | "Nostradamus & Me" | 7:25 |
| 13. | "Baby" (featuring Dâm-Funk) | 4:49 |
| Total length: | | 48:15 |

Japanese Bonus Track
| No. | Title | Length |
|---|---|---|
| 1. | "Love Everyone" | 04:58 |
| Total length: | | 04:58 |
