= Scared Famous and Fast Forward =

2001 studio albums by Ariel Pink

Scared Famous

Studio album by Ariel Pink's Haunted Graffiti
- Released: 2001
- Recorded: September 2000 – July 2001
- Length: 75:09

Ariel Pink's Haunted Graffiti chronology
The Doldrums (2000)	Scared Famous (2001)	Fast Forward (2001)

Fast Forward

Studio album by Ariel Pink's Haunted Graffiti
- Released: 2001
- Recorded: October 2000 – July 2001
- Length: 66:53

Ariel Pink's Haunted Graffiti chronology
Scared Famous (2001)	Fast Forward (2001)	House Arrest (2002)

Scared Famous and Fast Forward are the third and fourth albums by American recording artist Ariel Pink (credited as "Ariel Pink's Haunted Graffiti"). They were originally released on cassette as a double album by Ariel in 2001. A compilation album of the material from both albums was subsequently released by Human Ear Music in 2007. It consisted of only 17 tracks selected from the original cassettes.

Some of the tracks from the original Scared Famous / Fast Forward release later appeared on the 2008 compilation Odditties Sodomies Vol. 1, and select tracks from were rerecorded for Pink's later albums; "Beverly Kills" on Before Today (2010) and "I Wanna Be Young" on Dedicated to Bobby Jameson (2017).

In 2021, the albums were reissued by Mexican Summer as one unified release with improved sound quality.

== Critical reception ==
Professional ratings
Review scores
Source	Rating
Pitchfork	6.6/10 (2007 reissue)

Reviewing the 2007 Scared Famous compilation, Pitchfork contributor Andrew Gaerig wrote that it combined "random brilliance with sonic bullshit." He concluded, "The willfully negligent production and arrangement [from The Doldrums] remains, but viewed as a transition between his very early work and the slight improvements he'd made by House Arrest, they're nearly permissible."

== Track listing ==
=== Original release ===
All tracks are written by Ariel Pink, except where noted.

Scared Famous
No.	Title	Length
1.	"Baby Comes Around"	2:44
2.	"The Facts of Destiny" (The Centimeters)	3:10
3.	"Privacy"	3:10
4.	"Passing the Petal to You"	2:55
5.	"Beverly Kills (Freaks with Golden Heirs)"	3:56
6.	"Why Can't I Be Me?"	3:28
7.	"Something Isn't Something"	3:42
8.	"Express, Confess, Cover-Up" (R. Stevie Moore, Pink)	7:27
9.	"Birds in My Tree" (Mark Weitz, Ed King; arranged by R. Stevie Moore)	3:29
10.	"Shedon'tknowwhattodowithherself" (Moore)	2:42
11.	"Moya" (Southern Death Cult)	4:40
12.	"SteviePink" (Moore, Pink)	5:59
13.	"R. Stevie's Brain"	3:09
14.	"Spiers in the Snow"	2:02
15.	"I Wanna Be Young"	2:37
16.	"Gopacapulco"	2:51
17.	"Hoist Interlude"	0:21
18.	"Scared Famous"	5:17
19.	"Deathcrush 99"	10:33
Total length:		75:09

Fast Forward
No.	Title	Length
1.	"Intro/Where Does the Mind Go" (Moore, Pink)	4:14
2.	"Twenty Two Eyes"	1:53
3.	"Are You Gonna Look After My Boys?"	2:23
4.	"Inmates of Heartache"	2:54
5.	"Make Room for Harry"	4:28
6.	"The List (My Favorite Song)"	5:25
7.	"My Molly"	2:16
8.	"Howling at the Moon" (Moore, Pink)	3:49
9.	"Beefbud"	1:57
10.	"A Tomb All Your Own"	7:24
11.	"Victor"	0:34
12.	"The Kitchen Club" (Moore, Pink)	5:41
13.	"The Lament of Edward Boggles"	2:24
14.	"Crying"	2:21
15.	"Talking All the Time"	2:47
16.	"Girl in a Tree"	3:17
17.	"Jesus Christ Came to Me in a Dream"	5:31
18.	"One More Time"	4:38
19.	"May the Music Never Die"	2:55
Total length:		66:53

=== 2007 – Human Ear Music reissue ===
Scared Famous
No.	Title	Length
1.	"Gopacapulco"	2:51
2.	"Howling At The Moon" (Moore, Pink)	3:43
3.	"Are You Gonna Look After My Boys?"	2:21
4.	"Beefbud"	1:52
5.	"Baby Comes Around"	2:31
6.	"Talking All The Time"	2:34
7.	"Politely Declined"	3:22
8.	"Scared Famous"	5:11
9.	"Why Can't I Be Me?"	3:25
10.	"Girl In A Tree"	3:19
11.	"The Kitchen Club" (Moore, Pink)	5:32
12.	"Passing The Petal 2 You"	2:53
13.	"Inmates Of Heartache"	3:30
14.	"In A Tomb All Your Own"	7:10
15.	"Jesus Christ Came To Me In A Dream"	5:39
16.	"The List (My Favorite Song)"	5:42
17.	"An Appeal From Heaven"	2:12

=== 2021 – Mexican Summer reissue ===
Scared Famous/FF»
No.	Title	Length
1.	"Intro / Where Does the Mind Go?""	2:59
2.	"Politely Declined"
3.	"The Kitchen Club" (Moore, Pink)	5:39
4.	"Are You Gonna Look After My Boys?"	2:21
5.	"Beverly Kills"
6.	"Girl in a Tree"
7.	"Why Can't I Be Me?"
8.	"Talking All the Time"
9.	"Passing the Petal to You"
10.	"Beef Bud"
11.	"Privacy"
12.	"22 Eyes"
13.	"Scared Famous"
14.	"The Lament of Edward Boggles"
15.	"Baby Comes Around"
16.	"Jesus Christ Came to Me in a Dream"
17.	"Birds in My Tree"
18.	"An Appeal from Heaven"
19.	"Inmates of Heartache"
20.	"The List"
21.	"May the Music Never Die"
22.	"Howling At The Moon" (Moore, Pink)	3:45
23.	"In a Tomb All Your Own"
24.	"Deathcrush 99"
25.	"Gopacapulco"

== Credits ==
Scared Famous

- Ariel Pink – all vocals and instruments, except:
- R. Stevie Moore – strings and bass on "Express, Confess, Cover-Up"
- Jim Price Skeletons – drums on "Express, Confess, Cover-Up"
- Recorded between September 2000 and July 2001 at 1245 Norton St., Los Angeles, except "Express, Confess, Cover-Up": recorded in Nashville.

Fast Forward

- Ariel Pink – all vocals and instruments
- Recorded between October 2000 and July 2001
