= Early Live Recordings =

Compilation live album by Ariel Pink

Compilation album / live album by Ariel Pink
- Released: December 17, 2013
- Recorded: Late 1990s–early 2000s
- Label: Human Ear Music

Ariel Pink chronology
Mature Themes (2012)	Early Live Recordings (2013)	pom pom (2014)

Early Live Recordings is a compilation album by American singer-songwriter and musician Ariel Pink. It was released on December 17, 2013, through Human Ear Music record label. The album features Pink's early live recordings in the late 1990s and early 2000s under the aliases "Gorilla" and "Appleasians".

The tracks were saved from the same series CD-R and eight-track cassettes that spawned Thrash & Burn, Ariel Pink's previously unreleased late-1990s musique concrète album that was released in 2006 and reissued in 2012. The compilation also features a cover of the Shaggs song, "My Cutie".

== Critical reception ==
Professional ratings
Review scores
Source	Rating
Pitchfork	4.4/10

Allmusic critic Heather Phares gave the album a positive review, stating: "Coupled with Thrash & Burn, Early Live Recordings delivers an entertainingly fleshed-out portrait of Pink's pre-Haunted Graffiti years." Andy Beta of Pitchfork was mixed in his assessment of the album, writing: "While excavating the eight Haunted Graffiti albums revealed repulsive and alluring sounds in equal measure, Early Live Recordings' only real crime is that little of it fascinates."

== Track listing ==
Gorilla

1. "Berzerker"
2. "Logan's Run"
3. "Chunga"
4. "El Fantastic Summer, Pt. 1"
5. "Lila Lay"
6. "Die He Die"
7. "I'm Burning Up"
8. "Why Am I So Sad"
9. "Nazi Love"
10. "Darby's Revenge"
11. "Not Her Home Yet"
12. "I Sold My Soul"
13. "Dancing In the Darkness"
14. "Zip Drive"
15. "By the Powers of Grayskull"
16. "Damo's CD"
17. "Funeral In an Aircraft"
18. "Farewell Goodbye"

Appleasians

1. "Tractor Man"
2. "Inside Looking Out"
3. "Something In Your Eye"
4. "Nana"
5. "Crusades"
6. "Don't Turn Back"
7. "Who Has Scene the Ween"
8. "Nana Reprise"
9. "My Cutie" (The Shaggs cover)
10. "I Lied To Her"
11. "Shelly Come Out Tonite"
12. "Don't Turn Back"
13. "In the Dungeon"
14. "Inside Looking Out"
15. "The Appleasians"
16. "Art Life"
17. "Red Scare"
18. "2008"
