= House Arrest (album) =

Studio album by Ariel Pink's Haunted Graffiti
- Released: September 2002
- Recorded: October 1, 2001 – July 2, 2002
- Genre: Hypnagogic pop
- Length: 65:39
- Label: Demonstration Bootleg

Ariel Pink's Haunted Graffiti chronology
Scared Famous/FF» (2001)	House Arrest (2002)	Lover Boy (2003)

Professional ratings
Review scores
Source	Rating
AllMusic	4/5 stars
Pitchfork	6.2/10
The A.V. Club	A−

House Arrest is the fifth studio album by American recording artist Ariel Pink, under Pink's "Haunted Graffiti" musical project. It is the fifth album in the eponymous series of albums, as subtitled. It was self-released in September 2002 under the imprint, Demonstration Bootleg, as a double CD set with his follow-up album, Lover Boy.

On January 24, 2006, the album was reissued by Paw Tracks and Ballbearings Pinatas.

== Track listing ==
1. "Hardcore Pops Are Fun"
2. "Interesting Results"
3. "West Coast Calamities"
4. "Flying Circles"
5. "Gettin' High in the Morning"
6. "Helen"
7. "Every Night I Die at Miyagis"
8. "House Arrest"
9. "Alisa"
10. "The People I'm Not"
11. "Almost Waiting"
12. "Oceans of Weep"
13. "Netherlands"
14. "Higher and Higher"

coL Drums on "Interesting Results"

All songs written, performed and recorded by Ariel Pink at 1245 Norton ave. Los Angeles California Oct. 01 - July 2 on MT8X Yamaha 8 Track cassette.
