= Worn Copy =

Studio album by Ariel Pink's Haunted Graffiti
- Released: 2003
- Recorded: September 2002 – February 2003
- Length: 76:19
- Label: Rhystop

Ariel Pink's Haunted Graffiti chronology
Lover Boy (2002)	Worn Copy (2003)	Before Today (2010)

Worn Copy is the seventh studio album by the American recording artist Ariel Pink, under his "Haunted Graffiti" musical project. It is the eighth release in the eponymous series of works and was released on the label, Rhystop, in 2003. It was reissued by Paw Tracks in 2005 with the bonus video, "For Kate I Wait."

Professional ratings
Review scores
Source	Rating
AllMusic	4/5 stars
Pitchfork	5.9/10
PopMatters	7/10

== Track listing ==
No.	Title	Length
1.	"Trepanated Earth": "Trepan Overature"; "Heaven's Hotter Than Hell"; "Trepan Reprise""	10:53
2.	"Immune to Emotion"	2:39
3.	"Jules Lost His Jewels"	3:50
4.	"Artifact"	4:48
5.	"Bloody! (Bagonia's)"	1:32
6.	"Credit"	3:25
7.	"Life in L.A."	6:45
8.	"The Drummer"	4:54
9.	"Cable Access Follies"	2:13
10.	"Creepshow"	5:22
11.	"One on One"	3:08
12.	"Oblivious Peninsula"	4:20
13.	"Somewhere in Europe/Hotpink!"	4:29
14.	"Thespian City"	3:08
15.	"Crybaby"	3:25
16.	"Foilly Foibles/GOLD"	8:09
17.	"Jagged Carnival Tours"	3:11
Total length:		76:19
