= Round and Round (Ariel Pink's Haunted Graffiti song) =

Single by Ariel Pink's Haunted Graffiti

from the album Before Today
- A-side: "Mistaken Wedding"
- Released: April 26, 2010
- Genre: Soft rock; downtempo pop; disco
- Length: 5:13
- Label: 4AD
- Songwriter: Ariel Pink's Haunted Graffiti

Audio sample
- file; help

"Round and Round" is a song written and performed by the American hypnagogic pop band Ariel Pink's Haunted Graffiti. It was released as a double A-side on April 26, 2010 and appeared as the fifth track on Before Today, the band's debut album on 4AD.

Guitarist Cole M. Greif-Neill recalled of the track's creation: "[It] was like two songs in one. We wrote new parts and rearranged it in a total ramshackle way into a very-not-cohesive song." The Atlantic's Llewellyn Hinkes-Jones described the song's styles ranging "from King Sunny Ade afropop to Holland-era Beach Boys with elements of musique concrete dropped in here and there."

Pitchfork ranked the track at number one on "The Top 100 Tracks of 2010" and number two on "The 200 Best Tracks of the Decade So Far (2010-2014)".

== Track listing ==
No.	Title	Length
1.	"Round and Round"	5:13
2.	"Mistaken Wedding"	4:02
Total length:		9:15
