= Lover Boy (album) =

Studio album by Ariel Pink's Haunted Graffiti
- Released: 2002 (original); March 2006 (re-issue)
- Recorded: 2001–2002
- Genre: Psychedelic pop; lo-fi
- Label: Ballbearings Pinatas; CD Baby
- Producer: Ariel Pink

Ariel Pink's Haunted Graffiti chronology
House Arrest (2002)	Lover Boy (2002)	Worn Copy (2003)

Lover Boy is the sixth studio album by the American recording artist Ariel Pink, under the artist's "Haunted Graffiti" musical project. It is the sixth release in the eponymous series of works.

The album was originally released in 2002 through Ballbearings Pinatas and CD Baby as part of a double-CD set with his previous release, House Arrest. In March 2006, the album was reissued as a single album on CD-R. The reissue includes a slightly different set of tracks from the original album, cutting the songs "Credit" and "One on One" from the line-up and adding the live song "You Are My Angel".

== Track listing ==
1. "Don't Talk To Strangers"
2. "Didn't It Click?"
3. "She's My Girl"
4. "Poultry Head"
5. "Older Than Her Years"
6. "So Glad"
7. "Want Me"
8. "Loverboy" with John Maus
9. "Jonathan's Halo"
10. "Hobbies Galore" by R. Stevie Moore
11. "I Don't Need Enemies (Holy Shit Single 45)" with Matt Fishbeck
12. "Let's Get Married Tonite"
13. "Ghosts" with John Maus
14. "Phoebus Palast" with coL
15. "Blue Straws" with Brandt Larson
16. "The Birds They Sing In You" with coL
17. "New Trumpets Of Time" with coL
18. "Doggone (shegone)"
19. "You Are My Angel (Live)"

== Personnel ==
coL played drums on "Poultry Head", drum programming, guitars, vocals on "New Trumpets Of Time".

On "New Trumpets of Time", Pink only played bass and synthesizers on the track. The song was originally created with coL for his album, but because coL took a long time to compile this album; Pink really thought the track should be heard, and he placed it on his record.
