= Ariel Pink =

American musician, singer, and songwriter (born 1978)

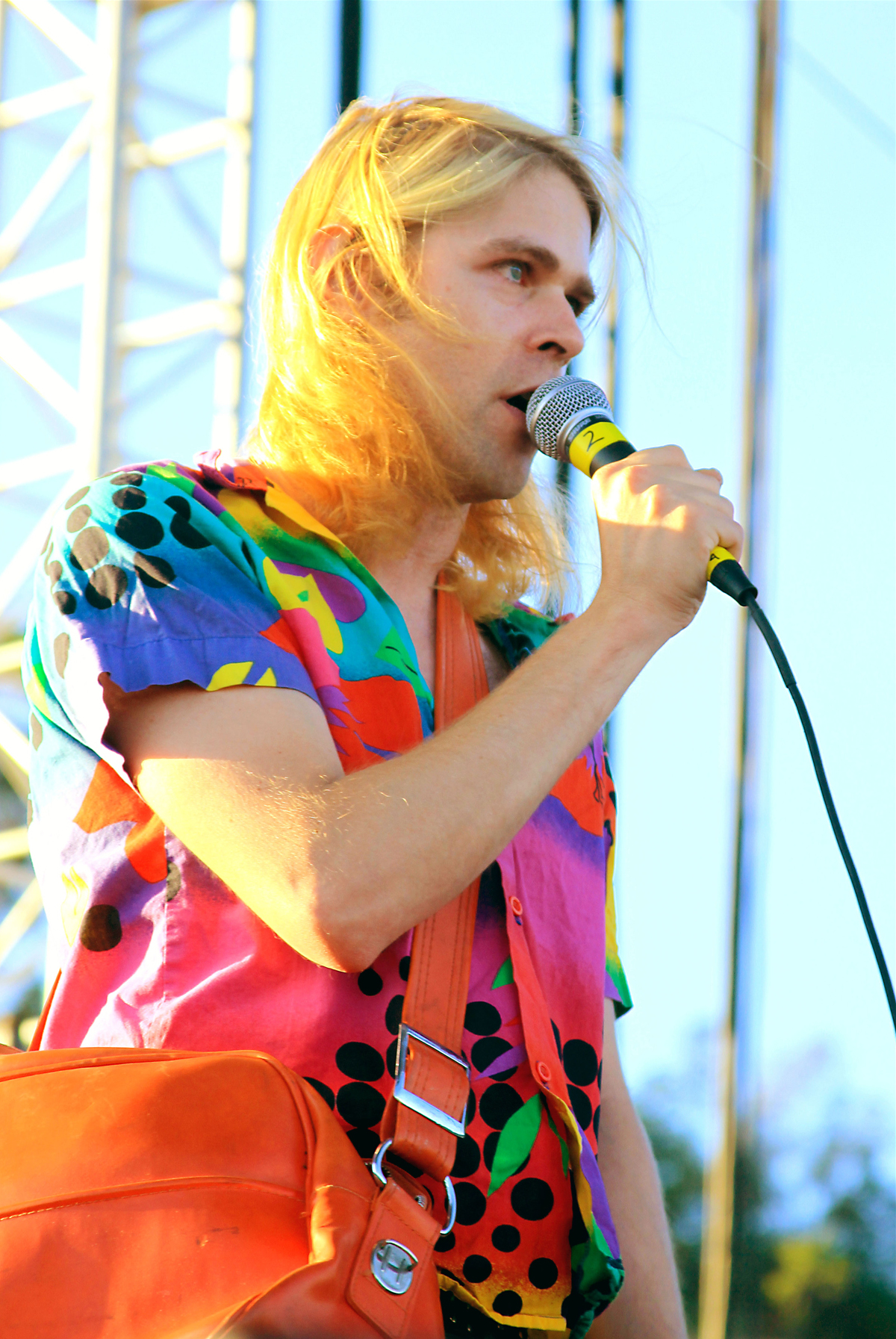
- Ariel Pink performing in 2010

Background information
- Born: Ariel Marcus Rosenberg; June 24, 1978 (age 48); Los Angeles, California, U.S.
- Genres: Lo-fi; hypnagogic pop; rock
- Occupations: Musician; songwriter; singer; producer
- Instruments: Vocals; guitar; bass; keyboards; beatboxing
- Years active: 1996–present
- Labels: Paw Tracks; Mexican Summer; 4AD; Dark Side Family Jams; AjA Records
- Formerly of: Holy Shit
- Website: arielxpink.com

Ariel Marcus Rosenberg (/ˈɑːriɛl/ AR-ee-el; born June 24, 1978), professionally known as Ariel Pink, is an American musician, singer, and songwriter whose work draws heavily from the popular music of the 1960s–1980s. His lo-fi aesthetic and home-recorded albums proved influential to many indie musicians starting in the late 2000s. He is frequently cited as the "godfather" of the hypnagogic pop and chillwave movements, and he is credited with galvanizing a larger trend involving the evocation of the media, sounds, and outmoded technologies of prior decades, as well as an equal appreciation between high and low art in independent music.

A native of Los Angeles, Pink began experimenting with recording songs on an eight-track Portastudio as a teenager. His early influences were artists such as Michael Jackson, the Cure, and R. Stevie Moore. The majority of his recorded output stems from a prolific eight-year period (1996–2003) in which he accumulated over 200 cassette tapes of material. Virtually all of his music released in the 2000s was written and recorded before 2004, the same year he debuted on Animal Collective's Paw Tracks label with The Doldrums (2000), House Arrest (2002) and Worn Copy (2003). The albums immediately attracted a cult following.

In the 2000s, Pink's unusual sound prompted a renewed critical discussion of hauntological phenomena, for which he was a central figure. Until 2014, his records were usually credited to Ariel Pink's Haunted Graffiti, a solo project sometimes conflated with his touring band. His fame and recognition escalated following his signing to 4AD and the success of his 2010 album Before Today, his first recorded in a professional studio. He then recorded three more albums – Mature Themes (2012), Pom Pom (2014), and Dedicated to Bobby Jameson (2017) – the last of which was recorded for Mexican Summer.

Throughout his career, Pink has been subject to several media controversies stemming from his occasional provocations onstage and in interviews. In 2021, he lost support from Mexican Summer following his presence in Washington, D.C., during the January 6 Capitol attack. He then formed a new band, Ariel Pink's Dark Side, with whom he recorded two albums, The Key of Joy Is Disobedience (2022) and Never Made A Demo, Ever (2023).

== Early life ==
Ariel Marcus Rosenberg was born in Los Angeles on June 24, 1978. He is the only son of Mario Z. Rosenberg and Linda Rosenberg-Kennett. Mario is a Harvard-educated gastroenterologist born to a Jewish family in Mexico City, while Linda is from New Orleans. They moved to Los Angeles after Mario completed his medical specialty work at Tulane University hospital in New Orleans. (Note: He is the "Dr. Mario" referenced in the lyric of Pink's song "Symphony of the Nymph".) Ariel's first language was Spanish. Although his family is Jewish, with his mother having converted, he himself is not practicing. Mario and Linda divorced when Ariel was two years old.

Ariel's parents encouraged him to pursue a career in visual arts rather than music. He said that "with music I had no discernible skills", whereas with drawing, they reportedly thought he was "going to be the next Picasso, and I believed them and I got better." According to Linda, she wanted him to pursue a career in acting: "Acting coaches would come to me and say, 'He's the only kid in that age group who can speak to a girl." He characterized himself as "maladjusted" as a child. Linda commented that he was "a very difficult guy to understand, except for the fact that his heart is pure. [...] He'd rather be left alone. That's how he always was — even as a kid, he played much better by himself."

I wanted to live in another era and be forever 21, like in the gatefold photos of old albums. I loved how I could just enter this world. I totally fetishized it.

— Ariel Rosenberg, 2012

When he was young, Rosenberg was an avid record collector and reader of music magazines, he said, and "had a gross hunger for bootlegs and unofficial rare recordings by artists I worshiped; ate them all up and adopted certain criteria for what I longed for in music." He was first drawn to music through watching MTV. When his interest intensified, he was particularly fond of Michael Jackson, and after entering junior high school, expanded his tastes to metal, including bands like Def Leppard, Metallica, and Anthrax. He then developed a taste for "death rock" groups such as Bauhaus and the Cure, the latter being his favorite band of all time. Another artist he was particularly fond of was Lou Reed. He enjoyed the writings of rock critic Nick Kent and read Richie Unterberger's Unknown Legends of Rock 'n' Roll: Psychedelic Unknowns, Mad Geniuses, Punk Pioneers, Lo-Fi Mavericks & More (1998); later he recorded a cover version of one of the tracks included in a CD that came with the book ("Bright Lit Blue Skies").

Rosenberg was initially raised in Louisiana. He chose to live there with his mother following child custody proceedings. They lived in Pico-Robertson, and later, Bogalusa. Due to the bullying he received in junior high school, his parents sent him to live with his cousins in Mexico City for a year. There, he lost his virginity at age 13, to a prostitute named Sara, and discovered the Cure, a band he thought espoused "something unholy [...] something alive and dead at the same time." He then returned to live with his father in the Beverlywood area of Los Angeles, where he attended Beverly Hills High School, branded himself as a goth, sold off his collection of metal records, and stopped following new music. He cited Nirvana as the last group he enjoyed before this point. In his view, grunge and alternative rock bands marked the end of the forward progress of popular music. "After that, my listening was totally retro. My mind was closing itself off from the rest of the planet."

== Musical career ==
[I started writing songs at around] age 10. I used to write the lyrics down, but I'd have the songs arranged in my head. I didn't learn how to realize what I heard until years later. It's been a very slow process.

— Ariel Rosenberg, 2006

=== 1996–2003: Early recordings ===
While in high school, Rosenberg began experimenting with songwriting and composing avant-garde pieces using a portable cassette recorder in his father's garage. His tools were limited to one bass guitar, an amp, and kitchen utensils. In 1996, he started what he later described as an eight-year-long "recording session" in which he "was very completely single-minded. I had tunnel vision. I was just completely [recording music] like if my life depended on it." By then, he "was very into" krautrock, and in his songs, he endeavored to obfuscate his personality while using photos that bore minimal resemblance to him as album covers. He credited his tapes to a variety of names (or "logos") including "Ariel Pink's Haunted Graffiti" and "Ariel Rosenberg's Thrash and Burn". He did not intend to release any of this music.

In 1997, Rosenberg entered the California Institute of the Arts studying fine art. He was dissatisfied that the school focused on "the art market" rather than "color theory or anything like that". He met John Maus at CalArts, and they subsequently became best friends and roommates. On one project, Rosenberg collaborated with fellow student and roommate Jeremy Albert Ringermacher, submitting a three-foot tall illustration, titled "The Last Art Piece", that realistically depicted the school's faculty, staff members, and students engaging in an orgy. The piece was allowed to be displayed, and in response, an administrative member unsuccessfully sued the university for sexual harassment.

"Among Dreams" from The Doldrums (2000)
Most of Rosenberg's early albums were recorded alone in his home with an eight-track Portastudio. The drum sounds were simulated using mouth noises.

His album The Doldrums (2000) was recorded during his final semester at the university. According to LA Weekly, he was then "in the throes of a drug binge". "I'm sure those were my words," he later said. "I don't know. It was fine. I had a typical art school experience, I suppose, if you consider getting drunk at openings, partying with your 'teachers,' and shrugging off scholastic duties as often as possible as something typical of college experience." He described the album as "the saddest record I could [have made]; it was negative not only emotionally but aesthetically." The guitar parts were played with only three strings. For final examinations, he submitted a kiosk where he sold CDs of The Doldrums as a criticism against the school's marketing-oriented curriculum.

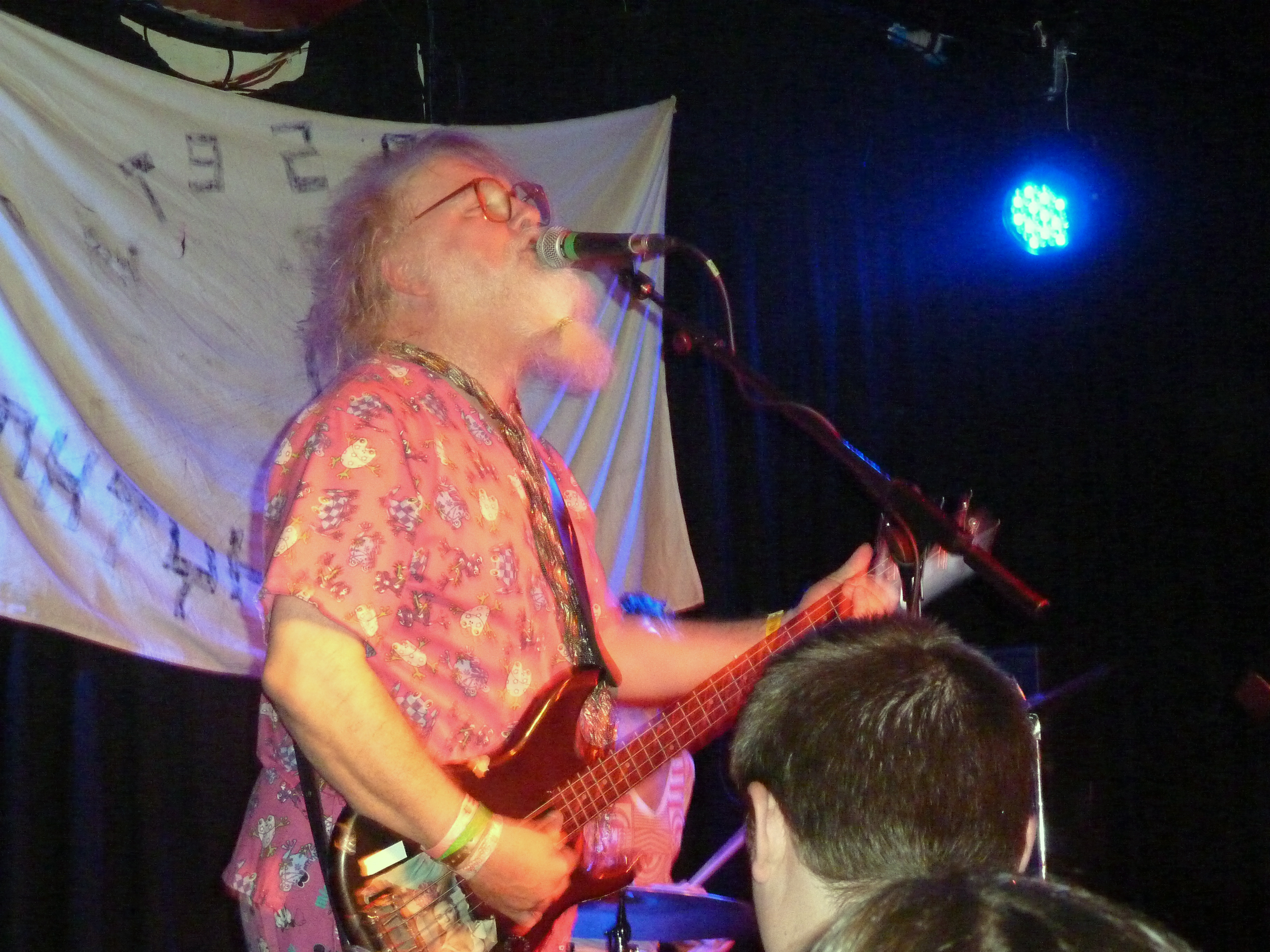
R. Stevie Moore (pictured 2011) is cited by Pink as a "mentor"

Rosenberg became a devout fan of the lo-fi musician R. Stevie Moore after listening to the compilation Everything and subsequently began collaborating with him. He first contacted Moore in early 1999 and mailed him a CD-R of The Doldrums. As Moore remembered, "I often received demos from taper nerds, but the Haunteds were from a surreal plane. Ariel started sending me so much material that it eventually became a big blur; I couldn't even totally wrap my head around his dozens of masterpieces." Pink recalled: "Signing on and seeing that my first email was from him was the most exciting thing to have happened in my life up to that point."

After dropping out of CalArts, Rosenberg lived in a Hindu ashram in Crenshaw, Los Angeles, where he "brought in heroin, smoked so much pot, blasted music, lived in filth, brought all these fucking weirdos in, played and recorded music all night, and never had a problem with those people." He also attended a music school and worked as a clerk at a record store. During this period, he recorded Scared Famous (2001), Fast Forward (2001), House Arrest (2002), Lover Boy (2002), and portions of Worn Copy (2003). He envisioned working at a record store "for the rest of my life" before the Strokes "came out and all the sudden guitars came back [on the charts]. And then the White Stripes came out and I was like, 'Oh, shit.' I wasn't into any of that stuff, but I was like, 'Holy shit...Like in this lifetime...this is happening.'"

By the mid-2000s, Rosenberg had accumulated between 200 and 300 cassette tapes of material. In February 2004, his 16-year-old half-sister Elana suffered permanent brain damage and lost the use of her motor functions due to injuries sustained in a car accident. Asked in a 2012 interview how the experience affected him, he answered, "I have a hard time making music anymore. [...] I listen to what I made ten years ago and it's like hearing a different person. I have no access to those impulses anymore." He stopped writing and recording music for the next several years.

=== 2004–2009: Paw Tracks albums and touring ===
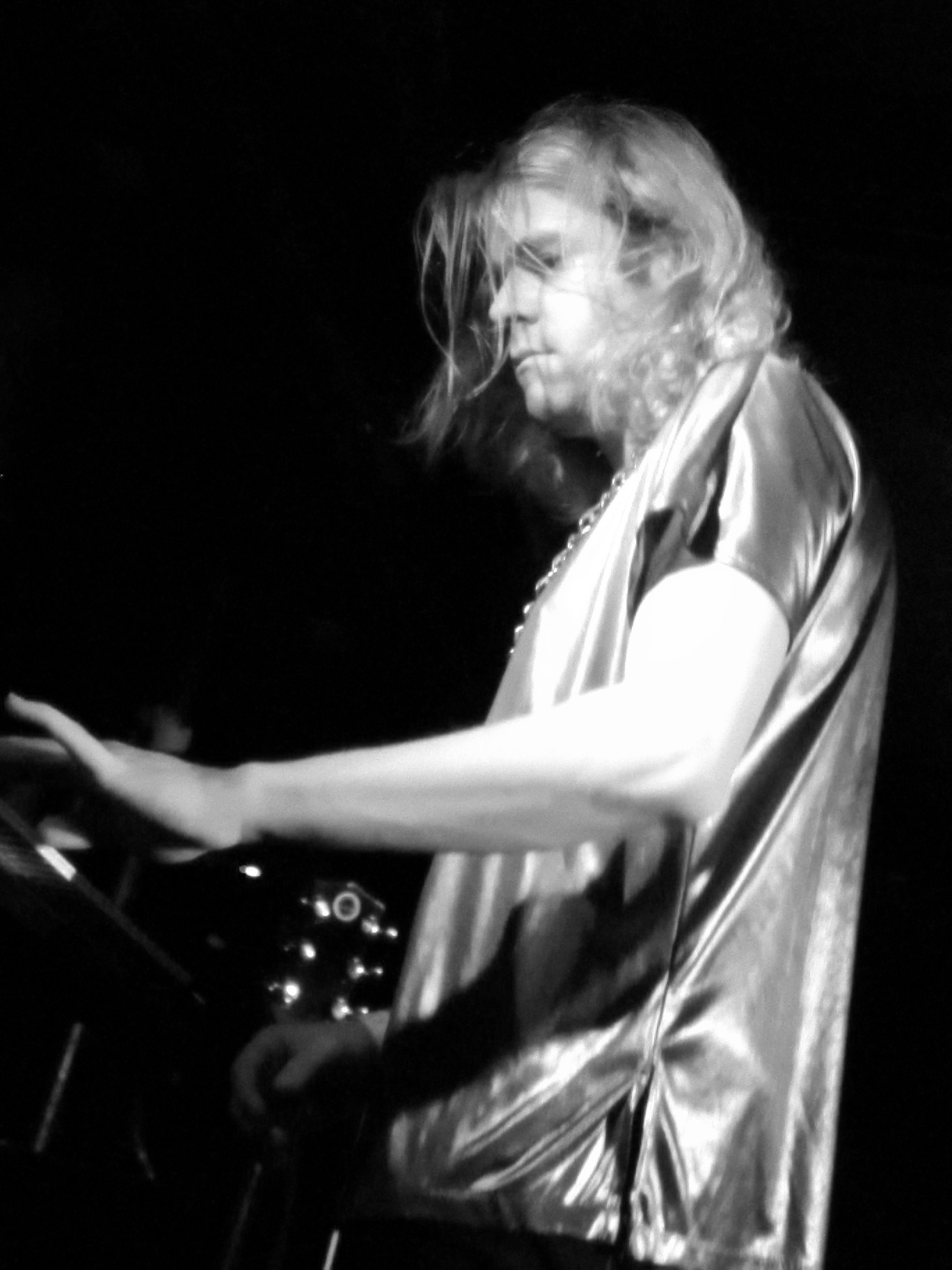
Pink on keyboards, 2010

In the summer of 2003, Rosenberg gave a CD-R of Worn Copy to the band Animal Collective after being introduced at one of their shows by a mutual friend, Beachwood Sparks drummer Jimi Hey. Unbeknownst to Rosenberg, Animal Collective had recently started their own record label, Paw Tracks. The band says in the reissued album's liner notes that it "sat on the floor of the van for a week or so [...] One day, we noticed it and randomly threw it on and were immediately blown away. It was just like 'Woah, what is this!? We knew it could have only been made by this individual, and so made it our goal to officially release his records on our new label." Several weeks later they contacted him to sign him on Paw Tracks. Rather than Worn Copy, Rosenberg submitted what he believed to be his album with the least commercial potential, The Doldrums. The group initially rejected the album, but eventually warmed to it, and accepted it for release.

October 2004's Paw Tracks release of The Doldrums was the first non-Animal Collective record the label issued and the first time his limited-edition home recordings were widely distributed. Only a small circle of his friends and family had heard his music before this point. Afterward, Pink's profile increased substantially. (Note: In a review for Uncut, David Stubbs awarded the album a perfect score and wrote: "Tracks like 'Among Dreams', on which Ariel sounds like he's swimming in his own brain, shouldn't work––so rambling, so amateurish. Yet somehow they have a way of lapsing perfectly into misshape so that you can't take your ears off them." Pitchfork's Nick Sylvester was less impressed and noted a "burgeoning cult of personality" around Pink's "supposed appeal of [...] normal songs, except a 'crazy' guy is singing them, and he has 'crazy' lo-fi production.") He embarked on concert tours to promote the releases. His original live performances (which amounted to local gigs in Los Angeles) consisted of himself singing over prerecorded tracks karaoke-style. When he became the opening act for Animal Collective in 2004, he decided to form a band. His performances were not well-received ("People boo me everywhere. They don't even hide their contempt"). He attributed that to his "not being [a] very good" musician and to his recordings' not being meant to be performed live. "The dudes in my band don't get paid, so I can't really crack the whip and make them learn the songs. They just came along so they could travel." In 2005 and 2006, Paw Tracks reissued two of his previous recordings, Worn Copy and House Arrest, respectively. Altogether, the albums attracted a cult following for Pink.

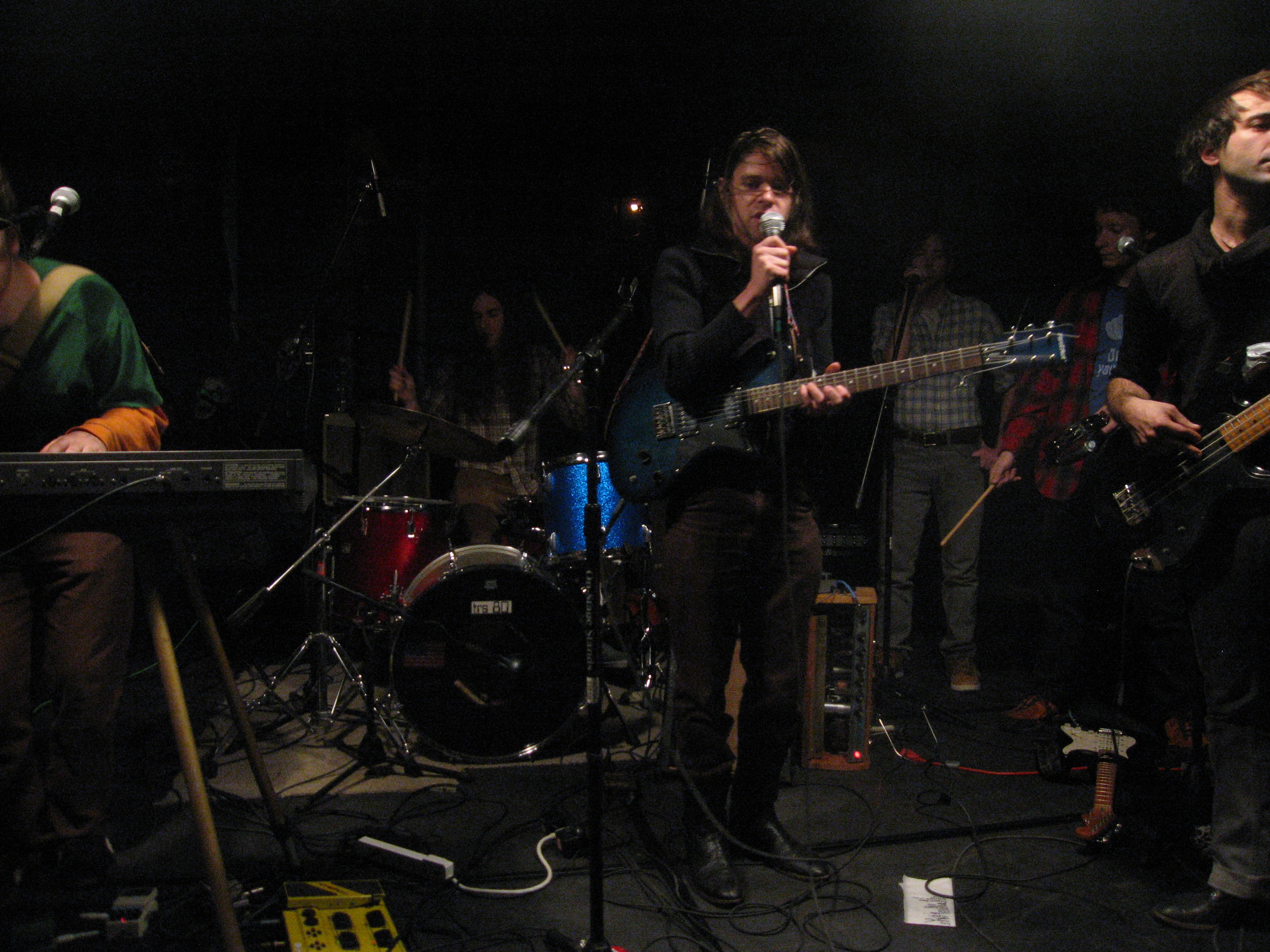
Ariel Pink's Haunted Graffiti performing in 2007

Virtually all of Pink's music released in the 2000s was written and recorded before 2004. Instead of releasing new music, he spent the latter half of the decade touring and searching for another record label ("I didn't want to make any new music until I got paid for it"). Between 2006 and 2008, lesser-known labels issued four more albums, Underground (1999), Lover Boy, and the compilations Scared Famous (2007) and Oddities Sodomies Vol. 1 (2008).

In 2006, Pink embarked on a few supporting tours and assembled a group backed with Jimi Hey, John Maus, Gary War, and girlfriend Geneva Jacuzzi. Musician and collaborator Cole M. Greif-Neill characterized Pink's reputation "on the L.A. scene" around this time as "the lame drug guy". In 2007, Pink and Maus backed Animal Collective's Panda Bear (Noah Lennox) for his solo tour of Europe. In 2008, Pink established a more consistent touring band with keyboardist/guitarist/backing vocalist Kenny Gilmore, drummer/vocalist/guitarist Jimi Hey (later replaced by Aaron Sperske), and guitarist Cole M. Greif-Neill. Bassist Tim Koh found it "the most difficult music I've ever tried to play. Even something that sounds simple, like 'For Kate I Wait', took me months. I still don't have it exactly."

In later years, Rosenberg said the name "Ariel Pink" was not meant as a persona or pseudonym. The "common misconception," he said, started when promoters billed his early 2000s live shows as "Ariel Pink" fronting a band called the "Haunted Graffiti". He said: "There's no Ariel Pink [...] My name's Ariel Rosenberg and I have a solo project that I called Ariel Pink's Haunted Graffiti. [...] automatically people assumed that [the band] must be the 'Haunted Graffiti'." The original liner notes to these early albums, while credited to "Ariel Pink's Haunted Graffiti", also distinctly credit "Ariel Pink" with performing, recording, or writing the music. (Note: The liner notes for Before Today also refer to "Ariel Pink's Haunted Graffiti" as a band.) Pink was the only member of his band to appear on all four of his albums from the 2010s.

=== 2010–2016: Before Today, Mature Themes, and Pom Pom ===
"Round and Round" from Before Today (2010)
Pitchfork's Jayson Greene wrote that "Round and Round" became known as an "indie anthem" with Before Today signaling "a leap to a new stage from his cult beginnings that made his skill as a songwriter and craftsman clear."

After securing a deal with 4AD, Rosenberg and his band recorded Before Today, his first album created in a professional studio, with a producer, and with an engineer. At the time, he called it the first official album of his discography and the first "made with any kind of thought or consciousness that I have an audience." Some of its songs were written years earlier, such as "Beverly Kills", which originally appeared on Scared Famous. Its making was fraught with personal difficulties, with some band members briefly quitting, including Rosenberg himself. Koh called the album "a nightmare to record" and said sessions "got so bad, I quit, and Cole quit. So we ended up recording most of it again at my house just to fix all the shit that producer Sunny Levine did wrong."

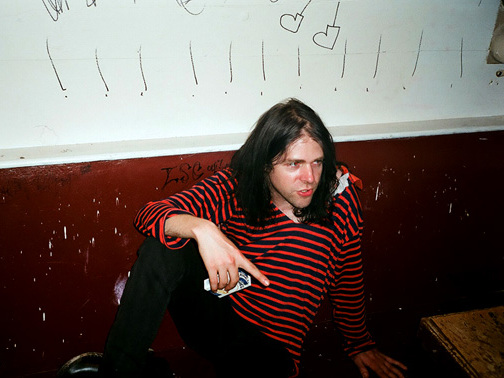
Pink after a show in 2010

Released in June 2010, the album reached number 163 on the Billboard 200 and received critical acclaim. Pitchfork highlighted the album as "Best New Music"; reviewer Mark Richardson wrote that many of the lo-fi idiosyncrasies that characterized his early recordings were eliminated and that careful attention was given to the arrangements: "It turns out that these details make a big difference, even while the album adheres to the hazy overriding aesthetic of Pink's earlier records." The album was soon featured on numerous "best of 2010" lists, and at the end of the year, Pitchfork crowned its lead single "Round and Round" the year's best track.

In 2011, Pink released a 16-minute standalone single, "Witchhunt Suite for WWIII", to commemorate the 10th anniversary of the September 11 attacks. It was a newly recorded version of a track, begun in 2001, that he had sold on CD-Rs during his 2007 tour. In April, he sabotaged his performance at the Coachella music festival by causing feedback with his microphone and refusing to sing; he then left the stage and apologized to the crowd. He later explained that the group had "set up in a new configuration" without consulting him first and that the "whole point of that action was not that I was unstable or anything ... I was hammering the point that I could embarrass the fuck out of them if they didn't listen to me and that this was not a democracy, this was a police state."

Pink struggled to keep his band together and later said that Koh and Gilmore threatened to leave if he did not dismiss drummer Aaron Sperske from the line-up. In 2012, Sperske sued Pink and the band for $1 million (~$1.35 million in 2024) after claiming to be "squeezed out" of an established "oral partnership". Pink responded with an announcement on Facebook that the Haunted Graffiti band was over. Afterward, he said, "I could dissolve the band in a second, and I'd do it before I'd let him do that to the [other members of the band.] I put that Facebook post up to see if it would resonate with Aaron." They reached a court settlement in 2013.

Mature Themes, the follow-up to Before Today, came in August 2012. Unlike Before Today, the material on the album was newly written especially for the LP. Some critics suggested that its more flamboyant and satirical tone was meant to alienate new fans. (Note: In a 2014 interview, Pink stated: "I'm much more satisfied with having my name entering the lives of new fans rather than making all the old fans happy. I'm much more interested in the 99,9999 % of the population that have never heard of me.") It nonetheless had a slightly higher chart peak than Before Today, at number 136. Pink referred to it as a "breakup album" in some interviews and denied that it was one in others. His ex-girlfriend Geneva Jacuzzi made a cameo appearance in the video for "Only in My Dreams", where she is shown evicting Pink from their apartment. During a magazine photoshoot, photographers asked him to dye his hair bright pink, something he reluctantly went along with "because I do music and I'm speaking to adolescents and I have to own that. I can't be just a grandpa and a sourpuss." He also disagreed with the manner in which 4AD marketed him and his band.

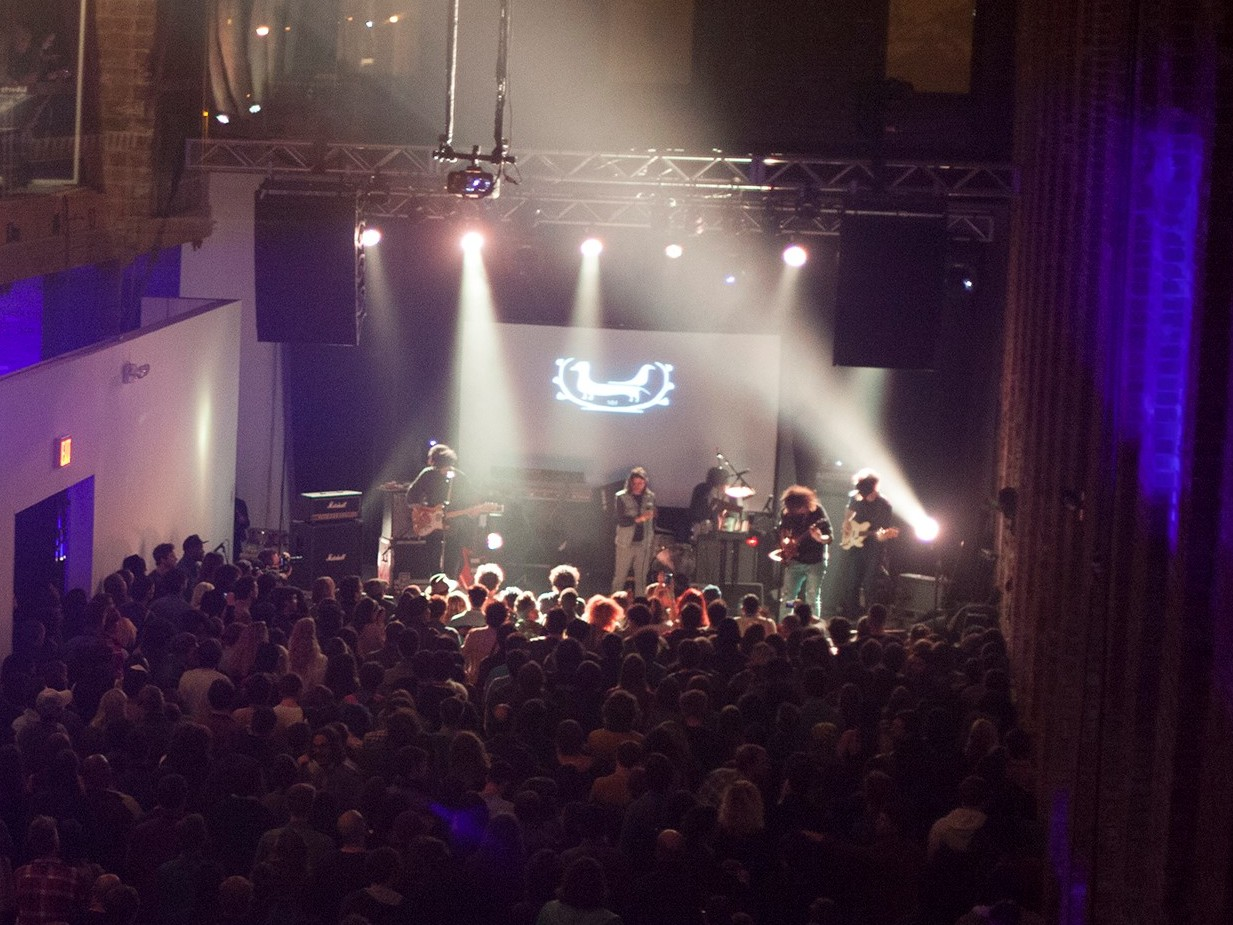
Pink performing with his band in Brooklyn, 2013

In November 2014, 4AD released Pom Pom, which rose to number 150 on the Billboard 200 amid generally positive reviews. It was Pink's first album to drop "Haunted Graffiti" from its credit, and his last issued through 4AD. Most of the tracks were written with collaborators like Kim Fowley, who dictated from his hospital bed (he died of cancer in January 2015). Other songs were reworked from his earlier self-released CD-R era. The press attention Pink received upon the album's release largely focused on recent comments he had made in various interviews. In one interview, he referred to the album as his "first real record" and said he removed the Haunted Graffiti credit "to give it the feeling of an event, a little bit different from the norm."

=== 2017–2020: Bobby Jameson and Mexican Summer remasters ===
After Pom Pom, Pink collaborated on a variety of projects by other musicians, including Weyes Blood, Dâm-Funk, Sky Ferreira, Charli XCX, Miley Cyrus, Theophilus London, the Avalanches, Puro Instinct, Lushlife, Mild High Club, Don Bolles, Water Tower, and MGMT. Pink and Weyes Blood jointly recorded the EP Myths 002. It was released in January 2017 on the Brooklyn-based label Mexican Summer.

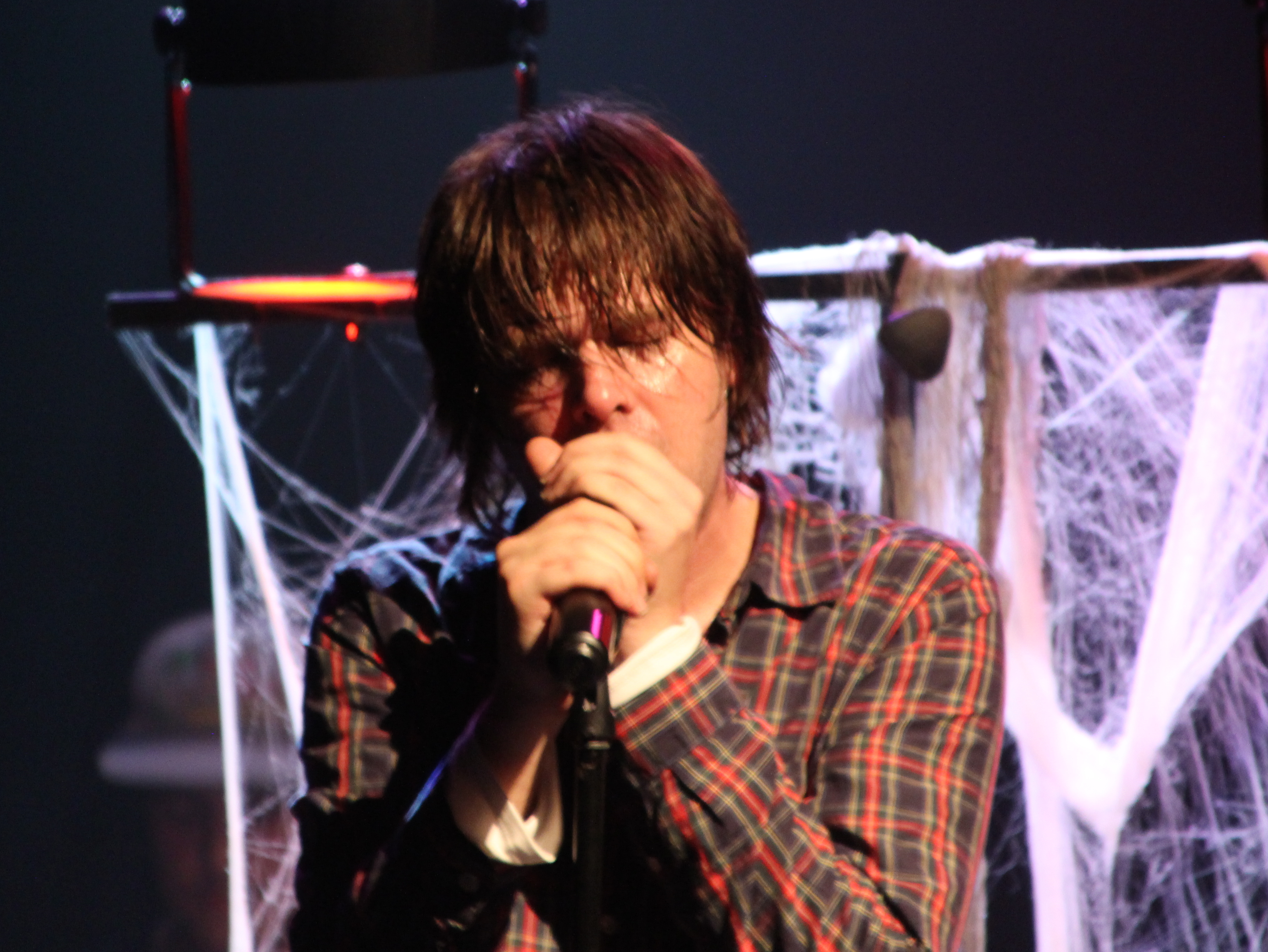
Pink performing in October 2017

Dedicated to Bobby Jameson, released in September 2017, marked Pink's first solo LP on Mexican Summer. In deliberate contrast to Pom Pom, it was recorded with a relatively small group of people at his home. The album was released to a number 193 chart peak amid generally favorable reviews. In promotional interviews, Pink indicated that his desire for attention and willingness to release albums has declined, and instead talked mostly about the musician Bobby Jameson. In November 2018, he performed among artists celebrating the tenth anniversary of Mexican Summer, where he announced on stage that he intended it to be his final show with his band.

In 2019, Mexican Summer announced that they would issue remastered and expanded editions of Pink's original Haunted Graffiti albums in addition to compilations of previously unreleased work recorded between 1999 and 2018. These remasters sought to correct various engineering mistakes from the Paw Tracks reissues, such as restoring stereo tracks that had been collapsed to mono.

The label stated that they would release the albums in quarterly installments as part of its "Ariel Archives" campaign, beginning with Odditties Sodomies Vol. 2 and remasters of Underground and Lover Boy in October 2019. The Doldrums, Worn Copy, and House Arrest followed the next April. The final cycle would be released in January 2021, which included reissues of Odditties Sodomies Vol. 1, the double album Scared Famous/FF>>, Odditties Sodomies Vol. 3, a compilation of post-hiatus tracks from the late 2000s Sit n' Spin, and a bonus compilation of unreleased material entitled Archevil.

=== 2021–2024: Ariel Pink's Dark Side ===
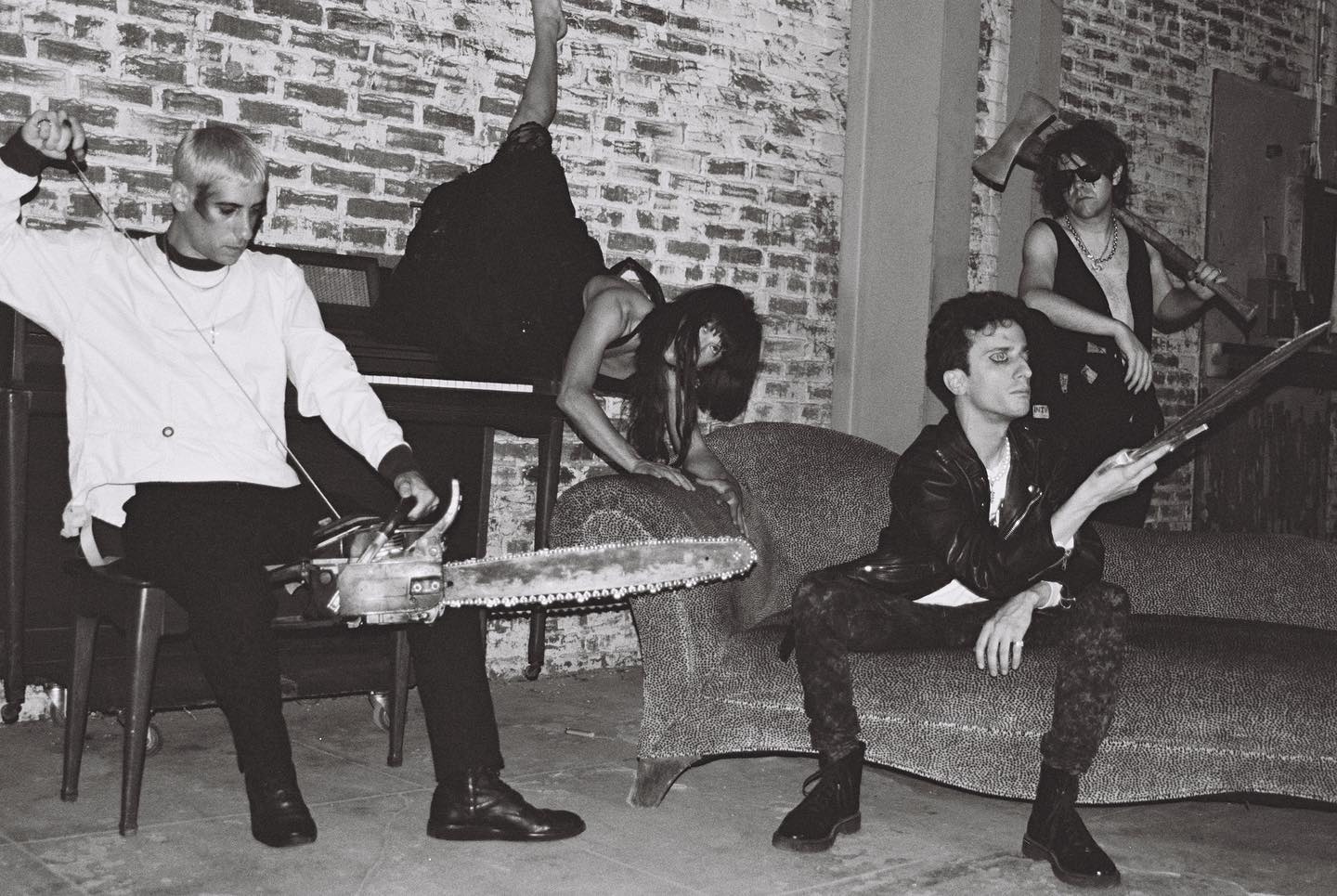
Ariel Pink, Nick Noto (Dark Side Family Jams), Chloe Chaidez, David Stagno (from right to left)

In a December 2020 interview, Pink intimated that he may never release another album due to contemporary social and political affairs, and wrote that he was "not thinking about making art at the moment." The next month, he traveled to Washington D.C. and attended the Donald Trump rally that preceded the storming of the Capitol. Many publications, including New York Magazine, Spin, and Vice, incorrectly reported that he was part of the group who stormed the Capitol.

Pink stated that he had attended the rally to "peacefully show his support for President Trump", and that after watching the president speak, he immediately returned to his hotel. Two days later, Mexican Summer announced that they would "end our working relationship with Ariel Rosenberg AKA Ariel Pink moving forward." Pink subsequently appeared on the Fox News program Tucker Carlson Tonight, where he declared that the lack of label support, combined with his inability to continue touring, had left him "pretty much [...] destitute and on the street."

In August 2021, Pink announced through social media a new album, The Key of Joy is Disobedience, credited to "Ariel Pink's Dark Side" and recorded with producer/musician Nick Noto (Dark Side Family Jams), David Stagno, and Chloe Chaidez. The first single from the album, "Horse-Head Mother", was released digitally on February 4, 2022.

Originally scheduled for release that same month, the full album was released on vinyl in a limited edition on August 12. The second single from the album, "Chupacabra", featuring the fictional musical group Vampiros was released digitally on October 14.

In late October, Never Made A Demo, Ever was released digitally via the Ariel Pink Substack website, containing over an hour of newly recorded material produced by the band since the completion of The Key of Joy is Disobedience. In August 2023, the single "I Wanna Be A Girl" from the album was released digitally across all platforms, as well as Songs from Spider City via Substack, featuring additional content from the APDS album sessions.

=== 2025: With You Every Night ===
On March 31, 2025, it was announced that the album titled With You Every Night, would be released sometime in 2025. A concert featuring the full album was played on May 2 at the Teragram Ballroom in Los Angeles, California. The album was released by LAC Records on September 12. The singles "With You Every Night" and "Everyone's Wrong" were released on digital platforms in advance of the album's release. The album was positively reviewed by The Oxford Student and AudioFuzz, described by the latter as a strong comeback record.

== Style and impact ==
=== Approach ===
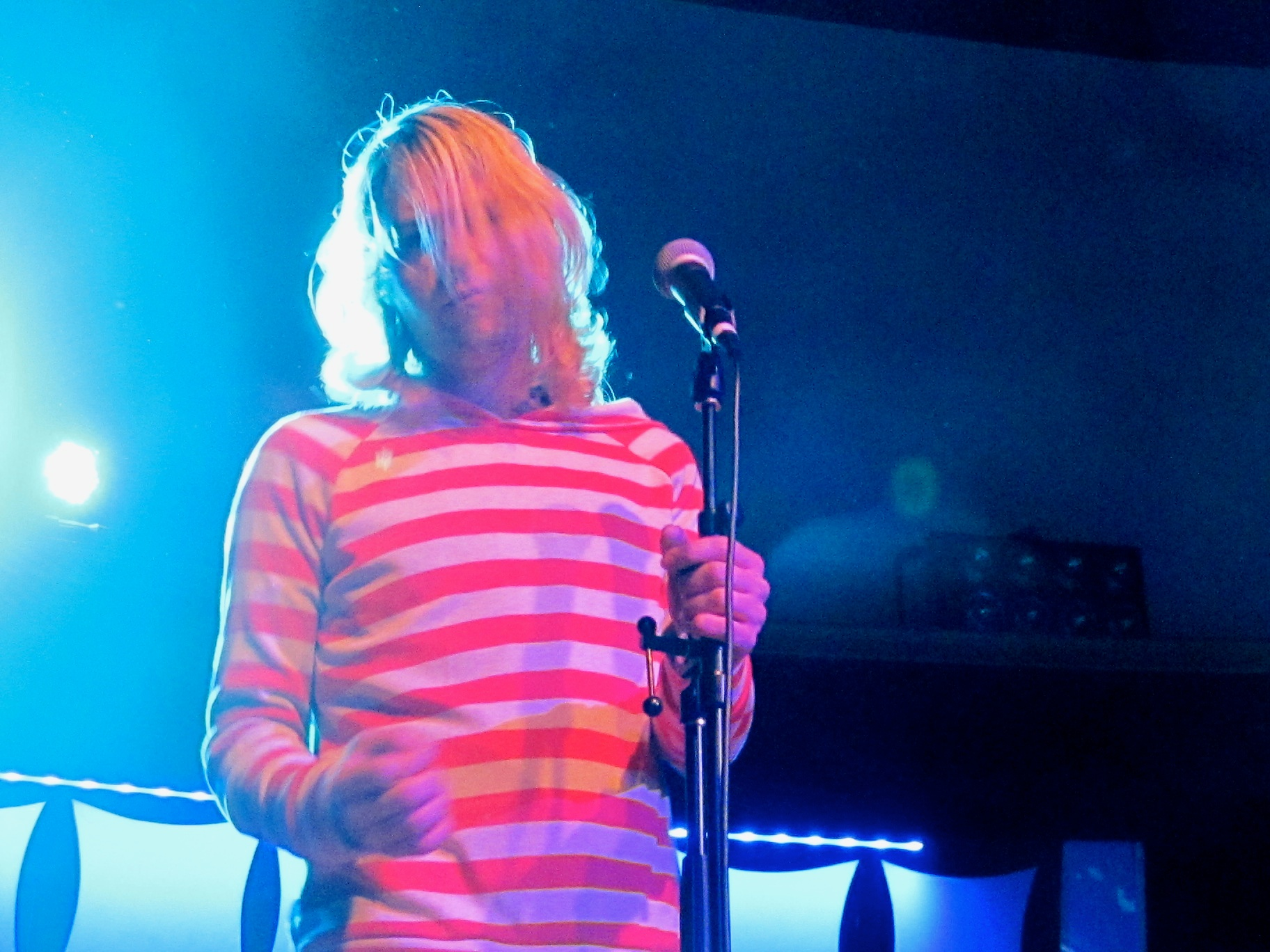
Ariel Pink performing in 2010

Pink's music encompasses a diverse selection of styles, sometimes within the same song, and espouses a postmodern take on pop music. His initial recordings blended lo-fi psychedelic pop with elements drawn from 1980s soft rock and "classic pop" from California. He likened his early records to a compendium of what he believed to be "everything good about music". Writing for Louder Than War, Maren McGlashan said that Pink typically draws from "the fuzzy glow of 1970s radio, the unapologetic weirdness of Zappa, the cool enthusiasm of New Wave and Western popular culture. At the center are the lo-fi aesthetics that have become the Haunted Graffiti speciality." Pink opined that while his own music is heavily indebted to 1960s pop, it is not classifiable in any genre.

His early recordings were amateurishly recorded on an eight-track cassette Portastudio. Since he was not a proficient instrumentalist, he usually tracked music parts one at a time in short increments. The use of cassettes lent a conspicuously lo-fi sound, which later became a deliberate aesthetic choice; he experimented with recording in professional studios and with digital audio workstations, but was dissatisfied with the results. Lyrically, he said that he is "not a poet" and that he approaches his work as "musical pieces" rather than songs, with the words usually written as an afterthought.

At the time of his Paw Tracks reissues, Pink was perceived as both an outsider and as a novelty act, as there were virtually no other contemporary indie acts with a similar retro lo-fi sound. Music critic Simon Reynolds noted that before Pink, lo-fi acts were generally "vehemently opposed to the slick, big-budget AOR and '80s rock 'n' soul that he's so inspired by." In 2014, Pink described his artistic philosophy as remaining in an era "somewhere in the forgotten '90s and '80s [...] the stuff that nobody listens to [...] and see what happens when you try to pause time and not affect it." In 2017, he reiterated that the sum of his work was "a weird art experiment" aimed at investigating "what would happen if I decided to plant myself in Cure-land" and create "the same thing over and over again forever, forever?" Fans of Pink's music came to include John Maus, Kurt Vile, Bradford Cox of Deerhunter, Christopher Owens of Girls, Alan Palomo of Neon Indian, and Beck.

R. Stevie Moore remarked that while he shared many musical approaches with Pink, "he doesn't much sound like me." In interviews in the 2000s, Pink frequently praised Moore in an attempt to bring him more critical recognition. In turn, Moore said in 2008: "I think he has great ideas and great musical talents, but he shouldn't always have to sound like the Bee Gees on Mars. We've talked about it at length."

=== Hauntology and lo-fi revival ===
During the late 2000s, Pink was referenced in early discussions of hauntology in music. The renewed discussion of hauntology, in itself, was prompted by his emergence. In an August 2009 piece for The Wire, journalist David Keenan coined "hypnagogic pop" to describe a developing trend of 2000s lo-fi and post-noise music in which artists began to engage with elements of cultural nostalgia, childhood memory, and outmoded recording technology. Pink was among his examples. Reynolds soon adopted the term and cited Pink, along with Spencer Clark and James Ferraro, as the "godparents of hypnagogic". He also singled out Pink as the central figure in what he called the "Altered Zones Generation", an umbrella term for lo-fi, retro-inspired indie artists who were commonly featured on Altered Zones, a sister site for Pitchfork.

Reynolds compared Pink's influence to My Bloody Valentine's impact on the shoegaze genre. He wrote, "the sound Pink invented—'70s radio-rock and '80s new wave as if heard through a defective transistor radio, glimmers of melody flickering in and out of the fog—was so striking it could only become a chronic influence." Such a sound was most prominently attributed to Pink following the success of 2010's Before Today and the convergence of chillwave, lo-fi, and the assistance of the Web in nostalgia-driven pop culture marketing. That year, Pitchfork writer Mark Richardson said of Pink's influence:

His records didn't reach a lot of people, but many of those who heard them were inspired to start home recording projects of their own. So as different kinds of lo-fi music bubbled up from the indie underground in the last couple of years— from more placid chillwave to roughed-up garage rock to abstract instrumental music— and many of these bands were talking about his influence, all of a sudden Ariel Pink started looking way ahead of the game.

Uncut's Sam Richard profiled Pink as "a lo-fi legend" whose "ghostly pop sound" proved influential to chillwave acts such as Ducktails and Toro y Moi. Jeff Weiss of Pitchfork said The Doldrums "inspired chillwave and a lo-fi revival, as well as alter[ed] the perception of L.A. as an indie-rock backwater." Spin writer David Bevan credited Pink's "fascination with, and commitment to, recasting outdated, obsolescent media" with galvanizing what is "widely seen in the VHS-boosted, Polaroid-clad aesthetic embraced by a hundred blogs and apps." Sam Goldner of Vice posited that a direct link can be drawn between Pink's "recycling of cheesy older sounds" and vaporwave, adding that, in the early 2010s, Pink and fellow musician Grimes "together represented a massive shift in music that was about to happen" – namely "a new mindset within independent music, one that viewed 'high' and 'low' art as equal, complementary forces in a vast cultural expanse."

Pink said that he never claimed to be the "godfather" of "lo-fi", "hypnagogic pop", or "chillwave". He thought that "people are just having fun with ideas they get in their head. They find a way to frame artists in a certain way that makes them interesting." In a 2012 interview, he commented that although it was not his intention to evoke nostalgia, he was aware "that I was doing something that sounded like the trace of a memory you can't place [...] now, people take it for granted. They think this is the sound of today." He remarked in 2011, "I know I've left my mark already. I know when somebody's heard my music. I can hear it in their music."

Music writer Adam Harper contested that "the pop-art pastiche of hypnagogic pop" or the "mirror-shades-cool synth groove of chillwave" could be attributed to Pink's "largely rock-based" music. He argued that instead of "the progenitor or the AZ Generation, Pink can easily be understood as the youngest member of this mid-80s Cassette Culture Generation." Among predecessors, Harper lists R. Stevie Moore and the Cleaners from Venus' Martin Newell as the most notable. He referenced a 1990s observation by music critic Richie Unterberger that compared Moore to Newell's "lo-fi, murkily recorded affairs that couldn't hide the power of the melodies, or a wit that could be both tender and savage". Harper added: "The similarities [between Pink and Newell] don't end there – both in his dress and in his music, Martin Newell adopted the (even then) retro, androgynous, psychedelic image that would mark Ariel Pink out in the 00s". (Note: Matthew Ingram of The Wire additionally recognized Moore as "unwittingly provid[ing] the [genre's] template" through his influence on Pink's music.)

== Personal life ==
=== Public remarks ===
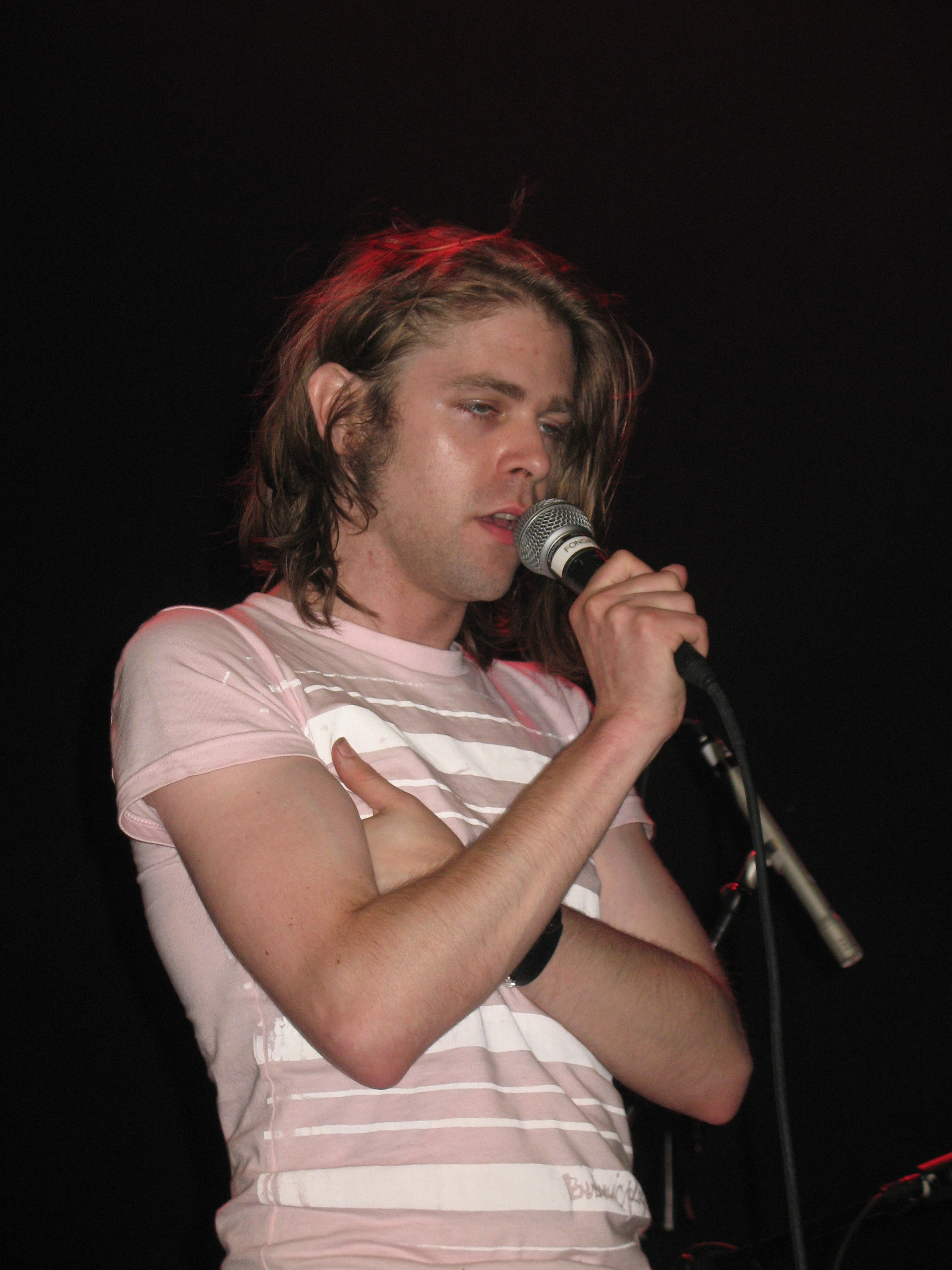
Performing in 2007

Many of Pink's remarks in interviews have incited controversy. Some of his provocations included "It's not illegal to be racist", "This gay marriage stuff pisses me off", and his expressed "love" for necrophiliacs, pedophiles, and the Westboro Baptist Church. His negative press reached a peak around the release of Pom Pom, when detractors variously labelled him a "troll", a "beta male", and a "misogynist". Fans argued that he is simply a glib speaker. (Note: Rhik Sammadar of The Guardian noted that "Pink has a particular tendency to pull radically insightful arguments from nowhere – about sensationalist media, the amorality of capitalism, liberal delusion – and cloak them in clangingly reactionary or inflammatory conclusions.")

In October 2014, Pink told the online journal Faster Louder that Interscope Records had contacted him about working with Madonna. He said they needed "something edgy. [...] She can't just have her Avicii, her producers or whatever, come up with a new techno jam for her to gyrate to and pretend that she's 20 years old." The article embroiled him into a minor controversy, with musician Grimes calling his comments "delusional misogyny". He denied that he was a misogynist and said that he had only repeated what he was told by an Interscope agent. John Maus addressed Pink's remarks with a lengthy analysis published on Twitter. He concluded that Pink is not a misogynist, although he is "a nymphomaniac, a little girl, a dog, etc."

Pink admitted that one of his tactics with interviewers is to talk so much that the other person has no opportunity to ask a question. He resents interviews and fame, explaining "I'd like to get by without making a fool of myself, running my mouth all the time. It's not helping me." He also believes that some publications quote him out of context for clickbait, and that generally, "the media lies to us all the time." In a 2012 interview, when asked if he interacted with his Wikipedia page, Pink responded: "I tried to intervene very early on and my moderator [sic] said 'I think you should check your sources,' and I was like 'You're right. You're right. Who knows about Ariel Pink more than you do? You're right, you're absolutely right.'"

=== Relationships and family ===
During his early 20s, Rosenberg was married to a woman named Alisa. They divorced around 2004. From 2006 to 2012, he was in a relationship with the artist Geneva Jacuzzi. Pink was also involved in a relationship with singer-songwriter Soko.

As of 2012, his father Mario Rosenberg was a multi-millionaire, a wealth that Ariel stood to inherit. In 2014, Mario was one of 19 people convicted in a $154 million insurance-fraud scheme, described by authorities as "the largest medical-fraud prosecution" in US history. He pleaded no contest to the charge. According to his attorney, the plea was made due to his lack of funds to continue battling the case.

He was sued by his then-girlfriend and bandmate, Charlotte Ercoli Coe, for onstage sexual harassment. In response, in 2020 Pink filed civil harassment restraining orders against Coe. The suit was later dismissed, although the court did not rule on the merit of the allegations. A week after the courts rejected the suit, Pink stated that he was unable to afford legal representation, while his lawyer informed Pitchfork that they would soon file an appeal.

=== Beliefs ===
I'm not really skilled at doing anything other than yapping and politicking. [...] No one really wants to hear a musician talk about stuff like that though so I have no business in bringing it up.

— Ariel Rosenberg, 2017

In 2013, Pink appeared on the satirical Fox News program Red Eye with Greg Gutfield discussing space robots and marijuana use in the NFL. In 2015, he said he was grateful for the bullying he experienced as a child, as it taught him to be thick skinned, and commented that "[a]nyone who is crying about police brutality or victimization as an adult needs to stop it and realize the privileges we have in this country."

During a discussion of his religious views in 2012, Pink stated that he was always "reluctant to be religious, to fully embrace the tenets of Christianity or Judaism or whatever, but I also don't fully fall in with the science crew either". When asked if he celebrated Hanukkah, he explained that he did not, except when his parents invited him to do so. In a 2010 interview with Heeb Magazine, he remarked that people who boast of their Jewish pride are "fucking stupid". He explained: "I'm totally against all that. I think you're a man of the world. Worldly. We're all from the same DNA strand, you know. It's like potatoes are our brothers. So, so, so silly."

In a 2017 interview, Pink was asked to clarify his political leanings, to which he answered: "I would say I'm for America in whatever capacity that comes in ... If Hillary [Clinton] was going to win [the 2016 election] I would have been like, right on ... As long as we are a nation that comes together then that's all I care about." Asked if he was Republican or Democrat in an April 2020 interview, he responded that he did not "believe in party lines" and merely aligned with "whoever is in charge". Following the 2020 presidential election, Pink tweeted his support for Donald Trump.

In December 2020, during an appearance on the podcast Wrong Opinion, Pink stated that he believed the recent presidential election was tampered by the Democratic Party "in some sort of collaboration with China". He opined that Trump represented "an indictment on anything bullshit ... I'm so gay for Trump, I would let him fuck me in the butt." (Note: Furthermore, he voiced skepticism of the scientific community, saying that many of their claims, including those for climate change, "probably [are] bullshit" and politically influenced, and added that he had argued with his father, a medical doctor, about the effectiveness of the COVID-19 vaccine.) During his 2021 appearance on Tucker Carlson Tonight, Pink said that he believed that Trump had "lost [the election] fairly", but reaffirmed his support for Trump.

== Discography ==
- Underground (1999)
- The Doldrums (2000)
- Scared Famous and Fast Forward (2001)
- House Arrest (2002)
- Lover Boy (2002)
- Worn Copy (2003)
- Before Today (2010)
- Mature Themes (2012)
- Pom Pom (2014)
- Dedicated to Bobby Jameson (2017)
- With You Every Night (2025)
