= Internet Girl (internet personality) =

Depop seller of 1990's and 2000's clothing

- Born: Isabella McFadden; 2 August 1995 (age 31); Winnipeg, Manitoba, Canada
- Occupations: Fashion designer; businesswoman
- Years active: 2016–present

YouTube information
- Channel: INTERNETGIRL
- Years active: 2018–present
- Genre: Fashion
- Subscribers: 132 thousand
- Views: 9.24 million
- Last updated: August 14th, 2026

Isabella McFadden (born 2 August 1995), known online as Internet Girl, is a Canadian social media personality and noted Depop seller of 1990s and 2000s clothing. She sells clothing found at thrift stores as well as new clothing of her own design. Many of her sales come in the form of "style bundles", sets of clothing with matching accessories based upon a particular theme or style. She has become Depop's top seller in the United States, with her account reaching over 660,000 followers.

== Early life ==
McFadden was born in Winnipeg, Manitoba on 2 August 1995. She attended Lawrence Park Collegiate Institute in Toronto, and studied communication and film at Concordia University in Montreal, before dropping out to move to Los Angeles to become a Depop seller.
