= Pom Pom (album) =

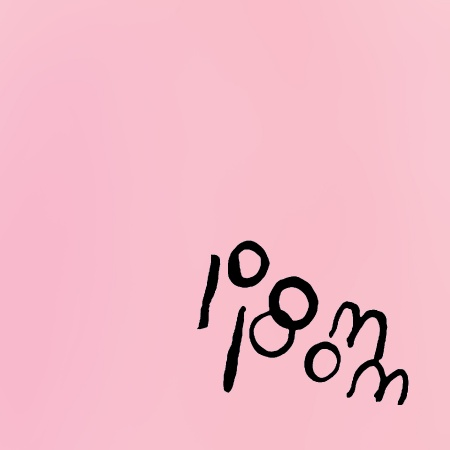

Studio album by Ariel Pink
- Released: November 17, 2014
- Genres: Art rock; psychedelic pop
- Length: 67:08
- Label: 4AD
- Producer: Ariel Pink

Ariel Pink chronology
Early Live Recordings (2013)	Pom Pom (2014)	Dedicated to Bobby Jameson (2017)

Singles from Pom Pom
- 1. "Put Your Number in My Phone" Released: August 9, 2014

Pom Pom (stylized as pom pom) is the tenth studio album by American recording artist Ariel Pink, released on November 17, 2014 through 4AD. It was his first release credited solely to himself, and his last on 4AD. Several of its songs were co-written with the ailing Kim Fowley, who died the following January. Critics generally gave the album positive reviews. Only one single was issued from the album: "Put Your Number in My Phone".

== Background ==
Among direct influences on the album, Pink cited the Mothers of Invention, the Cure, and Todd Rundgren. The songs "Jell-O," "Plastic Raincoats In The Pig Parade", "Sexual Athletics", "Exile On Frog Street", and "Nude Beach A Go-Go" were co-written by Kim Fowley, from his hospital bed for Pink to perform. The album also features vocal contributions from French singer-songwriter Soko; Pink returned the favor by co-writing and guesting on two tracks off Soko's second studio album, My Dreams Dictate My Reality (2015). The track "Nude Beach a Go-Go" was also recorded by American rapper Azealia Banks. This version of the song, produced by Pink, appears on Banks' debut album Broke With Expensive Taste (2014).

The track "Put Your Number in My Phone" was released as the first single off the album on August 9, 2014. The music video for the track was released in September 2014. The music videos for the tracks "Picture Me Gone" and "Dayzed Inn Daydreams", both directed by Grant Singer, were released on November 4, 2014 and January 26, 2015, respectively. The latter video stars the Mau Maus frontman Rick Wilder.

== Promotion ==
Pink recalled that he "didn’t even get to promote the record per se. I was just put on a very strange track of trying to double down or back up on things I said or supposedly said or said in response to someone. It was like going down a rabbit hole of retardation." Shortly before the album's release, Pink reported to the online journal Faster Louder that "Interscope are calling me to help write Madonna's record. They need something edgy. They need songwriting. She can’t just have her Avicii, her producers or whatever, come up with a new techno jam for her to gyrate to and pretend that she’s 20 years old. They actually need songs. I’m partly responsible for that return-to-values thing." The comments attracted the attention of Grimes, who called it "delusional misogyny" on her Twitter. Pink dismissed the subsequent controversy as "clickbait journalism. The media lies to us all the time, and we always believe the media. Then Grimes – who’s completely stupid and retarded to believe any of it – jumps in and has her two cents. I'm not a misogynist. ... I was only repeating what Interscope told me about why they needed me. They’re not my opinions."

== Critical reception ==
Professional ratings
Aggregate scores
Source	Rating
AnyDecentMusic?	7.1/10
Metacritic	75/100
Review scores
Source	Rating
AllMusic	3.5/5 stars
The A.V. Club	B+
The Guardian	2/5 stars
NME	8/10
The Observer	3/5 stars
Pitchfork	8.8/10
Q	4/5 stars
Rolling Stone	3.5/5 stars
Spin	8/10
Uncut	8/10

Upon its release, pom pom was met with generally positive reviews from music critics. At Metacritic, which assigns a normalized rating out of 100 to reviews from critics, the album received an average score of 75 based on 28 reviews, indicating "generally favorable reviews".

Louis Pattison of NME stated that the album is "funny, melancholy, randy, touching, disgusting and deeply, deeply strange," adding that "it has the feel of a magnum opus." Paste critic Philip Cosores described the album as "probably the most accessible, easy-on-the-ear and enjoyable music of his career, without any asterisks." Pitchfork critic Jeff Weiss praised the album, which received a "Best New Music" rating on the website, writing: "The campy flair, smirking irony, and deliberately "retrolicious" alliteration matches the scarecrow-genius of the album." Zachary Houle of PopMatters thought that the album is "gorgeous and silly – sometimes both at the same time." Colin Joyce of Spin described pom pom as "a record that's as full of unforgettably kaleidoscopic melodies as it is surreal shoutouts to Dolly Parton and Kurt Cobain--pom pom is just about as beautiful of a mess as Pink himself."

AllMusic critic Heather Phares thought that "the way Pink zigs and zags on Pom Pom can be dazzling or confusing depending on listeners' patience," further adding that "in its own way it's one of the best representations of what makes his music fascinating and occasionally frustrating." John Everhart of The A.V. Club stated that the album "feels at times more like a singles collection than a cohesive album, which isn’t to its detriment." Consequence of Sound critic Dean Essner wrote that "it’s discernible and then, suddenly, it’s not. But the surreal, visceral experience in itself is where the fun lies." Giuseppe Zevolli of Drowned in Sound wrote: "It is very easy to get lost in this record, but there is a miraculous balance that holds everything together."

Alexis Petridis of The Guardian criticized the album, writing that "it sounds like pop music made by someone who feels pop music is beneath him, deliberately crowding out his obvious abilities with stupid voices and noises." Kitty Empire of The Observer thought that "the unevenness of Pom Pom is a stumbling block, even allowing leeway for lysergic non-linearity."

== Track listing ==
No.	Title	Writer(s)	Length
1.	"Plastic Raincoats in the Pig Parade"	Ariel Pink, Kim Fowley	3:28
2.	"White Freckles"	Pink, Kenny Gilmore	2:46
3.	"Four Shadows"	Pink, Don Bolles	3:40
4.	"Lipstick"	Pink	3:22
5.	"Not Enough Violence"	Alex Kazemi, Pink, Bolles, Shags Chamberlain	6:06
6.	"Put Your Number in My Phone"	Pink, Jorge Elbrecht	2:53
7.	"One Summer Night"	Pink	3:55
8.	"Nude Beach a Go-Go"	Pink, Fowley, Azealia Banks	2:20
9.	"Goth Bomb"	Pink	2:43
10.	"Dinosaur Carebears"	Pink, Joe Kennedy, Chamberlain	5:23
11.	"Negativ Ed"	Pink	3:18
12.	"Sexual Athletics"	Pink, Bolles, Fowley	4:02
13.	"Jell-O"	Pink, Fowley	2:01
14.	"Black Ballerina"	Pink	5:52
15.	"Picture Me Gone"	Pink, Justin Raisen, Mary Raisen	5:39
16.	"Exile on Frog Street"	Pink, Kennedy, Fowley	4:48
17.	"Dayzed Inn Daydreams"	Pink	4:52
Total length:			67:08

== Personnel ==
- Ariel Pink – vocals, guitar, bass, keyboards, composition, production, artwork, layout, lyrics
- Joe Kennedy – backing vocals, synthesizer, harmonies, composition
- Kenny Gilmore – drums, backing vocals, engineering, editing, keyboards, bass guitar, composition
- Don Bolles – drums, guitar, backing vocals, harmonies, recording, composition
- Jorge Elbrecht – guitar, vocals, synthesizer, sampler, composition
- Shags Chamberlain – synthesizer, vocals, bass, sequencing, programming, composition
- Justin Raisen – guitar, composition
- Tim Koh – bass, vocals, drums
- Cole Greif-Neill – programming drums, live drums, Ableton, Logic
- Jimi Hey – drums, electronic flute
- Jason Pierce – guitar
- Kim Fowley – writing
- Alex Kazemi – writing
- Mary Raisen – writing
- Jack Name – guitar, analog synthesizer, vocals, radar, OPS
- Ben Brown – guitar, vibraphone, violin arrangements, organ
- Alex Brettin – twelve-string guitar
- Ben Salomon – vibraphone
- Chloe Sykes – vocals
- Piper Kaplan – vocals
- Soko Sokolinski – vocals
- Phillip Haut – engineering
- Samlir Kholija – engineering, recording
- David Ives – mastering
- Matt Fishbeck – artwork, layout
- Linda Rosenberg – photography

== Charts ==
Chart (2014)	Peak position
US Billboard 200	150
US Billboard Alternative Albums	20
US Billboard Heatseekers	2
US Billboard Independent Albums	18
US Billboard Top Rock Albums	31
US Billboard Tastemaker Albums	12
