= The Doldrums (album) =

Studio album by Ariel Pink's Haunted Graffiti
- Released: 2000
- Recorded: September 1999 – April 2000
- Genres: Lo-fi; hypnagogic pop; dream pop; psychedelic
- Length: 44:59
- Label: Paw Tracks

Ariel Pink's Haunted Graffiti chronology
| Underground (1999) | The Doldrums (2000) | Scared Famous (2002) |

The Doldrums is the second album by American recording artist Ariel Pink, self-released in 2000. It is the second album credited to his solo music project, "Ariel Pink's Haunted Graffiti", and the second installment in his Haunted Graffiti series. On October 11, 2004, the album was released through Animal Collective's Paw Tracks label, where it received critical acclaim.

The album has since been recognized for its influence on subsequent lo-fi acts, as well as a defining release of the hypnagogic pop movement. In 2020, a remastered edition of the album was released by Mexican Summer.

== Background ==
According to LA Weekly, The Doldrums was recorded during Pink's final semester at CalArts, in which time he was "in the throes of a drug binge". "I'm sure those were my words," he later said. "I don’t know. It was fine. I had a typical art school experience, I suppose, if you consider getting drunk at openings, partying with your 'teachers,' and shrugging off scholastic duties as often as possible as something typical of college experience." For final examinations, he submitted a "kiosk where I was selling The Doldrums on CD. That was my art piece."

The album was originally issued in 2000 in CD-R format, copies of which were handmade by Pink himself. One such copy was passed on by Pink to the band Animal Collective, who found the copy on their tour van floor and, impressed by its music, later contacted Pink and offered to re-issue it on their own Paw Tracks label. The Doldrums was subsequently re-issued on October 11, 2004, by Paw Tracks as the first of a series of re-issues of Haunted Graffiti albums by the label.

== Critical reception ==
Professional ratings
Review scores
| Source | Rating |
|---|---|
| AllMusic | 4/5 stars |
| Fact | 5/5 |
| Mojo | 4/5 stars |
| Pitchfork | 5.0/10 |
| Spin | A |
| Stylus Magazine | B+ |
| Uncut | 5/5 stars |

An uncredited writer for Spin called the album "a lo-fi masterpiece." AllMusic reviewer Joshua Glazer called it "one of the most wonderfully skewed takes on classic pop you're likely to hear," noting that "its hazy production obscures inklings of '70s AM radio-styled songwriting, and Pink's gift for melody is almost as strong as his tendency towards weirdness." David Stubbs from Uncut wrote that the songs' "range, volatility and Simultaneist overload sounds like The Beatles circa 1967, The Human League, FM radio's Hall Of Fame, Phil Spector, Tiny Tim and the great R. Stevie Moore all frolicking at once in an acid bath in his own head." Stylus' Mike Powell credited the album with accomplishing "the difficult task of drawing something genuine out of music and affects that seem deliberately and relentlessly depth-less."

Less favorably, Pitchfork's Nick Sylvester opined: "The songs are secondary to Pink's bourgeoning cult of personality-- the album turns its imperfections into selling points, its pigheadedness into firm resolve. ... we understand the supposed appeal of The Doldrums: These are normal songs, except a 'crazy' guy is singing them, and he has 'crazy' lo-fi production."

Among retrospective assessments, in 2011, Fact's Tom Lea called it "Pink's masterpiece." In 2013, critic Simon Reynolds named the album among his favorite records of the 2000s, suggesting that its "reverb haze could be a semi-conscious attempt to recreate the blissfully indiscriminate way that children listen to pop music, before they learn what's cool or uncool."

== Track listing ==
All tracks are written by Ariel Pink.

The Doldrums
| No. | Title | Length |
|---|---|---|
| 1. | "Good Kids Make Bad Grown Ups" | 4:39 |
| 2. | "Strange Fires" | 4:06 |
| 3. | "Among Dreams" | 4:19 |
| 4. | "For Kate I Wait" | 4:19 |
| 5. | "Haunted Graffiti" | 3:50 |
| 6. | "Gray Sunset" | 3:38 |
| 7. | "The Doldrums" | 4:02 |
| 8. | "Envelopes Another Day" | 5:08 |
| 9. | "The Ballad of Bobby Pyn" | 10:58 |
| Total length: | | 44:59 |

Vital Pink – 2004 bonus tracks
| No. | Title | Length |
|---|---|---|
| 10. | "Don't Think Twice (Love)" | 2:06 |
| 11. | "Until the Night Dies" | 3:41 |
| 12. | "Crying" | 2:16 |
| 13. | "Theme From Unreleased "Claris Gardens"" | 2:54 |
| 14. | "Let's Build a Campfire There" | 4:13 |
| 15. | "Young Pilot Astray" | 2:28 |
| Total length: | | 62:10 |
