= Before Today =

Studio album by Ariel Pink's Haunted Graffiti
- Released: June 8, 2010
- Recorded: 2009–2010
- Studio: House of Blues Studios (Encino, CA); various band members' home studios
- Genre: Pop; hypnagogic pop; indie rock; experimental pop
- Length: 44:48
- Label: 4AD
- Producer: Sunny Levine; Ariel Pink's Haunted Graffiti; Van Deferens Organization

Ariel Pink's Haunted Graffiti chronology
Worn Copy (2003)	Before Today (2010)	Mature Themes (2012)

Before Today is the eighth studio album by American recording artist Ariel Pink, credited to "Ariel Pink's Haunted Graffiti", and released on June 8, 2010. The album marked Pink's debut on the record label 4AD. It was his first official LP of new recordings since 2003's Worn Copy and his first written and recorded with a supporting band, referred to in the liner notes as "Ariel Pink's Haunted Graffiti".

The album was critically acclaimed upon release, with Pitchfork placing the album at #9 on its list of "The Top 50 Albums of 2010". Lead single "Round and Round" was also ranked by Pitchfork as the best track of 2010.

== Composition ==
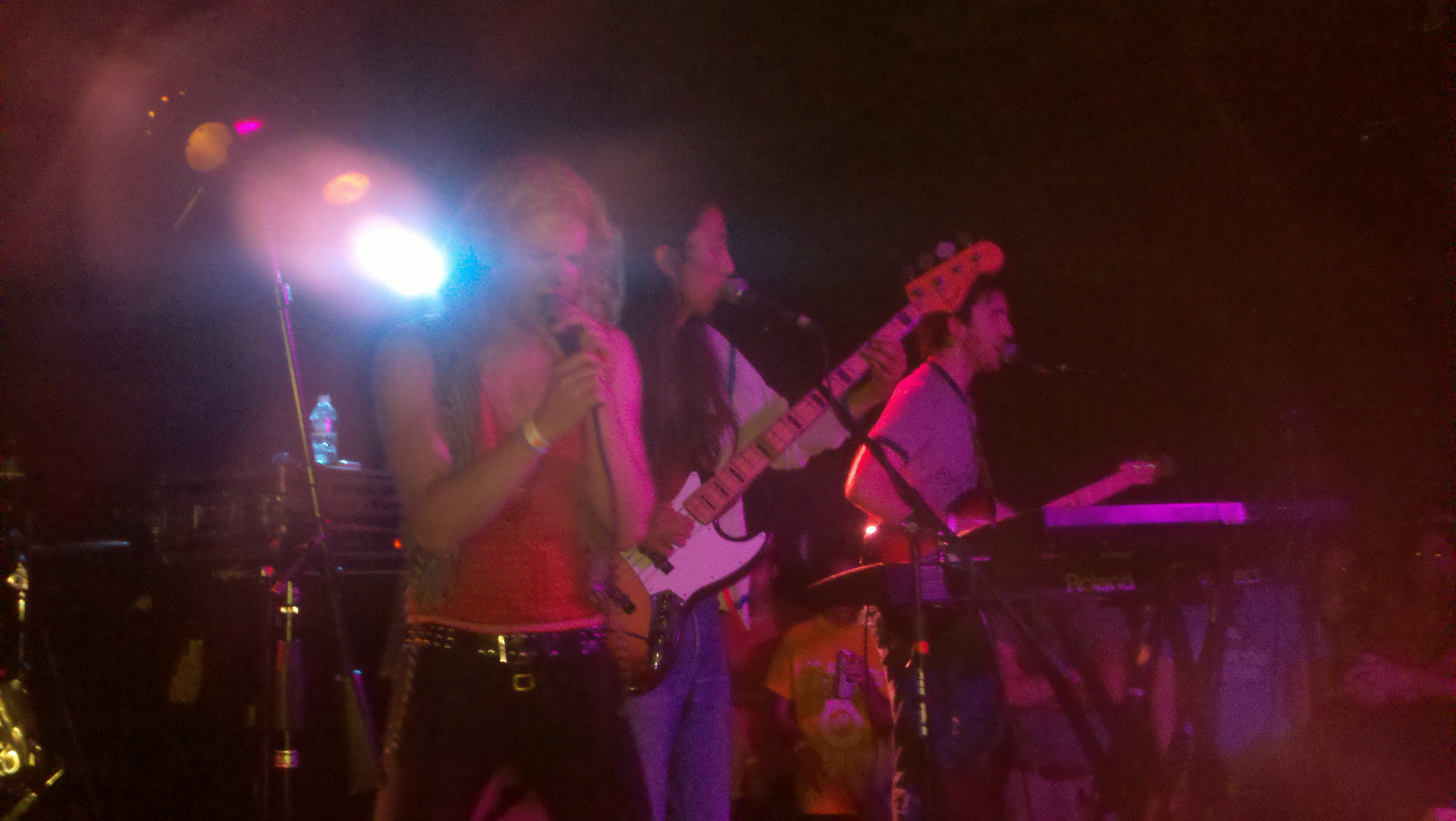
Ariel Pink's Haunted Graffiti performing in 2010

The album's opening track, "Hot Body Rub" previously appeared (in an alternative version) on an EP Ariel Pink with Added Pizzazz, which was a collaboration between Vas Deferens Organization (as producers) and Ariel Pink who are friends to each other. VDO provided production for this track, as well as thanks to one of its members, Eric Lumbleau, Pink made friends with Gonzales family who appeared on it.

The album contains several homages to vintage rock and pop songs, including "Bright Lit Blue Skies," written by Ronn Campisi and performed by the Rockin' Ramrods in 1966, and "Beverly Kills," which draws heavily on Ago's 1982 track "For You" and Olivia Newton-John's "Physical." "Reminiscences" is an instrumental cover of an Ethiopian pop song, "I Remember a Man" by Yeshimebet Dubale.

== Critical reception and legacy ==
Professional ratings
Aggregate scores
Source	Rating
AnyDecentMusic?	7.9/10
Metacritic	85/100
Review scores
Source	Rating
AllMusic	5/5 stars
The A.V. Club	B
The Guardian	4/5 stars
The Irish Times	4/5 stars
Mojo	4/5 stars
NME	8/10
Pitchfork	9.0/10
Q	4/5 stars
Spin	7/10
Uncut	4/5 stars

Exclaim! named "Before Today" the No. 15 Pop & Rock Album of 2010. Exclaim! writer Dimitri Nasrallah said that "Before Today is a hard-earned victory lap for Pink, not only the most triumphantly realized album of his left-of-centre catalogue, but a much-needed second wind for an artist who very nearly finished off the decade as another minor curiosity in outsider-pop's long lineage." The album placed seventh in The Wire's annual critics' poll.

As of 2011, it has sold 25,942 copies in the United States, according to Nielsen SoundScan.

== Track listing ==
Standard edition
No.	Title	Length
1.	"Hot Body Rub"	2:26
2.	"Bright Lit Blue Skies"	2:25
3.	"L'estat (Acc. to the Widow's Maid)"	4:26
4.	"Fright Night (Nevermore)"	3:35
5.	"Round and Round"	5:08
6.	"Beverly Kills"	3:56
7.	"Butt-House Blondies"	3:27
8.	"Little Wig"	5:46
9.	"Can't Hear My Eyes"	3:19
10.	"Reminiscences"	2:34
11.	"Menopause Man"	4:00
12.	"Revolution's a Lie"	3:49
Total length:		44:48

Bandcamp edition
No.	Title	Length
13.	"Mistaken Wedding"	04:00
14.	"Shades Away"	02:14
15.	"Phantasthma"	03:18
16.	"Hold Your Breath and Wait"	05:00

== Personnel ==
=== Ariel Pink's Haunted Graffiti ===
- Ariel Pink
- Aaron Sperske
- Cole M.G.N.
- Kenny Gilmore
- Tim Koh

=== Guest musicians ===
- Tamara Cauble – violin (#1)
- Aaron González – bass guitar (#1)
- Dennis González – trumpet (#1)
- Stefan González – drums (#1)
- Jim Lehnert – alto & baritone sax (#1)
- Eric Lumbleau – vocals (#1)
- Chris Cohen – backing vocals (#9)
- Max "Sax" Kaplan – saxophone (#9)
- Nedelle Torrisi – backing vocals (#9)

=== Technical ===
- Van Deferens Organization – production & engineering (#1)
- Ariel Pink's Haunted Graffiti – producers (#2–12)
- Sunny Levine – producer, engineer (#2–12)
- HG – engineer (#2–12)
- Rik Pekkonen – engineer (#2–12)
- John Golden – mastering (#1–4, 6–12)
- Christian Wright – mastering (#5)
- Douglas Lee – artwork
