= Cop Killer =

A cop killer is a person who kills a police officer.

Cop killer or Cop Killer may also refer to:

- "Cop Killer" (song), a 1992 song by American heavy metal band Body Count
- "Cop Killer", a 2011 song by American singer-songwriter John Maus
- Cop Killer (novel), a novel by Sjöwall and Wahlöö
- Copkiller, a 1983 Italian film starring Harvey Keitel
- Cop Killer, a 1988 television film starring Joseph Bottoms
- "Cop Killer" (CSI: Miami), an episode of CSI: Miami
- "The Cop-Killer" (short story), a 1951 Nero Wolfe novella by Rex Stout
- The Police Murderer (Polismördaren), a 1994 Swedish film
- Cop killer bullets, a name sometimes given to Teflon-coated bullets

== See also ==
- Cop Killa, alternate name for the Vertebreaker piledriver, a professional wrestling driver move
