= Screen Memories (album) =

Studio album by John Maus
- Released: October 27, 2017
- Recorded: 2015–2016
- Studio: Funny Farm, Austin, Minnesota
- Genre: Synth-pop; goth-pop; post-punk; new wave
- Length: 37:57
- Label: Ribbon
- Producer: John Maus

John Maus chronology
A Collection of Rarities and Previously Unreleased Material (2012)	Screen Memories (2017)	Addendum (2018)

Singles from Screen Memories
- 1. "The Combine" Released: August 29, 2017; 2. "Teenage Witch" Released: October 12, 2017; 3. "Touchdown" Released: October 23, 2017

Screen Memories is the fourth studio album by American musician John Maus, released on October 27, 2017. The album was his first set of newly-recorded music since We Must Become the Pitiless Censors of Ourselves (2011). Recorded in two years at his Austin, Minnesota home, most of its subject matter concerns apocalyptic themes inspired by the newsfeed of world events he garnered while making the LP. Some of its song structures and melodies were created with the aid of an artificial neural network.

The album received generally favorable reviews from critics, and was honored on numerous year-end lists by publications such as Uncut, The Wire, Fact, and Clash magazine. Commercially, the album peaked number 14 on Billboard's American Heatseekers Albums chart. Music videos were created for its three singles ("The Combine", "Teenage Witch", and "Touchdown"). Leftover tracks that were recorded for Screen Memories were included on Addendum, released on April 20, 2018.

Artwork was designed by Lia Sued Cabral. It features a typeface called Shatter, designed by Vic Carless.

== Background ==
After the favorable response to Maus' previous studio album We Must Become the Pitiless Censors of Ourselves (2011)—which was unprecedented for him—he became more widely accepted as an outsider artist. He did not release any new music for the next six years. Two years were devoted to finishing his dissertation, while another two were spent learning how to build modular synthesizers. At the same time, he started experimenting with recreational drugs for the first time in his life, "going into sensory deprivation tanks and just trying any trick I could think of. I became solely obsessed with this at the expense of anything else." His 338-page thesis "Communication and Control", which discussed the influence of technology on social control, was completed and submitted in 2014, and he was thereby awarded his PhD in political science from the University of Hawaii.

During Maus' absence, various contingents of popular music began indulging in throwbacks to 1980s culture. Maus acknowledged that his early albums may have anticipated this development, and that he "lament[s] that they've maybe been ripped off, but it’s not like, 'Oh, I should’ve gotten credited.' It’s more that it took a trick that I had up my sleeve away. ... [With vaporwave], even if I said it wasn’t always about retro, I had maybe tried to do that very thing and dropped a thread there for people to pick up on." Drowned in Sound critic Jack Doherty posited that the 1980s-inspired sound he was associated with had "accidentally entered the mainstream" thanks to the success of television series like Stranger Things (2016) and GLOW (2017).

== Production and composition ==
I think largely the details that I’m most focused on are precisely the sort that are going to be lost on most people. Like, "Look, this passage has four-voice counterpoint! It’s straight, I'm using parallel fifths in fugues—it's totally legit from the prescriptions of the Renaissance, but it’s still pop!"

—John Maus

Maus wrote and produced virtually all of Screen Memories by himself in his Austin, Minnesota home studio, nicknamed the "Funny Farm". All of the instruments Maus used for the album were manufactured by himself. The album builds upon the 1980s-inspired lo-fi of his previous albums. He built the instruments first, finishing them on November 30, 2014, and started recording the album in 2015. He hoped that in producing his own instruments, he would familiarize himself with them much easier and that it would "somehow" mean he would create new textures never heard before, that he could "control voltage with a computer in a way that the modular guys of the seventies could only hoped to have done with that sort of precision." However, "it ended up being that I could have just saved some time and used the digital plug-ins."

In an interview supporting the album, Maus expressed an affinity for post-war musicians that "follow the contradictions of what they’re already given through to their breaking point, as opposed to just starting from scratch or doing the wrong thing on purpose or whatever," citing examples such as the Beach Boys' "Good Vibrations" (1966) and the Beatles' "A Day in the Life" (1967). However, he denied that such principles influenced his recent work, and that he instead gave himself "more latitude to be 'complex' or something like that." To make his compositions more "surpris[ing]," he experimented with an artificial neural network for some tracks. He explained:

What I did was train a neural network on a bunch of harmonic sequences and then saw what it spit back out to me. I also messed around with Markov chains by feeding them thousands and thousands of chants. I messed around with a simple process where you take an integer sequence and let the numbers one-through-six designate the scale degree of a mode and then I added the additional thing of collapsing each consecutive, each I-iii-V I-IV-V triad into it. [...] finally the result was that it only spit back at me the rules that I put in place. The chaos just kind of shook the little machine that I made. I never heard the chaos as such, but I saw the otherwise invisible frame that I made being shook by the integer sequence.

Screen Memories was completed shortly before the November 2016 US presidential election. He had planned for the music to be guitar-oriented, but he "could never get it to work." Ultimately, the album's only guitar-heavy songs were "Find Out" and "Bombs Away". The latter is the only track on the album that he did not write alone; it is a cover of a song by Holy Shit, a duo that formerly consisted of Ariel Pink and Matt Fishbeck. When asked about perceived connections between his album and Pink's concurrently-released Dedicated to Bobby Jameson (2017), Maus answered that the two records "couldn't have been an influence onto each other at all because he was done before he heard what I was doing, and vice versa." The song "Pets" features a quotation of Arnold Schoenberg's string sextet Transfigured Night (1899).

== Themes ==
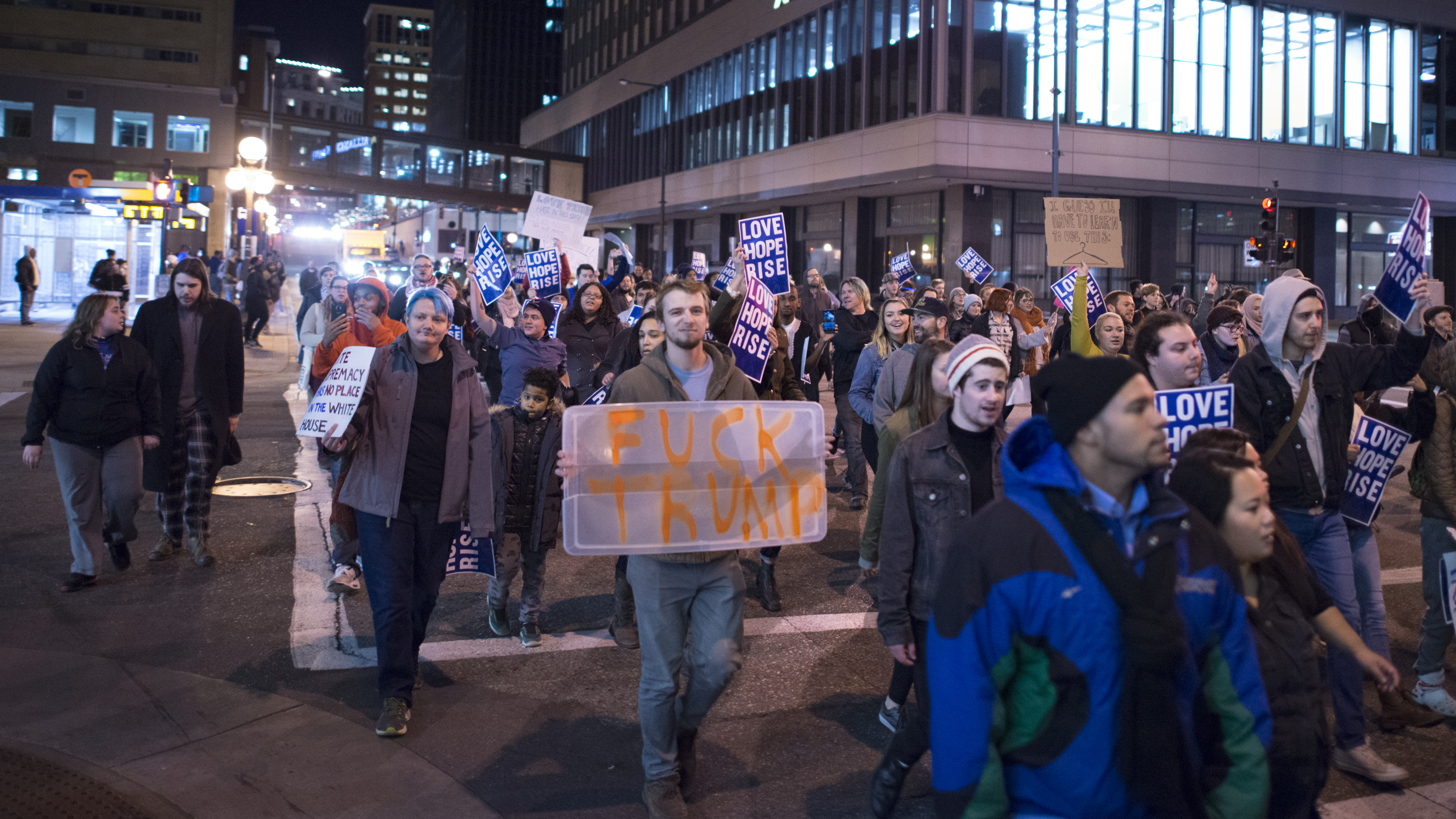
Hundreds of Minnesotan protesters marching on the day after the 2016 presidential election

Screen Memories is named after the Freudian concept of screen memories, which refers to a distorted memory from childhood. Maus named the album "Screen Memories" because, as he explained, "everything is mediated and distorted through the screens." He explained in how the name connects to the cover art, "There a sense of remembering when [a big television] was so much more of an enclosure, which has now exploded into the television in our pocket. Everything now...everybody knows it's all mediated through that device. Our social relations, our news feed—everything. Our memory."

Most of the album's subject matters concerns apocalyptic themes, which are presented through irreverent and wry humor. According to critic Gabriela Tully Claymore, Screen Memories reflects a more "foreboding" tone than Maus' past records. Maus did not engage in much social interaction while creating the album, and he only learned about the dark global political climate through newsfeeds. Critic Aine Devaney surmised that there is also "an air of Maus coming to terms with strayed and suppressed memories of pain." Writer Henning Grabow said the musical aspect of the songs are apocalyptic in that they are pop songs with "something wrong [...] – an apocalyptic, twisted notion." Maus named the song "Edge of Forever" after the Star Trek episode "The City On The Edge Of Forever."

The lyrics features references to aspects of popular culture such as Jean-Luc Picard and Masters of the Universe. Interviewing Maus for Nothing but Hope and Passion, Grabow said "the lyrics come in [an] abstract, repetitive pattern," and Maus agreed, stating "personally, I just don’t have any gift for verses – at all. There are many examples of verse meeting music to sublime effects but that’s not a skill that I’ve got or have the time to develop. Also, I think that verse is finally foreign to music. Some of the best tracks are just in the form of nonsense syllables." Writer Chal Ravens suggested Maus' lack of care towards the lyrics led to them having "unerasable mental image[s]," such as on "Teenage Witch" ("Want to start a fire, witch? For that icy titty?!") and "Pets" ("Your pets are gonna die!").

== Release and promotion ==
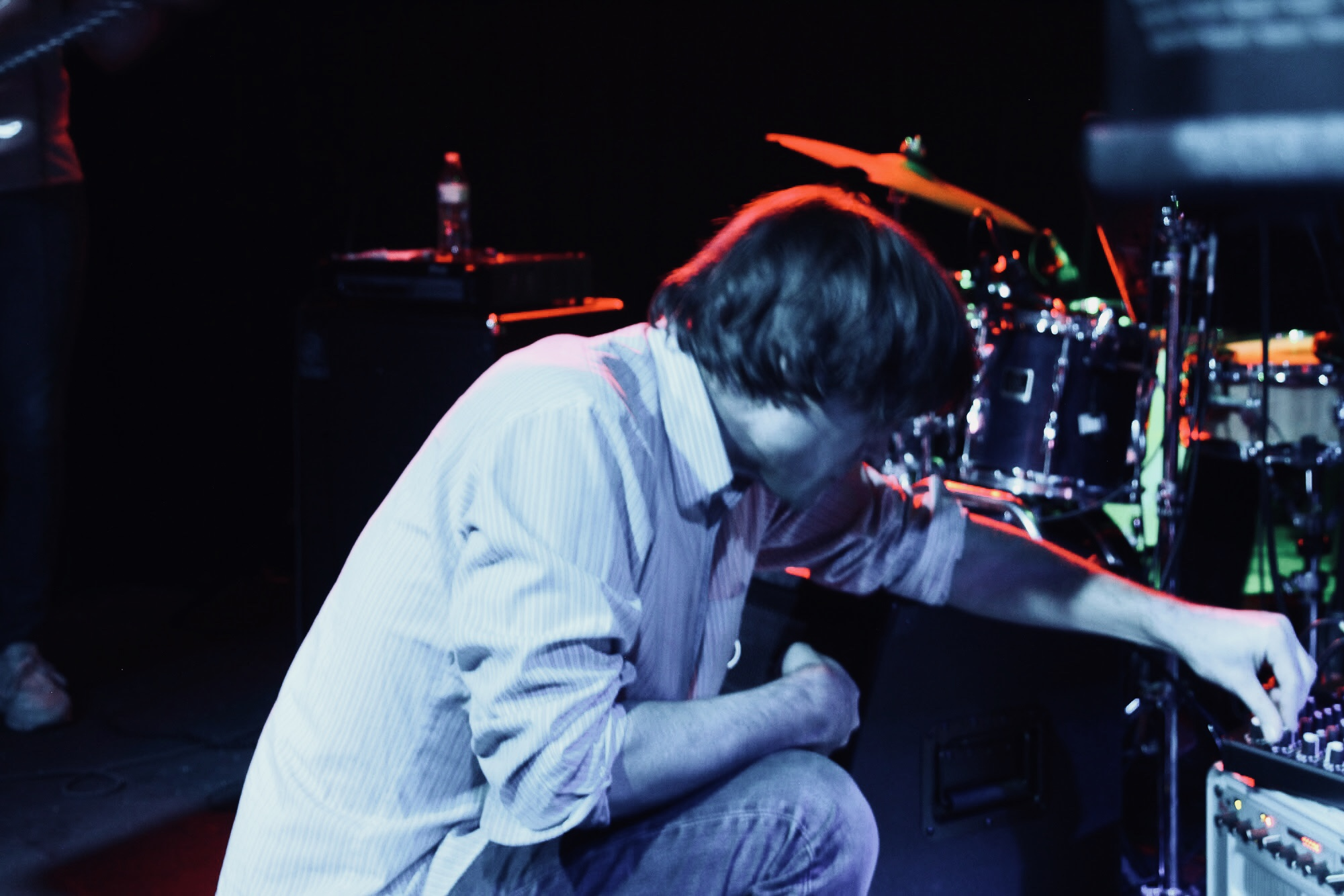
Maus performing with his band in support of Screen Memories, 2018.

In June 2017, Maus announced a summer tour, which became his first public performances since 2012, and suggested that new music would be released soon. It was his first solo tour with a live band, featuring his brother Joseph Maus on bass, Minneapolis musician Luke Darger on keyboards, and Jonathan Thompson on drums. On August 29, 2017, he revealed that Screen Memories was to be released in the fall of 2017. That same day, the LP's lead single, "The Combine," and its Tina Rivera-directed music video, "a lo-fi, psychedelic vision of farmlands being harvested" as Stereogum summarized, was released. On October 12, the music video and single for "Teenage Witch" premiered. The video is a collage of footage of Maus in his high school years. The video and single for "Touchdown" was issued on October 23. Its video, directed by Jennifer Juniper Stratford, "features fuzzy footage of football players and coaches, playing out like a retro promotional sports video but with a Stranger Things twist," Consequence of Sound described.

Ribbon Music released Screen Memories on October 27, 2017. On April 20, 2018, a box set of John Maus albums including Screen Memories was released by Ribbon. The set also includes an exclusive LP titled Addendum, which is a set of twelve tracks that are an "addendum" to Screen Memories. As Maus explained, "It was really more that I made an album, but then I realized I had two albums worth of stuff." According to him, the songs on Addendum were made in a more "carefree" manner than Screen Memories and are most resemblant of his usual style.

The tour associated with Screen Memories and Addendum came to an abrupt end on July 28, 2018, when Joseph died of an undiagnosed heart condition while with the band.

== Critical reception ==
Professional ratings
Aggregate scores
Source	Rating
AnyDecentMusic?	7.5/10
Metacritic	78/100
Review scores
Source	Rating
AllMusic	3.5/5 stars
The A.V. Club	B−
Exclaim!	9/10
Mojo	4/5 stars
The Observer	3/5 stars
Pitchfork	8.0/10
Q	4/5 stars
Record Collector	4/5 stars
Resident Advisor	4.3/5
Uncut	8/10

At Metacritic, which assigns a normalized rating out of 100 to reviews from critics, Screen Memories received an average score of 78 based on 19 reviews, indicating a "generally favorable" reception. AllMusic reviewer Marcy Donelson stated that the album succeeds by basking in its murky splendor," while Clash magazine honored its "all-consuming, oddball" nature, calling it "akin to a well-warranted display of authority from an artist that’s truly a master of his craft." Kevin Harley of Record Collector wrote that it "conveys Mau' confounding persona with total confidence: sometimes silly, sometimes stentorian, it gives the impression of a man in full command of his off-piste forays, rendering it fascinating even as it befuddles." Chal Ravens of Pitchfork called it "grander" and "balanced with a kind of playful absurdity—the sense of nihilistic abandon" that "strikes a chord in a way that most blatantly political albums never quite manage," and praised Maus' "sense of greater craftsmanship in the small details." Devaney, reviewing for Crack Magazine, called it "just as tragically captivating than ever before," reasoning, "There is a sense of lethargy throughout the record but it is greatly outweighed by striking moments of ethereal bliss along with the profound reflections of an isolated intellect."

The A.V. Club's Sean O'Neal praised the album's "undeniably hypnotic pull" and "haunting, churning synth lines rendered with impressive precision," but criticized its "stupid" and seemingly provocative lyrical content. Exclaim! reviewer Cole Firth described the songs as "so clearly laboured over and full of detail that their impact as a whole, coupled with bizarre and often-obfuscated lyrics, can easily wash over a first-time listener." No Ripcord felt Maus' perfectionist and academic method of songwriting led it to occasionally "lose[] its luster, especially during the second half," when "Maus can sometimes lose himself into his own abstract ideas." Under the Radar disliked that it didn't have as much "purpose and poise" as Pitiless Censors. Reviewing for PopMatters, Christopher Laird criticized Maus for what he perceived to be an intellectual demeanor in interviews despite "many of [the LP's] songs [being] so simple that they are nearly mantras, simple statements and riffs repeated ad nauseam."

== Track listing ==
All songs written, mixed, and produced by John Maus and mastered by Heba Kadry; additional writing on "Bombs Away" by Ariel Pink and Matt Fishbeck.

No.	Title	Length
1.	"The Combine"	3:38
2.	"Teenage Witch"	2:18
3.	"Touchdown"	3:41
4.	"Walls of Silence"	2:23
5.	"Find Out"	2:24
6.	"Decide Decide"	3:05
7.	"Edge of Forever"	2:43
8.	"The People Are Missing"	2:59
9.	"Pets"	3:36
10.	"Sensitive Recollections"	2:46
11.	"Over Phantom"	4:27
12.	"Bombs Away"	3:57
Total length:		37:57

== Release history ==
Region	Date	Format(s)	Label
Worldwide	October 27, 2017	CD; digital download; streaming; vinyl	Ribbon

== Charts ==
Chart (2017)	Peak position
US Heatseekers Albums (Billboard)	14

== Accolades ==
Publication	Accolade	Rank	Ref.
Clash	Albums of the Year 2017	22	
Crack Magazine	The Top 100 Albums of 2017	50	
Fact	The 50 Best Albums of 2017	49	
Gorilla vs. Bear	Albums of 2017	57	
Les Inrockuptibles	Best of Musique 2017	36	
Noisey	The 100 Best Albums of 2017	64	
Resident Advisor	2017's Best Albums	—	
Uncut	Best Releases of 2017	59	
The Wire	Best Releases of 2017	46	
