= Addendum (album) =

Studio album by John Maus
- Released: April 20, 2018
- Recorded: c. 2003–2016
- Label: Ribbon
- Producer: John Maus

John Maus chronology
Screen Memories (2017)	Addendum (2018)

Singles from Addendum
- 1. "Episode" Released: April 3, 2018; 2. "Running Man" Released: May 14, 2018

Addendum is the fifth studio album by American musician John Maus, released on April 20, 2018. It is a twelve-track collection that serves as an "addendum" to his previous album Screen Memories (2017). As Maus explained, "It was really more that I made an album, but then I realized I had two albums worth of stuff." Accordingly, the songs on Addendum were made in a more "carefree" manner than Screen Memories and are most resemblant of his usual style.

== Release ==
Professional ratings
Aggregate scores
Source	Rating
Album of the Year	71/100
AnyDecentMusic?	6.8/10
Metacritic	70/100
Review scores
Source	Rating
AllMusic	3.5/5 stars
Crack	7/10
The Line of Best Fit	7.5/10
The Music	3.5/5 stars
Pitchfork	7.4/10
PopMatters	6/10 stars
Q	3/5 stars
Soundblab	6/10
Spectrum Culture	3.5/5 stars
Uncut	7/10

Addendum was first issued as a bonus vinyl disc on a career retrospective box set. A standalone CD and digital release followed on May 18. At Metacritic, which assigns a normalized rating out of 100 to reviews from critics, Addendum received an average score of 70 based on 7 reviews, indicating a "generally favorable" reception.

Pitchfork reviewer Evan Rytlewski wrote, "Maus has made more profound and mysterious records, but never one that has taken this much delight in its own ridiculousness." Q magazine called it an "intriguing, if not quite essential, addition to the Maus canon."

== Track listing ==
All tracks are written by John Maus except "Privacy", by Ariel Pink, and "Drinking Song", by Oswald von Wolkenstein (originally titled "Her wiert uns dürstet also sere").

No.	Title	Length
1.	"Outer Space"	3:45
2.	"Dumpster Baby"	2:46
3.	"Episode"	3:49
4.	"Drinking Song"	1:08
5.	"Figured It Out"	2:50
6.	"Middle Ages"	2:42
7.	"Mind the Droves"	3:31
8.	"Privacy"	3:18
9.	"Running Man"	2:44
10.	"Second Death"	2:00
11.	"1987"	3:10
12.	"I Want to Live"	3:45

Notes

- "1987" and "I Want to Live" are newly mixed versions of tracks that originally appeared on the self-released album I Want to Live! (2003). Three additional tracks from I Want to Live! can be found on A Collection of Rarities and Previously Unreleased Material (2012).
