= A Man Alive =

Studio album by Thao & the Get Down Stay Down
- Released: March 4, 2016
- Studios: Tiny Telephone, San Francisco; Different Fur, San Francisco
- Genres: Alternative folk, experimental pop
- Label: Ribbon Music
- Producer: Merrill Garbus

Thao & the Get Down Stay Down chronology
We the Common (2013)	A Man Alive (2016)	Temple (2020)

Singles from A Man Alive
- 1. "Nobody Dies" Released: December 10, 2015

Professional ratings
Aggregate scores
Source	Rating
AnyDecentMusic?	7.4/10
Metacritic	80/100
Review scores
Source	Rating
AllMusic	4/5 stars
Consequence of Sound	B
Exclaim!	9/10
The Guardian	4/5 stars
Mojo	3/5 stars
Pitchfork	8.0/10
Q	4/5 stars
Spin	8/10
Uncut	8/10
Vice	A−

A Man Alive is the fourth studio album by alternative folk band Thao & The Get Down Stay Down, released on the Ribbon Music label in March 2016.

== Background ==
The subject matter of the album was inspired by Thao Nguyen's relationship with her estranged father, who "left when I was maybe 11 or 12, my parents split up. And so he kinda just floated away but you never knew when he would come back and you never knew when he would just leave."

"This record, you know a lot of that is me releasing whatever I have to and grieving in whatever way, and having a lot of anger and then trying to sort of move forward, to forgive," Nguyen says. "But then a few songs later, I could leave him for dead."

== Composition ==
The decision to pair personal subject matter with upbeat music was a conscious one, inspired by reactions to the band's live performances. "The most fulfilling parts of our live show, that we love the most and what the crowd seemed to love the most were beat and bass driven. I wanted to move away from chordally based songs, and I wanted to rely more heavily on the beat and the groove. We wanted to pay more tribute to hip-hop influences...Once I realized what this record would be about, then it was definitely a non-negotiable in that it would be fun to perform. You can’t be sad every night without fail."

According to Nguyen, the song "Meticulous Bird" is "about various abuses of power, sexual assault and abuse in particular. I wanted whoever to be able to scream 'I take my body back.'"

== Recording ==
The album is the second collaboration between Nguyen and producer Merrill Garbus, leader of the Tune-Yards project, following Garbus's work on Nguyen's 2011 Thao + Mirah album.

On their collaboration, Nguyen says "She was everything I needed her to be: a steward in support. I didn't want to put 'Millionaire' on the record because it felt too vulnerable, and she said, 'Are you fucking kidding? Of course we’re putting it on the record'—which is what I needed."

== Promotion ==
To promote A Man Alive, Nguyen and Garbus created a video with Funny or Die dissecting the making of the song "Astonished Man" which parodied a video made by The New York Times that featured Diplo and Skrillex, and Justin Bieber discussing the making of the Jack Ü song, "Where Are Ü Now."

== Accolades ==
Publication	Accolade	Year	Rank
Paste	The 50 Best Albums of 2016	2016	30

== Track listing ==
No.	Title	Length
1.	"Astonished Man"	3:30
2.	"Slash/Burn"	3:11
3.	"The Evening"	3:25
4.	"Departure"	3:26
5.	"Nobody Dies"	3:48
6.	"Guts"	4:05
7.	"Fool Forever"	3:08
8.	"Millionaire"	3:06
9.	"Meticulous Bird"	3:22
10.	"Give Me Peace"	2:59
11.	"Hand to God"	3:52
12.	"Endless Love"	3:48

== Personnel ==
Musicians

- Lynne Angel - drum samples, inspiration
- Merrill Garbus - bass, cabasa, clapping, farfisa organ, flute, producer, sampling, vocals, backing vocals
- Thao Nguyen - bass, clapping, composer, drum programming, drums, guitar, loops, mandolin, oscillator, percussion, telecaster, toy piano, univox, vocals
- Johanna Kunin - clapping, vocals, backing vocals
- Sami Perez - clapping, backing vocals
- Jason Slota - clapping, cowbell, drums, gamelan, percussion, shaker, tambourine
- Beau Sorenson - clapping, engineer, guitar, linn drum, loops, mixing, programming, sampling, sequencing
- Adam Thompson - audio manipulation, bass, casio, clapping, glockenspiel, guitar, polysynth, synthesizer, synthesizer bass
- Charlie Glenn - guitar, organ, piano, lapsteel

Production

- Naomi Clark - paintings
- Noah Cates - design
- Matt Colton - mastering
- Maria Kanevskaya - photography
- Kate Pruitt - art direction
