= Thao Nguyen =

American singer-songwriter (born 1984)

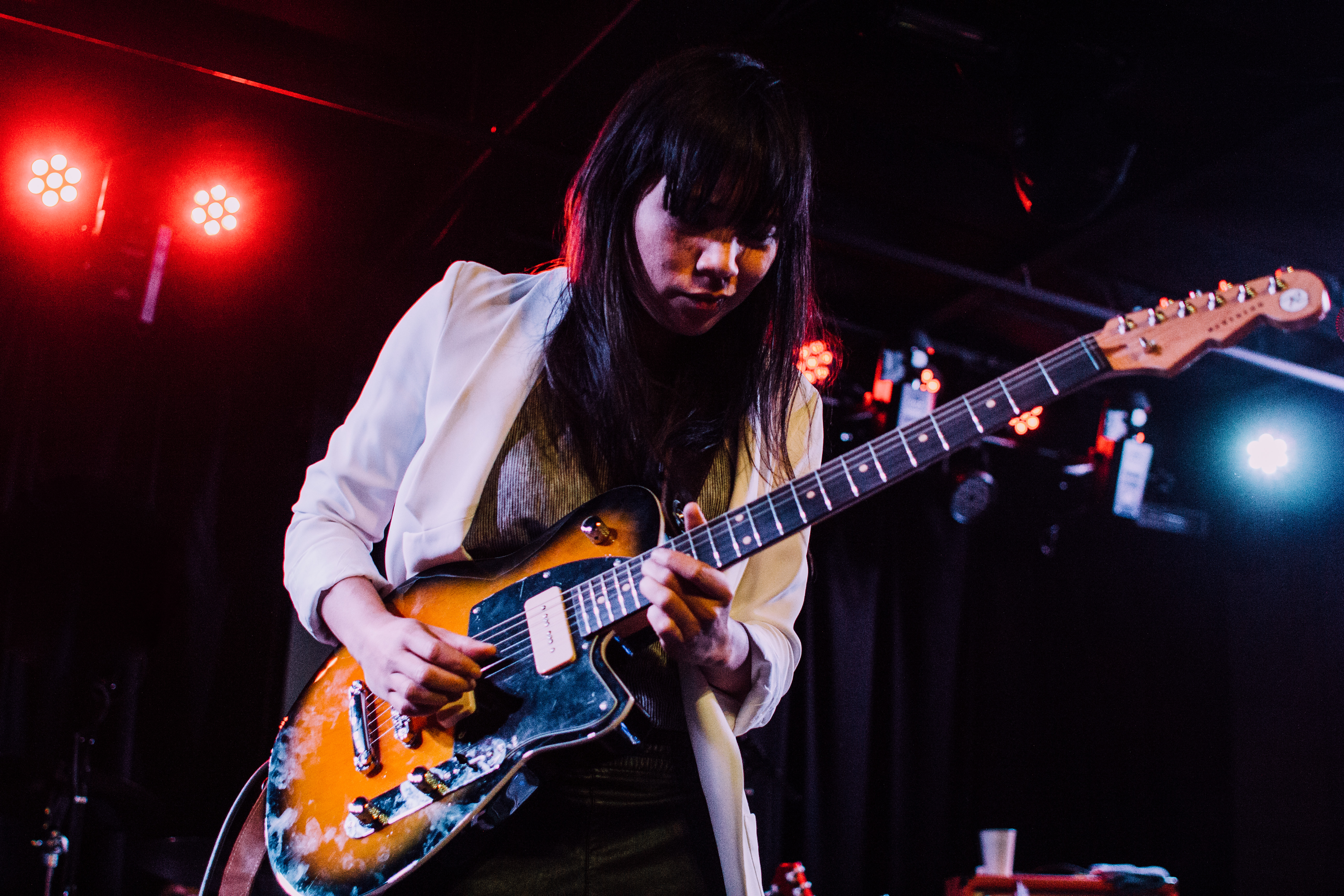
- Nguyen in 2016

Background information
- Also known as: Thao
- Born: March 19, 1984 (age 42); Virginia, U.S.
- Genres: Folk rock; indie folk; indie pop
- Occupations: Singer; songwriter
- Instruments: Vocals; guitar; bass; piano; drums; percussion; banjo; mandolin
- Years active: 2005–present
- Labels: Ribbon Music; Kill Rock Stars

Thao Nguyen (born March 19, 1984), (Note: Duncan states that she was 28 in 2013, while Miller states that she was 25 in 2009.) also known as Thao, is an American singer-songwriter originally from Virginia and now based in Oakland, California. She is the former lead singer, songwriter and figurehead of the defunct band Thao & the Get Down Stay Down, and has collaborated with Joanna Newsom and Andrew Bird. Outside of the band she has collaborated on projects with several artists including Merrill Garbus, The Portland Cello Project, and Mirah. Her music is influenced by folk, country, and hip hop.

== Career ==
=== Early life and education ===
Born in Virginia and raised in Falls Church, Nguyen began playing guitar and writing songs at the age of 12 while helping out at her mother's laundromat. Her parents are Vietnamese refugees who met when they were resettled in North Carolina. She describes her father as "incredibly charismatic and ... unreachable and tyrannical." Her father left when she was 11 or 12, about the time Nguyen started playing music. She began performing in high school as part of a pop-country duo with friend Brenna Clerkin. She attended Thomas Jefferson High School for Science and Technology in Fairfax County, Virginia, and studied at the College of William & Mary in Williamsburg, Virginia, where she double majored in sociology and women's studies. After recording an EP that differed from her initial style, she began performing as a soloist with her acoustic guitar. With her fellow college students Adam and Willis Thompson she formed Thao with the Get Down Stay Down. After graduating she toured extensively, both with the band and as a solo artist.

=== First albums and early collaborations ===
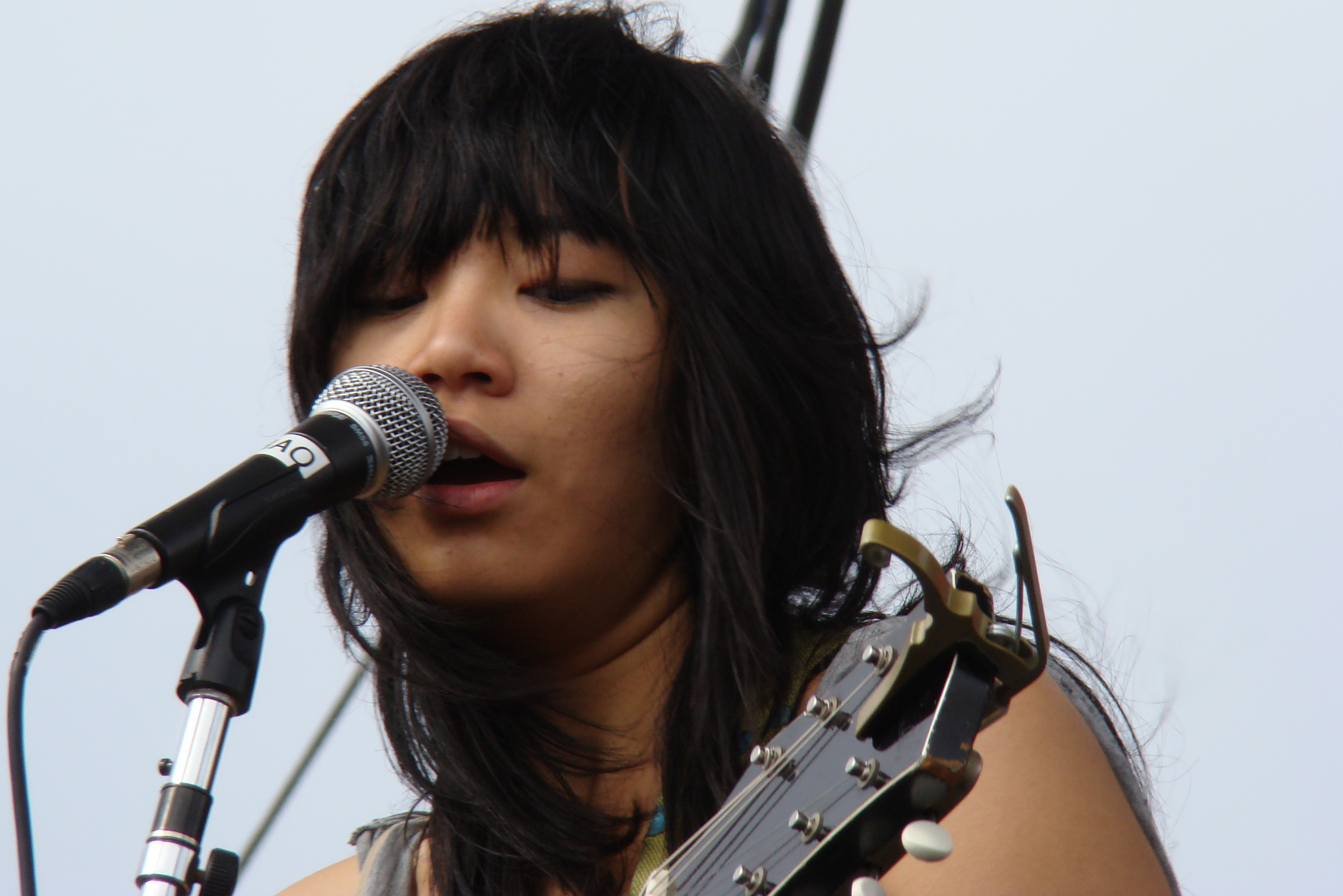
Nguyen playing with Thao & the Get Down Stay Down in 2008

Her first album, Like the Linen, was released in 2005 and led to a tour as a solo artist supporting Laura Veirs the following year. In 2007 she signed to the Kill Rock Stars label, releasing the Tucker Martine-produced We Brave Bee Stings and All album in 2008. In 2008 she duetted with Zach Rogue of Rogue Wave at the 'Revenge of the Book Eaters' benefit show in New York City.

In 2009, Nguyen appeared solo on the nationwide Hotel Cafe Tour. She collaborated with labelmates The Portland Cello Project and Justin Power on the album The Thao and Justin Power Sessions, released in June 2009 and featuring versions of Nguyen and Power's songs.

=== Move to San Francisco ===
Nguyen moved to San Francisco around 2009, and has been based there since. Over the next few years she began working with outreach projects including the non-profit organization the California Coalition for Women Prisoners, partly to help her to integrate with her new community.

=== Thao + Mirah ===
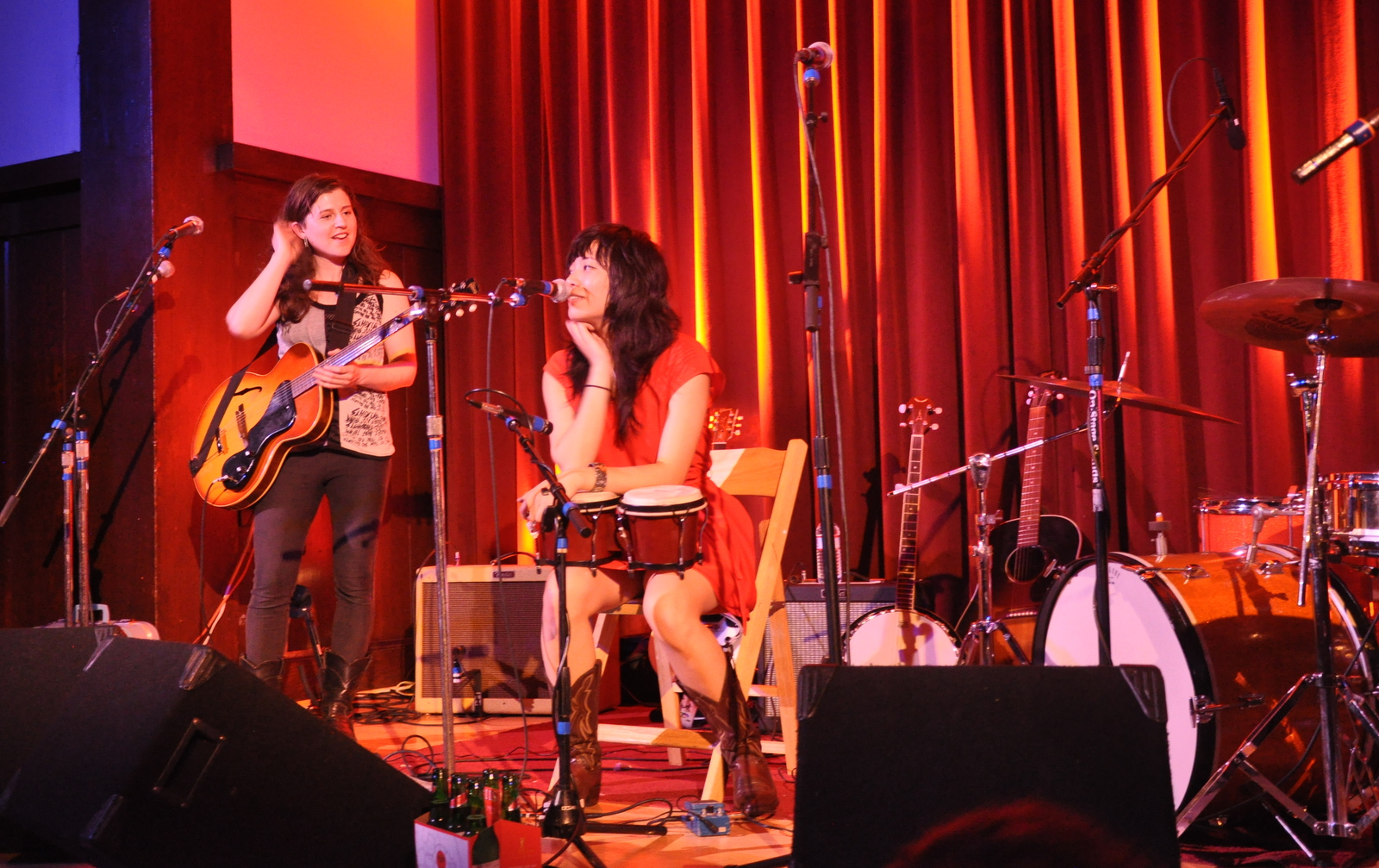
Nguyen onstage with singer-songwriter Mirah, holding bongos. Their collaborative album peaked at No. 7 on the Billboard 200.

In late 2009 Nguyen met Mirah and the two decided to collaborate. They performed together in early 2010 at the Noise Pop festival in San Francisco. The two later announced a 2010 North American tour, billed under the name Thao and Mirah with the Most of All. The album Thao + Mirah, co-produced by Merrill Garbus, was released in 2011 on Kill Rock Stars. The album allowed both artists to experiment with different instruments, with Nguyen playing banjo and percussion in addition to guitar.

=== 2010s ===
Nguyen has also raised funds with Dianna Agron for humanitarian organization Oxfam America. In May 2010, a video for the song "Body", directed by Agron, debuted on the website of Oxfam America. The video features a prelude of Thao and Dianna talking about their friendship, the making of the video, and their work on behalf of Oxfam.

The same year, Nguyen collaborated with Merrill Garbus of Tune-Yards as 'Merrillthaocracy' releasing the "Tuvalu" single as a part of the Fey 7-inch series.

Also in 2010, Nguyen's song "When We Swam" was used as the title song for the Australian TV show Offspring.

In 2012 Nguyen performed as part of WNYC's Radiolab show's 'Radiolab Live: In the Dark' tour. This self-described "nerd circus" also included Radiolab hosts Jad Abumrad and Robert Krulwich, comedian Demetri Martin, and modern dance troupe Pilobolus.

In 2013 an album with the Get Down Stay Down, We the Common, followed, the album's title track dedicated to one of the women she met on her prison visits.

Thao & the Get Down Stay Down released their fourth studio album, A Man Alive, on March 4, 2016. The highly personal album primarily explores Nguyen's relationship with her estranged father. The album was produced by Merrill Garbus, who also produced Thao and Mirah's collaborative album Thao + Mirah.

=== 2020s ===
On May 15, 2020, Thao & the Get Down Stay Down released their fifth album, Temple, Nguyen's first album since coming out publicly to the press as queer. The A.V. Club wrote that the album marks "the reconciliation of her queer identity and her Vietnamese culture with a 10-song set that similarly combines post-punk deconstruction with hi-fi grooves."

Thao self-released a two song ("Ambition" and "Relax/Rejoice") 7-inch titled The Get Free Set Free 7" to coincide with her September 2021 tour.

In October 2026 Thao released a new album titled "Show Me" as "THAO" on the label Kill Rock Stars.

== Musical style ==
Nguyen's voice has been compared with the voices of Cat Power, Fiona Apple, Sinéad O'Connor, and Regina Spektor. Her music has been described as "country-tinged indie folk-pop", and a blend of folk, country, blues and pop. Her lyrics deal with relationships and childhood and on We the Common more political themes, including the Occupy movement.

Nguyen describes herself as a fan of country music, blues, and Motown, and cites Lucinda Williams as a major influence.

== Nobody Dies ==
A 2017 documentary by Todd Krolczyk, Nobody Dies: A Film About a Musician Her Mom and Vietnam, follows Nguyen and her mother as they visit Vietnam—Nguyen for the first time, and her mother for the first time since the Vietnam War. Over the course of preparing for and during the journey, Nguyen explores the sometimes conflicting cultures, Vietnamese and American, that informed her childhood and helped to shape her family, her music, and her relationship with her mother. Funded by the Center for Asian American Media, the short film has also been broadcast by a number of PBS stations.

== Discography ==
=== Albums ===
- Like the Linen (2005), Trust Me
- We Brave Bee Stings and All (2008), Kill Rock Stars – Thao with the Get Down Stay Down
- Know Better Learn Faster (2009), Kill Rock Stars – Thao with the Get Down Stay Down
- The Thao & Justin Power Sessions (2009), Kill Rock Stars – with The Portland Cello Project
- Thao + Mirah (2011), Kill Rock Stars – with Mirah
- We the Common (2013), Ribbon Music – Thao & The Get Down Stay Down
- A Man Alive (2016), Ribbon Music – Thao & The Get Down Stay Down
- Temple (2020), Ribbon Music – Thao & The Get Down Stay Down
- Show Me (2026), Kill Rock Stars – Thao

=== Singles ===
- "The Get Free Set Free EP" (2021), self-released – as Thao
- "Swimming Pools" (2007), Kill Rock Stars – as Thao
- "Bag of Hammers" (2007), Kill Rock Stars – as Thao
- "Tuvalu" (2007), Common Cloud – with Merrill Garbus as Merrillthaocracy

=== Guest appearances ===
- Emancipator – "When I Go" from Soon It Will Be Cold Enough (2006)
- Simone White – "Never Be That Tough" from Silver, Silver (2012)
