= Thao & the Get Down Stay Down =

American folk rock band

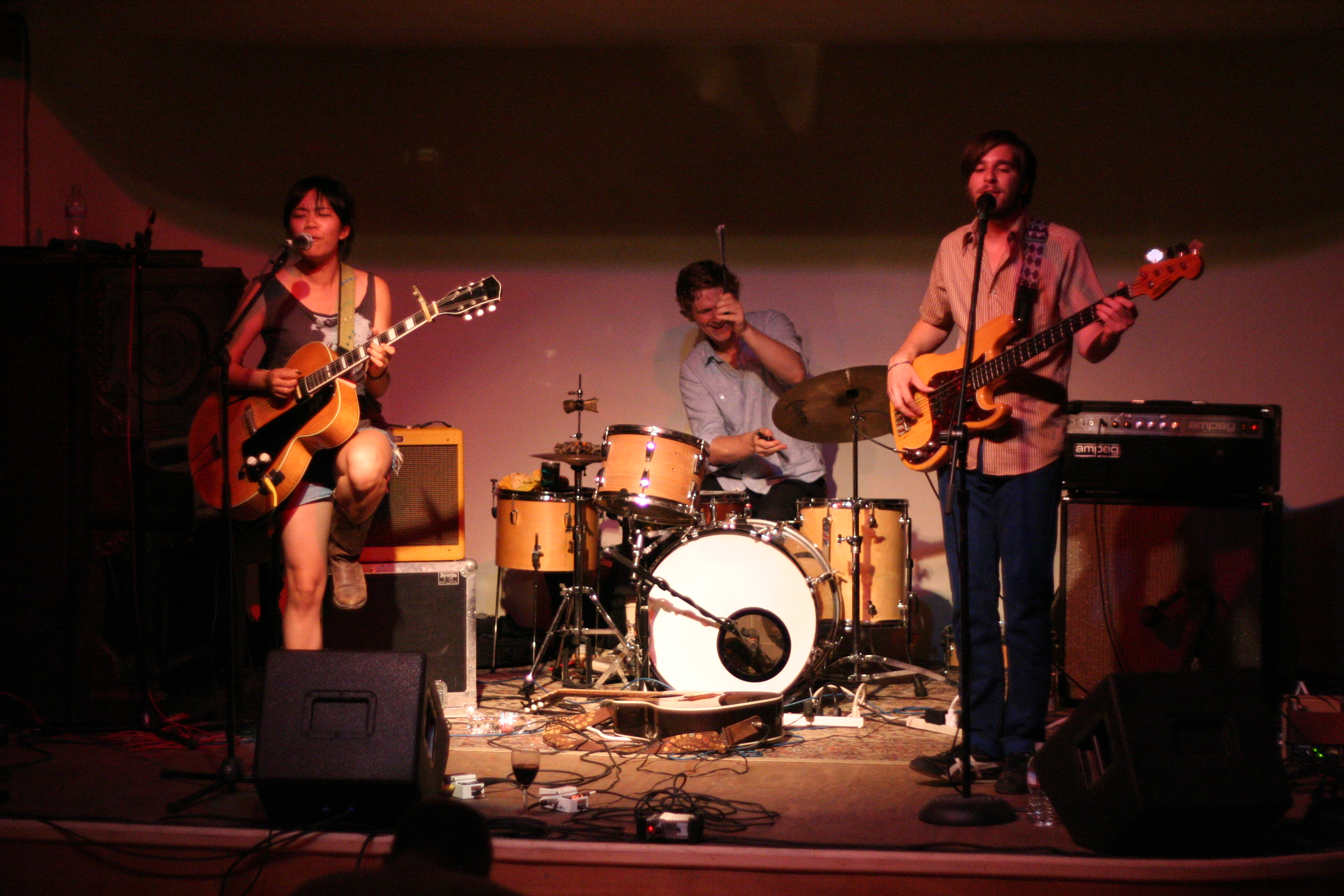
- Thao with The Get Down Stay Down & Horse Feathers Live in Portland, Oregon at The Woods 7/28/09

Background information
- Origin: Falls Church, Virginia, United States
- Genres: Folk rock, alternative rock, nu-disco
- Years active: 2003–2021
- Labels: Trust Me Corporation; Kill Rock Stars; Ribbon Music
- Past members: Thao Nguyen; Adam Thompson; Charlie Glenn; Jason Slota; Johanna Kunin; Willis Thompson; Frank Stewart
- Website: thaoandthegetdownstaydown.com

Thao & the Get Down Stay Down was an American alternative/folk rock group that originated in Falls Church, Virginia in 2003, before relocating to San Francisco, California. Its final lineup consisted of Thao Nguyen (lead vocals, guitar) and Adam Thompson (bass guitar, keyboards, backing vocals). Previous members of the project included Frank Stewart (lead guitar, production) and Willis Thompson (drums). The band released five studio albums: We Brave Bee Stings and All (2008), Know Better Learn Faster (2009), We the Common (2013), A Man Alive (2016) and Temple (2020).

== History ==
Thao Nguyen met drummer Willis Thompson while studying for her degrees in Sociology and Women's Studies at College of William & Mary. Willis Thompson was a member of Camp Tigerclaw, Acousticore, and Murphy's Kids. He is also a contributing member to the band The Light Footwork. Thao Nguyen and Willis Thompson met Adam Thompson (no relation) during a show at the Harrison Street Coffee Shop in Richmond, Virginia. At the time, Adam Thompson was performing as a solo jazz-influenced act under the moniker The OK Bird. Frank Stewart, member of the bands Durian and Verbal, would produce the first album Like the Linen in 2005 and join the band as a lead guitarist. Although only Willis and Nguyen initially performed live on tour, the four members began touring as a group during the Kill Rock Stars' Sound the Hare Heard tour during the summer of 2006. The name of the band was originally suggested by a former bassist of the band. Nguyen would expand the initial suggestion of "The Get Down" to "The Get Down Stay Down". During this period Thao Nguyen still occasionally performed as a soloist, including a European tour with Laura Veirs and the Tortured Souls in August 2006.

After sending Like the Linen to Laura Veirs, Thao connected with Tucker Martine, Veirs' drummer and producer for The Decemberists and Sufjan Stevens. In August 2006, the group began recording with Martine in Seattle and released the album, We Brave Bee Stings and All, in January 2008. Thao Nguyen has since moved to San Francisco, California. The band toured in 2008 with Xiu Xiu, and separately with Rilo Kiley before heading out on their first headlining tour that summer.

Thao & the Get Down Stay Down released their second album, Know Better Learn Faster, on October 13, 2009. Most of the album was written within a week, and Thao was joined by Andrew Bird on the title track. The band toured the US with The Portland Cello Project and David Shultz and the Skyline in late 2009, and spent time touring the US and Europe in Winter/Spring 2010.

In early 2010, Nguyen collaborated with Mirah, culminating in a collaborative album.

The band's track "When We Swam" is the opening theme for the Australian prime-time TV series Offspring (which premiered in Australia in August 2010).

The band also composed and performed the soundtrack for the 2011 film, American Teacher.

On October 25, 2012, Ribbon Music announced Nguyen signed with the label for the release of her new album entitled, We the Common, and unveiled the first single "Holy Roller" via YouTube. The album, released on February 5, 2013, features 12 tracks including a collaboration with indie singer Joanna Newsom on "Kindness Be Conceived", Nguyen and Newsom having met at a songwriters' retreat. This time around, she says, her album is "a lot less about my problems and more about how I could be a better participant in my life. There's a sense of revival and gratitude throughout the record that adds to this vitality of it." As part of the promotional tour for the album, Thao & the Get Down Stay Down joined the lineup of numerous music festivals, including 2013's South by Southwest and Outside Lands Music and Arts Festival.

In November 2013 the band released an EP, The Feeling Kind, which included cover versions of songs by Melanie, the Troggs, and Yo La Tengo.

Thao & the Get Down Stay Down released their fourth studio album, A Man Alive, on March 4, 2016. The album was produced by Merrill Garbus, who also produced Thao and Mirah's collaborative album, Thao + Mirah.

Thao & the Get Down Stay Down released their fifth album Temple, Nguyen's first album since coming out publicly to the press as queer. The A.V. Club wrote that the album marks "the reconciliation of her queer identity and her Vietnamese culture with a 10-song set that similarly combines post-punk deconstruction with hi-fi grooves."

On October 3, 2021, Nguyen announced via Instagram that the group was "dissolving," with her and Thompson "moving on to pursue other projects."

== Band members ==
Final line-up
- Thao Nguyen – lead vocals, rhythm guitar, banjo, piano (2003–2021)
- Adam Thompson – bass, piano, additional guitars (2003–2021)
- Charlie Glenn – lead guitar, piano (2010–2021)
- Jason Slota – drums (2010–2021)
- Johanna Kunin – piano, backing vocals (2014–2021)

Former members

- Willis Thompson – drums (2003–2010)
- Frank Stewart – lead guitar, piano (2005–2008)

== Discography ==
Albums

- We Brave Bee Stings and All (2008)
- Know Better Learn Faster (2009)
- We the Common (2013)
- A Man Alive (2016)
- Temple (2020)

EPs

- The Feeling Kind (2013), Ribbon Music

Singles

- "Bag of Hammers" from We Brave Bee Stings and All
- "Know Better Learn Faster" from Know Better Learn Faster
- "Holy Roller" from We the Common
- "The Feeling Kind" from We the Common
- "An Astonished Man" from A Man Alive
- "Temple" from Temple

Compilation contributions

- "Feet Asleep" – The Sound the Hare Heard (2006, Kill Rock Stars compilation disc)
- "Before You Vote" – 30 Days, 30 Songs (2006, digital release only)
- "Young Man" – Kill Rock Stars Winter Holiday Album (2006, Kill Rock Stars compilation, digital release only)

Collaborations

- Thao/The Thermals Record Store Day Split 7" (2009) EP split with the Thermals, released for Record Store Day – April 18, 2009
- The Thao and Justin Power Sessions (2009) with The Portland Cello Project
- Thao + Mirah (2011) LP with Mirah
