= Temple (album) =

Studio album by Thao & the Get Down Stay Down
- Released: May 15, 2020
- Genre: Alternative folk, experimental pop
- Length: 36:58
- Label: Ribbon Music
- Producer: Thao Nguyen & Adam Thompson

Thao & the Get Down Stay Down chronology
A Man Alive (2016)	Temple (2020)

Professional ratings
Aggregate scores
Source	Rating
AnyDecentMusic?	6.7/10
Metacritic	74/100
Review scores
Source	Rating
AllMusic	3.5/5 stars
Exclaim!	6/10
Uncut	7/10
Under the Radar	8/10

Temple is the fifth and final studio album by alternative folk band Thao & the Get Down Stay Down, released in May 2020. The album was mixed by Mikaelin Bluespruce and mastered by Heba Kadry.

The album's first single, "Phenom", was released with a music video created using Zoom and heralded as "the first great Zoom music video."

Thao stated that the album addresses "the reservations that my family had about me being out publicly." She added, "Fear has been such an unfortunate and large presence in my career and in my life... But I'm just so glad to be out from under that." Temple also features a strong hip hop influence.

== Track listing ==
1. "Temple" – 4:10
2. "Phenom" – 2:39
3. "Lion on the Hunt" – 3:14
4. "Pure Cinema" – 4:29
5. "Marauders" – 3:29
6. "How Could I" – 3:16
7. "Disclaim" – 3:12
8. "Rational Animal" – 4:19
9. "I've Got Something" – 4:41
10. "Marrow" – 3:29

== Personnel ==
- Thao Nguyen – vocals, songwriter, producer
- Adam Thompson – composer, producer
- Mikaelin "Blue" BlueSpruce – mixing
- Beau Sorenson – recording engineer, mixing (1)
- Heba Kadry – mastering
