= We the Common =

Studio album by Thao & the Get Down Stay Down
- Released: February 5, 2013
- Studios: Tiny Telephone, San Francisco
- Genre: Folk
- Length: 36:39
- Label: Ribbon Music
- Producer: John Congleton

Thao & the Get Down Stay Down chronology
Know Better Learn Faster (2009)	We the Common (2013)	A Man Alive (2016)

Singles from We the Common
- 1. "Holy Roller" Released: Oct 24, 2012; 2. "We The Common" Released: Jan 07, 2013

We the Common is an album by alternative folk band Thao & the Get Down Stay Down. It was released on February 5, 2013 on the Ribbon Music label.

Produced by John Congleton, the album features a guest appearances from Joanna Newsom on "Kindness Be Conceived".

== Background ==
After the 2009 album Know Better Learn Faster, Thao Nguyen took a break from touring and recording, and volunteered with local outreach projects in her new home of San Francisco. One of these projects was the California Coalition for Women Prisoners, an organization that advocates for healthcare and medical care. During these prison visits she met several women who were serving long sentences – one of them being Valerie Bolden who inspired the album's title track. Nguyen considers this outreach work as a major influence on her music and stated that it had "emotionally shaped" much of We the Common.

Nguyen stated of the album: "My intention from the beginning was to make an album full of songs that better captured the energy and hope and optimism of the collective and of one person in particular—myself—who wanted to be a part of that collective, and one who wanted to be more present in her own life and the lives of those she loved."

== Composition and recording ==
Valerie Bolden, who is currently serving a life sentence without parole for killing her abuser in self-defense, was the inspiration for the album's title track and the lyrics "All they wanted was a villain, a villain, and all they had was me." At the time of the album's release, Bolden has been incarcerated for seventeen years and has not seen her children in twelve years.

The song “City” was written as a tribute to Nguyen’s activist friends at the beginning of the Occupy movement. Nguyen explained in an interview with Mother Jones, “We were on tour at the time so I could check out these burgeoning hubs of activity, and we came home and I thought, ‘If I lay still through this, shame if I sleep tonight.’"

The song “Kindness Be Conceived,” featuring Joanna Newsom, had been written a month before Nguyen had met Newsom. "I wanted more of that old-time feel in the vocal harmonies. So when we met I shyly asked if she would demo. She did an amazing job, I’m so glad and grateful to have her on the record," explained Nguyen. The two had met at a songwriters' retreat at Hedgenrook.

== Promotion ==
To publicize the album, a series of short films were released, directed by Nguyen and Lauren Tabak. The short films included appearances by Ira Glass, John Hodgman and Merill Garbus of Tune-Yards.

== Reception ==
Professional ratings
Aggregate scores
Source	Rating
Metacritic	70/100
Review scores
Source	Rating
Allmusic	4/5 stars
Exclaim	(9/10)
NME	(6/10)
Paste Magazine	89/100
Pitchfork	(7.5/10.0)

The album received a largely positive critical reception. The SF Weekly described it as "socially conscious and brave, but...also a delight to listen to". PopMatters described it as having a "big-tent sound", with Arnold Pan stating "the way We the Common gets across its open-minded, open-hearted attitude is a real triumph". Allmusic gave the album a four star rating, with Fred Thomas commenting on the broader lyrical focus compared to earlier work, and viewing it as Nguyen's "most mature work and coincidentally some of her most enjoyable". The NME's Kevin Perry scored it 6/10, stating that there was "something sunkissed and wholesome" about it. Pitchfork Media's Lindsay Zoladz gave it 7.5 out of 10, calling it her "most sharply written record to date".

== Track listing ==
No.	Title	Length
1.	"We the Common (For Valerie Bolden)"	3:37
2.	"City"	2:34
3.	"We Don't Call"	2:59
4.	"The Feeling Kind"	3:34
5.	"Holy Roller"	2:36
6.	"Kindness Be Conceived (featuring Joanna Newsom)"	3:16
7.	"The Day Long"	3:21
8.	"Every Body"	2:42
9.	"Move"	3:15
10.	"Clouds for Brains"	2:58
11.	"Human Heart"	2:42
12.	"Age of Ice"	3:08

== Personnel ==
Thao and the Get Down Stay Down

- Charlie Glenn – guitar, harpsichord
- Thao Nguyen – banjo, composer, guitar, handclapping, mandolin, piano, vocals
- Adam Thompson – bass guitar, synthesizer, vocal arrangement, vocals

Additional musicians

- Paul Alexander – bass
- Jesse Cafiero – standup bass
- Ralph Carney – horn
- Kacey Johansing – vocals
- Darren Johnston – trumpet
- Jessie Ivry – cello
- Eric Kuhn – guitar
- Dina Maccabee – violin
- Andrew Maguire – percussion, vibraphone
- Joanna Newsom – harp, vocals
- Emily Ritz – vocals
- Rob Shelton – organ, piano
- Jason Slota – drums
- McKenzie Smith – drums
- Chad Stockslager – keyboards
- Mirah Yom Tov Zeitlyn – vocals

Technical personnel

- Robb Carmichael – package design
- John Congleton – engineer, mixing, producer
- Alan Douches – mastering
- Sergei Mikhailovich Prokudin-Gorskii – photography
- Jean Swetchine – photo courtesy
