= A Collection of Rarities and Previously Unreleased Material =

Compilation album by John Maus
- Released: July 17, 2012
- Recorded: 1999–2010
- Length: 44:43
- Label: Ribbon Music

John Maus chronology
We Must Become the Pitiless Censors of Ourselves (2011)	A Collection of Rarities and Previously Unreleased Material (2012)	Screen Memories (2017)

Professional ratings
Aggregate scores
Source	Rating
Metacritic	76/100
Review scores
Source	Rating
AllMusic	3.5/5 stars
NME	3/5 stars
Beats Per Minute	(84%)
Pitchfork	8.4/10
Drowned in Sound	7/10

A Collection of Rarities and Previously Unreleased Material is the first compilation album by American lo-fi musician John Maus, released on July 12, 2012. Spanning recordings from 1999 to 2010, the collection selects outtakes from his previous three albums in addition to tracks which had appeared on other compilations.

== Track listing ==
All tracks are written by John Maus. Next to the track titles are the years of recording that are labelled on the album credits.

No.	Title	Original release	Length
1.	"North Star" (2008)
2.	"The Law" (2003)	I Want to Live! (2003)
3.	"Castles in the Grave" (2010)
4.	"Angel of the Night" (2010)
5.	"Mental Breakdown" (2004)	I Want to Live! (2003)
6.	"Bennington" (2007)	Beaterblocker (2008)
7.	"Big Dumb Man" (2003)	Love Letters from Hell (2000)
8.	"No Title (Molly)" (2008)	Smugglers Way (2012)
9.	"Lost" (2003)
10.	"All Aboard" (2007)
11.	"This Is the Beat" (2005)	Mistletonia (2007)
12.	"My Hatred Is Magnificent" (2008)
13.	"The Fear" (2003)	I Want to Live! (2003)
14.	"Fish with Broken Dreams" (1999)	Snowless Winters EP (1999)
15.	"Rock the Bone" (2008)
16.	"I Don't Eat Human Beings" (2008)
Total length:			44:43

Note

- "Big Dumb Man" and "The Law" feature uncredited writing contributions from Ariel Pink.
