= Bobby (band) =

American musical project

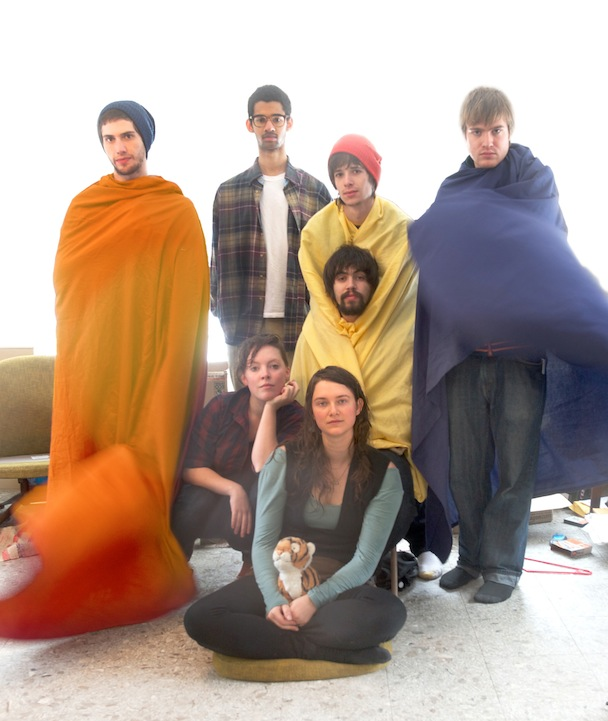

Background information
- Origin: Bennington College, Vermont
- Genres: Dream pop; psychedelic; folk; indie rock
- Years active: 2010–present
- Label: Partisan
- Members: Tom Greenberg; Molly Erin Sarle; Maia Friedman; Amelia Meath; Paolo Menuez; Julian Labat; Martin Zimmermann; Roby Moulton
- Website: partisanrecords.com/artists/bobby

Bobby is a cooperative musical project based on the talents of musicians from Partisan Records and Knitting Factory Records which is notable for achieving an avant garde alternative sound using polyrhythm as well as achieving critical acclaim before releasing their first album entitled Bobby. They signed a contract with Partisan Records in 2010.

== Beginnings ==
With the exception of Paolo Menuez––who attended Hampshire College––group members were students at Bennington College who moved into a remote house in western Massachusetts in the town of Montague. Tom Greenberg was the founder, according to several sources. Greenberg brought in musical friends including Martin Zimmermann, who had been heavily influenced by Bennington teacher and jazz percussionist Milford Graves. The group was a "loose collective" emerging from "a Broken Social Scene of Bennington College pals", according to one account, and as a "grab bag of college friends and label mates" by a second account.

The name Bobby does not describe an actual person but rather a fictional character who was a "wayward founding member" who never played with the band but whose "spirit lingers over the project." One account suggests Bobby was the name of a "bad dancer" who was the fictional friend of Tom Greenberg, and in the spring of 2010, Greenberg composed songs for his imaginary friend Bobby to dance to. After using the name Bobby, the group encountered book artist Keith Smith's 1985 publication "Bobby", which described an imaginary friend by the same name Bobby. Smith granted permission for the group Bobby to feature pieces of his book Bobby for their album artwork. One reviewer tried googling the word Bobby only to find it "un-Googleable" since it is not a unique name.

== Music ==
The group, until August 2011, was composed of seven musicians, some of whom were members of other bands, collaborating on experimental acoustic folk and synthesizer-based sounds. Some members, past and present, have worked with other established bands, including Molly Sarlé and Amelia Meath of Mountain Man. The music of Bobby has experimental rhythms in which multiple meters are superimposed on one another so that "each song can be felt in different time signatures." The group performs with numerous effects pedals, numerous synthesizers, and a Rhodes keyboard.

The group toured in eighteen cities in the United States in June 2011. In August 2011, the group reformed as a four-piece, introducing Maia Friedman on vocals and keyboards, while Moulton, Labat, Meath and Sarle left the group. In Fall 2011, Bobby toured with Wild Beasts, and later toured nationally with Little Scream. According to one report, the group was discovered by Tim Putnam of Partisan Records. The project released its debut album on Partisan Records on June 21, 2011. The group has performed with Thao + Mirah It performed in the South by Southwest (SXSW) festival in March 2011 in Austin, Texas.

== Reviews ==
The New York Times music critic Nate Chinen wrote that the band was "drowning in reverb" and that "almost every song felt blurred around the edges and muffled at the center." MVRemix described the album as "a lush, full spectrum exploration of frequency and timbrel layering" with "tender harmonies ... above rich textures." A reviewer described the music as "blissed-out, retreating into layers of dewy, droney guitar and fluttering modular synths." A review in Jazner described the music as having "mesmerizing melodies (which) leave listeners in a speechless state of ethereal bliss." Malcom Lacey described the group's song Sore Spores as "intimately catchy" and another described it as "soothing and psychedelic." An account in Visible Voice suggested their music was "hypnotic folk head trip" which was "dewey". An account in Entertainment Realm describes the group as "dreamy, eclectic, quirky". The track Groggy was described as a "best new track" by Pitchfork Magazine in March 2011. Reviewer Liz Jane in Consequence of Sound described the sound as "endearingly quirky" and had a "delicate balance between calm and eerie".

== Members ==
- Tom Greenberg – guitar, vocals, bandleader
- Molly Erin Sarle – vocals
- Maia Friedman – vocals, keyboards
- Amelia Meath – vocals
- Paolo Menuez – guitar, keyboards, vocals
- Julian Labat – bass, keyboards
- Martin Zimmermann – drums, keyboards, guitar
- Roby Moulton – keyboards, percussion

== Discography ==
- Bobby (June 21, 2011, Partisan Records)
