= Songs (John Maus album) =

Studio album by John Maus
- Released: June 27, 2006
- Recorded: 1999–2004
- Genre: Dark wave
- Length: 45:37
- Label: Upset the Rhythm
- Producer: John Maus

John Maus chronology
I Want to Live! (2003)	Songs (2006)	Love Is Real (2007)

Songs is the first official album by American lo-fi musician John Maus, released on June 27, 2006 by the British label Upset the Rhythm. The album was recorded over the course of five years. It consists of slightly remixed tracks that originally appeared on the self-released albums Snowless Winters EP (1999), Love Letters From Hell (2000), and I Want to Live! (2003).

== Reception ==
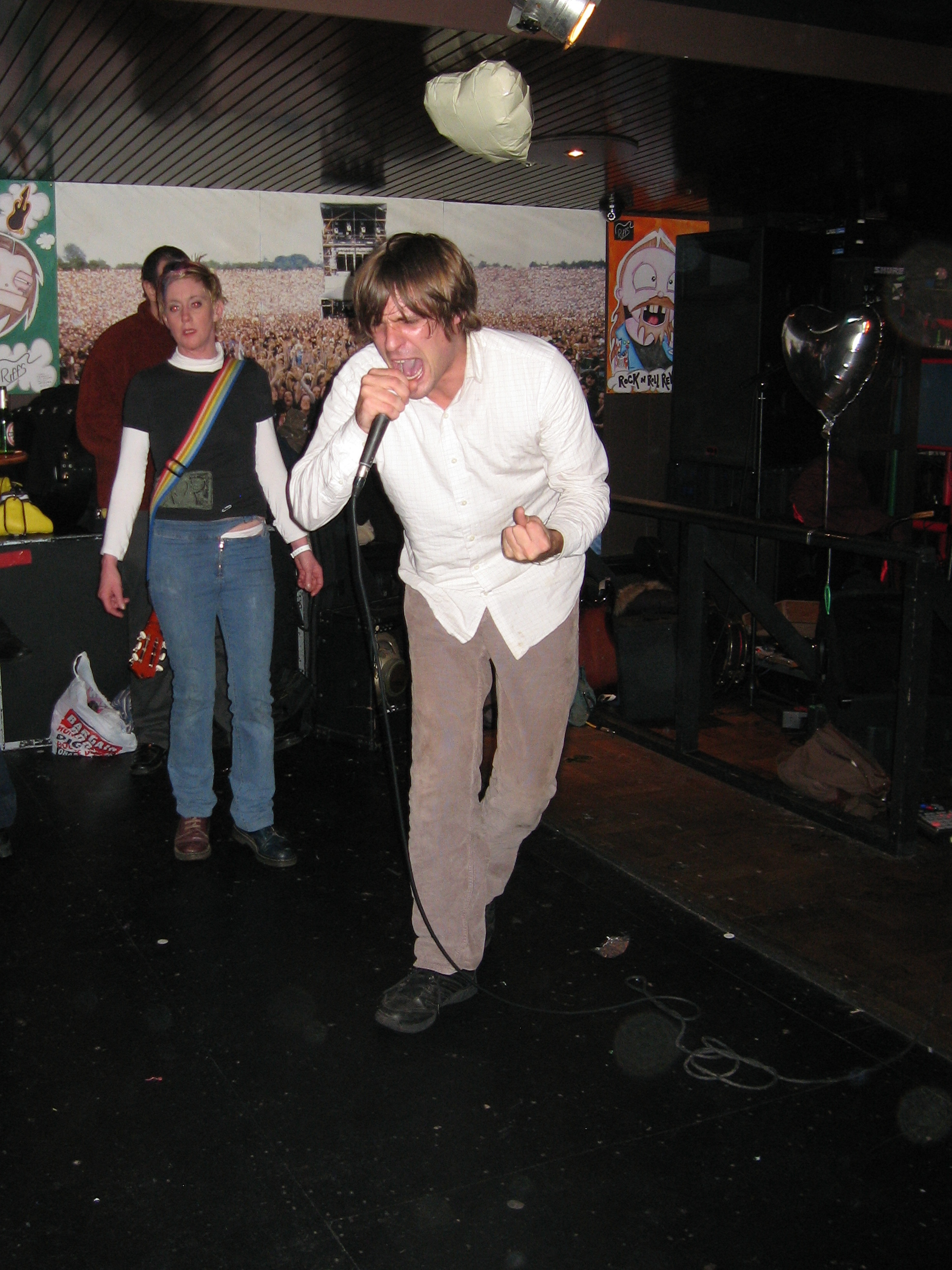
Maus performing in 2007

Upon release, the album generally drew negative reviews from critics. CMJ stated, "It took this Ariel Pink cohort five years to write and record his debut album, and only five minutes to become more annoying than Ariel Pink." Tiny Mix Tapes gave the LP a four-star review, in which they wrote that Maus's singing "is always an effortless balance between weird visceral descriptions, deadpan humor and the uncomfortably honest."

== Track listing ==
All tracks are written by John Maus.

No.	Title	Length
1.	"Opening"	1:09
2.	"Time to Die"	3:25
3.	"Don't Be a Body"	3:13
4.	"That Night"	1:13
5.	"Real Bad Job"	2:39
6.	"Forever and Ever and Ever" (featuring Ariel Pink)	4:16
7.	"Maniac"	3:35
8.	"Just Wait Till Next Year"	2:26
9.	"I'm Only Human"	2:42
10.	"Less Talk More Action"	1:46
11.	"Through the Skies for You"	3:05
12.	"Blowing in the Mind" (featuring Ariel Pink)	3:14
13.	"Of North of North Stars"	2:10
14.	"It Takes Time"	2:29
15.	"The Peace That Earth Cannot Give"	2:49
16.	"And Heaven Turned to Her Weeping"	5:25
Total length:		45:37

== See also ==
- Lover Boy
