= John Maus =

American musician

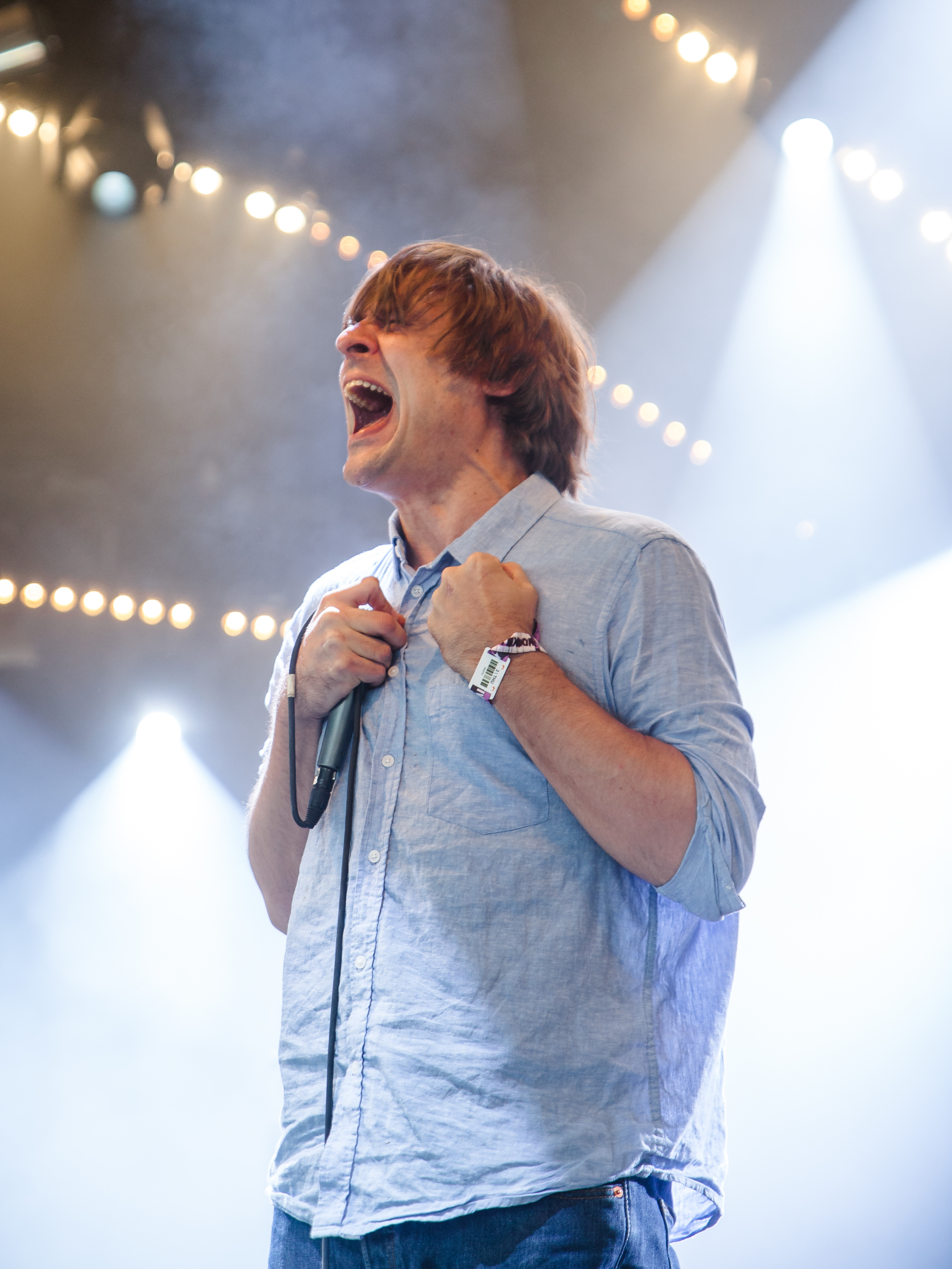
- Maus performing in Denmark, 2018
- Born: February 23, 1980 (age 46); Austin, Minnesota, U.S.
- Education: California Institute of the Arts (B.A.); European Graduate School (M.A.); University of Hawaiʻi (PhD)
- Occupations: Musician; singer; songwriter; composer; academic
- Years active: 1999–present
- Spouse: Kika Karadi (m. 2017)
- Musical career
- Origin: Los Angeles, California, U.S.
- Genres: Synth-pop; lo-fi; hypnagogic pop; post-punk; experimental pop
- Instruments: Keyboards; vocals; bass; guitar
- Labels: Young; Demonstration Bootleg Ltd.; Upset The Rhythm; Ribbon Music; Human Ear Music; Mistletone
- Formerly of: Ariel Pink's Haunted Graffiti
- Website: johnma.us

John Maus (born February 23, 1980) is an American composer, singer, and songwriter known for his baritone singing style and his use of vintage synthesizer sounds and medieval music church modes, a combination that often draws comparisons to 1980s goth-pop. His early lo-fi music recordings anticipated and inspired the late 2000s hypnagogic pop movement. On stage, he is characterized for his intense displays of emotion while performing. He is also a former teacher of philosophy at the University of Hawaiʻi, where he later earned his PhD in political science.

Maus' early influences included Nirvana, Syd Barrett, Jim Morrison, and composers of the medieval music, Renaissance music, and Baroque music eras. In 1998, he left his hometown of Austin, Minnesota to study experimental music at the California Institute of the Arts. When he befriended and first worked alongside classmate Ariel Pink, he took a greater interest in pop music. He produced most of the music from his first two albums Songs (2006) and Love Is Real (2007) on cassette tape with an early 1990s sound bank. The albums generally drew negative reviews upon release, and it was not until the success of his third, We Must Become the Pitiless Censors of Ourselves (2011), that he became more widely accepted as an outsider music artist. Following a five-year absence from public appearances and releasing new music, he returned with the albums Screen Memories in 2017, and Addendum in 2018. His sixth studio album, Later Than You Think, was released in September 2025.

Writings about Maus frequently link his music to his academic vocations, although Maus himself denies composing with an aesthetic or political theory in mind. He says that on some of his songs, his intention is to investigate "forgotten" electronic palettes, harmonies that were historically associated with "the divine", and lyrics that follow certain social idioms to their "absurd conclusions". His dissertation, "Communication and Control" (2014), discusses the influence of technology on social control.

== Biography ==
=== Early years ===
Maus was born and raised in Austin, Minnesota and had what he described as a "spoiled ass" upbringing. The earliest songs he could recall hearing was "Chariots of Fire" by Vangelis, and after that, early MTV hits such as Starship's "We Built This City" (1985). As a teenager, he listened mainly to Nirvana and Syd Barrett, performed in punk bands, and created music with his computer. He said that he began playing an instrument "around 12 or 13" and remembered that "the [only] culture I was exposed to was what was coming through MTV, Top 40 radio and maybe a classic rock station or something like that. ... I lived out in a very small town, with no boutique record stores and no college kids." Nirvana's "Smells Like Teen Spirit" created "a fascination for musical details" for him, and when he got his first bass guitar, "I didn’t take any lessons or learn how to play it. I’d just kind of pluck on the bass and scream my heart out." Afterward, he became fascinated with the life and music of Syd Barrett, and recorded his own version of Barrett's 1970 song "Feel" from The Madcap Laughs.

In 1998, Maus began his undergraduate in music composition at the California Institute of the Arts, by which time he had formed an appreciation for experimental music, such as the work of Michael Pisaro, as well as medieval music, Renaissance music and Baroque music. When he befriended and began to work alongside classmate Ariel Pink (Ariel Rosenberg), he took a greater interest in pop music. The first time he heard Rosenberg play was at a concert put up by students from the visual arts department. He recalled thinking: "You know, Okay, maybe I’m not going to do experimental music anymore, because I was ... doing all of these performances like [Morton] Feldman and [John] Cage. ... I left that aside and took up pop as the best bet, largely because of my encounter there with Ariel, and the early work he was doing." Rosenberg called Maus "arguably my best friend" and "my very first fan", and in turn, Maus called him "the zeitgeist embodied. He is the figure of this situation and of this time, of the cloud, of the spectacle gone online."

After Maus and Rosenberg became roommates, Maus recorded the material from his first album using a cassette multi-track recorder and an early 1990s synthesizer soundbank. For a time, Maus was a member of the Haunted Graffiti stage band. They collaborated on the title track of Rosenberg's Lover Boy (2002). Maus said that Rosenberg made contributions to some of his own songs, but was not credited "because neither of us care enough about any 'official' credit." He later completed his degree in experimental music composition in 2003. By 2005, Maus had also taken about a year in "art criticism or something". For two of his college years, he "couldn't write a thing ... and it horrified me. ... Nothing did what I felt music ought to do. I had to feel like I'd started to get there, at least in my mind, before I could share it with people." At his most "prolific", he could write only one song a month.

=== Label signing ===
It took this Ariel Pink cohort five years to write and record his debut album, and only five minutes to become more annoying than Ariel Pink.

— CMJ review of Songs, 2006

In 2003, Rosenberg signed to Animal Collective's Paw Tracks, and over the next few years, some of his early, self-released CD-Rs were widely distributed for the first time. Maus had also self-released CD-Rs of his work, which he submitted to several labels, including Paw Tracks and Kill Rock Stars, but was rejected. Both Maus and Rosenberg backed Animal Collective's Panda Bear for his solo tour of Europe, where Maus served as keyboardist. (Note: After he showed Lennox Guillaume de Machaut's "Rose, Lis, Printemps, Verdure", Lennox went on to sample the piece for "I'm Not" on Person Pitch (2007).) Sometimes Maus was also the opening act for these shows. Eventually, after a performance in London, he encountered agents from Upset the Rhythm, who agreed to distribute his music. Although Maus' first two official albums Songs (2006) and Love Is Real (2007) generally drew negative reviews upon release, he gradually built a cult following.

After Love Is Real, Maus was awarded a scholarship to study political philosophy at the University of Hawaiʻi, where he had a day job as a lecturer. In the evenings, he continued working on music from his office. In 2009, Maus relocated from Hawaii to a secluded cabin in Minnesota, where he struggled to write material for a third album. He said that he eventually gave up, and instead began "doing lots of chemistry projects and chromatography experiments. I set myself on fire a few times heating inflammable solvents." Meanwhile, he continued his studies at the European Graduate School in Saas Fee, Switzerland and earned his master's degree. He did not live in Switzerland, "but would go out there in the summers. It's like that Black Mountain thing that they did over here years ago, where they bring out all of the heavy hitters and you can study with them yourself."

One of his professors from the university was the French philosopher Alain Badiou, who would originate the title of his third album We Must Become the Pitiless Censors of Ourselves (2011). Maus wrote the album in "search for the perfect pop song." After the album's positive response, he grew more widely accepted as an outsider music artist, and there was a critical reevaluation of his earlier work. In 2012, the album was followed with the compilation A Collection of Rarities and Previously Unreleased Material. Spanning recordings from 1999 to 2010, the collection selects outtakes from his previous three albums in addition to tracks which had appeared on other compilations. The album was conceived by Ribbon Music; Maus did not consider it an "official record" but was "grateful that they [the label] thought anybody would be interested in having it."

In a 2011 Pitchfork interview, Maus suggested that he was happy that music was increasingly becoming free to the public and that record stores were "coming to an end". The remarks embroiled him in an online controversy, after which he tweeted a lengthy apology which clarified that he was referring to "the Megastores of the world", not "the small DIY record shops".

=== 2012–present ===
Maus envisioned that after he completed his PhD dissertation, he would return to teaching, stating in 2011 that he could not foresee a career in music. At the same time, he started experimenting with recreational drugs for the first time in his life, "going into sensory deprivation tanks and just trying any trick I could think of. I became solely obsessed with this at the expense of anything else." From 2012 to 2016, he did not release any new music, and spent the majority of the time in isolation. Two years were devoted to finishing his dissertation, while another two were spent learning how to build modular synthesizers. Completed and submitted in 2014, the 338-page thesis "Communication and Control" discussed the influence of technology on social control, and he was thereby awarded his PhD in political science from the University of Hawaiʻi, where his thesis advisor was Michael J. Shapiro. He immediately started building the instruments that were ultimately used for the recording of his next album. At least two albums' worth of tracks were finished shortly before the end of 2016.

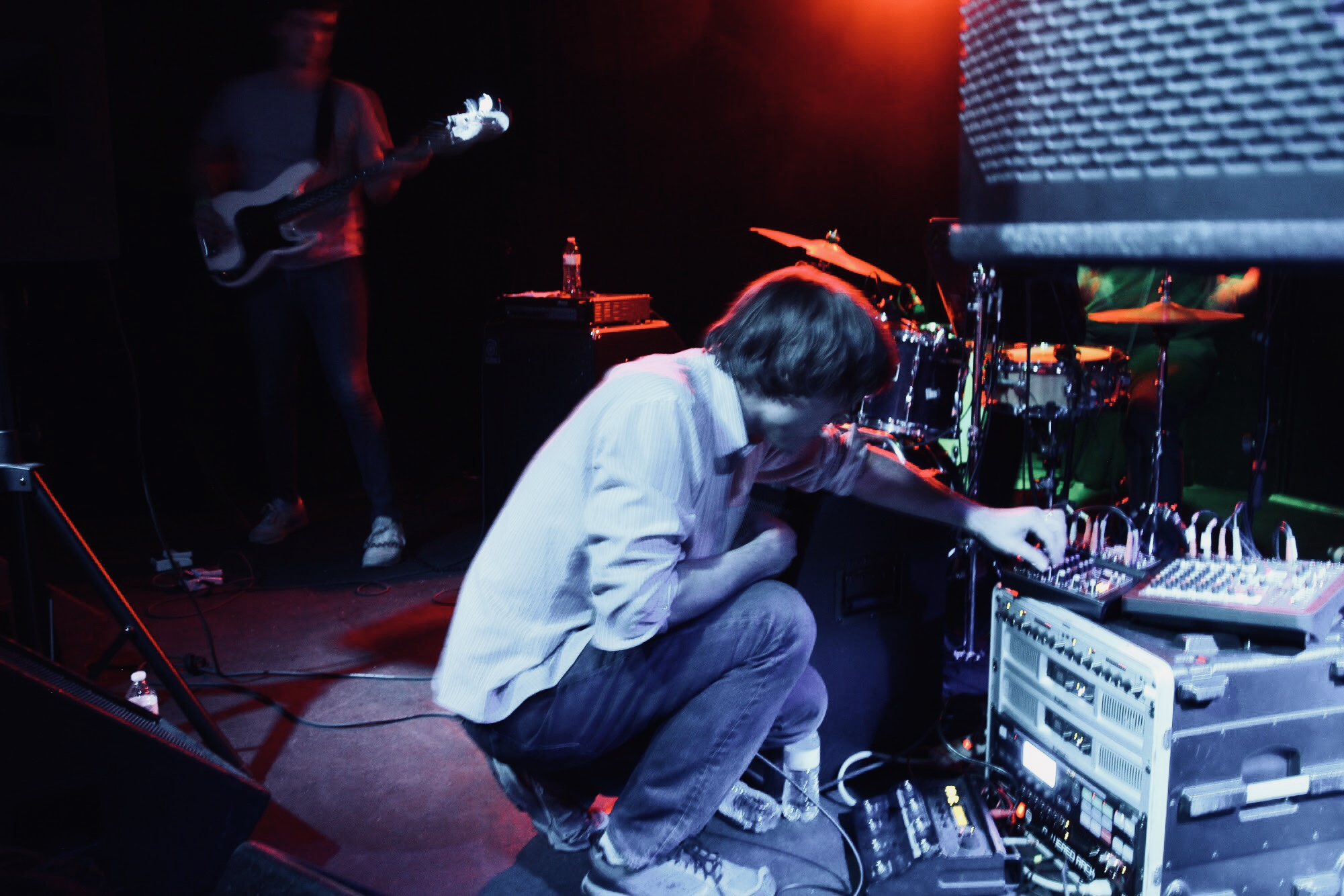
John Maus performing with his brother Joe (left) in Colorado, January 2018

His fourth official album, Screen Memories, was released on October 27, 2017. It was followed by Addendum on April 20, 2018. In an October 2017 interview, Maus indicated a desire to record an album with Rosenberg: "We’re both swamped right now ... but I've been talking about it for a long time, and he's been talking about it. It’s just a question of finding the right moment, which I think will be after this." To support Screen Memories and Addendum, he embarked on his first solo tour with a live band, featuring his brother Joe Maus on bass, Minneapolis musician Luke Darger on keyboards, and Jonathan Thompson on drums. The tour began on August 15, 2017 and lasted until the next year. On July 28, 2018, Joe Maus died hours before a planned show at the annual Cēsis Art Festival in Latvia. His obituary stated that the cause was a "previously undiagnosed heart condition". The remaining dates were immediately cancelled. Later in the year, Maus resumed touring without his backing band.

Since then, Maus has played occasional gigs, including a November 2021 performance at the music festival Substance in Los Angeles. Maus had invited Ariel Pink to be his sound engineer for this performance; however, one of the festival promoters recommended against this out of fear of controversy. According to Pink, Maus, who would have protested out of principle, went ahead with the performance due to financial troubles. Pink recalled, "I said, I’ll pay you the money. I know they’re not paying you that much." He and Maus have not spoken since.

In July 2023, George Clanton's ElectroniCON 2023 music festival removed Maus from their line up following complaints on social media and from other scheduled performers. Maus donated his cancellation fee to social justice charities (Hope Not Hate & The Trevor Project) and, in a subsequent statement, apologized for unintentionally making "the ElectroniCON artists & fans feel unsafe". In 2024, Maus completed a sold out European tour consisting of 43 dates. In June 2025, Maus announced his sixth studio album Later Than You Think, set for release on September 26 of that year, and also announced the 'American Pilgrimage' tour.

== Style and philosophy ==
=== Performances and rhetoric ===
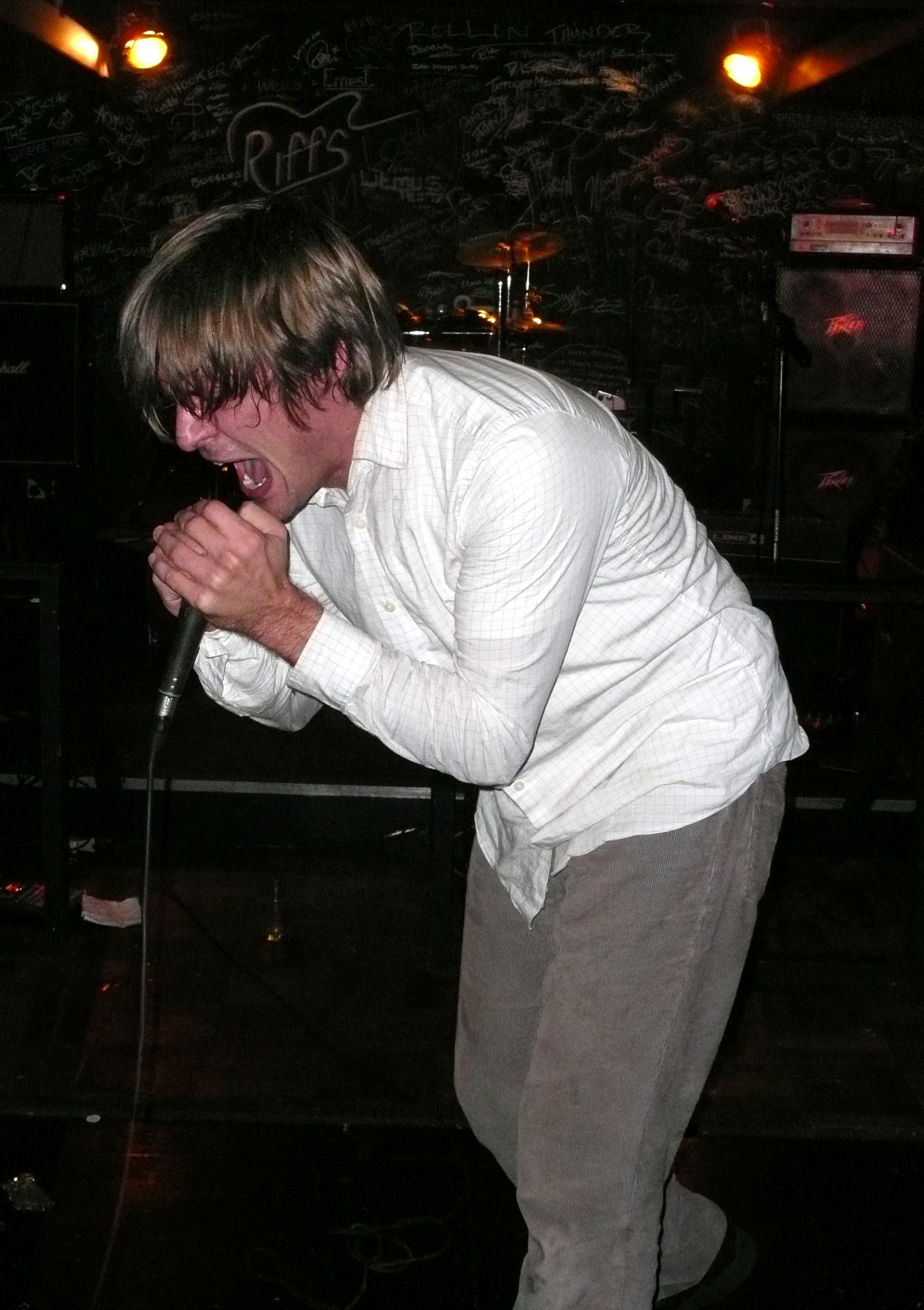
Maus at one of his early "karaoke" performances, 2007

On stage, Maus is known for his intense displays of emotion while performing. The Guardian noted him as a "ferocious theoretician" who "pogos, head-bangs and gives vent to a succession of feral howls as he jack-knifes at the waist." Until 2017, he only performed one-man "karaoke shows" in which he sang over prerecorded music. He is also characterized "as much a professional existentialist as he is a synth-pop musician" and that "reading his interviews can make your cerebral cortex pulse with befuddlement." The BBC's Charles Ubaghs distinguished Maus as "a serious believer in pop music. ... Behind these retro overtones is a desire to explore our modern relationships with pop, and its impact on our wider philosophical and cultural lives." The review also remarked that on Maus' self-referential tendencies: "Couple this with lyrics like The Fear’s surprisingly frank 'What’s wrong with me, 'cause I’ve tried everything,' and you’ve an accessibly rich portrait of Maus' ever-questioning mind."

Maus relates his erratic stage demeanor to "the hysterical body". Accordingly, the purpose of the display is to combat the "play-acting" involved with live music and affect more sincerity in the performance. This ties in with the idea meant by "we must become the pitiless censors of ourselves". As he explains, "What I'm trying to do is appear as something else than the world as it stands ... Because I believe that's what we all really want, to see one another and to be seen, and my particular wager is that the hysterical body is perhaps exemplary in its affirmation of that ... the sweat of blood is undeniable."

In various interviews, Maus advocates for "truth" in music. He refers to a tendency of popular music criticism, specifically its reductive engagement with "at-hand genre and at-hand comparison, then it moves on to the next thing. If something remarkable is happening in the work, that’s what people should write about, not the application of some at-hand label maker." (Note: Flavorwire's Tom Hawking argued that "he's an interesting case because his music doesn’t necessarily discuss the ideas that seem to inform it" unless one considers that the "relative simplicity of his songs, both lyrically and musically, is a way of getting at fundamental truths." Similarly, Jordan Redmond of Tiny Mix Tapes wrote that Maus "bristles at the sort of obfuscated discourse often created and upheld by, as he would have it, the sophisticated and exclusionary contemporary art world," and that rather than aspiring to be "anti-intellectual," his music only means to be accessible. When discussing, Maus suggests that they "are ridiculous. It's not 1920. That's not what's going on right now. We live in a completely different situation that, musically, is pop music.") Another example he gives to describe the reduction is "it sounds like x and y". He adds that the "truth content of any work, I suppose, is the extent to which it accomplishes something else than what it is."

Slant Magazine's Matthew Cole dismissed Maus' philosophical writings as "a parody of post-structuralist social theory" and his music as "obviously some kind of art-school mindfuckery". According to Maus, he does not think about aesthetic theory when "working over the keyboard, or musing over musical ideas in my head. But when discussing it, we want to have some new thought about this new music. I wouldn't claim that my music is new, but generally speaking pop music begs for some kind of radical new way of talking about it." He also denies any intention for his work to come off as "a sneering take on pop."

In September of 2026, Maus began publishing writings on music and philosophy via Substack newsletter.

=== Retro sound ===
[P]eople talk about [me sounding] like the eighties, [but] I didn't listen to the eighties! ... the whole "eighties" to me was something that comes from listening to Ariel Pink, like "Young Pilot Astray", The Doldrums and this kind of stuff. That was the first I heard a sound like that and wanted to take it up myself.

— John Maus

Although he rejects the label, Maus is recognized as a progenitor of the hypnagogic pop scene, a genre noted for its reliance on memory and nostalgia. His compositions tend to employ the use of particular modal scales previously associated with Renaissance and medieval music, which he believes is often mistaken as an attempt to evoke the 1980s. The intention, he said, was not "to evoke that time, I just hear that sound and it seems to suit this time right now. ... People associate the kind of harmonies that associate from the modes with the 80s sound, and for me it's not about the 80s, it's about what I think the kind of harmony is that arises from these modes - what I'm interested in." He adds: "For whatever reason, the pioneers of electronic music that came out of Sheffield and Manchester in the 1980s became interested in these ecclesiastical modes that, historically, were associated with the divine. ... The palette was there in the 80s so why was it set aside and forgotten? That thread can be taken up again." He goes on to opine that synthesizers and waveforms offer more "color and possibility" than the guitar, which he feels is an "exhausted" instrument.

His baritone singing style is often compared to Ian Curtis of Joy Division. Maus responded that he was not aware of Joy Division until much later in his life and that any similarities are likely due to Curtis sharing "the same heroes as me, like Jim Morrison."

During Maus' hiatus in the 2010s, various contingents of popular music began indulging in throwbacks to 1980s culture. Maus acknowledged that his early albums may have anticipated this development. Commenting on vaporwave: "even if I said it wasn’t always about retro, I had maybe tried to do that very thing and dropped a thread there for people to pick up on."

=== Political views ===
In a 2017 interview, Maus placed himself "left of left of left of left" on a political spectrum. He stated that "it comes down to, if you don't have a sort of indignance when you see atrocities committed, you're not communing with the same humanity that I am." Furthermore, in response to accusations of association with alt-right figures, he condemned white supremacy as a "cult of a race and blood—that's an absolute obscenity. That's nothing other than disaster. That's just inarguably obscene, that sort of ideology."

While some of his lyrics are reminiscent of political slogans, such as "Rights for Gays", he commented that his intention was to follow some social idioms "through to [their] absurd conclusions where interesting things are more likely to happen. That's when the politics of aesthetics [comes in]; it's not in the protest lyrics." On the song "Cop Killer", he explained, "I'm not talking about shooting or killing a human being, I'm talking about ... the cops in our heads, the cops that are everything other than us, everything inhuman, that would put us to work towards an end other than each other."

Asked about current events in a 2018 interview, Maus criticized the American left-wing as inferior to its European counterpart, saying that the former advances "ideas that are so quaint and old fashioned and inadequate to our situation. You know, asking for more rights, and individual liberty, I mean what is this? 1776?" He added that the Occupy Wall Street movement was "the closest" he had ever aligned with contemporary American politics and that there had been a growing hysteria to "call somebody alt right or something but there has been a far left critique of identity politics in as much as it plays the game of identity and identity is always something that can be put to work by the mechanisms that serve only toward anyone other than us y'know?"

==== Views on Donald Trump ====
In January 2021, Maus, alongside Ariel Pink, attended the pro-Donald Trump protests that led to the storming of the U.S. Capitol in Washington D.C. Responding to controversy regarding his presence at the event, Maus tweeted a quote from Mit brennender Sorge, a 1937 encyclical from Pope Pius XI distributed privately among clergy, that condemned aspects of nazism, does not mention National Socialism, Hitler or the Nazi Party itself—but obliquely references them. On 23 December 2021, Pink later appeared on alt-right podcast Wrong Opinion, discussing with host Josh Lekach that he was working closely with Maus on music and merchandise, saying "John is one thousand and one percent on Team Trump".

After a fan requested further explanation, he replied with an image of Edith Stein, a German-Jewish philosopher and Catholic nun who was executed at Auschwitz II-Birkenau by Nazis in 1942. Maus also stated that he responded directly to people who had messaged him stating that he was at the event for a joke.

On March 27, 2025, Maus spoke about his involvement in January 6, 2021 riots, on the Forms Podcast, claiming that he, his wife and Ariel were invited by filmmaker Alex Lee Moyer to Washington, D.C. as he and Ariel Pink were going to score the music for the film TFW No GF. He stated that when they were in their hotel, in D.C., Moyer stated that something was occurring at the Capitol and invited Maus and his wife to go down and get shots with Moyer and her cameraman, where they witnessed people climbing the wall and then went back to their hotel, stating that Ariel was not present at the event.

Maus stated that later that night after news of the killing of Ashli Babbitt, people started to question why Maus was present at the event, so "with burning concern" he posted the Pope Pius XI encyclical, "mistakenly thinking, you know, that the paragraphs condemning the exhultation and divinization of race and blood and nation were clear enough about where I stood". Maus also stated that he tried to respond individually to some DMs stating that he did not support it, but that looking back at the event thought that he was not clear enough and did not do enough to rebuff the allegations.

Maus responded to his removal from the 2023 ElectroniCON at the Knockdown Center in New York. He stated that he had been dropped due to "other artists not wanting to share a stage with a nazi", but responded saying "Good, I wouldn't want that either, you know what I mean?". Maus stated that although he felt he should have been clearer and should have done more, he was angry that people supposed him to be a fascist because of the subject matter of his songs, he felt was self-evidently leftist in nature. Maus also discussed faith and Christian belief in the podcast, expressing along with the host his feeling that the right-wing had co-opted Christianity, referring to the right-wing "cult of race and blood and family", and opposing what he saw as outright fabrications and opposition to truth.

In an interview conducted in 2025, Maus explained that during the 2020 United States presidential election, he made donations first to the campaign of Bernie Sanders, and then to the campaign of Donald Trump, due to his belief that "the Democrats conspired on Super Tuesday to make sure Bernie didn’t get the nomination, just like they did in 2016."

== Personal life ==
According to Maus in 2010, he had been diagnosed "with everything at one point or another. They say you're bipolar or whatever, but I've never had one of those ... euphoric, manic episodes where I had an exaggerated perception of my own ability, that would be wonderful. But no, I guess depression, or stuff like that." When asked if he had autism, he responded: "No, no, no, no, I only… I don't put much stock in those clinical categorizations in general, I suppose."

In 2017, Maus married Hungarian visual artist Kika Karadi. He is Catholic.

== Discography ==
John Maus discography
- Studio albums: 6
- Compilation albums: 1

Official studio albums

Title	Release
Songs	Released: March 20, 2006; Label: Upset the Rhythm
Love Is Real	Released: November 19, 2007; Label: Upset the Rhythm
We Must Become the Pitiless Censors of Ourselves	Released: June 27, 2011; Label: Ribbon Music, Upset the Rhythm
Screen Memories	Released: October 27, 2017; Label: Ribbon Music
Addendum	Released: April 20, 2018; Label: Ribbon Music
Later Than You Think	Released: September 26, 2025; Label: Young

Compilation

Title	Release
A Collection of Rarities and Previously Unreleased Material	Released: July 12, 2012; Label: Ribbon Music

Early unofficial albums

- 1999: Snowless Winters EP (Demonstration Bootleg)
- 2000: Love Letters from Hell (Demonstration Bootleg)
- 2003: Second Album EP (Demonstration Bootleg)
- 2003: I Want to Live (Demonstration Bootleg)
