= Bobby (Bobby album) =

Studio album by Bobby
- Released: June 21, 2011
- Genre: Indie rock; psychedelic
- Length: 61:40
- Label: Partisan

Professional ratings
Review scores
Source	Rating
Consequence of Sound	3.5/5 stars

Bobby is the debut studio album by the band of the same name, and it was released in 2011 on Partisan Records. Consequence of Sound said of the album, "Its delicate balance between calm and eerie provides a nice escape from the drums, guitar, and bass formula, assuring that Bobby’s atypical sound will reserve a place for the group among their peers at the synth-folk table for some time to come."

== Track listing ==
No.	Title	Length
1.	"We Saw"	7:07
2.	"Sore Spores"	4:42
3.	"Tomb Bloom"	6:44
4.	"Nap Champ"	5:50
5.	"It's Dead Outside"	6:44
6.	"Loading Phase"	2:58
7.	"Ginger (Water Birth)"	5:08
8.	"Downing"	0:53
9.	"Shimmychick"	4:39
10.	"Groggy"	5:50
11.	"Dustbeam"	6:18
12.	"The Shed"	4:54
Total length:		61:40
