= Kika Karadi =

Hungarian-American artist

- Born: Krisztina Karádi; 1975 (age 50–51); Budapest, Hungary
- Education: Maryland Institute College of Art
- Occupation: Visual artist
- Spouse: John Maus (m. 2017)

Kika Karadi (born Krisztina Karádi in 1975) is a Hungarian-American artist. She is known for her abstract painting style.

== Biography ==
Kika Karadi was born in 1975 in Budapest, Hungary and moved to the United States at age 11. She attended Maryland Institute College of Art (MICA) and graduated with a B.F.A. in 1997.

Karadi had her first European solo show in Naples, Italy, in 2006. In 2017, she was an artist in residence at the Chinati Foundation in Marfa, Texas. She has held solo exhibitions at the Jonathan Viner Gallery in London and The Journal Gallery in New York City.

== Technique ==
Karadi is noted for her large-scale paintings made in response to the aesthetics of the film noir genre. Her paintings were described as "black stenciled signage on a white background", in which she "reintroduces hints of representation - atmospheric cinematic scenes, figurative forms and symbols which welcome the impurities of cultural collision." She approaches painting with a monographic technique. Her body of work using this process refers to the abandoned Oak Park Mall in Austin, Minnesota where she maintained her studio since early 2014.

== Personal life ==
In 2017, Karadi married the American musician John Maus.
