= Love Is Real =

Studio album by John Maus
- Released: November 19, 2007
- Genre: Synth-pop; dark wave
- Length: 47:16
- Label: Upset the Rhythm
- Producer: John Maus

John Maus chronology
Songs (2006)	Love Is Real (2007)	We Must Become the Pitiless Censors of Ourselves (2011)

Professional ratings
Review scores
Source	Rating
Pitchfork	6.4/10
Drowned in Sound	9/10 stars

Love Is Real is the second album by the American lo-fi musician John Maus, released in 2007 on the British label Upset the Rhythm.

== Track listing ==
1. Heaven Is Real (4:16)
2. Do Your Best (2:45)
3. Rights for Gays (2:36)
4. Love Letters From Hell (3:15)
5. The Silent Chorus (5:00)
6. Navy Seals (2:16)
7. Pure Rockets (3:21)
8. My Whole World's Coming Apart (3:43)
9. Don't Worship the Devil (3:41)
10. Tenebrae (5:19)
11. Too Much Money (3:24)
12. Green Bouzard (1:00)
13. Old Town (1:58)
14. Times Is Weird (4:42)
