= We Brave Bee Stings and All =

Studio album by Thao & the Get Down Stay Down
- Released: January 29, 2008
- Genre: Folk
- Label: Kill Rock Stars

Thao & the Get Down Stay Down chronology
Like the Linen (2005)	We Brave Bee Stings and All (2008)	Know Better Learn Faster (2009)

Professional ratings
Review scores
Source	Rating
AllMusic	3.5/5 stars
AsiaXpress	4/4 stars
Pitchfork Media	7.7/10
PopMatters	7/10
Spin	3.5/5 stars

We Brave Bee Stings and All is the debut studio album by alternative folk band Thao & the Get Down Stay Down. It was released in January 2008. The album was #10 on emusic.com's list of the best albums of 2008, where it was described as "a friendly and catchy pop record" and "an astonishing mash of herky-jerked D.C. punk and Olympia-style folk"

== Track listing ==
1. "Beat (Health, Life and Fire)" – 2:31
2. "Bag of Hammers" – 2:49
3. "Big Kid Table" – 3:48
4. "Swimming Pools" – 2:08
5. "Geography" (feat. Laura Veirs) – 3:14
6. "Feet Asleep" – 3:40
7. "Yes, So On and So On" – 2:52
8. "Fear and Convenience" – 4:03
9. "Violet" – 2:44
10. "Travel" – 1:46
11. "We Go" – 2:34
