= Thao + Mirah =

Thao & Mirah

Studio album by Thao Nguyen & Mirah
- Released: April 26, 2011
- Genre: Indie rock
- Length: 40:13
- Label: Kill Rock Stars
- Producer: Tune-Yards

Mirah chronology
(a)spera (2009)	Thao & Mirah (2011)	Changing Light (2014)

Thao & Mirah is a collaborative studio album by Thao Nguyen & Mirah, released in 2011 on Kill Rock Stars. In support of the album Thao and Mirah toured with indie music artists such as BOBBY. It was well received by music critics; according to Pitchfork, "everything on Thao & Mirah feels of a cohesive collaborative piece, separate from either artist's solo work, a combination that synthesizes their individual strengths to outstanding effect."

== Background ==
In early 2010, Mirah performed with Thao Nguyen at the Noise Pop Festival in San Francisco. The two later announced a 2010 North American tour, billed under the name Thao and Mirah With The Most of All. Mirah and Thao performed a collaborative set and shared vocal duties on each artist's respective songs. The two artists subsequently recorded Thao & Mirah.

== Production and release ==
Thao & Mirah was produced by Merrill Garbus of Tune-Yards and recorded in San Francisco, California. It was released on April 26, 2011 on the record label Kill Rock Stars.

The two toured in support of the album while working with Air Traffic Control, an organization that provides artists a platform for social activism. To support the album, Thao and Mirah have toured with indie music artists such as BOBBY.

== Critical reception ==
Professional ratings
Aggregate scores
Source	Rating
Metacritic	76/100
Review scores
Source	Rating
AllMusic	3.5/5 stars
The A.V. Club	B−
Consequence of Sound	4/5 stars
Dusted Magazine	favorable
Paste	8.8/10
Pitchfork	7.9/10
PopMatters	7/10 stars
Tiny Mix Tapes	3.5/5

At Metacritic, which assigns a weighted average score out of 100 to reviews from mainstream critics, the album received an average score of 76% based on 11 reviews, indicating "generally favorable reviews".

According to Pitchfork, "Some songs are more clearly led by one singer or the other-- Mirah's mournful unreeling on "Spaced Out Orbit" or Thao's rusty guitar slide and junkyard drum clatter of "Squareneck"...but everything on Thao & Mirah feels of a cohesive collaborative piece, separate from either artist's solo work, a combination that synthesizes their individual strengths to outstanding effect."

== Track listing ==
No.	Title	Length
1.	"Eleven" (featuring Tune-Yards)	4:01
2.	"Folks"	2:54
3.	"Little Cup"	3:35
4.	"Rubies and Rocks"	4:03
5.	"Teeth"	2:52
6.	"Spaced Out Orbit"	4:24
7.	"How Dare You"	2:59
8.	"Sugar and Plastic"	2:03
9.	"Likable Man"	3:34
10.	"Hallelujah"	4:08
11.	"Squareneck"	3:39

== Personnel ==
Thao + Mirah

- Thao Nguyen - vocals (1, 2, 5, 7, 9–11); percussion (1, 9), surdo (2), guitar (2, 5, 9), drums (2, 9), floor tom & stomping (5), banjo (6), electric guitar (7, 10), acoustic guitar (10), squareneck slide guitar (11)
- Mirah - vocals (1, 3–8, 10, 11), backing vocals (2, 9); marimba (1), bass drum & percussion (3), handclaps (3, 5), nylon string guitar (3, 8), lap percussion & stomping (5), electronic [beats] (6), echo harp harmonica (8), acoustic guitar (10), floor tom (11)
- Merrill Garbus - vocals (1–7, 10, 11), vocal percussion (3), backing vocals (9); electronics [beats] (1, 7), percussion (3), handclaps (3, 5), drums & tambourine (4), finger cymbals (5), Juno-60 (6), Juno-106 & Moog Rogue (7) synthesizers, wine glasses (10), cans (11)

== Charts ==
Chart	Peak position
US Heatseekers Albums (Billboard)	7
