= Know Better Learn Faster =

Studio album by Thao with the Get Down Stay Down
- Released: October 13, 2009
- Genre: Rock
- Label: Kill Rock Stars
- Producer: Tucker Martine

Thao with the Get Down Stay Down chronology
We Brave Bee Stings and All (2008)	Know Better Learn Faster (2009)	We the Common (2013)

Professional ratings
Aggregate scores
Source	Rating
Metacritic	75/100
Review scores
Source	Rating
AllMusic	3.5/5 stars
Drowned in Sound	7/10
Paste	8.6/10
Pitchfork	7.8/10
Under the Radar	7/10 stars

Know Better Learn Faster is the second studio album by alternative folk band Thao & The Get Down Stay Down. It was released on October 13, 2009 on the Kill Rock Stars label.

== Background ==
"The record is primarily a response to the end of a relationship, so a lot of it is pretty reactionary. It’s trying to be introspective, but there’s always got to be a little 'fuck you' in there – or, sometimes there’s a lot."

== Title ==
Thao Nguyen explained the title of the album in an interview with KEXP: “The album is named ‘Know Better Learn Faster’ because you can't. By the time you realize you should, it's too late. And I enjoy the predicament and the totally devastating, unfunny humor of that.”

== Track listing ==
No.	Title	Length
1.	"The Clap"	0:33
2.	"Cool Yourself"	2:34
3.	"When We Swam"	2:58
4.	"Know Better Learn Faster"	3:49
5.	"Body"	3:12
6.	"The Give"	3:43
7.	"Good Bye Good Luck"	2:22
8.	"Trouble Was For"	2:47
9.	"Oh. No."	2:46
10.	"Fixed It!"	2:57
11.	"Burn You Up"	2:28
12.	"But What of the Strangers"	3:37
13.	"Easy"	3:37
