= We Must Become the Pitiless Censors of Ourselves =

Studio album by John Maus
- Released: June 27, 2011
- Genres: Lo-fi; synth-pop
- Length: 31:52
- Labels: Ribbon Music (US); Upset the Rhythm (UK)
- Producer: John Maus

John Maus chronology
Love Is Real (2007)	We Must Become the Pitiless Censors of Ourselves (2011)	A Collection of Rarities and Previously Unreleased Material (2012)

Singles from We Must Become the Pitiless Censors of Ourselves
- 1. "Quantum Leap" Released: February 28, 2011; 2. "Believer" Released: April 25, 2011; 3. "Hey Moon" Released: November 2011

We Must Become the Pitiless Censors of Ourselves is the third album by American musician John Maus, released on June 27, 2011. Its title is derived from French philosopher Alain Badiou's "Fifteen Theses on Contemporary Art". Maus said that he wrote the album in a "search for the perfect pop song". Upon release, the album was met with generally favorable reviews, a contrast from the reception of Maus' earlier work. Three singles were issued from the album: "Quantum Leap", "Believer" and "Hey Moon".

== Background ==
After the release of Maus' first two albums, which generally drew negative reviews upon release, he was awarded a scholarship to study political philosophy at the University of Hawaii, where he had a day job as a lecturer. In the evenings, he continued working on music from his office. In 2009, Maus relocated from Hawaii to a secluded cabin in Minnesota, where he struggled to write material for a third album. He said that he eventually gave up, and instead began "doing lots of chemistry projects and chromatography experiments. I set myself on fire a few times heating inflammable solvents." Meanwhile, he continued his studies at the European Graduate School in Saas Fee, Switzerland and earned his master's degree. He did not live in Switzerland, "but would go out there in the summers. It's like that Black Mountain thing that they did over here years ago, where they bring out all of the heavy hitters and you can study with them yourself."

One of his professors from the university was the French philosopher Alain Badiou, who would originate the title of the new album, We Must Become the Pitiless Censors of Ourselves. Maus wrote the album in "search for the perfect pop song." It included a cover version of Swedish singer-songwriter Molly Nilsson's "Hey Moon", which he described as "just banality, but like any great pop song, it’s much more than that. That’s what I was going for, to find something that was unassailable on all fronts, from a pop standpoint. Becoming the 'pitiless censor' myself."

== Release ==
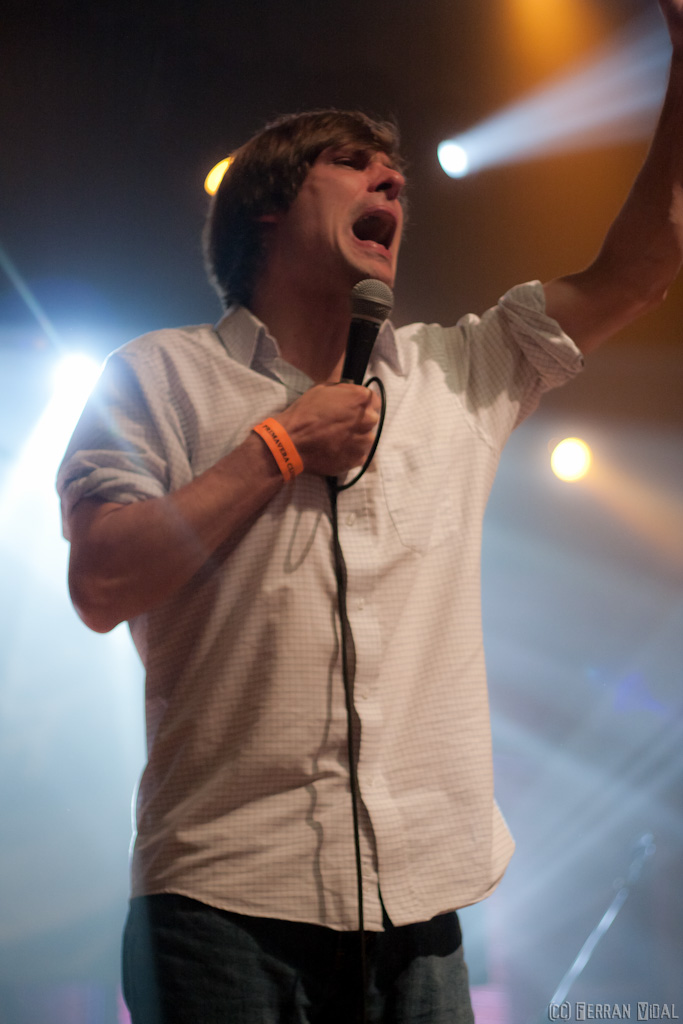
Maus performing in 2011

Professional ratings
Aggregate scores
Source	Rating
AnyDecentMusic?	7.4/10
Metacritic	75/100
Review scores
Source	Rating
AllMusic	4/5 stars
The A.V. Club	B
Fact	3.5/5
The Guardian	4/5 stars
Mojo	3/5 stars
The Observer	4/5 stars
Pitchfork	8.4/10
Q	4/5 stars
Slant Magazine	0/5 stars
Spin	8/10
Uncut	4/5 stars

We Must Become the Pitiless Censors of Ourselves received largely positive reviews from contemporary music critics. At Metacritic, which assigns a normalized rating out of 100 to reviews from mainstream critics, the album received an average score of 75, based on 20 reviews, which indicates "generally favorable reviews". New York Times writer W. M. Ferguson commented that, "Either because his songs evolved or because the culture caught up to him, there is now an audience for Maus’s music. ... by the end of his recent spring tour, he was doing his unhinged karaoke [concerts] to more or less packed houses."

Pitchfork highlighted the album as the moment's "Best New Music"; reviewer David Bevan wrote that it "is the most vibrant and toothsome expression of Maus' pursuits yet." Michael Hann of The Guardian wrote that the work is "hugely enjoyable, even without any theoretical justification." PopMatters' Maria Schurr compared the album's 1980s aesthetic to collaborator Ariel Pink's recent Before Today (2010), writing that Pitiless Censors is "less moody, more consistent in its sense of oddness and intrigue. ... as Before Today provided a breakthrough for Pink last year, We Must Become… could very well do the same for Maus. The songs are clearly strong enough". Jordan Redmond of Tiny Mix Tapes likened the "densely-layered compositions" to those of the Human League and Orchestral Manoeuvres in the Dark, observing "a sparkling album, a lo-fi synth pop masterpiece that manages to give endless aural delights while still being intellectually engaging."

Fact's Samuel Breen believed that while the music "is loaded with liminal pop anthems", it did not succeed at reflecting Maus' philosophical ideas: "too often these songs feel constrained by DIY ideologies and crude experimentation, and there are moments where the gulf between theory and sound could hardly be more distinct." Matthew Cole of Slant Magazine awarded the album a zero-star rating, citing derivative synth instrumentation, "minimal accessibility", and "maximum pretension". He wrote that the album is "at best, like an unfinished video-game score and, at worst, like a Human League track played backward in a Walkman taped to the skull of a drowning man. Sometimes the instrumentals approximate a no-budget Disintegration in their misbegotten twinkliness, but no amount of lo-fi shimmer can compensate for the intentional inadequacy of the vocal lines and the utter lack of memorable melodies."

== Track listing ==
All tracks are written by John Maus, except "Hey Moon", by Molly Nilsson.

No.	Title	Length
1.	"Streetlight"	2:52
2.	"Quantum Leap"	2:52
3.	"...And the Rain"	2:46
4.	"Hey Moon"	4:08
5.	"Keep Pushing On"	3:33
6.	"The Crucifix"	1:15
7.	"Head for the Country"	3:16
8.	"Cop Killer"	2:41
9.	"Matter of Fact"	2:16
10.	"We Can Breakthrough"	2:08
11.	"Believer"	4:05
Total length:		31:52

Notes

- "Cop Killer" is an arrangement of Peter Hajba's 1992 composition "Crystal Dragon" with new lyrics by Maus. The liner notes only mention that the song was "inspired by" Hajba's piece.
- "We Can Breakthrough" includes a sample of a rendition of traditional Bulgarian folk song "Dragana I Slaveya" as performed by the Ensemble Philip Koutev.
