= Ribbon Music =

Record label

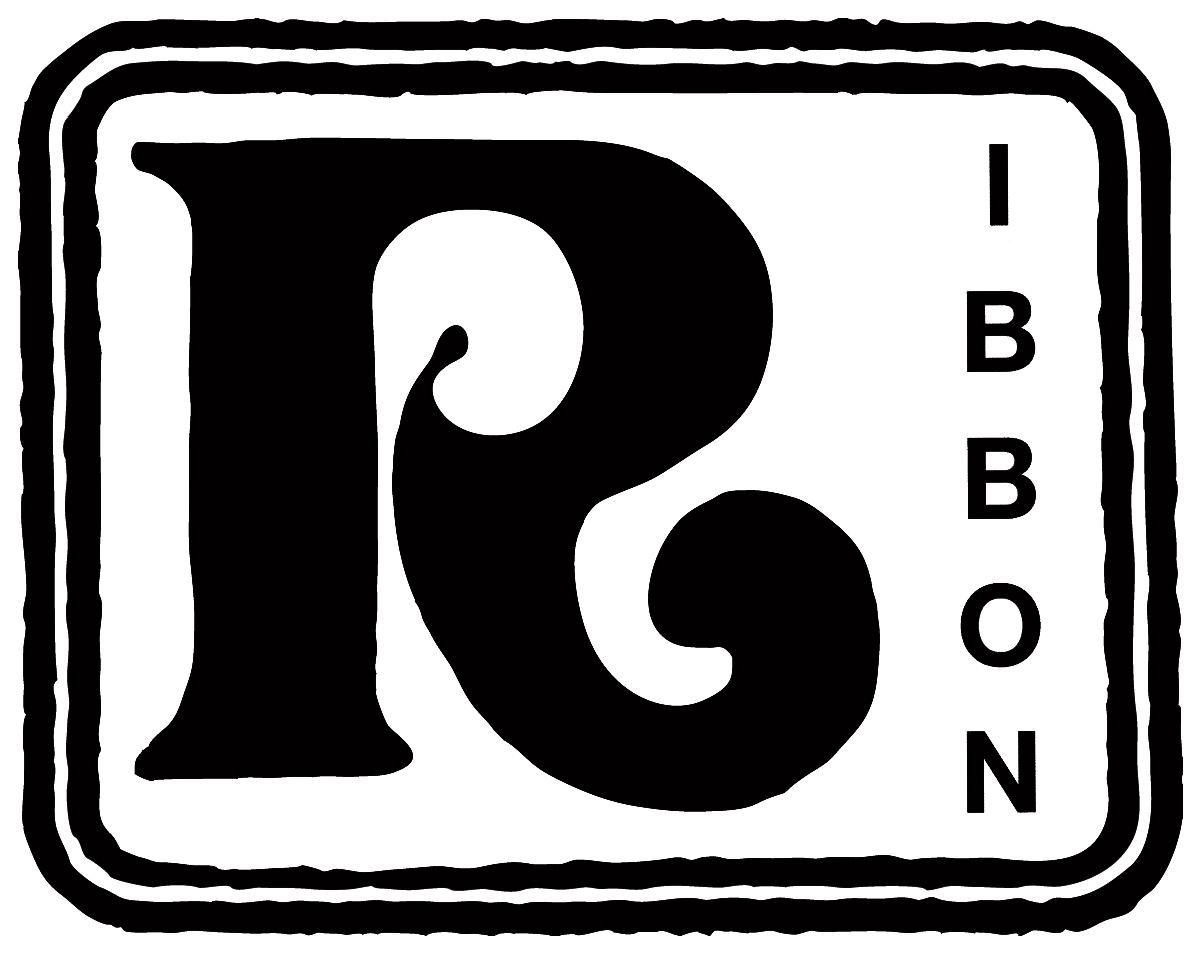
- Founded: 2011; 15 years ago
- Founder: Morgan Lebus
- Genre: Various
- Country of origin: United States
- Location: Los Angeles
- Official website: ribbonmusic.com

Ribbon Music is an American independent music publishing company in Los Angeles, California. It represents writers from genres including rock, country, punk, metal, dabke, electronic, Latin and folk.
