= Maxime Le Guil =

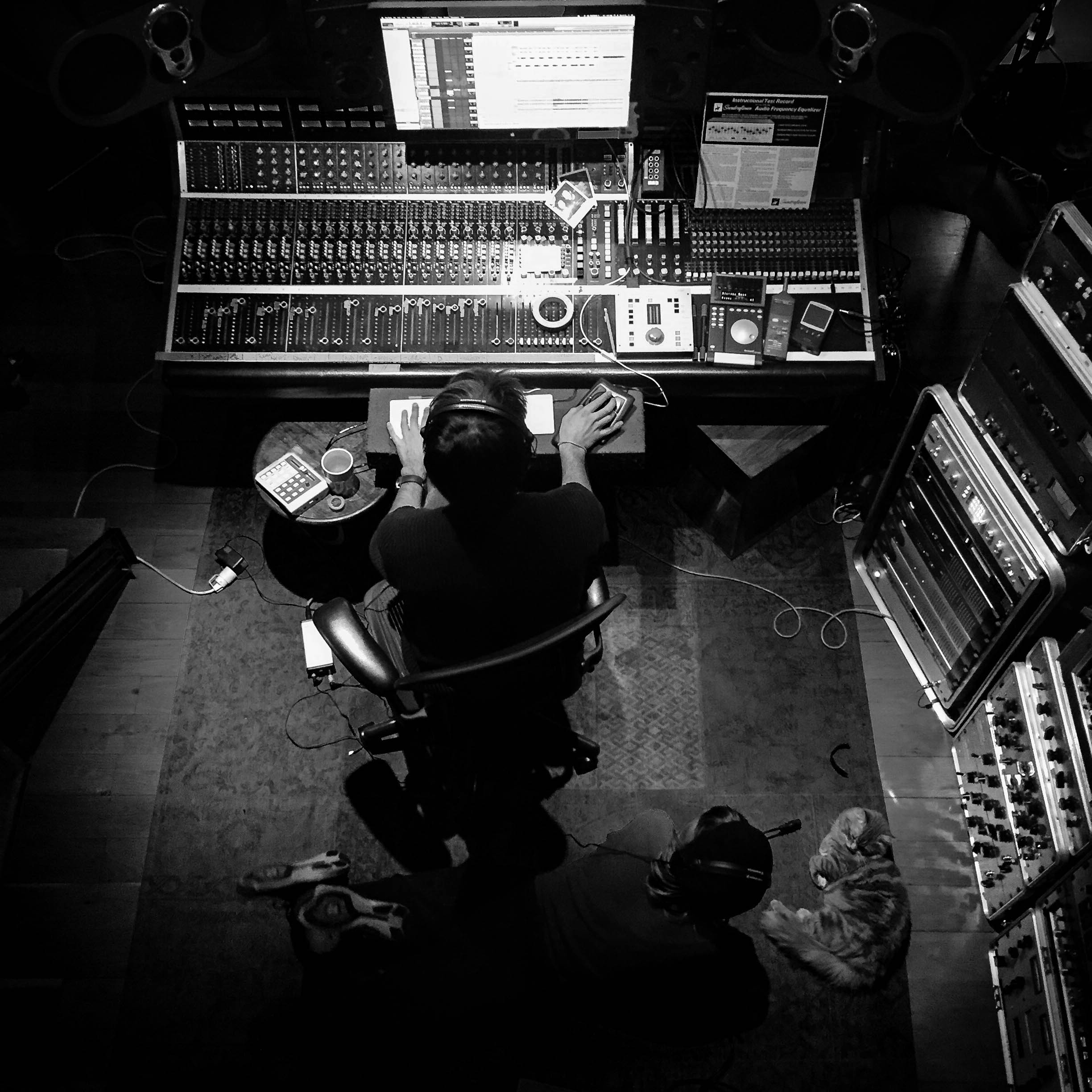

Background information
- Occupations: record producer, engineer, mixer
- Website: http://www.maximeleguil.com

Maxime Le Guil is a French recording engineer, mixer and record producer.

He has produced, mixed or engineered records for Morrissey, Hans Zimmer, Melody Gardot, SoKo, Justice, Melody's Echos Chamber, Camille, Christine And The Queens, Hyphen Hyphen, CocoRosie, Gregory Porter, Lianne La Havas, Vanessa Paradis, Christophe, JoeyStarr, Jean Louis Murat and many others.

In 2009, Le Guil and Victor Levy-Lasne founded Mix With The Masters, an educational resource that teaches audio production and mix engineering classes.

He is the son of Hervé le Guil, who owns the recording studio La Fabrique Studios in Saint-Rémy-de-Provence, France.

In 2016, he was nominated for a Grammy Award for Best Engineered Album, Non-Classical for his work on Currency of Man by Melody Gardot.

== Partial Discography ==
- Melody Gardot - Currency of Man
- Hans Zimmer - The Little Prince
- Hyphen Hyphen - HH
- Christine and the Queens - iTunes Session – EP
- Melody's Echo Chamber - Cross My Heart
- Radiohead - A Moon Shaped Pool - Assistant engineering
- Justice - Woman
- Her - Her
- Camille - Ouï
- Her - Tape #2
- Guillaume Gallienne - Maryline
- Camille - Ilo Veyou
- SoKo - My Dreams Dictate My Reality
- Morrissey - Low in High School
- Christophe - Les Vestiges Du Chaos
- Vincent Delerm - À Présent
- Night Riots - Love Gloom
- Cascadeur - Camera
- Morrissey - World Peace Is None Of Your Business
- Rosemary Standley and Dom La Nena - Birds On A Wire
- Christophe - Intime
- Vincent Delerm - Les Amants Parallèles
- Kyrie Kristmanson - Modern Ruin
- Round Nina - A Tribute To Nina Simone
- L - Chansons
- Teleskopes - Lazers
- Joeystarr - Egomaniac
- Concrete Knives - Be Your Own King
- Pi Ja Ma - Radio Girl – EP
- Tribute - Autour De Chet
- Mika - The Origin Of Love
- Jean Louis Murat - Grand Lièvre
- Archipel - Rowing Jewel
- SoKo - I Thought I Was An Alien
