= We Might Be Dead by Tomorrow =

Single by Soko

from the album I Thought I Was an Alien
- Released: 2012
- Recorded: 2012
- Genre: Indie pop
- Length: 2:41
- Songwriter: Soko
- Producers: Soko, Fritz Michaud

Soko singles chronology
"First Love Never Die" (2012)	"We Might Be Dead by Tomorrow" (2012)	"Love Letter" (2014)

Music video
- "We Might Be Dead by Tomorrow" on YouTube

"We Might Be Dead by Tomorrow" is a song by French singer Soko, from her studio album I Thought I Was an Alien. The track began to chart in 2014, thanks to the number of views of the viral YouTube video First Kiss, which the song is featured in.

== Production and composition ==
"We Might Be Dead by Tomorrow" was inspired by the death of Soko's father when she was five years old. According to her, "I think it affected my and brother's lives in such a way that we are absolute lovers of life. I get so attached, so quickly because I have this extremely high consciousness of death, that it's just around the corner. So I hold on to every bit of love I can get." She said the song was "calling people out on being even more loving, and stop all the "I'm too busy for a relationship" talk, and selfish things of that kind, just because they are scared to be vulnerable and to love" and "about embracing love as the most grandiose thing in life." She claimed to have been crying throughout the song's writing process.

Soko wrote and produced "We Might Be Dead by Tomorrow", with additional production from Fritz Michaud. The track's instrumentation consists of a guitar, soft violin and Soko's vocals. On the night she wrote the song, she called Yeti Beats for a session, recording the vocals and guitar at the same time in two takes. She later asked her friend Indiana to perform the violin, and "wanted her to play a lot of harmonics because I think they sound like crying whales, and I find it to be the saddest and most beautiful comforting sound ever." The session lasted for only a few hours, and was "the easiest studio day ever". The track was later mixed by Bob Clearmountain, and finally mastered by Dave Cooley and Mandy Parnell.

== Commercial performance ==
In late March, 2014, "We Might Be Dead by Tomorrow" topped both the United States' Billboard Streaming Songs and Rock Streaming Songs chart, with 11.5 million streams. 99% of the streams came from the viral YouTube video First Kiss that included the track. The same week, the song debuted at number nine on the country's Hot 100 chart, with 96% of the point coming from the streams, and was downloaded 10,000 times in addition. It was 2014's first top 10 Hot 100 debut, the first top 10 debut for an artist or band's first entry since Ariana Grande's "The Way", and the highest arrival for a new act since the song "Harlem Shake" by Baauer. "We Might Be Dead by Tomorrow" dropped off the Billboard Hot 100 the following week, making it the highest-charting song that was only on the Hot 100 for one week in the history of the chart, until 2024 when "7 Minute Drill" by J. Cole surpassed it. It was the first Hot 100 hit to drop out of the entire chart from the top 10. Other US Billboard charts that it debuted on include Hot Rock Songs at number three, Rock Digital Songs at number 26, and Alternative Digital Songs at number 24. In other countries, it launched at number 51 in Austria, number 39 in the Belgian territory of Wallonia, 66 on the Hot Canadian Digital Songs chart, 72 in Switzerland, and 18 on the UK Indie Chart.

== Live performances ==
In December 2013, Soko performed "We Might Be Dead by Tomorrow" on the show Last Call with Carson Daly.

== Use in media ==
The song is used over the final scene and during the closing credits of the second episode of the first season of the British comedy television series The End of the F***ing World. The song is also featured in the season 1 finale of Fox's 9-1-1: Lone Star and the twenty-first episode of the first season of The American TV Series Forever, and is featured as the closing music for the short film The Windshield Wiper and the season 5 finale of the TV series Elite. The song was used in the official launch trailer for The Alters, an upcoming survival game developed and published by 11 Bit Studios, which was debuted at the PC Gaming Show in June 2025.

== Chart positions ==
=== Weekly charts ===
Chart (2014)	Peak position
Austria (Ö3 Austria Top 40)	51
Belgium (Ultratop 50 Wallonia)	39
Canada (Hot Canadian Digital Songs)	66
France (SNEP)	61
Switzerland (Schweizer Hitparade)	60
UK Indie (OCC)	18
UK Singles (Official Charts Company)	145
US Billboard Hot 100	9
US Hot Rock & Alternative Songs (Billboard)	3

=== Year-end charts ===
Chart (2014)	Position
US Hot Rock Songs (Billboard)	39
