= The Lion's Mouth Opens =

2014 documentary short film about Huntington's disease

- Directed by: Lucy Walker
- Starring: Marianna Palka
- Distributed by: HBO
- Release date: January 2014 (Sundance)
- Language: English

The Lion's Mouth Opens is a 2014 short documentary film. It follows actress and filmmaker Marianna Palka as she pursues testing to learn whether she inherited the genetic mutation that causes Huntington's disease, an incurable neurodegenerative disease.

Directed by documentarian Lucy Walker, the film premiered in a 14-minute version at the 2014 Sundance Film Festival. Later recut into 28-minute version, it was broadcast on HBO on 1 June 2015.

The Lion's Mouth Opens was shortlisted for Best Documentary Short at the 87th Academy Awards.

== Development ==
Filmmaker and actress Marianna Palka knew she was at risk for fatal and untreatable neurodegenerative illness Huntington's disease as her father has the disease; his illness, which became symptomatic when she was eight years old, meant his children had a 50% risk of inheriting the disease. She reached out to director Lucy Walker, whom Palka knew from the Sundance Film Festival, with the idea of making the film about her decision to be tested (approximately 90% of at-risk patients do not choose to be tested). Walker, frequently solicited for documentary projects, expected to turn down the pitch, but was persuaded by Palka's compelling on-screen presence as well as the worthy cause-—both bringing public attention to the disease and helping Palka bring meaning to her personal experience. In an interview, Walker said, "When [Palka] told me what it was about, I must confess I was very moved. What a worthy cause that is. And she's so good on camera, she'd be really good at raising awareness. And also I just wanted to give her a sense of purpose in this moment. Having a camera around can give a real sense of comfort when times are really trying. Some people can be comforted by the fact that their suffering might be helping somebody else in the future."

== Premiere ==
The film was broadcast on June 1, 2015 on HBO.

== Plot ==
The film begins at a dinner party. Filmmaker and actress Marianna Palka, 33 years old, is joined by friends in anticipation of the genetic testing results she will receive the next day, revealing whether or not she has inherited the presently untreatable neurodegenerative illness, Huntington's disease, from her father, who has the illness.

Palka recounts how she has always felt she does not have the disease, and the film intercuts with home movie scenes from her childhood, as her father's disease develops, as well as with interviews with Palka, her mother, and Palka's close friend Jason Ritter.

The film finishes with Palka making the trip to the hospital with her friends to get the results. She tests positive for the mutation that results in Huntington's.

== Cast ==
- Marianna Palka
- Jason Ritter
- Bryce Dallas Howard
- Seth Gabel
- Christian Williams

== Style ==
Reviewing the film for RogerEbert.com, Collin Souter notes, "Walker and editor Joe Peeler wisely forgo any scoring or any other overly manipulative tactics to conjure up any emotions in the viewer."

Walker has said she made a choice in the film's second, longer cut to show more of the disease's impact, encouraged by the community of patients and families who wanted to improve the public's understanding of the disease.

"My main note to myself after the short version was 'this is great, but people don't know why it's such a difficult disease. We have to show it.' [...] We tend to be quite shy and I think sometimes your first instinct is to not show it and that is a good instinct in the sense that it feels respectful, but actually when you get into that community, they really want people to understand it and they really want people to recognize it. Because a lot of challenges they face have to do with when people don't recognize the symptoms when they come across them. "There's a horrible story about a cop beating up a guy with symptoms and arrested him because they told him to stop moving and they thought he was resisting arrest, but his movements got more out of control the more agitated he got. And he couldn't explain himself and they thought he was just some resistant drug addict. So, the community wants this stuff to be seen, so I had to swallow that kind of shyness and try to find a way to accomplish that."

Walker ultimately reached out to other families with requests to film so they could expand the footage showing the disease's effects.

Writing for PBS's POV Blog, Tom Roston notes the discomfiting narrative structure of the film, which resists preparing viewer's expectations for what kind of the ending they should anticipate, in contrast to the experience of "see[ing] Michael Moore films to rage against 'the man,' or [watching] a doc about a beloved musical legend with the hope of being moved and inspired." Instead, Roston noticed himself feeling uncertain about what the film was building toward: "I couldn't help but begin thinking, well, if she has [Huntington's], then it's going to be one kind of movie (tragic, melancholy). If she doesn't have it, it's a very different movie (happy, sense of relief)." Roston notes that this puts the viewer in an experience of difficult uncertainty that parallels Palka's as she approaches the testing: "It's not comfortable. But neither is she."

The film takes its title from a line in the Bob Dylan poem, "Last Thoughts on Woody Guthrie". Guthrie, a long-time inspiration to Dylan, died of Huntington's at 55.

== Reception ==
The Los Angeles Times wrote "an espresso shot to the heart". "The most emotionally devastating film at the Sundance Film Festival this year was a short" – Filmmaker Magazine.

== Awards ==
- Winner Outstanding Achievement in Nonfiction Short Filmmaking, Cinema Eye Honors 2015
- Finalist, Best Short Film, Ashland Independent Film Festival 2014
- Director's Choice Best Short Doc, Rincon International Film Festival 2014
- Audience Award for Best Documentary Short, Traverse City Film Festival 2014
- Shortlisted for Best Documentary Short, 87th Academy Awards
