= My Dreams Dictate My Reality =

Studio album by Soko
- Released: 2 March 2015
- Recorded: Venice, Los Angeles, U.S.
- Genre: New wave; goth-pop
- Length: 43:21
- Label: Because Music; Babycat
- Producer: Ross Robinson; Soko

Soko chronology
I Thought I Was an Alien (2012)	My Dreams Dictate My Reality (2015)	Feel Feelings (2020)

Singles from My Dreams Dictate My Reality
- 1. "Who Wears the Pants??" Released: 8 January 2015; 2. "Ocean of Tears" Released: 4 February 2015

My Dreams Dictate My Reality is the second studio album by French singer-songwriter Soko. It was released on 2 March 2015 through Because Music and Babycat Records. Produced by Ross Robinson, the album features contributions from singer-songwriter Ariel Pink, Revolver guitarist Ambroise Willaume and Warpaint drummer Stella Mozgawa.

The album is a stylistic departure from Soko's early folk-oriented work and takes influences from new wave, gothic rock, post-punk and 80's pop music.

== Background ==
Prior to the recording, Soko tried to contact with The Cure singer and guitarist Robert Smith to ask him to produce her record. She sent a letter to Smith through producer Ross Robinson, who produced The Cure's 2004 self-titled album. Robinson eventually produced the album himself and it was recorded at his Venice Beach studio. Ariel Pink performed on two songs on the album, after Soko guested on two tracks for his 2014 studio album, pom pom.

"Monster Love" was the first track written for the album. It was written after shooting a promo video for the track, "I Just Want to Make It New With You", from her previous album. Soko wrote the track to fill the video narrative after shooting too much footage she liked.

The music video for the track Lovetrap was realised on 23 March 2015. The video futures Soko playing both herself and Ariel Pink. Pink also makes a cameo appearance.

== Critical reception ==
Professional ratings
Review scores
Source	Rating
musicOMH	3/5 stars

Los Angeles Times critic Randall Roberts gave a positive review to the album, writing: "Hardly an innovation in sound, My Dreams nonetheless sticks because of the artist's way with tone, texture and structure. These are good songs, the kind that linger." Roberts also stated that Soko was "mining retro synths, echoed guitar tones suggestive of New Order and the Cure and hitting the mark without sounding (too) derivative," and noted the Waitresses and The B-52's influences. John Murphy of musicOMH also noted the influence of The Cure and '80s alternative rock over the record, stating that "so gloomy and claustrophobic does it become at times that you fully expect Robert Smith to hove into view." Murphy also concluded: "Although My Dreams Dictate My Reality may not be a perfect return to form, there’s enough quality gathered on it to make us grateful that she had a re-think."

== Track listing ==
All tracks are written by Soko except where noted.

No.	Title	Writer(s)	Length
1.	"I Come In Peace"		3:36
2.	"Ocean of Tears"		3:17
3.	"Who Wears the Pants??"	Soko and Ambroise Willaume	3:04
4.	"My Precious"		2:25
5.	"Bad Poetry"	Soko and Stella Mozgawa	2:58
6.	"Temporary Mood Swings"		2:43
7.	"My Dreams Dictate My Reality"		3:42
8.	"Monster Love" (ft. Ariel Pink)		3:31
9.	"Peter Pan Syndrome"		5:23
10.	"Lovetrap" (ft. Ariel Pink)	Soko and Ariel Pink	4:34
11.	"Visions"		4:06
12.	"Keaton's Song"		4:02
Total length:			43:21

== Personnel ==
Credits adapted from AllMusic.

- Soko – vocals, guitar, bass, keyboards, drums, drum machine, layout, photography, production
- Leo Abrahams – additional production, engineering, guitar, hurdy-gurdy
- Daniel Anderson – bass
- Mike Balboa – engineering
- Ryan Baxley – design, layout
- Natalia Bonifaccis – photography
- Michel Comte – cover photo
- Jean Cook – violin
- Gregg Foreman – bass
- Kenneth Gilmore – drums, guitar, mixing
- Maxime Le Guil – additional production, engineering
- Steve Krolikowski – synthesizer
- Ryan Lallier – drums, guitar
- Josh Lattanzi – guitar
- Stephen Marcussen – mastering
- Ben McConnell – drums
- Stella Mozgawa – additional production, drums, engineering, guitar
- Simon Oscroft – bass, guitar, backing vocals
- Christine Owman – cello, musical saw
- Ariel Pink – vocals, bass, keyboards
- Ross Robinson – production, engineering
- Maxime Sokolinski – photography
- Ambroise Willaume – guitar

== Charts ==
Chart (2015)	Peak position
Belgian Albums (Ultratop Wallonia)	68
French Albums Chart	75
