= The Black Boy Scouts =

Danish radio programme

De sorte spejdere
- Other names: Eng: The Black Boy Scouts
- Genre: Comedy, Musical talkshow
- Running time: 120 minutes
- Country of origin: Denmark
- Language(s): Danish
- Home station: DR P3
- Hosted by: Anders Breinholt; Anders Lund Madsen
- Produced by: Gry Frid Nielsen
- Recording studio: DR-byen, Copenhagen
- Original release: February 27, 2005 – December 19, 2008
- Audio format: Stereophonic sound
- Podcast: https://www.dr.dk/mu/feed/de-sorte-spejdere-podcast.xml?format=podcast

De sorte spejdere (The Black Boy Scouts) was a Danish radio programme on DR's P3 hosted by Anders Breinholt and Anders Lund Madsen. The programme was aired on weekdays at 2–4 PM, and was also offered online as a podcast.

== Content ==
The hosts referred to their show as "a musical talkshow". It was the only programme on the radio station where the hosts are allowed to play music of their own choice, thus giving airplay to music that aren't in the charts and music from upcoming artists. However the peculiar satire that dominated the show was really what distinguished it from other more common radio shows. The hosts didn't comply with normal radio-behaviour and would often talk at the same time for example, giving the programme a very impromptu atmosphere. In many of the episodes members of the programme's own crew, the producer Gry Frid Nielsen, Karsten "the Philosopher" Holt and various trainees on the radio station, as well as random people they call on air often played an active part in the programme.

As a fairly recurring event "guest DJ" Kjeld Tolstrup (aka. Kapel-Kjeld) visited the studio each Friday and composed the playlist and joined in dialogue between the hosts.

In the end of the show a contest was held called Tillidsbingo (roughly translated: Trust Bingo). Rules were that the listeners made their own bingo cards (preferably of minced meat or some other unusual material) with 15 numbers from 1 to 90 and when they thought they had "bingo" they would call in. When the listeners got through they had to shout "Tillidsbingo" as the first thing they say. If this was achieved all the listener now had to do was to go through some banter with hosts and then s/he had won a T-shirt specially designed by the hosts. The listeners' winning numbers were not checked, thus the name Trust Bingo.

Ever since he first came through in Tillidsbingo in 2007, the then agricultural student (now studying on a mercantile high school) Kasper, who is from a rural part of Denmark called Thy, has been a regular friend of the show. The hosts used to call him every Friday to catch up on how his week had been.

Another recurring theme throughout the show was the reading aloud of apparently sober texts, such as household tips and reader contributions from weekly "age +40" magazines and children's books, but implying a great deal of sexual innuendo.

== Promotion of upcoming artists ==
The show acquired a reputation of boosting young underground artists careers (in Denmark at least). The then completely unknown French singer Soko's song I'll Kill Her was discovered by guest DJ Kjeld Tolstrup when surfing on the website MySpace and became an instant smash hit in Denmark after being played in the show. The song quickly reached number one on the Danish version of the iTunes Store and was the number one song in rotation on radio. Late she played a live mini-session in the show and gave a sold-out concert in Denmark, despite not even having put out an entire album. The same can be said about the just as unknown Israeli/South African singer-songwriter Yoav, who equally soon gave a "The Black Boy Scouts mini-session" and a sold-out concert in Lille Vega.

== Popularity ==
The show was once a late-night radio show only broadcast once a week, but as their popularity grew their spot was first moved to 10–12 am every Sunday and then again to 2–4 pm every weekday. Their new airtime caused the ratings to skyrocket, reaching about 400,000 listeners every day. Their podcast has also had 100,000 monthly downloads, making it the number one on the Danish iTunes's "Most Downloaded Podcasts" list when the show was still aired.

== Awards ==
- 2007 and 2008: The Golden Microphone. The readers of Ekstra Bladet voted the show's hosts as the best radio hosts on Danish radio.
- 2008: Zulu Award for best Danish radio programme.
