= Bitch (film) =

- Directed by: Marianna Palka
- Screenplay by: Marianna Palka
- Produced by: Michael Moran; Daniel Noah; Josh C. Waller; Elijah Wood
- Starring: Marianna Palka; Jason Ritter
- Cinematography: Armando Salas
- Edited by: Brett W. Bachman
- Distributed by: Dark Sky Films
- Release date: November 10, 2017
- Running time: 93 min
- Country: United States
- Language: English

Bitch is a 2017 American dark comedy film written and directed by Marianna Palka.

== Plot ==
Jill Hart, a stay-at-home mother in the Los Angeles suburbs, is overwhelmed by stress and her philandering husband Bill's prolonged absence for work. She attempts suicide by hanging herself with a belt but survives, after which her condition deteriorates. Troubled by a mysterious dog that frequently watches the house from the garden, Jill suffers a mental breakdown and disappears, leaving Bill struggling to balance work with caring for their four children.

The children initially fear Jill has left, been abducted or harmed, but find her feces-smeared clothing and phone in the house. They later discover her in the basement, where she has begun behaving like a dog, snarling and barking at them.

Unable to cope, Bill retreats into work and tries to conceal Jill's condition. Despite pressure from Jill's sister Beth to accept responsibility and contact the family doctor, he blames Jill for the disruption to their lives and resents having to support the family alone. He also rejects the doctor's recommendation that she receive psychiatric hospital care. Increasingly distressed, Bill begins secretly drinking vodka, throws his wedding ring down the shower drain, neglects his job and is fired, further alienating the children. Jill remains in the basement, increasingly feral and aggressive. Gradually, however, Bill and Beth grow closer as he accepts her help and begins caring for the children. He buys dog toys for Jill but eventually asks the children to stop offering them, recognising that their attempts to engage with her cause further stress.

When Bill's affair partner visits, he sends her away, but Beth assumes he invited her and becomes furious. Jill escapes during the ensuing agitation but is later found unharmed by the roadside. Beth tells Bill that her family is seeking legal custody of Jill. During an initial medical meeting, Bill begins to recognise how selfishly he had treated Jill during their marriage. He accepts medical intervention, and Jill is sedated and taken to hospital. Bill cares for the children, cleans the basement and, after a plumber finds his wedding ring, puts it back on. Following their move from the family home, he continues developing as a caring parent, earning the children's appreciation and repairing his relationship with Beth.

Jill eventually returns home while the children stay with Beth. She still behaves like a dog but is calmer. Bill takes her to a local dog park and plays on all fours to encourage her to interact with the other dogs. Later, however, his attempt to help her shower triggers an aggressive relapse and forces Jill to confront her identity. Bill holds her and reassures her as she sobs uncontrollably. The following morning, Jill tentatively gives him her first genuine smile.

== Cast ==
- Marianna Palka as Jill Hart
- Jason Ritter as Bill Hart
- Jaime King as Beth
- Brighton Sharbino as Tiffany Hart
- Rio Mangini as Max Hart
- Jason Maybaum as Jed Hart
- Kingston Foster as Cindy Hart
- Sol Rodriguez as Annabelle
- Arielle Kebbel as Cindy's teacher (name unknown)

== Release ==
The film was released on November 10, 2017.

== Reception ==
On the review aggregator website Rotten Tomatoes, 66% of 38 critics' reviews are positive. The website's consensus reads: "has an intriguing premise and a strong start that hints at greater things for writer-director-star Marianna Palka, even if its reach ultimately exceeds its grasp." Metacritic, which uses a weighted average, assigned the film a score of 55 out of 100, based on 12 critics, indicating "mixed or average" reviews.

Christy Lemire of Roger Ebert.com gave the film 1.5 stars out of 4 stating the film "has a bark that’s far worse than its bite". John DeFore of The Hollywood Reporter said the film was "an unfocused feminist allegory". Jeannette Catsoulis of The New York Times said the film was a "satirical scream of rage against patriarchal prerogatives" and "has a vicious edge that can stifle your laughter".
