= Good Dick =

- Film poster
- Directed by: Marianna Palka
- Written by: Marianna Palka
- Produced by: Cora Olson; Jennifer Dubin; Jason Ritter
- Starring: Marianna Palka; Jason Ritter; Tom Arnold; Mark Webber; Martin Starr; Eric Edelstein
- Cinematography: Andre Lascaris
- Edited by: Chris Kroll
- Distributed by: Gravitas Ventures
- Release dates: January 19, 2008 (Sundance Film Festival); October 10, 2008 (United States)
- Country: United States
- Language: English
- Box office: $39,924

Good Dick is a 2008 comedy drama film written and directed by Marianna Palka. Palka also stars in the film, opposite her then-husband Jason Ritter. Good Dick premiered in the Dramatic Competition of the 2008 Sundance Film Festival.

== Plot ==
A video store clerk stalks, spies on and manipulates a reclusive woman, who often comes to the video store where he works to rent soft-core porn. Eventually, despite his strong optimism, her dislike of sex and resulting defensiveness drives them apart. It is revealed toward the end of the film that her dislike of both sex and relationships was fueled by sexual abuse at the hands of her father. The film ends with a confrontation with her father, and ultimately Ritter's character reuniting with her.

== Release ==
The film competed in the Dramatic Competition at the 2008 Sundance Film Festival in Park City, Utah, U.S.A. The film was given a limited release on October 10, 2008 by Gravitas Ventures.

== Reception ==
Writing for The A.V. Club, Noel Murray gave one of the film's most negative reviews, calling it "indie-quirk to the motherfucking core. Not a single line or gesture has anything to do with the world in which real people live." By contrast, in The New York Times, Jeannette Catsoulis said the film "surmounts its indie-movie quirkiness with exceptional acting and a sincere belief in the salvation of its wounded characters." In the Los Angeles Times, Carino Chocano felt that the film "carries its messed-up, highly improbable premise so lightly and gracefully that it ultimately comes off as a sweet, plausible and curiously grounded love story -- and touchingly old-fashioned for a movie about the adventures of a serial masturbator and the homeless kid who stalks her."

As of June 2020, Good Dick holds a 50% rating on Rotten Tomatoes based on 42 reviews. The website's critics consensus reads, "Marianna Palka's quirky indie debut centered on two dysfunctional loners is hit and miss, but has enough originality to see it through." Good Dick has a Metacritic average of 54 based on 11 reviews, which the site describes as "mixed or average" reviews.
