= Feel Feelings =

Studio album by Soko
- Released: July 10, 2020
- Length: 46:10
- Label: Because; Babycat
- Producer: Soko; Dustin Payseur; Patrick Wimberly

Soko chronology
My Dreams Dictate My Reality (2015)	Feel Feelings (2020)

Singles from Feel Feelings
- 1. "Being Sad Is Not a Crime" Released: January 17, 2020; 2. "Are You a Magician?" Released: March 3, 2020; 3. "Blasphémie" Released: May 28, 2020; 4. "Oh, to Be a Rainbow!" Released: June 26, 2020; 5. "Looking for Love" Released: July 8, 2020

Feel Feelings is the third studio album by French singer-songwriter Soko. It was released on 10 July 2020 through Because Music and Babycat Records.

== Critical reception ==
Professional ratings
Aggregate scores
Source	Rating
Metacritic	70/100
Review scores
Source	Rating
AllMusic	4/5 stars
DIY	4/5 stars
Mojo	3/5 stars
MusicOMH	3.5/5 stars
Q	3/5 stars

Feel Feelings has a score of 70 out of 100 on Metacritic, indicating "generally favorable reviews", based on 5 reviews. Heather Phares of AllMusic said "Soko demands the same commitment from her listeners that she put into making these songs, but as she combines happiness and sadness into something beautiful, the honesty in her music is mesmerizing." Chloe Johnson of MusicOMH reviewed "Feel Feelings represents the complexity of the human experience in that it’s not perfect, however the work put into this album is undeniable."

== Track listing ==
No.	Title	Producer(s)	Length
1.	"Are You a Magician?"	Dustin Payseur	3:50
2.	"Being Sad Is Not a Crime"	Patrick Wimberly	3:20
3.	"Blasphémie"	Patrick Wimberly	3:55
4.	"Looking for Love"	Dustin Payseur	2:50
5.	"Oh, to Be a Rainbow!"	Patrick Wimberly	3:50
6.	"Quiet Storm"	Patrick Wimberly	3:15
7.	"Don’t Tell Me to Smile"	Soko	3:10
8.	"Replaceable Heads"	Patrick Wimberly	4:40
9.	"Let Me Adore You"	Patrick Wimberly	3:35
10.	"Now What?"	Dustin Payseur	4:00
11.	"Time Waits for No One"	Patrick Wimberly	5:05
12.	"Hurt Me with Your Ego"	Patrick Wimberly	4:40
Total length:			46:10
