= Marianna Palka =

Scottish actress, producer, director, and writer

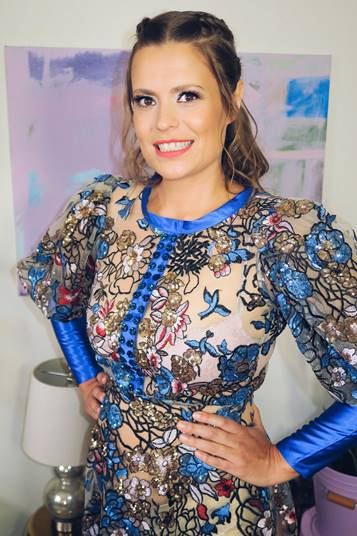
- Palka in 2019
- Born: Marianna Bronislawa Barbara Palka; 7 September 1981 (age 45); Glasgow, Scotland, United Kingdom
- Occupations: Actress, producer, director, screenwriter
- Years active: 2001–present

Marianna Bronislawa Barbara Palka (born 7 September 1981) is a Scottish actress and filmmaker. She is the writer, director and star of the film Good Dick, which screened at the Sundance Film Festival. She co-founded and owned the production company Morning Knight, Inc. with her ex-boyfriend, actor Jason Ritter.

== Early life and education ==
Palka was born to Polish immigrant parents in Glasgow, Scotland. At the age of 17, Palka moved to New York City to study at the Atlantic Theater Company.

== Career ==
Palka wrote, directed and starred in Good Dick, which competed in the Dramatic Competition at the 2008 Sundance Film Festival. The film also featured Jason Ritter, Martin Starr, Mark Webber, Charles Durning and Tom Arnold. The New York Times said the film "surmounts its indie-movie quirkiness with exceptional acting and a sincere belief in the salvation of its wounded characters". Palka returned to 2010 Sundance Film Festival as a Juror with the Alfred P. Sloan Foundation.

Palka appeared in Peter Mullan's Neds, Jeremiah Jones' Restive, Bryce Dallas Howard's When You Find Me, Nathan Sutton's Autumn Wanderer and Sylvia Sether's King of Norway. In 2014, Palka produced and was the subject of the HBO Lucy Walker documentary The Lion's Mouth Opens, which follows the process of Palka discovering she has inherited the genetic mutation that causes Huntington's disease, and which was nominated for an Emmy Award and shortlisted for an Academy Award nomination. Palka made a cameo in the HBO series Girls as Jessa's (Jemima Kirke) sister. In 2017, Palka appeared as Reggie 'Vicky the Viking' Walsh in the Netflix series G.L.O.W .

Palka wrote, directed and starred in Bitch, based on a true story from Scottish doctor R.D. Laing of a mother acting like a dog after a psychotic break. The film made its round in film festivals around the world, after its world premiere at 2017 Sundance Film Festival. In 2017, Palka directed the feature film EGG starring Christina Hendricks, Alysia Reiner and Anna Camp and produced by Michele Ganeless.

=== Theatre ===
In 2010, Palka performed in Love, Loss, and What I Wore at The Geffen Playhouse in Los Angeles. In 2012, she was in The Ensemble Theater in Santa Barbara, California, reading of The Good Soldier. She appeared in Martin McDonagh's The Lonesome West at the Actor's Gang Theatre, Los Angeles, and in Conor McPherson's Dublin Carol at the Ensemble Theatre Company.

== Personal life ==
Palka was in a relationship with Jason Ritter from 1999 to 2013.

== Awards ==
- 20YY: Annenberg Film Fellowship
- 2008: Sundance Film Festival – Grand Jury Prize, Dramatic (nominee) for Good Dick
- 2008: Edinburgh International Film Festival – New Director's Award for Good Dick
- 2010: Sundance Film Festival, Alfred P. Sloan Award
- 2016: News & Documentary Emmy Awards – Outstanding Short Documentary (nominee) for The Lion's Mouth Opens
- 2017: Fantasia Film Festival – Cheval Noir award for Best Screenplay for Bitch
- 2017: Neuchâtel International Fantastic Film Festival – Narcisse Award, Best Film (nominee) for Bitch

== Filmography ==
Creator

- 1990s: By My Very Self (Short)
- 1990s: For My American Friends (Short)
- 2008: Good Dick – as The Woman; producer, director, writer
- 2014: I'm the Same – as Skye; co-producer, director, writer
- 2014: The Lion's Mouth Opens (Documentary short) – as herself; producer, writer
- 2015: Always Worthy – as Genevieve; producer, director, writer
- 2016: Heirloom (Short) – as Maid Ivy; writer
- 2017: Bitch – as Jill Hart; director, writer
- 2018: Egg – director
- 2021: Collection - director

Actor

- 2001: Earth Day (Short) – as Gail (voice)
- 2006: Orchids (Short) – as Girl's Feet
- 2007: Drunk History (TV series) – as Martha Washington (1 episode: "Drunk History Vol. 3: Featuring Danny McBride")
- 2007: Derek and Simon (TV series short) – as Sophie (2 episodes)
- 2009: Betty File 43 (Short)
- 2010: Neds – as Aunt Beth
- 2010: Modern Romance (Short)
- 2011: Insane (Short) – as Marianna
- 2011: Restive – as Jeva
- 2011: When You Find Me (Short) – as Joanne
- 2012: Spoonful (Short) – as Vivian
- 2013: Autumn Wanderer – as Audrey
- 2013: King of Norway (Short) – as Liv Skaarsguard
- 2013: The Price We Pay (Short) – as Hot Chick
- 2013: Slice (Short) – as Radio Newscaster
- 2014: First Kiss (Short) – as Soko's Kisser
- 2015: Pant Suits (Short) – as Joanne
- 2015: Scottish Mussel – as Fiona
- 2015: Contracted: Phase II – as Crystal Young
- 2015: Oh Gallow Lay (Short)
- 2015: Forever – as Kate
- 2016: Girls (TV series) (TV show) – as Minerva (1 episode: "Queen for Two Days")
- 2017–19: GLOW (TV series) – as Reggie Walsh (23 episodes)
- 2017: We Are Boats – as Marko
- 2017: Mississippi Requiem – as Emily Grierson
- 2018: The Adventures of Thomasina Sawyer – as Aunt Polly
- 2019: Good Omens (TV series) – as Frannie (1 episode: "Hard Times")

Theater

- 2006: Dublin Carol by Conor McPherson at the Ensemble Theatre Company
- 2010: Love, Loss, and What I Wore at The Geffen Playhouse, Los Angeles
- 2012: The Good Soldier reading at The Ensemble Theater, Santa Barbara, California
- 2000s: The Lonesome West by Martin McDonagh at The Actors' Gang Theatre, Los Angeles
