= Collection (film) =

- Directed by: Marianna Palka
- Written by: Todd M. Friedman
- Produced by: Warner Davis; Todd Friedman; James Ireland
- Starring: Alex Pettyfer
- Production companies: Warner Davis Company; Dark Dreams Entertainment
- Distributed by: Vertical Entertainment
- Release date: September 17, 2021
- Running time: 87 minutes
- Country: United States
- Language: English

Collection is a 2021 American crime thriller drama film written by Todd M. Friedman, directed by Marianna Palka and starring Alex Pettyfer.

== Cast ==
- Alex Pettyfer as Brandon
- Mike Vogel as Ross
- Jacques Colimon as Sean
- Breeda Wool as Rava
- Shakira Barrera as Christina

== Production ==
In November 2019, it was announced that Pettyfer, Vogel, Colimon, Wool and Barrera were all cast in the film.

== Release ==
The film was released in theaters and on VOD on September 17, 2021.

== Reception ==
The film has a 17% rating on Rotten Tomatoes based on six reviews.
