= Jason Ritter =

American actor (born 1980)

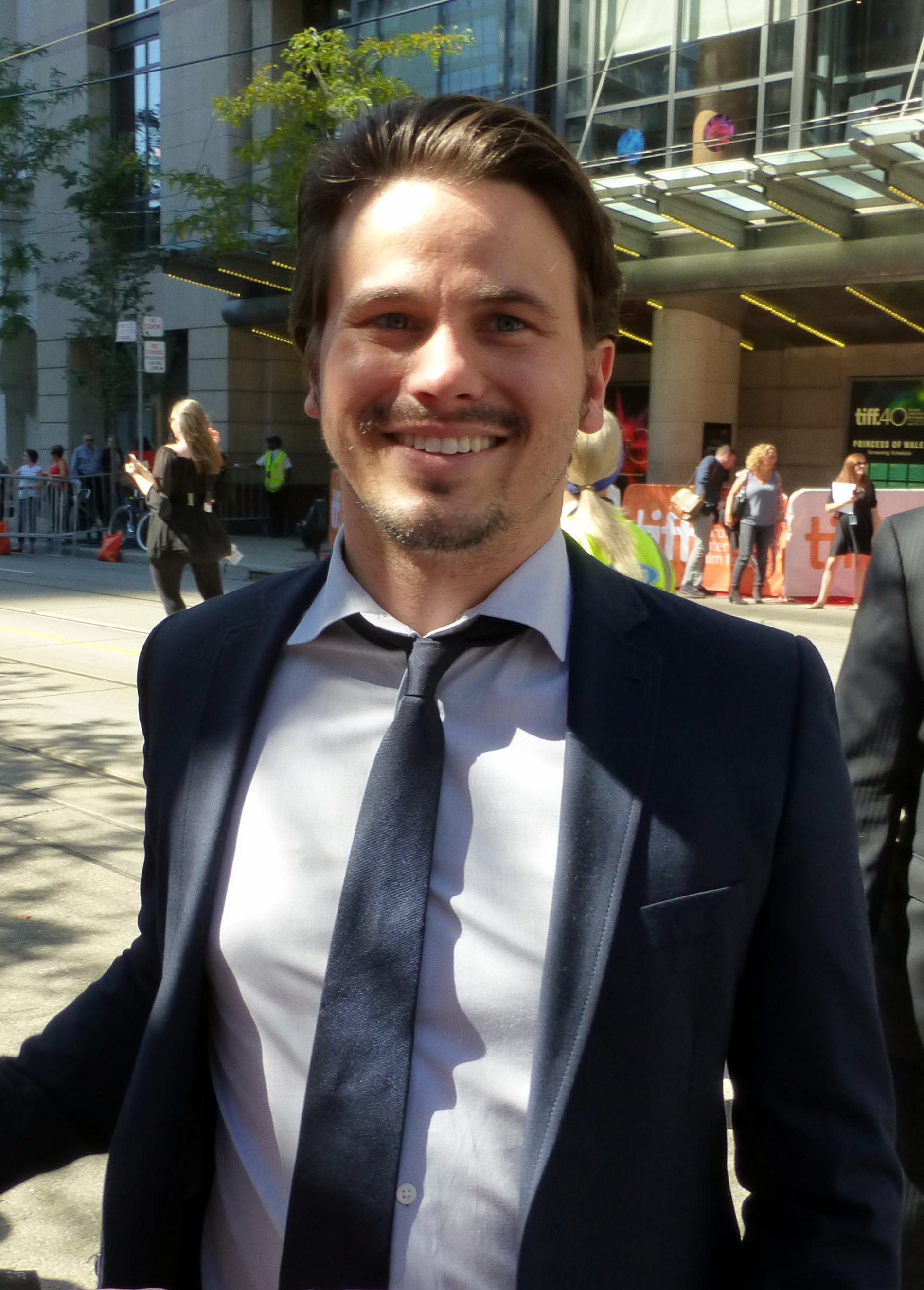
- Ritter in 2015
- Born: Jason Morgan Ritter; February 17, 1980 (age 46); Los Angeles, California, U.S.
- Education: New York University (BFA)
- Occupations: Actor; producer
- Years active: 1990–present
- Spouse: Melanie Lynskey (m. 2021)
- Partner: Marianna Palka (1999–2013)
- Children: 1
- Parents: John Ritter (father); Nancy Morgan (mother)
- Relatives: Tex Ritter (grandfather); Dorothy Fay (grandmother); Tyler Ritter (brother); Amy Yasbeck (stepmother)

Jason Morgan Ritter (born February 17, 1980) is an American actor and producer. The son of John Ritter and Nancy Morgan, he is known for his work in television series such as Joan of Arcadia (2003–2005), Gravity Falls (2012–2016), Another Period (2015–2018), Kevin (Probably) Saves the World (2017–2018), Raising Dion (2019–2022), and Matlock (2024–present). For his portrayal of Mark Cyr on Parenthood (2010–2014), Ritter was nominated for the 2012 Primetime Emmy Award for Outstanding Guest Actor.

Ritter made his feature film debut in Mumford (1999). Subsequent credits include Swimfan (2002), Freddy vs. Jason (2003), Raise Your Voice (2004), Happy Endings (2005), The Education of Charlie Banks (2007), W. (2008), The Perfect Family (2011), Wild Canaries (2014), The Meddler (2015), Carrie Pilby (2016), Bitch (2017), The Tale (2018), and Frozen 2 (2019).

As of 2007, he co-founded and owned the production company Morning Knight, Inc. with his ex-girlfriend, filmmaker and actress Marianna Palka.

== Early life ==
Ritter was born on February 17, 1980, in Los Angeles, California, to actors Nancy Morgan and John Ritter. He is a grandson of actors Tex Ritter, who died six years before Ritter was born, and Dorothy Fay. His stepmother is actress Amy Yasbeck. Ritter has three siblings, including actor Tyler Ritter.

Ritter's television debut happened during the opening credits of the sixth season for his father's sitcom Three's Company. Actress Joyce DeWitt recalls: "Our director, Dave Powers, was just shooting from the cuff when we would go on location to shoot the credits. There was a rough draft, but not really a game plan. And because we were going to be all day on location (at the Los Angeles Zoo in Griffith Park), people brought their children, their wives, whatever, it was kind of a group event, and Davey was just grabbing anybody and everyone to throw into those credits. In my credit, where I'm down and this little boy toddles in, that's Jason Ritter, John's first child."

He attended middle and high school at the Crossroads School in Santa Monica, California, alongside Simon Helberg, who became his roommate at NYU. Ritter attended and graduated from New York University's Tisch School of the Arts, where he studied at the Atlantic Theater Company. He later studied at the Royal Academy of Dramatic Art in London.

== Career ==
=== 1990–2007: Teen films and early career ===
Ritter made his professional acting debut at age 10, playing Harry Neal Baum in the 1990 television film The Dreamer of Oz: The L. Frank Baum Story. Several years later, he had a supporting role as Martin Brockett in the 1999 film Mumford, a dramedy directed by Lawrence Kasdan.

Ritter's film work throughout the early 2000s included prominent parts in teen-oriented projects such as Swimfan (2002), Freddy vs. Jason (2003), and Raise Your Voice (2004). Between 2003 and 2005, he appeared as Kevin Girardi, the disabled brother of the titular main character, on the CBS family drama series Joan of Arcadia. Next, he played a young man struggling to come terms with his sexuality in the dark comedy Happy Endings (2005), with Stephen Hunter of The Washington Post commenting, "The acting in this ensemble is of such a high order that the movie simply takes you in and makes you feel these lives as real."

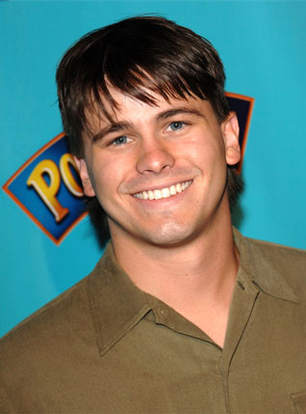
Ritter in 2007

Ritter's portrayal of an Ivy League college student in The Education of Charlie Banks (2007) was met with critical acclaim: The Hollywood Reporter referred to it as a "head-turner" performance that combined "a believably brooding intensity with a bad boy swagger that brings to mind [a] young Matt Dillon."

=== 2008–2016: Independent film roles ===
Following a supporting role in the satirical 2008 comedy The Deal, Ritter appeared briefly as Jeb Bush in the biographical drama W, directed by Oliver Stone. On preparing for the role, he said, "I watched everything that I possibly could and read some books about [the] Bush family [and] Jeb." That same year, he produced and starred in the independent dramedy Good Dick with his girlfriend at the time, Marianna Palka, making her directorial debut. A look at the relationship between an introverted girl (Palka) and the video store assistant (Ritter) vying for her attention, the film drew a mixed reception, but Empire's Anna Smith was enthusiastic in her appraisal: "Ritter's character — a romantic reformed druggie — is one to root for, and [the film] entertains enough to get by, marking Palka and Ritter as talents to watch."

In 2010, Ritter began playing the recurring role of Mark Cyr on NBC's Parenthood. The performance earned him a nomination for the 2012 Primetime Emmy Award for Outstanding Guest Actor in a Drama Series. His next project was the 2011 independent comedy A Bag of Hammers, where he starred as a felon who winds up taking care of a neglected child; in a mixed review, The Hollywood Reporter felt that its tone was "muddled" but believed it "starts off strong, offering funny, well timed dialogue between Sandvig [and] Ritter." Also that year, he co-starred in The Perfect Family, with Kathleen Turner and Emily Deschanel, which critic Frank Scheck felt worked solely on the strength of its performances: "Turner is deeply sympathetic as the religious matriarch [...] while Ritter and Deschanel are thoroughly believable as the grown children who love their mother despite her oft-expressed disapproval of their actions."

Between 2012 and 2016, Ritter starred in the voice role of Dipper Pines on the Disney Channel animated series Gravity Falls, a show about a pair of twins deciphering the weird goings-on in the mysterious titular town. The series was universally praised, with Alasdair Wilkins of The A.V. Club calling it "funny, emotional, beautiful, and terrifying in equal measure." Ritter had prominent parts in five independent features between 2012 and 2013: The End of Love, Free Samples, I Am I, The Big Ask, and The East. It was announced in February 2013 that he would star as Gavin in Us & Them, a sitcom pilot based on the British television comedy Gavin & Stacey. While subsequently picked up as a series by Fox, Us & Them was cancelled before it could premiere, with the show's seven episodes eventually being released by Crackle.

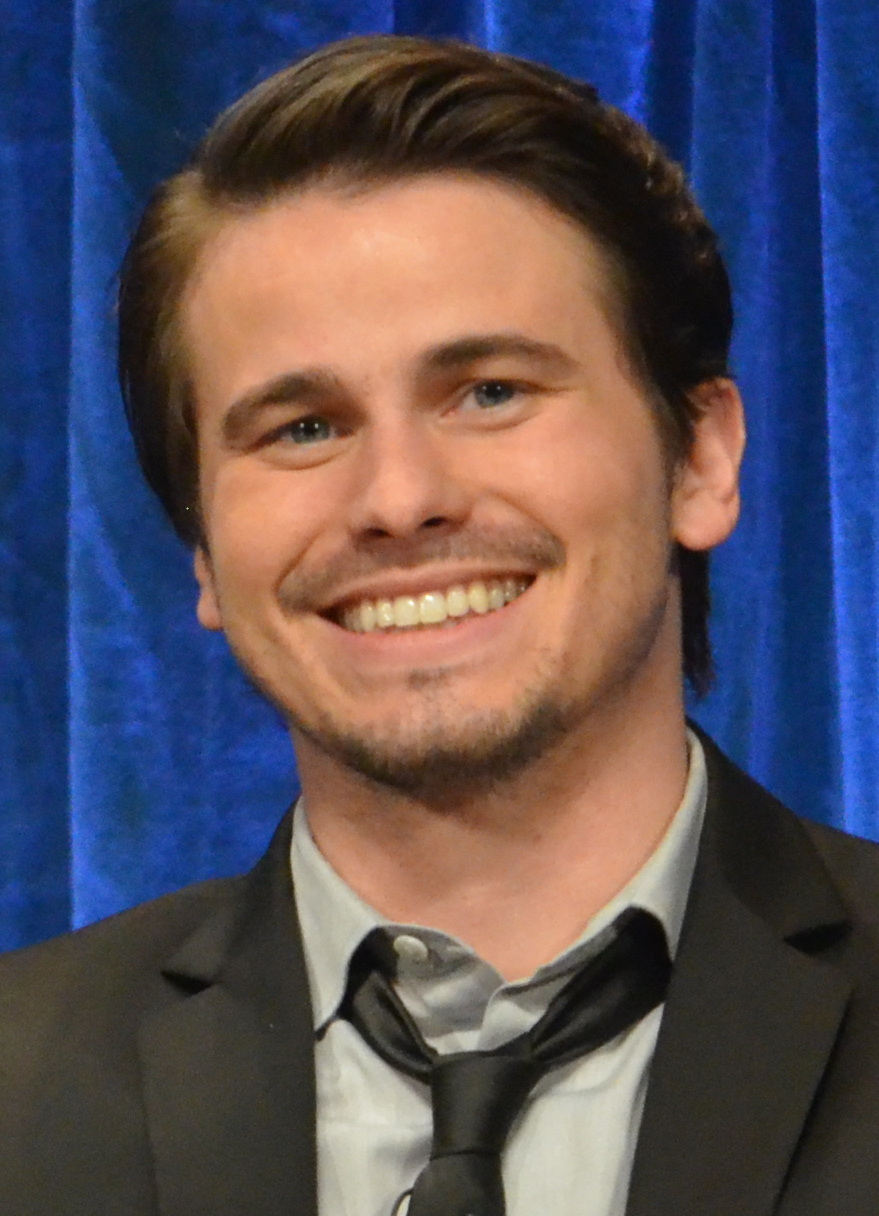
Ritter at the 2013 Paleyfest

Ritter's appearance in Wild Canaries (2014), a throwback to classic whodunits, was met with praise: Justin Chang of Variety called the film "eventful, plot-driven [and] fun," adding that "[Kevin] Corrigan and especially Ritter are solid in their hefty supporting roles." He headlined the independent drama About Alex that same year, playing a young man who finds solace in a group of old friends after attempting to take his own life. In his review for RogerEbert.com, Brian Tallerico said, "What's kind of refreshing about About Alex is that the predictable map through the clichés of this subgenre that seems to be charted in the opening scenes isn't quite followed," adding "Ritter finds [the] emotional undercurrent that's often missing from these troubled characters. There's something honest in the way his voice quivers that makes his depression seem more genuine."

Ritter had a supporting role as the main character's movie star ex-boyfriend in the 2015 comedy-drama The Meddler, and began playing Lord Frederick Bellacourt—an illiterate twin—that same year on the acclaimed historical sitcom Another Period, a parody of Downton Abbey. In their review of Period, which ran for three seasons on Comedy Central, The A.V. Club felt that Ritter brought "an earnestness" to the wacky material. Next, he starred as a man suffering from retrograde amnesia in the post-apocalyptic drama Embers (2015); Sight and Sound critic Anton Bitel called it "a reflection of the human condition as philosophically compelling as it is emotionally intelligent," adding "No film has either moved or provoked me as much this year." In 2016, Ritter co-starred in the well-reviewed ensemble comedy The Intervention and received positive notices for his role in Carrie Pilby, an adaptation of the novel of the same name.

=== 2017–present: Television and film work ===
In the satirical dark comedy Bitch (2017), Ritter re-teamed with director Marianna Palka to play Bill, a promiscuous husband whose wife suddenly takes on the mannerisms of a wild dog. Writing for IndieWire, Erick Kohn said, "The usually sweet-natured Ritter boldly plays against type [as] an American Psycho-like creep," adding that "[the film] works best when it focuses on Bill's ongoing shock at the sudden demand for his responsibility, as he fights through the task of delivering his kids to school and suddenly loses traction in the workplace. A fierce portrait of unwieldy comeuppance, it's both hilarious and terrifying to watch Bill take in the strange events around him."

Ritter's portrayal of Kevin Finn—a depressed financial worker tasked with preventing humanity from self-destruction—in Kevin (Probably) Saves the World was warmly received by critics. The show ran for a single season on ABC between October 2017 and March 2018. Next, he appeared in The Tale (2018), a drama based on the childhood sexual abuse suffered by Jennifer Fox—the film's writer and director—at the hands of her running coach. Ritter played perpetrator William "Bill" Allens, earning strong reviews for his performance: "Ritter has never been better" said Matt Goldberg of Collider, while The Atlantic's David Sims commented, "Handed the tough roles of mentors who shift into monsters, Ritter and [Elizabeth] Debicki subtly calibrate their performances as necessary, projecting a protective edge in one moment and a predatory one in the next. Their transformations are extraordinary to watch, and necessary to reckon with." Ritter said the experience of making the film had been a challenging one, and that there were times after a day's shooting when he "had to go home and let it all out."

In 2019, Ritter played the voice role of Ryder—a member of the Northuldra tribe—in Walt Disney's Frozen 2, which broke box office records upon its release. He began starring as biotech engineer Pat Rollins on the critically acclaimed superhero series Raising Dion the same year, with Aaron Pruner of Thrillist commenting that Ritter's involvement "adds the nuanced character work he's known for." The show ran for two seasons on Netflix before being cancelled in April 2022.

In a casting choice that drew attention for being "meta," Ritter appeared as Deputy Denny Reese in two episodes of the true crime Hulu miniseries Candy (2022), where the character—along with his colleague, played by Justin Timberlake—investigates the 1980 murder of Texan housewife Betty Gore. Gore was portrayed by Ritter's wife, Melanie Lynskey, while the perpetrator—Candy Montgomery—was played by Timberlake's wife, Jessica Biel. The following year, Ritter voiced principal character Jonathan Fall in the animated series Captain Fall, a dark comedy that ran for one season on Netflix.

It was announced in March 2023 that Ritter had been cast in the CBS reboot of Matlock, which began airing in October 2024. In his review of the first season, IndieWire's Ben Travers found Ritter to be one of the show's biggest assets, writing, "[he] has long deserved a regular showcase like [this]."

In March 2026, Ritter was cast as Hanley in the third season of the HBO series The Last of Us. Ritter previously had a cameo appearance in the first season as a clicker.

== Personal life ==
From October 1999 to 2013, Ritter was in a relationship with Marianna Palka. They met while they were both studying at the Atlantic Theater Company in New York City. In 2017, Ritter became engaged to New Zealand actress Melanie Lynskey after four years of dating. The couple had their first child, a daughter, in December 2018. They wed in 2021.

Speaking in 2010 about the death of his father, Ritter said, "I think it helped me realize how fragile we all are. At the end of the day, you can be a health freak or a body builder, but a truck might hit you. Or you might be a huge, larger than life personality and it could all be taken away in the next second. I learned to tell people in my life how I feel about them a little bit more."

Ritter has been open about his struggle with alcoholism, and how his relationship with Lynskey gave him the strength to get sober: "I thought she would be incredible for someone who deserved her, basically," he said in 2023. "And I didn't feel like I was that person... It was only after [a] year into not drinking where I started to go, 'Oh, maybe I can promise some things to someone else. Maybe I can be this person.'"

== Filmography ==
=== Film ===
Year	Title	Role	Notes
1991	The Real Story of Christmas Tree	Little Acorn (voice)	Short film
1999	Mumford	Martin Brockett	
2001	Earth Day	Jack (voice)	Short film
2002	PG	Paul	Short film
2002	Swimfan	Randy	
2003	Smash the Kitty	Josh	Short film
2003	Freddy vs. Jason	Will Rollins	
2004	Raise Your Voice	Paul Fletcher	
2005	Perceptions	Michael	
2005	Happy Endings	Otis McKeen	
2005	Our Very Own	Clancy Whitfield	
2005	Placebo	Daniel	Short film
2006	Lenexa, 1 Mile	Sean Hickey	
2006	The Wicker Man	Bar Guy #2	
2007	The Education of Charlie Banks	Mick Leary	
2008	The Deal	Lionel Travitz	
2008	Good Dick	The Man	Also producer
2008	W.	Jeb Bush	
2009	The Perfect Age of Rock 'n' Roll	Eric Genson	
2009	Oh My Soul	—N/a	Executive producer
2009	Peter and Vandy	Peter	
2010	The Dry Land	Michael	
2010	Morning	Hotel Receptionist	
2011	A Bag of Hammers	Benjamin Platt	
2011	The Perfect Family	Frank Cleary Jr.	
2011	The Brooklyn Brothers Beat the Best	Kyle	
2011	They're with Me	Isaac Solomon	Short film
2011	Atlantis	Ben	Short film
2011	The Five Stages of Grief	Orion	Short film
2012	The Break In	Larry	Short film
2012	Angel of Death	Victim 1	Short film
2012	Trying	Mark	Short film
2012	The Golden Age	Mitch	Short film
2012	Manhattan Mixup	Fritz	Short film
2012	The End of Love	Jason	
2012	Free Samples	Wally	
2013	I Am I	Jonathan	
2013	The Big Ask	Owen	
2013	The Sidekick	Kid Loco	Short film
2013	The Goldfish	Yoni	Short film
2013	The East	Tim	
2014	Hits	Julian	
2014	Wild Canaries	Damien Anders	
2014	There's Always Woodstock	Garret	
2014	About Alex	Alex	
2014	Meet Me in Montenegro	Jason Ritter	Uncredited
2014	7 Minutes	Mike	
2014	You're Not You	Will	
2014	We'll Never Have Paris	Kurt	
2015	The Steps	Jeff	
2015	Embers	Guy	
2015	The Meddler	Jacob	
2015	Always Worthy	Jeff Fredrick	
2016	The Intervention	Matt	
2016	Carrie Pilby	Matt	
2017	The Labyrinth	Usher	
2017	Bitch	Bill Hart	
2018	The Tale	Bill	
2019	Frozen 2	Ryder (voice)	
2020	Baby Kate	David	Short film
2026	I Love Boosters	Upstanding Community Member	

=== Television ===
Year	Title	Role	Notes
1990	The Dreamer of Oz: The L. Frank Baum Story	Harry Neal Baum	Television film
1999	Days of Our Lives	Todd	Supporting role (Season 34)
1999	Undressed	Allan	Main role (Season 3)
2001	Law & Order	Nick Simms	Episode: "Teenage Wasteland"
2002	Hack	Teddy Griffin	Episode: "My Brother's Keeper"
2003	Law & Order: Special Victims Unit	Billy Baker	Episode: "Dominance"
2003–2005	Joan of Arcadia	Kevin Girardi	Main role; 45 episodes
2006–2007	The Class	Ethan Haas	Main role; 19 episodes
2007	All Grown Up!	Mr. Fisk (voice)	Episode: "What's Love Got to do With That?"
2007	This Is My Friend	—N/a	Executive producer
2009	WWII in HD	Jack Yusen (voice)	2 episodes
2009	Mercy	Gabe Tyler	Episode: "Some of Us Have Been to the Desert"
2010–2011	The Event	Sean Walker	Main role; 22 episodes
2010–2014	Parenthood	Mark Cyr	Recurring role; 32 episodes
2012	County	Jack Malloy	Main role; unaired pilot
2012–2016	Gravity Falls	Dipper Pines (voice)	Main role; 40 episodes
2013	Robot Chicken	Ebenezer Scrooge / Reindeer / Sergeant (voice)	Episode: "Born Again Virgin Christmas Special"
2013	Call Me Crazy: A Five Film	Bruce	Television film Segment: "Lucy"
2013–2018	Drunk History	Various	Recurring role; 8 episodes
2014	Us & Them	Gavin Shipman	Main role; unaired pilot
2014	Person of Interest	Simon Lee	Episode: "Prophets"
2014	Key & Peele	Male Customer	Episode: "Concussion Quarterback"
2014	Garfunkel and Oates	Jason	Episode: "Maturity"
2015–2016	Girls	Scott	Recurring role; 5 episodes
2015–2018	Another Period	Frederick Bellacourt	Main role; 26 episodes
2016	Wander Over Yonder	Skipper (voice)	Episode: "The Cartoon"
2016	Goliath	FBI Agent Farley	3 episodes
2016	Gilmore Girls: A Year in the Life	Ranger Bill	Episode: "Fall"
2017	The Long Road Home	Troy Denomy	3 episodes
2017	Tales of Titans	Greg	Main role; 8 episodes
2017–2018	Kevin (Probably) Saves the World	Kevin Finn	Main role; 16 episodes
2017–2018	Skylanders Academy	Dark Spyro (voice)	Recurring role; 12 episodes
2019	Quest	Michael	Main role; 8 episodes
2019–2020	A Million Little Things	Eric	Recurring role; 9 episodes
2019–2022	Raising Dion	Pat	Main role; 17 episodes
2020	Superstore	Josh Simms	Episode: "Customer Safari"
2022	Candy	Deputy Denny Reese	2 episodes
2022	Amphibia	Barrel (voice)	Episode: "The Core & the King"
2022	Slumberkins	Fox Dad (voice)	Episode: "When Things Change/Bigfoot's First Sleepover"
2023	Accused	Jack Fletcher	Episode: "Jack's Story"
2023	Captain Fall	Captain Jonathan Fall (voice)	Main role; 10 episodes
2023	Gen V	Himself	Episode: "The Whole Truth"
2023, 2027	The Last of Us	Clicker (stunt performer)	Episode: "Endure and Survive"
2023, 2027	The Last of Us	Hanley	Recurring (season 3)
2024	Krapopolis	Goose (voice)	Episode: "Olive Oil Crisis"
2024–present	Matlock	Julian Markston	Main role; 19 episodes
2025	Poker Face	Rodney Schomburg	Episode: "The Big Pump"
2026	Lanterns	Billy Macon	Recurring role

=== Web ===
Year	Title	Role	Notes
2008	T Takes	The Guest in Room 23	Episode: "Lobby"
2012	Weasel Town	Haunches (voice)	Main role; 10 episodes
2012	Sketchy	Tom	Episode: "You Got Retweeted"
2013	Ghost Ghirls	William / Brad Wojciehowicz	2 episodes

=== Podcasts ===
Year	Title	Role(s)	Notes
2013–2020	The Thrilling Adventure Hour	Various	4 episodes
2016	The Worst Idea of All Time	Various	1 episode

=== Music videos ===
Year	Song	Artist	Notes
2015	"Waiting on Love"	Nicki Bluhm and The Gramblers	Directed by Todd Hurvitz
2016	"Way We Won't"	Grandaddy	Directed by Chris Grieder

== Theatre credits ==
Year	Title	Role	Venue	Notes
2000	The Beginning of August		Off-Broadway	
2002	The Distance From Here	Tim	Almeida Theatre	
2005	Third	Woodson Bull III	Lincoln Center	

== Accolades ==
Year	Association	Category	Work	Result	Ref.
2003	Saturn Awards	Cinescape Genre Face of the Future Award	Freddy vs. Jason	Nominated	
2004	Teen Choice Awards	Breakout TV Star – Male	Joan of Arcadia	Nominated	
2006	Clarence Derwent Awards	Most Promising Male	Third	Won	
2006	Martin E. Segal Award	Outstanding Achievement	Third	Won	
2012	Primetime Emmy Awards	Outstanding Guest Actor in a Drama Series	Parenthood	Nominated	
2015	Behind the Voice Actors Awards	Best Vocal Ensemble in a Television Series (shared with the cast)	Gravity Falls	Nominated	
2016	Behind the Voice Actors Awards	Best Vocal Ensemble in a Television Series (shared with the cast)	Gravity Falls	Nominated	
2017	Primetime Emmy Awards	Outstanding Actor in a Short Form Comedy or Drama Series	Tales of Titans	Nominated	
2018	International Online Cinema Awards	Best Supporting Actor in a Limited Series or TV Movie	The Tale	Nominated	
2018	Online Film & Television Association	Best Supporting Actor in a Motion Picture or Limited Series	The Tale	Nominated	
