= I Thought I Was an Alien =

Studio album by Soko
- Released: 13 February 2012
- Label: Because Music; Babycat Records
- Producer: Soko; Fritz Michaud; Ryan Hadlock (co-prod.)

Soko chronology
Not Sokute (2007)	I Thought I Was an Alien (2012)	My Dreams Dictate My Reality (2015)

Singles from I Thought I Was an Alien
- 1. "We Might Be Dead by Tomorrow" Released: 2012

I Thought I Was an Alien is the debut studio album by French singer Soko, released in February 2012.

== Release and promotion ==
Stereogum premiered I Thought I Was an Alien for online streaming on 13 February 2012. The album was issued to Belgian, British, Dutch, German, Italian, Irish, Luxembourgish, Polish and Swiss music stores on 17 February.

Professional ratings
Aggregate scores
Source	Rating
Metacritic	68/100
Review scores
Source	Rating
Allmusic	3.5/5 stars
The Fly	2/5 stars
The Independent	4/5 stars
Loud and Quiet	(7/10)
NME	(7/10)
The Stool Pigeon	2/5 stars
Uncut	(6/10)

== Track listing ==
1. "I Just Want to Make It New with You" - 2:19
2. "I Thought I Was an Alien" - 2:18
3. "People Always Look Better in the Sun" - 2:18
4. "We Might Be Dead by Tomorrow" - 2:41
5. "No More Home, No More Love..." - 2:36
6. "For Marlon" - 3:23
7. "First Love Never Die" - 4:22
8. "Treat Your Woman Right" - 4:19
9. "How Are You??" - 3:46
10. "Don't You Touch Me" - 3:23
11. "Destruction of the Disgusting Ugly Hate" - 3:55
12. "Happy Hippie Birthday" - 4:01
13. "I've Been Alone Too Long" - 4:44
14. "Why Don't You Eat Me Now, You Can" - 1:28
15. "You Have a Power on Me" - 2:49

== Chart positions ==
Year	Chart	Peak position
2012	Belgian Heatseekers (Ultratop Flanders)	3
2012	Belgian Albums (Ultratop Wallonia)	35
2012	French Albums (SNEP)	53
2012	Swiss Albums (Schweizer Hitparade)	74
2014	Belgian Albums (Ultratop Flanders)	76
2014	UK Independent Albums Breakers (OCC)	12
2014	US Heatseekers Albums (Billboard)	15
