= Soko (singer) =

French singer (born 1985)

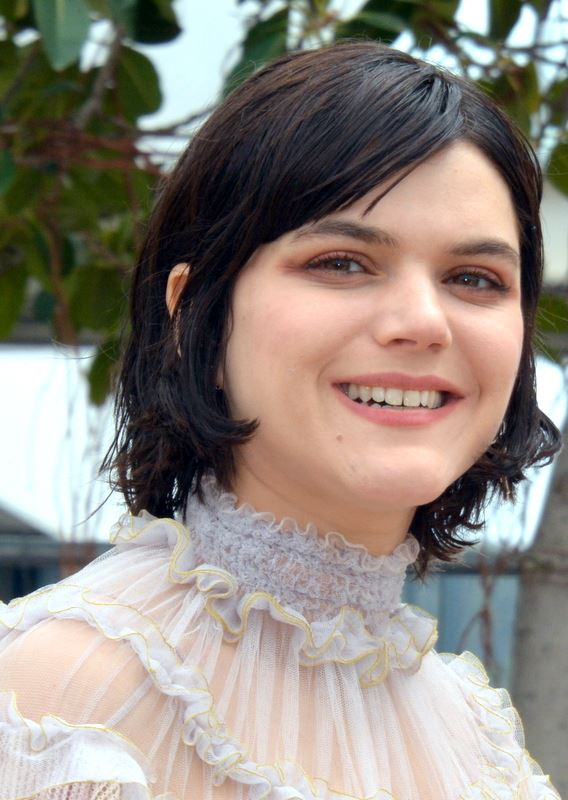
- Soko at the 2016 Cannes Film Festival
- Born: Stéphanie Alexandra Mina Sokolinski; 26 October 1985 (age 41); Bordeaux, France
- Occupations: Singer; songwriter; actress
- Years active: 2002–present
- Children: 1
- Musical career
- Genres: Indie pop; indietronica; folk-pop; new wave
- Instrument: Vocals
- Label: Because Music
- Website: www.sokothecat.com

Stéphanie Alexandra Mina Sokolinski (born 26 October 1985), known professionally as Soko (stylized as SoKo), is a French singer and actress. She released her debut single "I'll Kill Her" in 2007. It achieved airplay success in several European countries as well as Australia, peaking at number three on the Danish music charts, and was included on her debut EP Not Sokute (2007). Her debut studio album I Thought I Was an Alien was released in 2012 and contains the single "We Might Be Dead by Tomorrow", which achieved ninth place on the Billboard Hot 100. Ensuing years saw the releases of her second and third studio albums My Dreams Dictate My Reality (2015) and Feel Feelings (2020).

As an actress, Soko began appearing in a number of French productions in the early 2000s and earned a César Award for Most Promising Actress nomination for her role in the film In the Beginning (2009). She won the Courage in Acting Award at the Women Film Critics Circle Awards and the Best Actress award at the Mar del Plata Film Festival for her role as Augustine in the film Augustine (2012). She later appeared in the short film First Kiss (2014), which featured "We Might Be Dead by Tomorrow" and contributed to the song's chart success. Her role as Loie Fuller in The Dancer (2016) earned her Best Actress nominations at the César and Lumière Awards.

== Early life ==
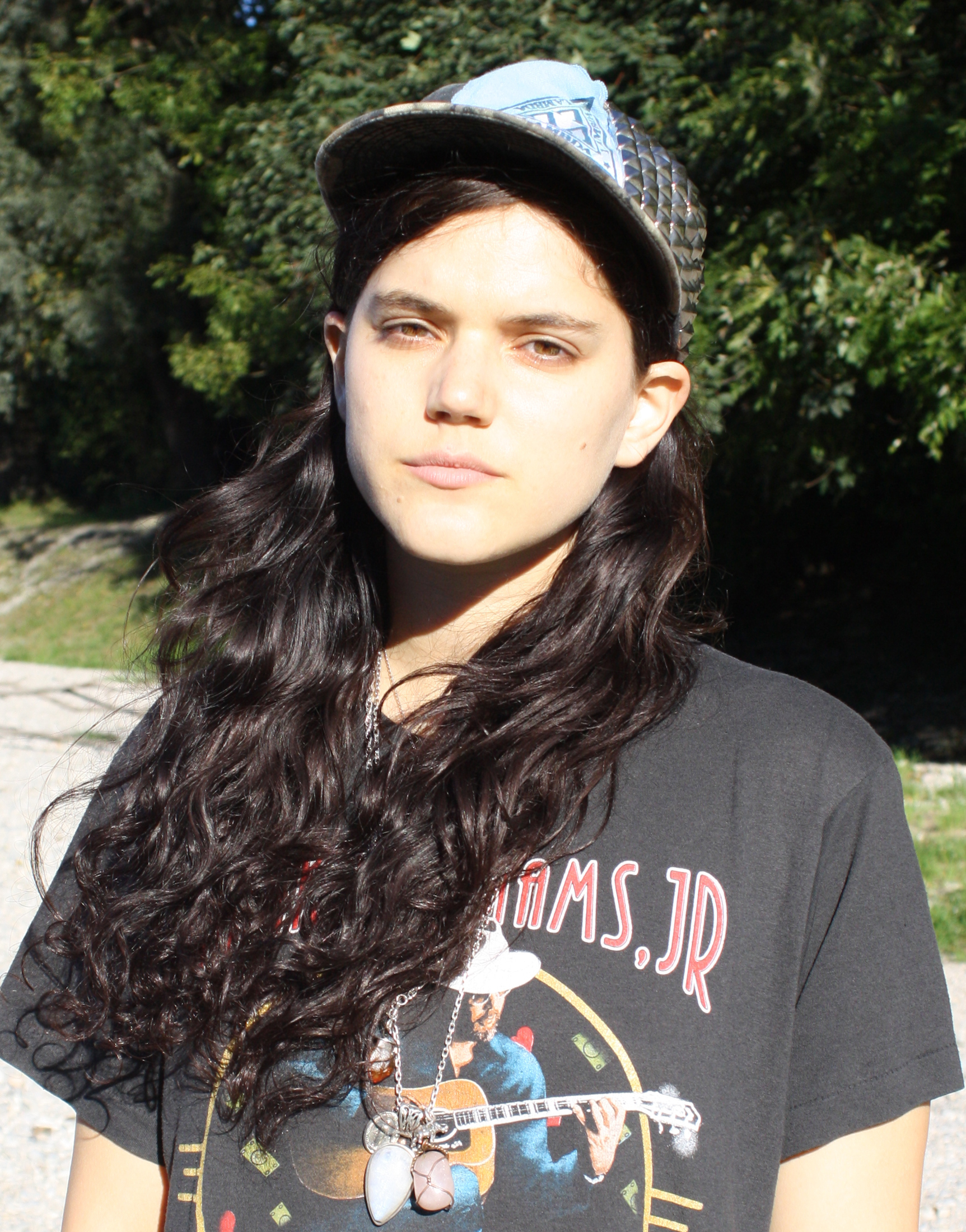
Soko in 2012

Stéphanie Alexandra Mina Sokolinski was born on 26 October 1985 in Bordeaux, France to a Russian-Polish father and a French-Italian mother. She has Jewish ancestry and said that "half of my family died in concentration camps" during the Holocaust. She was raised Catholic "because they all denied their religion and what not", but she has stated that she feels "Jewish trauma". She has five siblings. Her father died of an aneurysm when she was five years old. The incident had a profound impact on her, influencing her to become a vegetarian and later a vegan. This was followed by the deaths of all her grandparents and her godfather within the span of four years. She says that, as a result, she became "obsessed with death" and developed abandonment issues that were exacerbated by the fact that her single mother "wasn't emotionally available". She has used the nickname Soko for as long as she can remember. She began taking piano lessons at the age of five but described herself as a "very bad student" and stopped when she was 11. She left Bordeaux for Paris at the age of 16 to become an actress and began writing songs while taking acting classes at Cours Eva Saint-Paul; she says she "picked up songwriting" when she was 20 and taught herself how to play guitar, bass, and drums shortly afterwards.

== Musical career ==
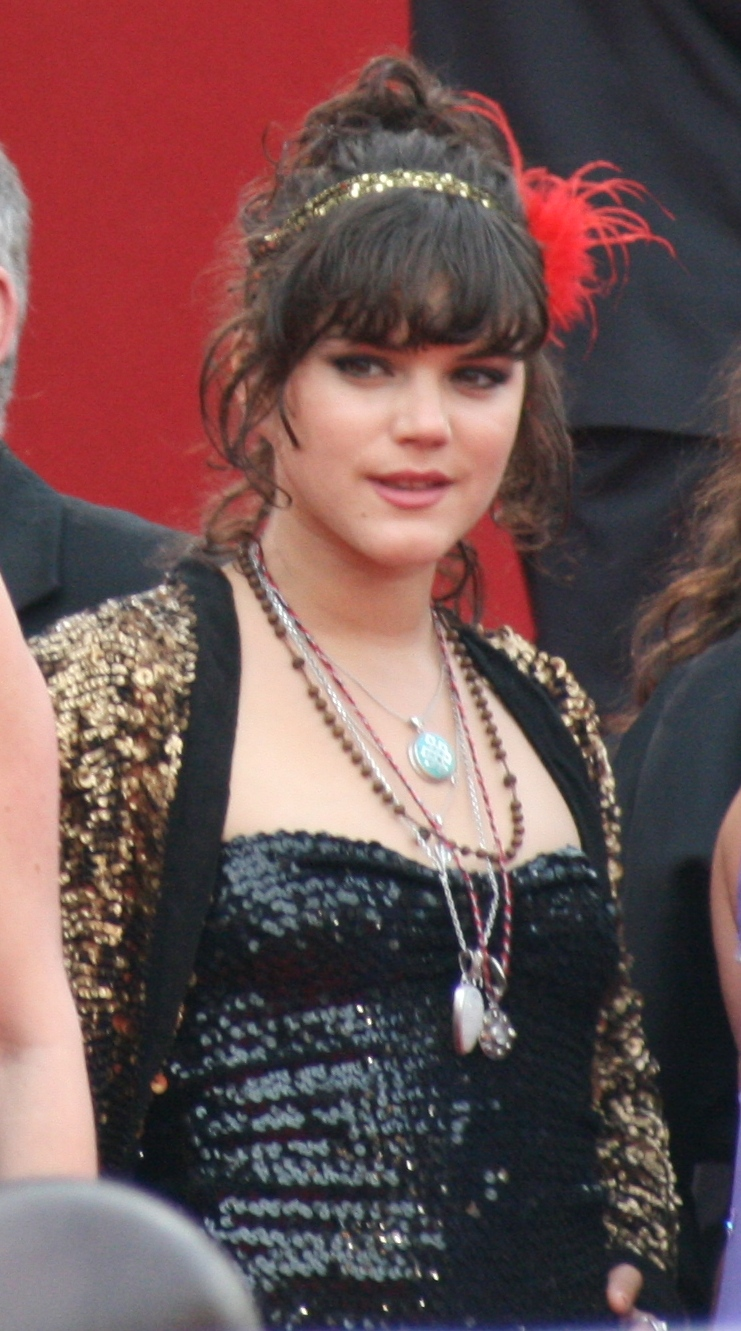
Soko in 2009

In 2007, Soko achieved a hit single in Denmark with a personal anecdotal song, "I'll Kill Her", after the radio program The Black Boy Scouts began to promote it. The song reached number one on the chart of the Danish version of the iTunes Store and was the number one song in rotation on radio. The song also became a hit in Australia, being played on high rotation on Triple J radio; it later placed number nine in the Triple J Hottest 100 2007 music poll. The song was also popular in Belgium being played by Studio Brussel, Radio 1 and Pure FM, and in the Netherlands, being picked up by 3FM radio station. In October 2007 her music was featured in Stella McCartney's fashion show in Paris. She toured in the UK in late 2007 supporting M.I.A. on the KALA Tour. Since early 2008 she has also been played in Germany by 1LIVE, first only at night in 1Live Plan B but later, due to high demand, throughout the whole day.

Sokolinski has self-released one EP Not Sokute, and collaborated with The Go! Team and Cornershop, the latter on a song called "Something Makes You Feel Like". She has her own record label called Babycat Records and is signed to Because Music in France.

Sokolinski has had sold-out concerts in Scandinavia, Britain, and Australia. She performed at the Falls Festival at the end of 2008, the Southbound Festival and the Sunset Sounds Festival at the start of 2009. She has performed in the Los Angeles venues Fonda Theatre, Troubadour, Bootleg Theatre, Spaceland, and Echoplex, and has played in support of Pete Doherty, Babyshambles, Kate Nash, Nouvelle Vague, Daniel Johnston, Foster the People, and Johnny Borrell. In San Francisco, she performed at Bottom of the Hill on 15 June 2012. As a live performer, the singer acts unpredictably and never uses a set list; her backing band consists mostly of different friend-musicians at each show. She sometimes plays up to 3 hours by herself, in intimate and quiet venues.

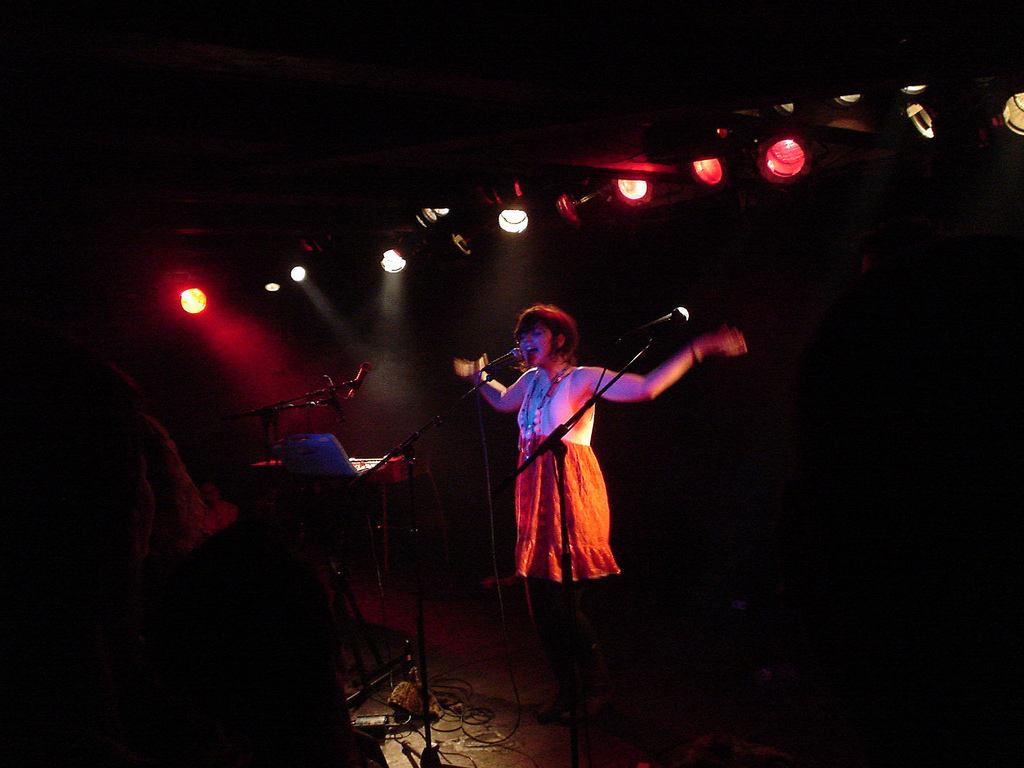
Soko performing at Loppen in Copenhagen, Denmark

On 19 January 2009 Sokolinski stated on her Myspace page that she was quitting music and was 'dead', writing that she was scared of the music industry and wanted to return to acting. Despite having recorded a double album in Seattle, she was not willing to release it. In August of the same year, she declared that she was 'reborn' and writing songs such as "I'm So Ready to Be a Good Man" where she writes:

"in my battle with the demons I just had to die coz they're way too evil and I couldn't fight"

She later referred to the pressure of the music industry, before declaring that she was "having a new heart and being ready to be a new man".

In 2010, her song "I'll Kill Her", was sampled by CeeLo Green on his Stray Bullets mixtape under the track of the same name.

In 2011, she wrote a song and featured in the animated short film Mourir Auprès De Toi, which was co-written and directed by Spike Jonze.

Her debut album, I Thought I Was an Alien, was released in February 2012. She released her first single on YouTube 1 August 2011 entitled "No More Home, No More Love". Two other singles were released "I Thought I Was an Alien" and "First Love Never Die".

In 2014, Soko's song "We Might Be Dead by Tomorrow" was featured in Tatia Pilieva's short video First Kiss. She was also one of the video's twenty subjects. After First Kiss went viral on YouTube, the song debuted at number 9 in the Billboard Hot 100 and number 1 on Billboard's Streaming Songs chart.

In March 2014, Soko appeared in the music video for the song "Jealous" by Canadian electro-funk band Chromeo.

In 2015 "We Might Be Dead by Tomorrow" was also used in an episode of the American TV series Forever.

Her second studio album, My Dreams Dictate My Reality was released in March 2015, with its first single "Who Wears the Pants??" released on 7 January. The Sonic Seducer wrote that the album was darker than the previous releases and called it a "female version of early The Cure discs".

Soko collaborated with The Brian Jonestown Massacre on a song called "Philadelphie Story" for their album Musique de Film Imaginé, released in April 2015.

In 2017, Soko collaborated with Residente on a song called "Desencuentro" for his debut solo album.

In July 2020, Soko released her third studio album, Feel Feelings.

== Acting career ==
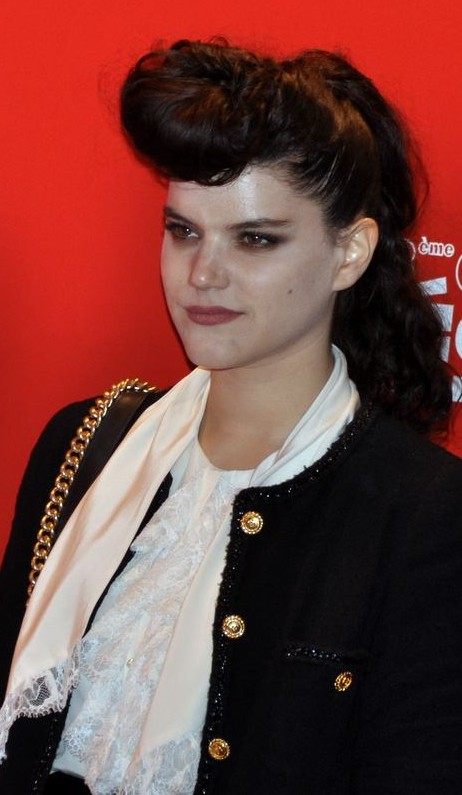
Soko during the 2013 Césars Awards

In February 2010, Soko was nominated for a César Award for Most Promising Actress for her role in À l'origine (English title In the Beginning), directed by Xavier Giannoli.

== Artistry ==
=== Musical style ===
Soko sings primarily in English, which she attributes to the fact that she mostly listens to music in English. Her two favourite bands are the Cure and the Smiths, and the Cure's debut album Three Imaginary Boys is her favourite album. She expressed her dream of collaborating with the two bands' frontmen, Robert Smith and Morrissey, whom she called "my gods"; she also referred to Smith as her "living hero". Other inspirations include Conor Oberst, Joy Division, New Order, and Patti Smith.

Soko has explored several music genres throughout her career. In 2015, she described her own work as "dreamy, punky, new wavey, raw, vital, emotional, very personal lyrics, sad but happy". Her debut album I Thought I Was an Alien was described as "woozy lo-fi alt-pop" influenced by the works of Leonard Cohen and Daniel Johnston, and was noted for its "demo-like rawness". On the other hand, her second album My Dreams Dictate My Reality was labelled as "hi-fi" new wave, goth-pop, and post-punk. Her third album Feel Feelings features her first song with lyrics in French and was compared to the works of Serge Gainsbourg and King Krule. Her lyrics were characterised as "biting" and "poetic yet immediately relatable", while her "husky alto" voice has been described as "throaty, confessional" and "girlishly high-pitch[ed]" with a "raspy edge".

=== Approach to acting ===
Soko finds roles that require physical challenges to be the ones she enjoys the most. For the film On the Ropes (2007), she trained in boxing for a year with French champions. For The Dancer (2016), she insisted on not having a dance double and she therefore trained eight hours a day for three months. She believes that acting helps her have more compassion for things that are unknown to her.

== Personal life ==
Soko became a vegetarian after the death of her father when she was five years old. She explained that it made her realise what a dead body was and she "didn't want to eat anyone's mom or dad or any living creatures". She later transitioned to veganism, which influences her choice of film roles; she said that she would never shoot a scene where she has to eat meat "even if you paid me a million dollars". Soko is a supporter of Black Lives Matter and delayed the release of her album Feel Feelings in 2020 so that it would not divert attention from the George Floyd protests. She considers that being a white ally means being "actively anti-racist". She is straight edge and dyslexic.

=== Sexuality and relationships ===
Soko says that she has always been comfortable with her sexual orientation and "did not really have to come out", not even to her family. In March 2012, she stated that she was bisexual, while she told W Magazine in March 2016 that "I've always been open with my sexuality, meaning I don't really care about gender". In June 2020, she explained that she now considers herself queer: "I called myself bisexual then. 'Queer' wasn't yet an option. And slowly I realised that dating women made me feel so much more like myself, less oppressed, more equal and more empowered."

Soko briefly dated American musician Ariel Pink and they remained friends for several years afterwards. They collaborated on Pink's album Pom Pom (2014) and Soko's album My Dreams Dictate My Reality (2015). However, in April 2015, she described her professional and personal relationship with him as "really hard". She later dated American actress Kristen Stewart for two months before breaking up in May 2016.

Soko said that she "always knew she would be a single mom" and would have a "non-conventional family". On 30 October 2018, she gave birth to a son whose godfather is Australian musician Nick Cave. She experienced denial of pregnancy for the first six months. She is raising her son with her partner Stella Leoni, whom she began dating in 2019. Having moved to Los Angeles in 2008, Soko moved back to Paris with her family in August 2022.

== Discography ==
=== Albums ===
Title	Details	Peak chart positions					
Title	Details	FR	BEL (Vl)	BEL (Wa)	SWI	SWI Rom.	US Heat
I Thought I Was an Alien	Released: 13 February 2012; Label: Because, Babycat; Formats: CD, Vinyl, Digital download	53	76	35	74	39	15
My Dreams Dictate My Reality	Released: 2 March 2015; Label: Because, Babycat; Formats: CD, Vinyl, Music download	75	—	68	—	—	—
Feel Feelings	Released: 10 July 2020; Label: Because, Babycat; Formats: CD, Vinyl, Music download	—	—	—	—	—	—

=== EPs ===
Title	Details
Not Sokute	Released: 11 April 2007; Label: Believe

=== Singles ===
Title	Year	Peak chart positions										Album
Title	Year	FRA	AUT	BEL (FL)	BEL (WA)	CAN Dig.	DEN	SWI	UK	US	US Rock	Album
"I'll Kill Her"	2007	—	—	3	54	—	2	—	—	—	—	Not Sokute
"I Thought I Was an Alien"	2011	173	—	—	—	—	—	—	—	—	—	I Thought I Was an Alien
"First Love Never Die"	2012	130	—	—	66	—	—	—	—	—	—	I Thought I Was an Alien
"We Might Be Dead by Tomorrow"	2012	61	51	—	39	66	—	60	145	9	3	I Thought I Was an Alien
"Love Letter"	2014	—	—	—	—	—	—	—	—	—	—	Non-album single
"Who Wears the Pants??"	2015	—	—	—	—	—	—	—	—	—	—	My Dreams Dictate My Reality
"Ocean of Tears"	2015	—	—	—	—	—	—	—	—	—	—	My Dreams Dictate My Reality
"Sweet Sound of Ignorance"	2017	—	—	—	—	—	—	—	—	—	—	Non-album single
"Diabolo Menthe"	2018	—	—	—	—	—	—	—	—	—	—	Génération(s) Eperdue(s)
"Being Sad Is Not a Crime"	2020	—	—	—	—	—	—	—	—	—	—	Feel Feelings
"Are You a Magician?"	2020	—	—	—	—	—	—	—	—	—	—	Feel Feelings
"Blasphémie"	2020	—	—	—	—	—	—	—	—	—	—	Feel Feelings
"Oh, To Be a Rainbow!"	2020	—	—	—	—	—	—	—	—	—	—	Feel Feelings
"Looking For Love"	2020	—	—	—	—	—	—	—	—	—	—	Feel Feelings

=== Guest performances ===
Title	Year	Album	Other artist(s)
"Gunhild"	2010	Who Killed Harry Houdini?	I'm from Barcelona
"Why"	2016	Washed Away	Rooney
"Desencuentro"	2017	Residente	Residente
"Keep You Close"	2018	Pink Cloud	Launder
"Diabolo Menthe"	2018	Génération(s) Eperdue(s)	—N/a
"Obsession"	2018	Non-album single	Sam Spiegel
"Become"	2022	Happening	Launder

== Filmography ==
Year	Title	Role	Notes
2003	L'escalier	Béa	Short
2003	P.J.	Anouchka	TV series (1 Episode)
2003	Action Justice	Léa Franqui	TV series (1 Episode)
2004	Au secours, j'ai 30 ans !	Chloé	
2004	Ben et Thomas	The girl	Short
2004	Clara cet été là	Zoé	TV movie
2005	Palais royal!	The hairdresser	
2005	On s'appelle	Various	TV series (4 Episodes)
2005-08	Commissaire Valence	Camille Valence	TV series (3 Episodes)
2006	Girlfriends	Manon	
2006	Madame Irma	The high school girl	
2006	Les irréductibles	Lucie	
2006	Oh ! Ma femme	Clémentine	Short
2006	Poésie del amor	Margot	Short
2006	Louis Page	Lydia	TV series (1 Episode)
2007	Dans les cordes	Sandra	
2007	Ma place au soleil	Sabine	
2007	Ma vie n'est pas une comédie romantique	Lisa	
2007	Les diablesses	Denise	TV movie
2008	Adrien	Sandra	TV movie
2009	In the Beginning	Monika	Nominated - César Award for Most Promising Actress
2011	Mourir auprès de toi	Mina	Short
2012	Augustine	Augustine	Mar del Plata International Film Festival - Best Actress; Women Film Critics Circle - Courage in Acting Award; Nominated - Lumière Award for Most Promising Actress; Nominated - Prix Romy Schneider
2012	Bye Bye Blondie	Young Gloria	
2012	Fat Bottomed Girls Rule the World	Joséphine	Short
2013	Friends from France	Carole	
2013	Her	Voice of Isabella	
2014	First Kiss	Marianna Palka's Kisser	Short
2014	Artbound		TV series (1 Episode)
2015	Always Worthy	Alvin	
2015	Hi How Are You Daniel Johnston	Dream Laurie	Short
2015	I Still Chose to Stay	Woman	Short
2016	The Dancer	Loie Fuller	Nominated - César Award for Best Actress; Nominated - Lumière Award for Best Actress
2016	The Stopover	Marine	
2020	A Good Man	Aude	
2020	Little Fish	Samantha	
2021	The Blazing World	Margot	
2021	Mayday	Gert	
