= Revolver (French band) =

French pop rock band

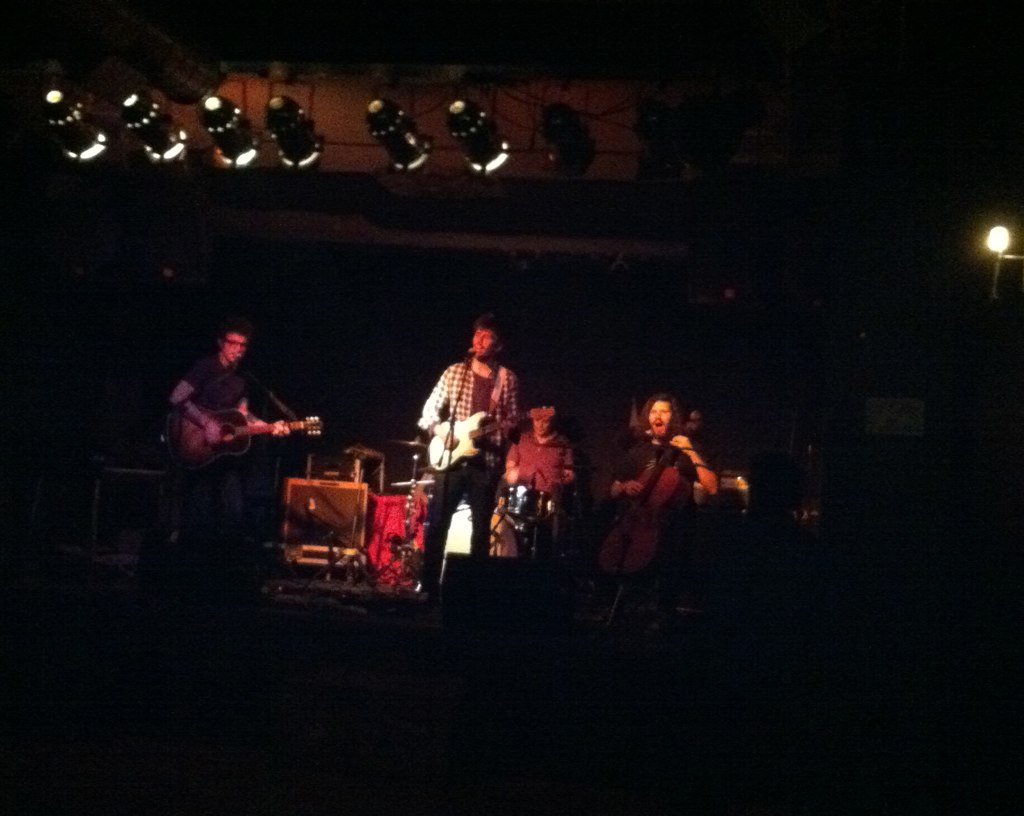
- Revolver performing in Pittsburgh, Pennsylvania, USA, October 2011

Background information
- Origin: Paris, France
- Genres: Pop rock
- Years active: 2006–present
- Labels: Delabel/EMI(Europe). Astralwerks (US)
- Members: Ambroise Willaume (vocals, guitar, piano); Christophe Musset (vocals, guitar); Jérémie Arcache (cello, vocals)
- Website: http://www.revolvermusic.tv/

Revolver is a French pop rock band, formed in Paris, in September 2006.

== Band ==
The group consists of:

- Ambroise Willaume - Vocals, guitar, piano
- Christophe Musset - Vocals, guitar
- Jérémie Arcache - Cello, vocals
- (Maxime Garoute - Drums)

== Beginnings ==
Christophe Musset (vocals, guitar) and Ambroise Willaume (vocals, guitar, piano), joined by Jérémie Arcache (cello, backing vocals), composed their first songs in an apartment in Paris. Unable to make too much noise, they focused on their vocals and played mainly acoustic instruments, describing their music as "pop de chambre" due to its similarities with chamber music ("musique de chambre" in French). Performing in small venues such as bars and friends' apartments, the band was discovered and signed by the Parisian label Delabel/EMI, releasing the Pop de chambre EP in early 2008. In June 2009, they recorded their first LP Music for a While. Revolver toured France in 2009 with a few dates in Germany and Switzerland, adding percussionist Maxime Garoute and using more electric guitar in their live performances.

Although they sing in English, they were nominated twice at the French Music Awards "Les Victoires de la Musique" in March 2010, for "Révélation album" (Best Debut Album) and "Révélation Scène" (Best New Live Act).

== Influences ==
- They chose English from the beginning because, being influenced by the Beatles, Elliott Smith, Neil Young, Radiohead, Simon & Garfunkel, The Kinks etc. it is the language in which their writing comes most naturally. In addition, it is easier to use harmonies in English than in French in pop music.
- Jérémie has hardly ever listened to pop, he says it is Mozart, especially the Magic Flute which gave him the desire to become a musician, Christopher and Ambroise make him listen to pop more often and took him to see Radiohead at Bercy in 2008 so that he would truly discover it. On the other hand Christophe admits he never listened to classical music. It was only with the group that he started listening to Bach.
- Ambroise and Christophe say it is Elliott Smith that gave them the desire to get into the music and Christophe was listening to Jean-Jacques Goldman as a child. Ambroise meanwhile, said he also loves kitsch stuff, such as Elton John, ABBA or the Bee Gees. They also meet every three to another point: for them is Radiohead the "greatest band in the world".
- Their music is a bridge between pop and classical music or even the Renaissance or the Baroque and influence everything from Beatles to Bach, from Benjamin Britten to Elliott Smith. In the group Ambroise is the bridge between Christopher and Jérémie because he is the only one with a culture that is both classic and pop.

Songs that the group have covered during their performances include:

- "This Boy", "Because" and "With a Little Help from My Friends" by The Beatles
- "Can't Help Falling in Love" by Elvis Presley
- "Helplessly Hoping" by Crosby, Stills & Nash
- "I Only Have Eyes for You" by The Flamingos
- "Balulalow" from A Ceremony of Carols by Benjamin Britten which Jérémie and Ambroise sang in chorus to the Master of Notre Dame de Paris when they were children.
- "Nevertheless (I'm in Love with You)" by The Mills Brothers
- "Monk" by Mini Mansions

== Discography ==
=== Albums ===
- 2009 : Music for a While
  - 2010 : Music for a While (re-edited with 5 bonus tracks on a second CD)
- 2012 : Let Go

=== EPs ===
- 2008 : Pop de chambre
- 2011 : Parallel Lives

=== Singles ===
- 2009: "Get Around Town"
- 2010: "Balulalow"
- 2010: "Leave Me Alone"
- 2012: "Wind Song"
