= First Kiss (2014 film) =

- Directed by: Tatia Pilieva
- Starring: Natalia Bonifacci; Luke Cook; Corby Griesenbeck; Jill Larson; Marianna Palka; Karim Saleh; Ingrid Schram; Nicole Simone; Soko; Elisabetta Tedla
- Cinematography: Andre Lascaris
- Edited by: Garret Price
- Music by: Soko
- Release date: 10 March 2014
- Running time: 3 min
- Country: United States
- Language: English

First Kiss is a 2014 American short film directed and produced by Tatia Pilieva. The film has music composed by Soko.

The project was born of PIlieva's collection of photographs of herself and husband cinematographer Andre Lascaris kissing over the years of their relationship. It inspired the idea of capturing first kisses on film, and the idea came to life when Pilieva's friend Melissa Coker, the fashion designer behind WREN, reached out about doing a film short to promote her Fall 2014 collection. Pilieva recruited 20 single friends, dressed in WREN, to meet and kiss for the first time on set as five cameras rolled continuously. Launched online on March 11, 2014, the three-and-a-half-minute short film went viral and as of May 17, 2014, had 59 million views. As of July 27, 2023, the video has over 151.7 million views.

Some backlash emerged when viewers learned the film was a clothing ad, although the company was mentioned in the opening and closing credits. WREN sales increased by almost 14,000 percent.

== Cast ==
- Jill Larson
- Marianna Palka
- Soko
- Natalia Bonifacci
- Luke Cook
- Corby Griesenbeck
- Karim Saleh
- Ingrid Schram
- Nicole Simone
- Elisabetta Tedla
