= List of people from Ridgewood, New Jersey =

People who were born in, residents of, or otherwise closely associated with Ridgewood, New Jersey include:

== A ==
- Jim Alexander (born 1935), documentary photographer, photojournalist and activist
- Elizabeth Akers Allen (1832–1911), poet and journalist
- Joe Antonacci (born 1960), boxing ring announcer and emcee

== B ==
- David Baas (born 1981), offensive lineman who played for the New York Giants
- Adam Badeau (1831–1895), Union Army brevet brigadier general and author
- Robert T. Bakker (born 1945), paleontologist, whose research helped support the theory that some dinosaurs were warm-blooded
- MC Paul Barman (born 1974), rapper
- Amelia Edith Huddleston Barr (1831–1919), British novelist
- Guy Benson (born 1985), conservative talk radio personality who has been a Fox News contributor
- Dale Berra (born 1956), former MLB player who primarily played as an infielder from 1977 to 1987 and is the son of Hall of Fame catcher Yogi Berra
- Andy Blitz (born 1971), comedian, writer, producer and actor best known for his sketch comedy and writing work on the late-night talk show Late Night with Conan O'Brien
- Jeffrey Blitz, filmmaker who directed the 2002 documentary Spellbound and the 2007 film Rocket Science
- Jim Bouton (1939–2019), former Major League Baseball pitcher who wrote the tell-all book Ball Four
- Dave Butler (born 1987), former American football linebacker who played for the Cleveland Browns
- Phillip Bush (born 1961), classical pianist, with a career focusing primarily on chamber music and contemporary classical music
- Brenda Buttner (1961–2017), senior business correspondent and host of Bulls & Bears on Fox News
- John Chester Buttre (1821–1893), steel-plate engraver and lithographer, responsible for some 3,000 engraved portraits of American political, naval and military personalities
- Martha Byrne (born 1969), actress who performed on Broadway as a child in Annie and as an adult in the role of Lily Walsh in As the World Turns

== C ==
- Peter Carlisle (born 1952), formerly mayor of Honolulu
- Carolyn Christov-Bakargiev (born 1957), writer, art historian and curator who was the artistic director of dOCUMENTA (13)
- Harlan Coben (born 1962), The New York Times best-selling author of Promise Me, Tell No One and No Second Chance
- Tabatha Coffey (born 1967), contestant (and Fan Favorite winner) on season one of Bravo's Shear Genius and host of Tabatha's Salon Takeover
- Leonard A. Cole (1933–2022), dentist, political scientist and expert on bioterrorism and terror medicine
- Jerry Coleman (1924–2014), former second baseman for the New York Yankees, baseball sportscaster
- Carin Cone (born 1940, class of 1958), former competition swimmer who was a 1956 Olympic silver medalist and a former world record-holder
- Kelly Conheeney (born 1991), soccer player who plays as a midfielder for Sky Blue FC in the NWSL
- Christopher J. Connors (born 1956), politician who represents the 9th district in the New Jersey Senate
- Paul M. Cook (1924–2020), founder and CEO of Raychem, a chemical manufacturing company that reached $2 billion in annual revenue
- Martin Courtney (born 1985), musician, singer, member of American indie rock band Real Estate
- Megan Crane (born c. 1973), novelist

== D ==
- Andy Daly (born 1971), actor, comedian and writer best known for starring as Forrest MacNeil on the Comedy Central series Review
- Toshiko D'Elia (1930–2014), masters athletics long-distance runner
- Meghan Daum (born 1970), author who writes for the Los Angeles Times
- Louis W. Dawson (1896–1989), lawyer and insurance executive who served as president of the Mutual Life Insurance Company of New York
- Barbara Demick, author of Nothing to Envy
- Todd Demsey (born 1972), professional golfer
- Fairleigh Dickinson Jr. (1919–1996), member of the New Jersey Senate from 1968 to 1971 who sponsored the 1969 legislation that created the Hackensack Meadowlands Development Commission
- Anne Donovan (1961–2018), three-time basketball All-American at Old Dominion University and three-time Olympic team member. Ranked No. 8 on the Sports Illustrated list of The 50 Greatest New Jersey Sports Figures
- Charles L. Drake (1924–1997), geologist who was professor of geology at Dartmouth College
- Gerry Duggan (born 1974), comic book writer
- Fred DuVal (born 1954), businessman, civic leader, and author who is vice president of Clean Energy Fuels and was the Democratic nominee in the 2014 Arizona gubernatorial election

== E ==
- W. Cary Edwards (1944–2010), former member of the New Jersey General Assembly who served as New Jersey Attorney General from 1986 to 1989
- Niles Eldredge (born 1943), paleontologist

== F ==
- Jeff Feagles (born 1966), Punter for the National Football League New York Giants
- Mike Ferguson (born 1970), politician who served as member of the United States House of Representatives representing New Jersey's 7th congressional district from 2001 to 2009
- Josh Flitter (born 1994), child actor who appeared in Ace Ventura Jr.: Pet Detective
- Ray Forrest (1916–1999), pioneering TV announcer, host and news broadcaster from the early TV era
- Varian Fry (1907–1967), journalist who helped save 2,000 to 4,000 anti-Nazi and Jewish refugees from persecution and deportation in Vichy France during The Holocaust, most notably the French artist Marc Chagall

== G ==
- Louis Gambaccini (1931–2018), transportation official who served as general manager of the Port Authority Trans Hudson rail system and as New Jersey Commissioner of Transportation
- Bill Geist (born 1945), correspondent on CBS News Sunday Morning
- Arnold Gingrich (1903–1976), editor and co-founder of Esquire magazine
- John P. Ginty (born 1965), financial data analyst and politician who was a candidate in 2006 for the Republican nomination for U.S. Senate
- Gina Glantz (born c. 1943), political strategist, campaign manager, field director and consultant
- Abraham Godwin (1724–1777), one of the first settlers of the area around Ridgewood
- Abraham Godwin (1763–1835), brigadier general in the War of 1812, for whom Godwinville was named
- Abraham Godwin Jr. (1791–1849), worked to name part of Franklin as Godwinville
- Roger Curtis Green (1932–2009), archaeologist of South Pacific civilizations

== H ==
- Joe Harasymiak (born 1986), head coach for the Maine Black Bears football team
- Elizabeth Hawes (1903–1971), clothing designer, outspoken critic of the fashion industry and champion of ready to wear
- Daniel Henninger (born 1945/46), The Wall Street Journal columnist
- Jason Heyward (born 1989), outfielder for the Chicago Cubs, including member of their 2016 World Series championship team.

== I ==
- Sonny Igoe (1923–2012), jazz drummer

== J ==
- Cosmo Jarvis (born 1989), singer-songwriter
- Frankie Jonas (born 2000), actor who was a voice actor in the film Ponyo and a recurring character in the television series Jonas
- Margaret Juntwait (1957–2015), the voice of the Metropolitan Opera radio broadcasts

== K ==
- Jay Kennedy (1956–2007), editor and writer who joined King Features Syndicate in 1988 as deputy comics editor and was named as editor-in-chief in 1997
- Walter M. D. Kern (1937–1998), politician who served in the New Jersey General Assembly from 1978 to 1990, where he represented the 40th district
- Grace Kim (born 1968), former professional tennis player
- Peter S. Kim (born 1958), president of Merck Research Laboratories
- Richard Kollmar (1910–1971), stage, radio, film and television actor, television personality and Broadway producer
- Younghoe Koo (born 1994), NFL kicker who has played for the Atlanta Falcons
- Bowie Kuhn (1926–2007), Commissioner of Baseball from 1969 to 1984
- L.A. Beast (born 1984 as Kevin Strahle), competitive eater

== L ==
- Jeffrey M. Lacker (born 1955), president of the Federal Reserve Bank of Richmond
- Mike Laga (born 1960), Major League Baseball player from 1982 to 1990
- John Lantigua (born 1947), journalist and crime novelist who has won the Pulitzer Prize and Robert F. Kennedy Journalism Award for his investigative reporting on Latin American issues
- Robert Sean Leonard (born 1969), Tony Award-winning actor and regular in TV series House Currently resides in Ridgewood with his family.
- Cornelis Lievense (1890–1949), Dutch businessman who ran several import/export companies in the United States from the 1920s through the 1940s
- Barbara Love (1937–2022), feminist writer and the editor of Feminists who Changed America, 1963–1975
- Alfred Lutter (born 1962), actor and consultant best known for his performances in Alice Doesn't Live Here Anymore and The Bad News Bears

== M ==
- Martha MacCallum (born 1964), news anchor on Fox News Channel
- Herbert F. Maddalene (born 1928), architect who was a partner in the firm of Genovese & Maddalene
- David Madden (born 1981), founder and executive director of both the National History Bee and the National History Bowl who was a 19-day champion on Jeopardy!
- Paul Mara (born 1979), National Hockey League defenceman who has played for the Montreal Canadiens and New York Rangers
- Marion Clyde McCarroll (1891–1977), writer and journalist who was the first woman issued a press pass by the New York Stock Exchange and also penned the "Advice for the Lovelorn, a nationally syndicated column, after she inherited it from Dorothy Dix
- Thomas B. McGuire Jr. (1920–1945), the second-leading air ace in World War II, who was killed in action on January 7, 1945, and awarded the Medal of Honor posthumously. McGuire Air Force Base is named in his memory
- Joseph McKenna (born 1995), freestyle and graduated folkstyle wrestler
- Julia Meade (1925–2016), film and stage actress who was a frequent pitch person in live commercials in the early days of television in the 1950s, most notably on The Ed Sullivan Show
- Michael Mercurio (born 1972), actor who has appeared in film, theatre and television, often portraying psychologically disturbed characters
- Matt Mondanile (born 1985), guitarist, singer and songwriter
- Elisabeth Moore (1876–1959), tennis player who won the singles title at the U.S. Championships on four occasions and was inducted into the International Tennis Hall of Fame in 1971
- Richard Muenz (born 1948), actor and baritone singer best known for his theatrical work

== N ==
- Helen Nearing (1904–1995), author and advocate of simple living
- Pete Nelson (born 1962), master treehouse builder, author and host of the Animal Planet television show Treehouse Masters
- Janet Warren Neslen (1924–?), public health physician
- Kim Ng (born 1968), senior vice-president for baseball operations of Major League Baseball
- Buddy Nielsen (born 1984), singer of the rock band Senses Fail
- Tom Nolan, publisher of Golf World
- Jeffrey Nordling (born 1962), actor known for Dirt, 24, Desperate Housewives and Big Little Lies

== O ==
- Helen O'Bannon (1939–1988), economist who served as the secretary of public welfare of Pennsylvania
- John Joseph O'Hara (born 1946), auxiliary bishop of the Roman Catholic Archdiocese of New York
- Patti O'Reilly (born 1968), former professional tennis player
- Evanka Osmak (born 1980), sports anchor for Sportsnet
- Richard and Joan Ostling (born 1940 and 1939–2009 respectively), co-authors of Mormon America: The Power and the Promise

== P ==
- Nikki Phillips (born 1987), American-born Polish soccer defender and midfielder who has played with FC Kansas City in the NWSL and for the Poland national team
- Patricia Peardon (1923/24–1993), actress who originated the title role in the Broadway play Junior Miss
- Jack Pitney (1963–2010), marketing executive with BMW as vice president of marketing, where he played a major role in convincing company leadership to go ahead with distribution of the MINI in the United States, despite concerns that car buyers there would not buy cars that small given the popularity of sport utility vehicles

== R ==
- Cassie Ramone (born 1986) and Katy Goodman of the indie rock band Vivian Girls
- William Remington (1917–1954), Soviet spy convicted of perjury
- Amanda Renee, romance novelist
- Chico Resch (born 1948), hockey sportscaster and former NHL goalie who lived in the village when he played for the New Jersey Devils
- Bobby Richardson (born 1935), former second baseman for the New York Yankees
- Nelson Riddle (1921–1985), musician and arranger for various artists such as Frank Sinatra and Ella Fitzgerald
- Beatrice Schroeder Rose (1922–2014), author, composer, harpist and teacher, who was the principal harpist of the Houston Symphony for 31 years
- Eric S. Rosengren (born 1957), President of the Federal Reserve Bank of Boston
- Marge Roukema (1929–2014), politician who served as a member of the United States House of Representatives
- Henry Rowan (1923–2015), engineer and philanthropist, for whom Rowan University was renamed, after he made a $100 million donation to the school

== S ==
- Bob Sall (1908–1974), race car driver who drove in the 1935 Indianapolis 500 and was inducted into the National Sprint Car Hall of Fame in 1992
- Mitchell Saron (born 2000), sabre fencer, who will represent the United States at the 2024 Summer Olympics in Paris
- Scottie Scheffler (born 1996), professional and current world #1 golfer who plays on the PGA Tour
- Sean Schimmel (born 1969), swimming coach who competed for the University of Southern California
- David Schenker (born 1968), diplomat who has served as Assistant Secretary of State for Near Eastern Affairs
- Thelma Schoonmaker (born 1940), film editor, best known for her collaboration over five decades with director Martin Scorsese
- Kieran Scott (born 1974), author of Private and I Was a Non-Blonde Cheerleader
- Bob Sebra (born 1961), MLB player for the Texas Rangers, Montreal Expos, Philadelphia Phillies, Cincinnati Reds and the Milwaukee Brewers
- Irving Selikoff (1915–1992), physician and medical researcher who in the 1960s established a link between the inhalation of asbestos particles and lung-related ailments, whose work is largely responsible for the current strict regulation of asbestos
- Jordin Sparks (born 1989), American Idol winner, lived here as a child while her father played with the Giants
- Phillippi Sparks (born 1969), former NFL cornerback who played most of his career with the New York Giants
- Michael Springer (born 1979), former MLL player
- Ali Stroker (born 1987), actress, singer and winner of the 2019 Tony Award for Best Featured Actress in a Musical for her performance as Ado Annie in "Oklahoma". She is the first actress who needs a wheelchair for mobility known to have appeared on a Broadway stage

== U ==
- Sub Urban (born 1999), singer, songwriter and producer best known for his song "Cradles"

== T ==
- Kyle Teel (born 2002), professional baseball catcher in the Chicago White Sox organization
- Wayne Tippit (1932–2009), character actor who appeared in Melrose Place and lived in Ridgewood until 1990

== V ==
- Casper Van Dien (born 1968), actor, Starship Troopers, Sleepy Hollow. Van Dien Avenue is named for his great-great-great-grandfather
- Don Van Natta Jr. (born 1964), journalist and writer who has been an investigative reporter for ESPN and had been an investigative correspondent at The New York Times, where he was a member of two teams that won Pulitzer Prizes
- David Van Tieghem (born 1955), percussionist, composer and sound designer

== W ==
- Charles Wadsworth (1917–2002), painter, printmaker and poet
- Melinda Wagner (born 1957), composer, winner of the 1999 Pulitzer Prize in music
- Ayelet Waldman (born 1964), Israeli-American novelist and essayist, who has written seven mystery novels in the series The Mommy-Track Mysteries and four other novels
- Bill Ward (1919–1998), cartoonist notable as a good girl artist and creator of the risqué comics character Torchy
- Douglas Watt (1914–2009), theater critic for the Daily News
- Bill Wielechowski (born 1967), member of the Alaska Senate, representing the J District since 2006
- Brian Williams (born 1959), journalist
- George Witte, poet and book editor

== Z ==
- Michael Zegen (born 1979), actor best known for his role as Joel Maisel on The Marvelous Mrs. Maisel
- Jeremy Zoll, general manager of the Minnesota Twins of Major League Baseball
