= Shear Genius season 2 =

Shear Genius
- Season 2
- No. of contestants: 12
- Winner: Dee
- No. of episodes: 10

Release
- Original release: June 25 – August 27, 2008

Season chronology
- ← Previous; Season 1 Next → Season 3

The second season of Shear Genius premiered June 25, 2008 on Bravo. This season features 12 stylists competing in various challenges to be declared the winner of Shear Genius. Jaclyn Smith and Rene Fris returned as the host and mentor respectively. Sally Hershberger and Michael Carl were replaced by Kim Vo and Kelly Atterton as judges.

== Contestants ==
Contestant	Age	Hometown
Charlie Price	38	Denver, CO
Daniel Lewis	28	Dallas, TX
Dee Adames	37	Miami, FL
Gail Soifer	25	Columbus, OH
Glenn Mitchell	36	Decatur, AL
Matthew Tully	37	Dallas, TX
Meredith Spiros	36	Chicago, IL
Nekisa Addis	29	Concord, CA
Nicole Obert	24	New York, NY
Oshun Smith	31	Los Angeles
Parker Plotkin	32	West Palm Beach, FL
Paulo Candido	37	San Jose, CA

== Episode progress ==
Elimination Challenges
Shortcut; Winner	Dee	Charlie	Matt	Dee	Nicole	Charlie	Paulo	Daniel	Nicole	None	
Stylists	1	2	3	4	5	6	7	8	9	10	Episode
Dee	IN	HIGH	IN	HIGH	IN	IN	WIN	HIGH	LOW	WINNER	Shear Genius
Charlie	HIGH	WIN	WIN	LOW	LOW	IN	LOW	WIN	WIN	CUT	Cut: Finale Runner-Up
Nicole	IN	IN	LOW	HIGH	HIGH	IN	IN	LOW	IN	CUT	Cut: Finale 2nd-Runner Up
Daniel	WIN	IN	IN	IN	IN	IN	HIGH	HIGH	CUT		Cut: Avant-Garde
Paulo	IN	LOW	LOW	IN	WIN	IN	LOW	CUT			Cut: Surprise!
Nekisa	HIGH	IN	IN	LOW	LOW	LOW	CUT				Cut: Every Dog Has Its Day
Glenn	IN	HIGH	HIGH	WIN	IN	CUT					Cut: Hair From Heaven
Gail	LOW	LOW	HIGH	IN	CUT						Cut: It Looks Like a Helmet
Meredith	IN	IN	IN	CUT							Cut: Do It Yourself
Matthew	LOW	IN	CUT								Cut: Red Carpet Worthy?
Parker	IN	CUT									Cut: The Best Oranges in the County
Oshun	CUT										Cut: In the Dark

(WINNER) The stylist won the series and was crowned Shear Genius.
(WIN) The stylist won that episode's Elimination Challenge.
(HIGH) The stylist was selected as one of the top entries in the Elimination Challenge, but did not win.
(LOW) The stylist was selected as one of the bottom entries in the Elimination Challenge, but was not eliminated.
(LOW) The stylist was in the bottom two for the Elimination Challenge.
(CUT) The stylist lost this week's Elimination Challenge and was out of the competition.
(IN) The stylist neither won nor lost that week's Elimination Challenge.

- In Episode 6, the judges didn't choose a winner for the elimination challenge. Later, Charlie won the shortcut challenge and did not participate in the elimination challenge.
- In Episode 9, Nicole won the short cut challenge so she was given immunity at the elimination challenge.

== Episode recaps ==
=== Episode 1: In the Dark ===
First Aired: June 25, 2008

Short Cut Challenge: Each stylist is to cut their client's hair while blindfolded. They are given five minutes to discuss the style with their client first (without blindfolds) and forty-five minutes to cut. Clients are given safety glasses to wear during the challenge. The stylists are ranked in order by judge Kim Vo based on their technique.

1. Dee
2. Nicole
3. Meredith
4. Glenn
5. Daniel
6. Gail
7. Charlie
8. Matthew
9. Paulo
10. Parker
11. Nekisa
12. Oshun

WINNER: Dee

Elimination Challenge: Based on the order from the Short Cut challenge, each stylist selects a model and their selected cartoon character. The characters represented are Wilma Flintstone, Judy Jetson, Betty Boop, Lucy van Pelt, Jem, and Marge Simpson; each is represented twice to allow comparison between two different styles. They are given two hours to complete a style based on the cartoon character, and are judged on creativity, technical skills, and their interpretation of the style. Charlie, Nekisa and Daniel were in the top three, with Charlie third, Nekisa second and Daniel the winner.

- WINNER: Daniel
- CUT: Oshun

Judges: Jaclyn Smith, Kim Vo, Kelly Atterton, Neeko

=== Episode 2: The Best Oranges in the County ===
First Aired: July 2, 2008

Short Cut Challenge: Each stylist was to create a sexy short cut style from the various models within 45 minutes; the winner of the previous episode's elimination challenge (Daniel) selected his client first, and then selected the order of the other clients. Nicole and Charlie are deemed the best by Tabatha, while Paulo and Nekisa end up as the bottom 2, with Nekisa being the worst cut.

WINNER: Charlie

Elimination Challenge: Each stylist was assigned one of The Real Housewives of Orange County stars, and was to create a new look for the model that incorporated coloring changes while still putting their own touches in the style and respecting their client's wishes. To select clients, each stylist selected a numbered orange prior to the challenge at their house, and these were matched with similarly numbered oranges held by the Housewives.

- WINNER: Charlie
- CUT: Parker

Judges: Jaclyn Smith, Kim Vo, Kelly Atterton, Tabatha Coffey (from Shear Genius (Season 1))

=== Episode 3: Red Carpet Worthy? ===
First Aired: July 9, 2008

Short Cut Challenge: Each stylist was to create a technical masterpiece on their clients, whose hair ranged from thirty to over sixty inches. They had to create these masterpieces without cutting any hair from their client's hair. The stylists also had a selection of accessories to choose from, and had to incorporate at least one accessory into their hairstyle. The accessories included flowers, pearl necklace strands, marble pens and tiaras. The winner would have the advantage of having first client choice, and determining the order in which his or her fellow stylists would choose their respective clients. Matthew and Charlie do the best in the challenge, and Matthew wins. Nekisa and Nicole do the worst in the challenge, and Nekisa is deemed the worst cut because of the absence of an accessory in her hairstyle.

WINNER: Matthew

Elimination Challenge: The stylists had to choose a red carpet dress, in the order that Matthew decided for them to choose. After this they had to create a hairdo which would be suitable for a red carpet event. The hair designs were judged at an actual red carpet. This would allow to see if the hair would hold up for an actual event, or if it would fall short of being Shear Genius.

- WINNER: Charlie
- CUT: Matthew

Judges: Jaclyn Smith, Kim Vo, Mark Townsend, Alison Sweeney

=== Episode 4: Do It Yourself ===
First Aired: July 16, 2008

Short Cut Challenge The stylists were tasked with not only working upon their own client, but upon the clients of the other stylists. After a certain amount of time, the stylists would be asked to stop working on their client, and the client would be juggled to a different stylist as instructed. The stylists could then either pick up off of where the previous stylist left off, or choose to start something completely new. To determine their first client, the stylists were given scissor boxes with different colored combs in them, and the client with the matching comb of the stylist would be the stylists' first client. Dee and Daniel were chosen as the top 2 with the best end results. Meredith and Nekisa were the bottom 2 and Meredith was called the worst.

WINNER: Dee

Elimination Challenge: The stylists are challenged to create a hairstyle for a client, that the client can replicate at home by themselves. The stylists are given time to teach their client the hairstyle they gave them. The next day, the clients come back to the Shear Genius salon and re-create to their best ability, the hair-do their respective stylist gave them the previous day. The stylists are not allowed to help the clients whatsoever. Glenn, Nicole, and Dee do the best while Glenn wins. Charlie, Nekisa, and Meredith are in the bottom 3 and Charlie is first safe due to his immunity for his win last week. Nekisa and Meredith landed in the bottom 2, and Meredith's safeness gets her eliminated.

- WINNER: Glenn
- CUT: Meredith

Judges: Jaclyn Smith, Kim Vo, Kelly Atterton, Roy Teeluck

=== Episode 5: It Looks Like a Helmet ===
First Aired: July 23, 2008

Short Cut Challenge The stylists first chose a sandal that had a number on it, then the stylists made their way to the beach and realized that the numbers would correspond to the models. The stylists were asked to cut the surfers' hair as they came straight from the ocean, with no proper wash. Glenn and Daniel were the worse two but Glenn was called the worst for the day. Dee and Nicole did the best and Nicole won the short cut challenge.

WINNER: Nicole

Elimination Challenge: Because Nicole won the short cut challenge, she had first choice of client and got to decide the order in the elimination challenge. The order is as follows:

1. Paulo
2. Nekisa
3. Charlie
4. Gail
5. Daniel
6. Dee
7. Glenn

The stylists had to cut wigs for people with Alopecia. Nicole got really emotional during the time she had, and didn't care if she got eliminated, because the customer was more important than the competition. Nicole and Paulo were the top 2. Paulo won the challenge, while Charlie, Nekisa, and Gail were the bottom 3. Charlie lands in the bottom 2 with Gail but is spared and Gail is eliminated.

- WINNER: Paulo
- CUT: Gail

Judges: Jaclyn Smith, Kim Vo, Kelly Atterton

=== Episode 6: Hair From Heaven ===
First Aired: July 30, 2008

Short Cut Challenge: The stylists had four hours to dye their clients hair a vibrant rainbow color. Kim Vo judged them. Nekisa and Paulo did the worst in the challenge, but Paulo was called the worst of the day. Dee and Charlie did the best, and Charlie won.

Winner: Charlie

Elimination Challenge: The stylists were paired in 3 teams of 2 to work on customers who want hair from the show Charlie's Angels. Because Charlie won the Quick Cut Challenge, he decided the teams and did not take part in the challenge. The teams are:

- Nekisa and Dee
- Glenn and Nicole
- Daniel and Paulo

Nobody seemed to do well and no one won the elimination challenge. Nekisa's hair for Farrah and Glenn's hair for Jaclyn landed them in the bottom 2. Jaclyn Smith said she wouldn't wear the Jaclyn hair back then or now. The judges said that the Farrah hair was too safe but it was better than the Jaclyn style so Nekisa stayed and Glenn was cut.

- WINNER: None
- CUT: Glenn

Judges: Jaclyn Smith, Kim Vo, Kelly Atterton, Kate Jackson

=== Episode 7: Every Dog Has Its Day ===
First Aired: August 6, 2008

Short Cut Challenge: The stylists were to create unique, futuristic hairstyles using natural food ingredients found in the kitchen, such as honey, flour, salt, egg whites and peanut butter. Nicole was declared the worst cut. Paulo, Dee, and Daniel did the best.

Winner: Paulo

Elimination Challenge: The stylists were responsible for not only grooming a dog, but also to style their client's hair to resemble their dog.

Nekisa received criticism for the styles of her dog and client's hair not resembling one another. Charlie was also criticized for making his client look both matronly and crazy at the same time.

- WINNER: Dee
- CUT: Nekisa

Judges: Jaclyn Smith, Kim Vo, Kelly Atterton, Jennifer McCarthy.

=== Episode 8: Surprise! ===
First Aired: August 13, 2008

Short Cut Challenge: The stylists were asked to create back-to-school hairstyles on five-year-old clients. The look had to be age-appropriate as well as easy to manage. Daniel and Charlie did the best in the challenge, while Dee and Paulo were the bottom 2.

Winner: Daniel

Judge: Dean Banowetz

Elimination Challenge: Family members of the stylists were brought in as the clients. However, each stylist was to work on a family member of a competitor, rather than their own. The challenge was to improve upon the client's current hairstyle. As the winner of the Short Cut Challenge, Daniel decided the pairs.

- Charlie: Daniel's mother
- Daniel: Nicole's mother
- Nicole: Dee's mother
- Dee Paulo's cousin
- Paulo Charlie's sister

- Winner: Charlie
- Cut: Paulo

Judges: Jaclyn Smith, Kim Vo, Kelly Atterton, David Babaii

=== Episode 9: Avant-Garde ===
First Aired: August 20, 2008

Short Cut Challenge: The stylists used the scissor boxes to determine the order of picking clients. The stylists had to make a look that would fit their clients personality after they got to know them a little bit. Then, a bit later the stylists found out they were "double-booked", and that they had to make a different look for their clients' identical twin. The winner was revealed to earn a permanent spot in the final 3.

Winner: Nicole

Judge: José Eber

Elimination Challenge: In four photo shoots depicting each of the four seasons, the stylists had to style their models' hair in an avant-garde look for a photo shoot that also corresponded with the season. The seasons go as follows:

- Charlie: Spring
- Daniel: Summer
- Dee: Autumn
- Nicole: Winter

- Winner: Charlie
- Cut: Daniel

Judges: Jaclyn Smith, Kim Vo, Linda Wells, Michael Grecco

- Charlie was the Second person to win 2 Elimination challenges in a row (this happened twice) behind Daisy from season 1.

=== Episode 10: Finale ===
First Aired: August 27, 2008

Short Cut Challenge: None

Final Challenge: Each stylist is given three hours to cut and style four models. They were tasked with creating looks to tell the story of one woman during the ages eighteen, thirty, forty-five, and sixty in her life. Each stylist chose a scissor box which held a lock of hair, indicating the hair color of the models they would be working with.

- Charlie: Blond
- Dee: Red
- Nicole: Brown

- Shear Genius Winner: Dee
- Runners-Up: Charlie (First Runner-Up); Nicole (Second Runner-Up)

Judges: Jaclyn Smith, Kim Vo, Linda Wells, Sally Hershberger

== Additional Facts ==
During the commercial breaks of the finale, Daniel was declared Fan Favorite and the audience voted for Nicole to win.
