= Neslen =

Neslen is a surname. Notable people with the surname include:

- Arthur Neslen, British journalist and author
- Charles Clarence Neslen (1879–1967), American politician
- Florence Frandsen Neslen (1908–2000), American educator and painter
- Janet Warren Neslen (1924–after 2015), American public health physician

== See also ==
- Neslen Formation, a geologic formation in Utah
