= Arkansas Razorbacks Swimming and Diving =

The Arkansas Razorbacks swimming and diving program is one of 19 teams at the University of Arkansas. The team is a member of the Southeastern Conference and is currently coached by Sean Schimmel.

== NCAA Finishes ==
Arkansas' highest finish at the NCAA Division I Women's Swimming and Diving Championships was 16th in 1985.

Year	Arkansas Finish (points)
1982	--
1983	T22nd (16)
1984	--
1985	16th (76)
1986	T25th (30)
1987	--
1988	T17th (42)
1989	22nd (38)
1990	25th (30)
1991	27th (18)
1992	39th (5)
1993	32nd (10)
1994	--
1995	T33rd (11)
1996	T36th (2)
1997	--
1998	--
1999	--
2000	--
2001	38th (9)
2002	--
2003	31st (18)
2004	27th (24)
2005	--
2006	--
2007	--
2008	35th (14)
2009	27th (24)
2010	34th (15)
2011	T32nd (12)
2012	41st (7)
2013	26th (24)
2014	--
