= Gender and emotional expression =

Overview of emotional expression by gender

The study of the relationship between gender and emotional expression is the study of the differences between men and women in behavior that expresses emotions. These differences in emotional expression may be primarily due to cultural expectations of femininity and masculinity.

== Major theories ==
Many psychologists reject the notion that men experience emotions less frequently than women do. Instead, researchers have suggested that men exhibit restrictive emotionality. Restrictive emotionality refers to a tendency to inhibit the expression of certain emotions, and an unwillingness to self-disclose intimate feelings. Men's restrictive emotionality has been shown to influence health, emotional appraisal, and overall identity. Furthermore, tendencies toward restrictive emotionality are correlated with an increased risk of certain anxiety disorders.

Research has suggested that women express emotions more frequently than men on average. Multiple researchers have found that women cry more frequently, and for longer durations than men at similar ages. The gender differences appear to peak in the most fertile years. This is possibly due to hormonal differences, as several studies have shown that certain sex hormones influence the way that emotions are expressed.

Other researchers found this gender difference decreases over time. In Handbook of Emotions, Leslie R. Brody and Judith A. Hall report that this difference in emotional expression starts at a young age, as early as 4 and 6 years old, as girls begin to express more sadness and anxiety than their male counterparts. Brody and Hall (2008) report that women generally smile, laugh, nod, and use hand gestures more than men do. The only known exception to this rule is that men more frequently express anger. However, all of these effects are not commonly observed until after preschool, suggesting that these differences might be the result of certain socialization processes. Women are also more accurate at expressing their emotions, when "posing deliberately and when observed unobtrusively." This increased expressiveness in emotional expression and is consistent across cultures, with women reporting more intense emotional experiences and more overt emotional expressions across 37 cultures.

It has been found that men and women each more accurately display gender-stereotypic expressions: men more accurately express anger and contempt, while women more accurately express fear and happiness. Other studies have shown that women show higher levels of expression accuracy and judgement of nonverbal emotional cues than men overall. These patterns are not consistent across cultures, suggesting that socialization influences gender differences in emotional expression. For example, research has suggested that in Japan, women convey anger and contempt better than men do.

== Major empirical findings ==
Some research has shown that culture and context-specific gender roles have a stronger influence on emotional expression than do biological factors. In a 2002 paper, Wester et al. conclude: "In sum, empirical evidence suggests that girls are socialized to be emotional, nonaggressive, nurturing, and obedient, whereas boys are socialized to be unemotional, aggressive, achievement oriented, and self-reliant. Peers continue this process as children develop and mature in effect constraining how, where, why, and with whom certain emotions are expressed." In one cross-cultural study, it was shown that in nearly all cultures, women generally cry more than men; however, the gender difference tends to be more significant in democratic and affluent countries.

Another study suggests that people tend to exhibit more intense negative facial expressions in solitary conditions, and smile more when others are present. In this experiment, men and women did not differ in their anger expression in non-social conditions. However, women were more likely to express their anger in the solitary condition as opposed to the social condition. Men, on the other hand, seemed to be less concerned with appearing positive to others; they showed no difference in their expression of anger based on whether or not others were present.

In another recent study, Coats and Feldman found that women who were more accurate at expressing happiness were judged as more popular, while men who were more accurate at expressing anger were judged as more popular. This suggests that there are negative consequences for people who are less accurate at expressing gender-stereotypical emotions.

These consequences also extend to judging others' emotions. Studies have shown that there are negative social consequences for children who are deficient at judging gender-stereotypic nonverbal cues—angry nonverbal cues for boys, and happy, sad, and fearful nonverbal cues for girls. Communication of emotion involves both detection and expression of emotions or moods. The ability to detect non-verbal cues leads to successful communication of emotions. In computer-mediated communication (CMC), the absence of body language and visibility restricts one's ability to correctly recognize others' emotions. For this reason, emoticons are widely used in online communication to replace non-verbal behaviors that emphasize or clarify one's feelings. Surprisingly, there is no static gender difference in the use of emoticons. In some studies, both men and women display an increase in emoticon use in the context of a mixed-gender group chat. Others show that men use more emoticons when interacting with women, while women show no change when interacting with men.

== Nature versus nurture ==
The social-developmental hypothesis is one of the major arguments for the impact of nurture on emotional expression. The social-developmental theory explains gender differences in emotion expression through emphasizing "children's active role in their development of gendered behavior" through learning by watching adults or through interactions with their parents and peers. This hypothesis points to the fact that infants are not born with the same differences in emotional expression, and gender differences generally grow more pronounced as children age. In a 2012 meta-analysis conducted by Tara M. Chaplin and Amelia Aldao, researchers reviewed gender differences in emotion expression from the infancy period through adolescence in order to determine the impact of development and age on gender differences. Their findings support the notion that social factors in a child's development play a large role in the gender differences that later emerge, as s predicted, gender differences were not found in infancy for positive, externalizing, and general negative emotion expressions (although they were found for internalizing emotion expressions), but they emerged by the toddler/preschool period and in childhood". However, this would not be sufficient to imply there are no innate biological differences. For example, Buck (1984) and others have argued that girls show a potentially biologically-based advantage in language and self-regulation abilities that unfold over time with development. "In addition, we did find a significant effect size for internalizing emotion expressions (with girls greater than boys) in infancy, which may further suggest that gender differences in some emotion expressions may begin quite early and may be either innate or due to very early socialization responses of caregivers." One possible explanation for this developmental difference comes from the child's parents. In many Western cultures, for example, parents discuss and express a broader range of emotions with their daughters than with their sons. As children grow older, these patterns continue with their peers.

A major argument in support of social influences on emotion expression involves the idea that a society's gender roles reinforce gender differences. Social constructionism states that children grow up in the context of gender roles that naturally place them in role-specific situations, influencing their emotion expression in that context. Gender stereotypes in heteronormative societies enforce expectations for women to suppress anger and contempt, but express other emotions using words and facial expressions; and discourage men from verbally expressing emotions, with the exception of anger or contempt. As an adaptive feature, regulation of expression of emotion involves consideration of the social demands of any given situation. Studies have shown that "fewer gender differences in emotion expression may be found when children are with someone they trust and know well than when children are with an unfamiliar person". Generally, people are trained to behave in a "socially acceptable" way around strangers or acquaintances, suggesting that the social context of an environment can shape the levels of emotion expression.

Biological factors also play a role in influencing emotion expression. One central biological argument is related to cognitive differences between genders. In a 2008 study using functional magnetic resonance imaging (fMRI) to monitor brain activity in participants, researchers found that men and women differ in neural responses when experiencing negative emotions. The authors of the study state: "Compared with women, men showed lesser increases in prefrontal regions that are associated with reappraisal, greater decreases in the amygdala, which is associated with emotional responding, and lesser engagement of ventral striatal regions, which are associated with reward processing." The way that male and female brains respond to emotions likely impacts the expression of those emotions.

The biological roots of gender differences interact with the social environment in various ways. Biological theorists propose that females and males have innate differences that exist at birth, but unfold with age and maturation in response to interactions with their specific environments. An important argument for this viewpoint is that "gender differences in emotion expression are the result of a combination of biologically based temperamental predispositions and the socialization of boys and girls to adopt gender-related display rules for emotion expression". It has been suggested that even infant males display higher levels of activity and arousal than do infant girls as well as a lower ability for language and behavior inhibitory controls, which are biologically based characteristics. This "nature" argument interacts with "nurture" in that "parents and other socialization agents may respond to boys in ways that dampen emotional expressiveness…as a way to down-regulate their high emotional arousal and activity levels". On the other hand, girls are encouraged to utilize their communication skills to verbally express their emotions to parents and other adults, which would also highlight expression differences between genders.

== Controversies ==
Emotions are complex and involve different components, such as physiological arousal, expressive behaviors, and conscious experience. While the expressive component of emotion has been widely studied, it remains unclear whether or not men and women differ in other aspects of emotion. Most researchers agree that women are more emotionally expressive, but not that they experience more emotions than men do. Some studies have shown that women are more likely to produce inauthentic smiles than men do, while others have shown the opposite. This debate is significant because emotion can be generated by adopting an action that is associated with a particular emotion, such as smiling and speaking softly.

A possible explanation is that both men and women's emotional expressiveness is susceptible to social factors. Men and women may be reinforced by social and cultural standards to express emotions differently, but it is not necessarily true in terms of experiencing emotions. For instance, studies suggest that women often occupy roles that conform to feminine display rules, which require them to amplify their emotional response to impress others.

== See also ==
- Display rules
- Gender polarization
- Sex differences in emotional intelligence
