= Shear Genius season 3 =

Shear Genius
- Season 3
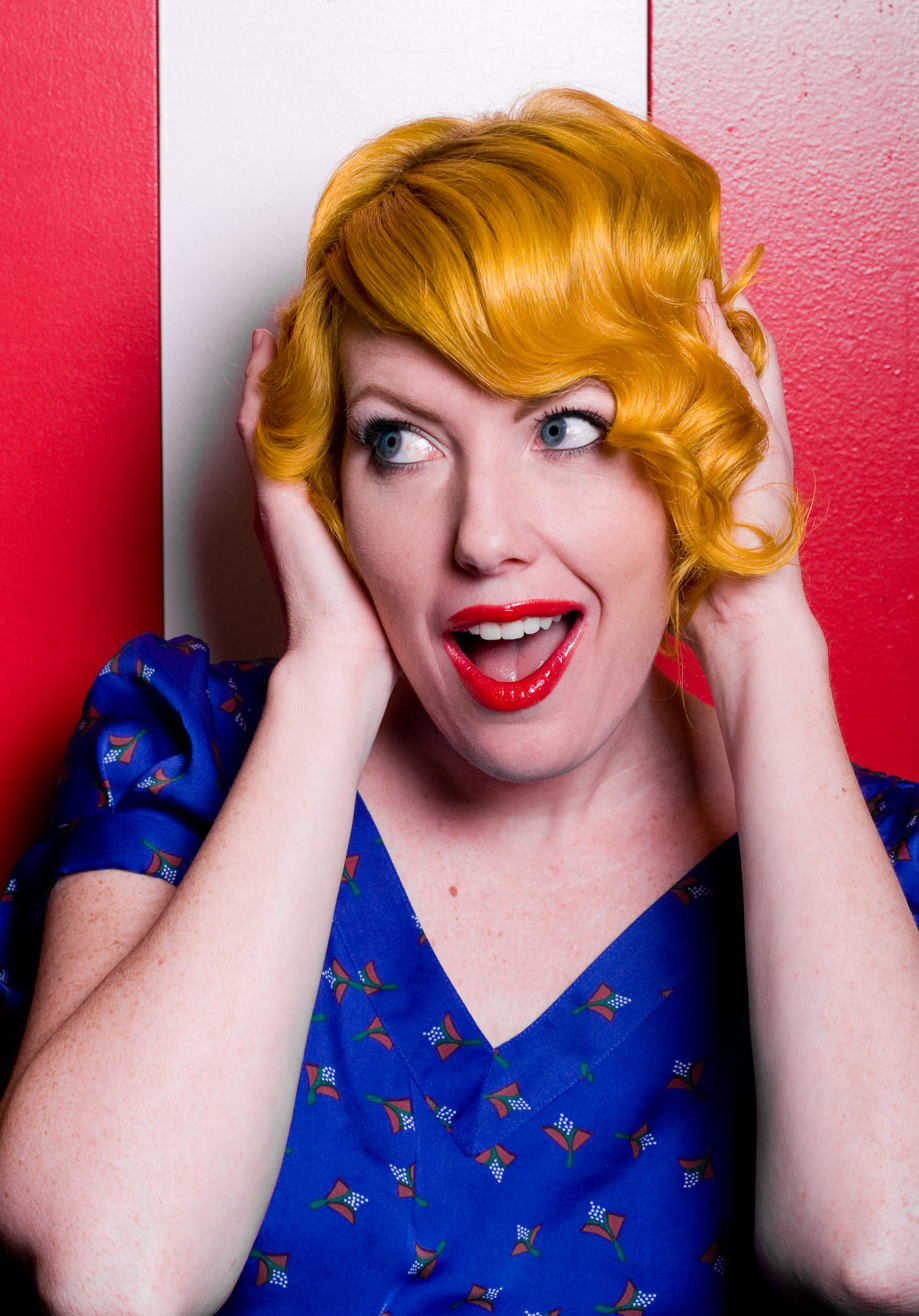
- Shear Genius 3 winner Brig Van Osten
- No. of tasks: 19
- No. of contestants: 12
- Winner: Brig Van Osten
- No. of episodes: 10

Release
- Original release: February 3 – April 7, 2010

Season chronology
- ← Previous; Season 2

Shear Genius 3 is the third season of Bravo's Shear Genius. This season is hosted by Camila Alves, who took over hosting duties from Jaclyn Smith.

== Contestants ==
Contestant	Age	Hometown
Giacomo Forbes	43	Austin, TX
Matthew Morris	38	Denver, CO
April Barton	42	New York, NY
Adee Phelan	36	London, England
Jon Steinick	38	Nashville, TN
Faatemah Ampey	36	Minneapolis, MN
Brig Van Osten	33	Simi Valley, CA
Brian Buterbaugh	37	New York, NY
Amy Michleb	25	Toronto, Canada
Janine Jarman	28	Los Angeles, CA
Arzo Nazamy	35	San Francisco, CA
Joey Scandizzo	29	Melbourne, Australia

== Episode progress ==
Elimination Challenges
Shortcut; Winner	Amy	Matthew	Matthew	Brian	Janine	Janine	Janine	Jon	Matthew	None	
Stylists	1	2	3	4	5	6	7	8	9	10	Episode
Brig	HIGH	LOW	HIGH	LOW	WIN	IN	LOW	LOW	WIN	WINNER	Shear Genius
Janine	WIN	IN	HIGH	HIGH	LOW	HIGH	WIN	HIGH	LOW	CUT	Cut: Finale Runner-Up
Matthew	IN	HIGH	WIN	IN	HIGH	WIN	IN	WIN	HIGH	CUT	Cut: Finale 2nd-Runner Up
Jon	IN	WIN	IN	HIGH	IN	IN	HIGH	LOW	CUT		Cut: Bring It On, Bitches
Brian	IN	HIGH	IN	WIN	IN	LOW	CUT				Cut: Hotter Than a Gay Bar on Fire
April	HIGH	IN	IN	IN	LOW	CUT					Cut: It's All Fun and Games Until Someone Gets Annoying
Amy	LOW	LOW	IN	LOW	CUT						Cut: For The First Time I'm Scared To Death
Adee	LOW	IN	LOW	CUT							Cut: I'm Borderline Pissed Off About That Hair
Faatemah	IN	IN	CUT								Cut: The Spiral of My Emotion
Arzo	IN	CUT									Cut: I'm Totally Stealing Your Model
Giacomo	IN	QUIT									Quit: I'm Totally Stealing Your Model
Joey	CUT										Cut: A Risque Runway

(WINNER) The stylist won the series and was crowned Shear Genius.
(WIN) The stylist won that episode's Elimination Challenge.
(HIGH) The stylist was selected as one of the top entries in the Elimination Challenge, but did not win.
(LOW) The stylist was selected as one of the bottom entries in the Elimination Challenge, but was not eliminated.
(LOW) The stylist was in the bottom two for the Elimination Challenge.
(CUT) The stylist lost this week's Elimination Challenge and was out of the competition.
(IN) The stylist neither won nor lost that week's Elimination Challenge.

== Episodes ==
=== Episode 1: A Risque Runway ===
First Aired: February 3, 2010

Short Cut Challenge: Give clients with punk rock hairstyles a new and sophisticated look

- Best 3: Amy, Arzo, Giacomo
- Worst 3: Brian, Faatemah, Janine
- WINNER: Amy

Elimination Challenge: Design a hairstyle that covers a models bare breasts for a swimsuit runway show

- WINNER: Janine
- CUT: Joey

Judges: Camila Alves, Kim Vo, Jonathan Antin, Monica Wise

=== Episode 2: I'm Totally Stealing Your Model ===
First Aired: February 10, 2010

Short Cut Challenge: To bring a client's stained "dead" hair back to life via color.

- Best 3: Janine, Jon, Matthew
- Worst 3: Adee, April, Brian
- WINNER: Matthew

Elimination Challenge: The contestants had to make a hairstyle inspired by an entrée.

- Stylists & Entrées:

- Adee- Steak Tartare
- Amy-Dakota Burger
- April-Heirloom Tomato Salad
- Arzo-Tuna Tataki
- Brian-Chocolate Mousse
- Brig-Tiramisu
- Faatemah-Orange Flan Trio
- Janine-Beet Salad
- Jon-Seared Scallops
- Matthew-Yellowtail Hamachi

- WINNER: Jon
- CUT: Arzo
- Withdrew: Giacomo

Judges: Camila Alves, Kim Vo, Jonathan Antin

=== Episode 3: The Spiral of My Emotion ===
First Aired: February 17, 2010

Short Cut Challenge: Design a hairstyle for men using extensions.

- Best 2: Janine, Matthew
- Worst 2: Amy, Faatemah

- WINNER: Matthew

Elimination Challenge: The contestants had to make a hairstyle for a romance novel cover. They worked in teams of two with one stylist forced to work solo.

- Teams:

- Adee & Faatemah
- Amy & Brian
- April & Jon
- Brig
- Janine & Matthew

- WINNER: Matthew
- CUT: Faatemah

Judges: Camila Alves, Kim Vo, Jonathan Antin, Ken Paves

=== Episode 4: I'm Borderline Pissed Off About That Hair ===
First Aired: February 24, 2010

Short Cut Challenge: Design a hairstyle featuring a variety of flowers.

- Best 2: April, Brian
- Worst 2: Adee, Jon

- WINNER: Brian

Elimination Challenge: Style the hair of 8 bridesmaids for an Indian wedding.

- WINNER: Brian
- CUT: Adee

Judges: Camila Alves, Kim Vo, Jonathan Antin, Tabatha Coffey

=== Episode 5: For The First Time I'm Scared To Death ===
First Aired: March 3, 2010

Short Cut Challenge: Use dry hair cutting technique on curly hair.

- Best 2: Janine, Matthew
- Worst 2: April, Brig

- WINNER: Janine

Elimination Challenge: Design 1940's hairstyles using pin curls and finger waves.

- WINNER: Brig
- CUT: Amy

Judges: Camila Alves, Kim Vo, Jonathan Antin, Robert Vetica

=== Episode 6: It's All Fun and Games Until Someone Gets Annoying ===
First Aired: March 10, 2010

Short Cut Challenge: Interpret geometric shapes into angular hairstyles on Asian clients.

- Best: Janine
- Worst 2: Matthew, April

- WINNER: Janine

Elimination Challenge: Create two different headshot looks on working actresses.

- WINNER: Matthew
- CUT: April

Judges: Camila Alves, Kim Vo, Jonathan Antin, Kevin Mancuso

=== Episode 7: Hotter Than a Gay Bar on Fire ===
First Aired: March 17, 2010

Short Cut Challenge: Style African American hair from high school style to a sophisticated look.

- Best 2: Brian, Janine
- Worst: Brig

- WINNER: Janine

Elimination Challenge: Style hair for a runway hosted by Estelle.

- WINNER: Janine
- CUT: Brian

Judges: Camila Alves, Kim Vo, Jonathan Antin, Estelle

=== Episode 8: The Higher the Hair, the Closer to God ===
First Aired: March 24, 2010

Short Cut Challenge: Competitors choose tools, styles and inspiration for each other.

- Best: Jon
- Worst: Brig

- WINNER: Jon

Elimination Challenge: Make a classic, modern, Hollywood look.

- WINNER: Matthew
- CUT: None^{[a]}

Judges: Camila Alves, Kim Vo, Jonathan Antin, Linda Wells

^[a] Brig and Jon were bottom two, and each dictated the reasons why each should stay. It was then revealed that no one would be eliminated.

=== Episode 9: Bring It On, Bitches ===
First Aired: March 31, 2010

Short Cut Challenge: Style their first celebrity client.

- WINNER: Matthew

Elimination Challenge: Develop two different looks for two different models.

- WINNER: Brig
- CUT: Jon

Judges: Camila Alves, Kim Vo, Jonathan Antin, Oribe

=== Episode 10: Who Will Prove to Be Shear Genius? ===
First Aired: April 7, 2010

Final Challenge: Each of the final three contestants must style six models for a fashion show.

- Shear Genius Winner: Brig
- Runners-Up: Janine Jarman (First Runner-Up); Matthew (Second Runner-Up)

Judges: Camila Alves, Kim Vo, Jonathan Antin, Linda Wells
