= Ridgewood High School (New Jersey) =

High school in Bergen County

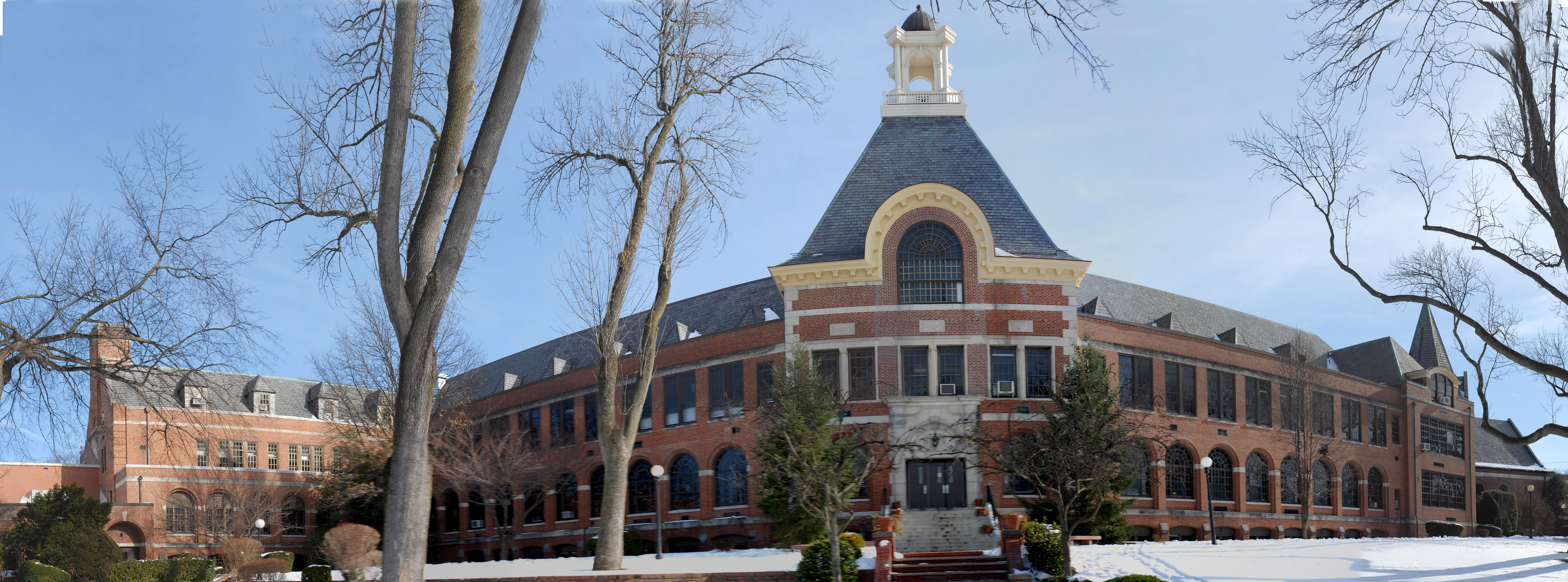

Location
- 627 East Ridgewood Avenue; Ridgewood, Bergen County, New Jersey 07451; United States; 40.976967°N 74.106155°W

Information
- Type: Public high school
- Motto: A Tradition of Excellence
- Established: 1892
- School district: Ridgewood Public Schools
- NCES School ID: 341383000764
- Principal: Jeffrey M. Nyhuis
- Faculty: 135.8 FTEs
- Grades: 9–12
- Enrollment: 1,740 (as of 2024–25)
- Student to teacher ratio: 12.8:1
- Colors: Maroon; White; Black
- Athletics conference: Big North Conference (general); North Jersey Super Football Conference (football)
- Team name: Maroons
- Newspaper: High Times
- Website: School website

Ridgewood High School is a four-year comprehensive public high school in Ridgewood, in Bergen County, in the U.S. state of New Jersey, serving students in ninth through twelfth grades as the lone secondary school of the Ridgewood Public Schools.

As of the 2024–25 school year, the school had an enrollment of 1,740 students and 135.8 classroom teachers (on an FTE basis), for a student–teacher ratio of 12.8:1. There were 39 students (2.2% of enrollment) eligible for free lunch and 16 (0.9% of students) eligible for reduced-cost lunch.

== History ==
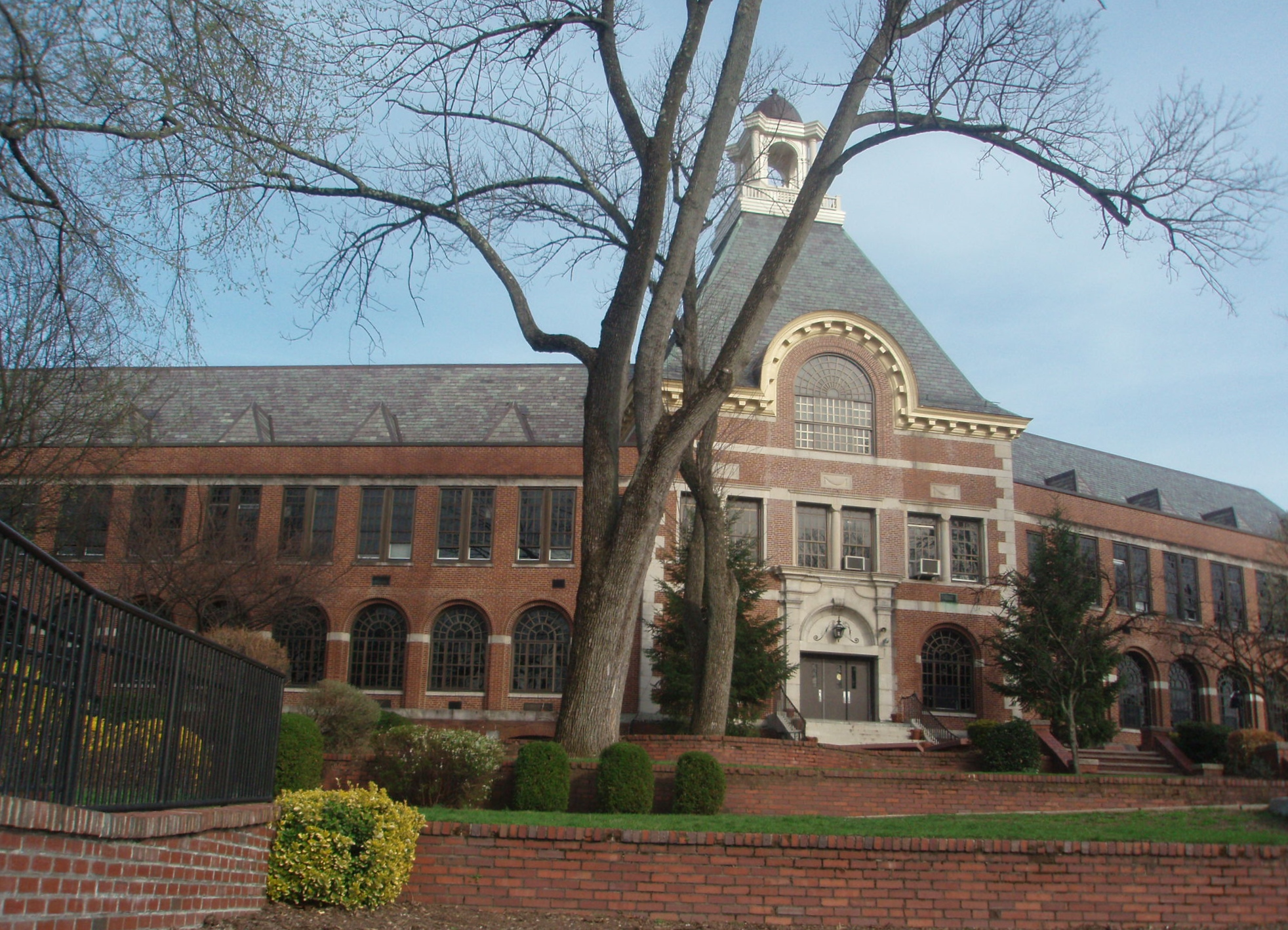
Ridgewood High School entrance

Ridgewood High School was created in 1892, with the creation of a formal ninth grade class. A sophomore class was added the following year. A high school building was established in 1895, and the school received formal recognition from the state as an approved high school.

The campus includes one central building, which, along with the original gym, was completed in 1919 at a total cost of $285,000 (equivalent to $5.3 million in 2025). The building features brick walls, a slate roof and other stone features. The building was planned to be opened at an earlier date but it was postponed because of World War I. The building was designed by the architectural firm of Tracy and Swartwout, which also designed the Missouri State Capitol building.

Students from Glen Rock had attended the high school for grades 10–12 from the time the borough was created. The Glen Rock district was informed in March 1952 by Ridgewood that its students could not be accommodated any longer in Ridgewood after the 1954–55 school year. Glen Rock High School opened in September 1956 with only tenth graders, as those in eleventh and twelfth grades completed their education through graduation at Ridgewood High School.

The newest part of the school, the science wing, was completed in 2001 and contains 15 laboratory classrooms, three computer labs and a new industrial arts center. A new fitness center, gymnasium, and multipurpose room, the Campus Center, were also included in the renovation. Due to their proximity to the Ho-Ho-Kus Brook, the school's fields often flood during heavy rains and spring runoff.

== Awards, recognition and rankings ==
During the 1986–87 school year, Ridgewood High School was recognized with the National Blue Ribbon School Award of Excellence by the United States Department of Education, the highest award an American school can receive.

The school was the 28th-ranked public high school in New Jersey out of 339 schools statewide in New Jersey Monthly magazine's September 2014 cover story on the state's "Top Public High Schools", using a new ranking methodology. The school had been ranked 28th in the state of 328 schools in 2012, after being ranked 20th in 2010 out of 322 schools listed. The magazine ranked the school 7th in 2008 out of 316 schools. The school was ranked 24th in the magazine's September 2006 issue, which included 316 schools across the state.

Schooldigger.com ranked the school tied for 40th out of 381 public high schools statewide in its 2011 rankings (an increase of 8 positions from the 2010 ranking), which were based on the combined percentage of students classified as proficient or above proficient on the mathematics (94.6%) and language arts literacy (96.5%) components of the High School Proficiency Assessment (HSPA).

In the 2011 "Ranking America's High Schools" issue by The Washington Post, the school was ranked 27th in New Jersey and 917th nationwide. In Newsweek's May 22, 2007, issue, ranking the country's top high schools, Ridgewood High School was listed in 549th place, the tenth-highest ranked school in New Jersey. The school was ranked 472 in Newsweek's May 8, 2006, issue, listing the Top 1,200 High Schools in The United States, and was ranked 323 in Newsweek's 2005 survey.

In its 2013 report on "America's Best High Schools," The Daily Beast ranked the school 363rd in the nation among participating public high schools and 32nd among schools in New Jersey. The school was ranked 273rd in the nation and 25th in New Jersey on the list of "America's Best High Schools 2012" prepared by The Daily Beast / Newsweek, with rankings based primarily on graduation rate, matriculation rate for college and number of Advanced Placement / International Baccalaureate courses taken per student, with lesser factors based on average scores on the SAT / ACT, average AP/IB scores and the number of AP/IB courses available to students.

In Spring 2013, Medha Kirtane, a Social Studies teacher at RHS, was honored as an "exceptional" secondary school teacher by Princeton University. An alumnus of Williams College and Harvard Graduate School, Kirtane was recognized along with three other teachers from across the state.

== Academic team ==
Ridgewood High School has had success with its academic teams. Recent successes have included victories in 2013 and 2014 at various local tournaments. Ridgewood's JV History Bowl team won the Northern New Jersey History Bowl in January 2013 and later finished as a quarterfinalist at the 2013 National History Bowl National Championships. In 2015, Ridgewood's Varsity History Bowl finished tied for ninth place at the National Championships. Ridgewood High School was also the site of the 2010 Tri-State History Bowl, a history quiz tournament which served as the pilot competition for what became the National History Bee and Bowl.

== Athletics ==
The Ridgewood High School Maroons compete in the Big North Conference, which is composed of public and private high schools in Bergen and Passaic counties, and was established following a reorganization of sports leagues in Northern New Jersey by the New Jersey State Interscholastic Athletic Association. For the 2009-10 school year, Ridgewood was part of the North Jersey Tri-County Conference, a conference established on an interim basis to facilitate the realignment. Until the NJSIAA's 2009 realignment, the school had participated in Division A of the Northern New Jersey Interscholastic League, which included high schools located in Bergen, Essex and Passaic counties, and was separated into three divisions based on NJSIAA size classification. With 1,414 students in grades 10–12, the school was classified by the NJSIAA for the 2019–20 school year as Group IV for most athletic competition purposes, which included schools with an enrollment of 1,060 to 5,049 students in that grade range. The football team competes in the Freedom Red division of the North Jersey Super Football Conference, which includes 112 schools competing in 20 divisions, making it the nation's biggest football-only high school sports league. The school was classified by the NJSIAA as Group V North for football for 2024–2026, which included schools with 1,317 to 5,409 students. The school's sports teams are nicknamed the Maroons. Ridgewood High School athletics are broadcast locally on RHS-TV Sports, a student-produced sports television network, every Tuesday night at 8 pm throughout the school year.

The boys track team won the Group III spring / outdoor track state championship in 1939.

The boys' tennis team won the overall state championship in 1952 (vs. Montclair High School), 1954–1956 (vs. William L. Dickinson High School all three years), 1958 (vs. Princeton High School) and 1966 (vs. Westfield High School), and won the Group IV state championship in 1968 (vs. Teaneck High School); the six overall state titles, all won in the era before the Tournament of Champions format began in 1992, are tied for the fourth-most of any school in the state. The 1952 team defeated Summit High School in the semifinals and moved on to beat Montclair 3-0 in the finals to win the overall state tennis title and finish the season undefeated. In 2007, the boys' tennis team won their second state sectionals title in three years, defeating Livingston High School 3–2 to win the North I, Group IV championship. The 2008 boys' tennis Team won their third consecutive North I, Group IV state sectional championship with a 4–1 win in the tournament final over Livingston High School. In 2009, the Maroons defeated Bergen Tech 4–1 at Paramus High School for their fourth consecutive North I Group IV state sectional championship.

The boys' soccer team won the Group III title in 1953 (as co-champion with Hamilton High School), and won the Group IV state title in 1956 (as co-champion with Kearny High School) and 1957 (awarded by NJSIAA).

The football team was awarded the sectional championship by the New Jersey State Interscholastic Athletic Association in 1960 (as co-champion). Since the playoff system was introduced in 1974, the team has won the North I Group IV state sectional championships in 1991, 2003 and 2004, and won the North I Group V state sectional title in 2016, 2018 and 2019. The 1991 team, under coach Chuck Johnson, finished the season with an 8–3 record after defeating North Bergen High School by a score of 26–15 in the tournament final to win the North I Group IV state championship, the first ever for the Maroons in the playoff era. In 2003, the football team defeated Morristown High School by a score of 35–6 in the NJSIAA North I Group IV title game at Giants Stadium. In 2004, the football team repeated the feat by defeating Hackensack High School 27-20, again at Giants Stadium. The team defeated Passaic County Technical Institute in 2016 to win the North I, Group V state sectional championship by a score of 14–13, finishing the season undefeated for the first time since 1957, with a 12–0 record. In 2018, the team won their second North II Group V title with a 27–7 win against Montclair High School in the sectional finals. The team repeated as the North I Group V state sectional championship in 2019 and then went on to defeat previously undefeated North II champion Union High School by a score of 41–37 to win the Group V North regional championship game.

The girls tennis team won the Group IV state championship in 1977 (against Cherry Hill High School East in the final match of the tournament) and 1980 (vs. Cherry Hill East).

The softball team won the Group IV state title in 1979 (defeating Woodbridge High School in the tournament final) and 1983 (vs. Cherry Hill High School West). The 1983 team finished the season with a 29–0 record after winning the Group IV title with a 7–0 victory against Cherry Hill West in the championship game. NJ.com / The Star-Ledger ranked Ridgewood as their number-one softball team in the state in 1983. The team, coached by Patricia Auger, won the 2005 Bergen County Championship and 2006 North I Group IV state sectional championship, defeating Bloomfield High School by 3–0.

The girls' cross country team won the Group IV state championship in 1980, 1992, 1998 and 1999. Team members won individual Group IV championships in 1984, 1993, 1997 and 2001.

The girls volleyball team won the Group IV state championship in 1986 (against runner-up Paramus High School in the final match of the playoffs), 1987 (vs. Paramus Catholic High School) and 1996 (vs. Immaculate Heart Academy). The 1986 team finished the season with a 23–1 record after winning the Group IV title in three games (13–15, 15–12 and 15–8) against a Paramus team that had come into the finals undefeated and was four points away from winning in the second game.

The girls' track team won the Group IV indoor relay state championship in 1987, 1988 and 1989.

The girls track team won the winter / indoor track Group IV state championship in 1988, 1989, 2016, 2019 and 2022. The program's five state group titles are tied for seventh-most in the state.

The girls' outdoor track and field team won the Group IV state championship in 1988 and 1989.

The boys' lacrosse team won state championships in 1990 (defeating Arthur L. Johnson High School in the final game of the state tournament) and 1991 (vs. Montclair High School), along with Group III championships in 2004 (vs. Westfield High School), 2006 (vs. Randolph High School), 2008 (vs. Montgomery High School), 2009 (vs. Shawnee High School), 2012 (vs. Morristown High School), 2013 (vs. Shawnee), 2014 (vs. Moorestown High School) and 2015 (vs. Shawnee). The program's 10 state group titles are tied for fourth-most statewide. The 1991 team finished the season 19–0 and brought their streak to 34 consecutive wins after taking their second straight state title with a 10–8 win against Montclair in the championship game. The 2009 team won the Group III title in 2009 with an 11-6 win against Shawnee in the finals. In 2011, Ridgewood High School won the Gibbs League and won the Bergen County Tournament Championship vs. Don Bosco Preparatory High School. Ridgewood High School has made it to the final four of the Tournament of Champions (which includes all six state group champions) both in 2012 when they lost to Bridgewater-Raritan High School in triple overtime (Ranked top 20 in the country by InsideLacrosse magazine in 2012) and in 2013 to Don Bosco Prep High School (Ranked 25th in the country by InsideLacrosse magazine in 2013). In 2023, Ridgewood won the overall New Jersey State Championship by winning the Kirst Cup, which replaced the Tournament of Champions. It was the first time in over 30 years that the Ridgewood boys lacrosse team won the overall state title. They finished the year as the #1 ranked team in New Jersey, as decided by NJ.com.

The Ridgewood boys' cross country team has won Group IV state championships in 1991 and 1992. The team, headed by Coach Mike Glynn since the 1970s (with the exception of a two-year break), has won multiple titles at the Bergen County Meet of Champions since the 1990s, earning Glynn recognition from The Record in 2010 as its Coach of the Decade. Notable runners in previous years include Joe Lemay, who went on to represent the United States at the World Half Marathon Championships and the World Cross-Country Championships, and Bob Keino (son of Kenyan Olympian Kip Keino), who won the New Jersey State Meet of Champions in both 1992 and 1993. Taro Shigenobu qualified for the Nike Cross Nationals in 2008, and was recognized by The Record as its runner of the year in 2009 and as part of its All-Decade team in 2010, joining Michael Cator, Byron Williams and Ari Zamir on its list of top Bergen County runners. In 2017, the Ridgewood Boys won their first Bergen Meet of Champions title since 2005 under coach Patrick Ryan, defeating Northern Valley Regional High School at Demarest, 88–94.

The girls' basketball team won the Group IV state championship in 1991 with a win against Piscataway High School in the final game of the tournament.

The ice hockey team won the Handchen Cup in 1999 and the McMullen Cup in 2006.

In 2007, the girls' indoor track and field were North I, Group IV state sectional champions, edging out East Orange Campus High School. That year, the team came in 2nd nationally for the Shuttle Hurdle Relay; Although not running as fast as they did in 2007, the team came 1st in 2008 for the Shuttle Hurdles at the National Scholastic Indoor Championships. In 2008, the boys' outdoor track and field team placed 6th nationally in the Sprint Medley Relay, the first sprint team to place at Nationals for RHS after numerous previous Top 6 finishes in the Distance Medley Relay.

The girls' lacrosse team won the Group IV state championship in 2010 (defeating Cherokee High School in the tournament final), 2011 (vs. Washington Township High School), 2012 (vs. Clearview Regional High School), 2015 (vs. Lenape High School), 2016 (vs. Shawnee High School), 2018 (vs. Clearview) and 2019 (vs. Eastern Regional High School); the program's seven state group titles are tied for fourth in the state. The team won the Tournament of Champions in 2010 vs. West Morris Mendham High School and 2011 (vs. Moorestown High School). In 2010, the team won the Tournament of Champions with a 7–6 win against West Morris Mendham in its first appearance in the tournament. They won again in 2011 with a 10–9 comeback victory against rival Moorestown.

Girls' soccer coach Jeff Yearing, in his 25th year of coaching, won his 400th career game in September 2011, placing him second among all active Bergen County coaches.

The Ridgewood boys' track and field teams have also experienced notable success. In the 2013 spring season, the Maroons boys won the Bergen County Relays championship, Big North league championship, the Bergen County Team championship, (over perennial powerhouse Don Bosco Preparatory High School), and their fourth consecutive North I Group IV state sectional championship. The sectional championship qualified RHS for New Jersey's first ever group team championship in Egg Harbor Township, where the Maroons finished second. At the New Balance Nationals, the team set a new school and county record in the 4x800 meter relay, finishing fifth in the nation with a time of 7:39.57. The team's coaches are Josh Saladino and Mike Glynn.

In 2017, the girls' varsity ski team won the state championship. Individually, ski racers from Ridgewood won the Overall Women's state championship and the Giant Slalom Men's state championship. In 2019 the girls' varsity ski team won the Liberty Championship, Giant Slalom State Championship, Slalom State Championship, and Overall State Championship. They finished the season undefeated, 20–0. Kaitlyn Devir won the Overall State Championship and Jane McKinley placed 3rd. In 2020 Ridgewood girls won their third Overall State Championship in four years. The boys team won the State Slalom Championship for the first time in program history. Jane McKinley, Eddie O'Keefe and Cole Sherman were named to the All-State Team

The baseball team won the Group IV state championship in 2019 (vs. Eastern Regional High School) and 2024 (vs. Old Bridge High School). In 2019, the team won their first ever state title, defeating Eastern Regional by a score of 2–1 in the group final. That same season, the team won their first championship in the 61-year history of the Bergen County Tournament, defeating Saint Joseph Regional High School by a score of 10–7 in the tournament final.

== Music ==
Ridgewood High School's music department offers three orchestras, four choirs, three concert bands, a marching band, two jazz ensembles, and numerous small ensembles. Ridgewood High School was named a Grammy Signature School in 2004.

The three curricular bands are the symphonic band, concert band, and wind ensemble, conducted by John W. Luckenbill III and Jeffery G. Haas. The symphonic band is an entry-level band where students focus on sharpening their skills in rhythm, pitch, and balance. The use of method books and exercises is supplemented by appropriate concert selections (Level 2.5 to 3), and these skills are developed in an enjoyable environment.

== Administration ==
The school's principal is Jeffrey M. Nyhuis. His core administration team includes two assistant principals.

== Demographics ==
As of the 2020–21 school year Ridgewood High was 66% White, 18% Asian, 10% Hispanic, 1% Black, 0.1% Hawaiian Native/Pacific Islander, and 0% American Indian/Alaskan Native.

RHS's feeder schools are Benjamin Franklin Middle School and George Washington Middle School.

== Notable alumni ==
- Robert T. Bakker (born 1945, class of 1963), paleontologist
- Guy Benson (born 1985, class of 2003), conservative talk radio personality; Fox News contributor
- Alex Bleeker (born 1986, class of 2004), musician and guitarist best known as the bassist of the American indie rock band Real Estate
- Andy Blitz (born 1971, class of 1989), comedian, writer, producer and actor best known for his sketch comedy and writing work on the late-night talk show Late Night with Conan O'Brien
- Tara M. Chaplin, psychologist
- Tyler Clementi (1991–2010, class of 2010), Rutgers University student who committed suicide after his intimate encounter with another man was streamed online
- Carin Cone (1940–2025, class of 1958), former competition swimmer and 1956 Olympic silver medalist in the 100-meter backstroke
- Kelly Conheeney (born 1991, class of 2009), soccer player; midfielder for Sky Blue FC in the NWSL
- Doug Cook (born 1948, class of 1966), former professional basketball player
- Martin Courtney (born 1985, class of 2004), founder of indie rock band Real Estate
- Andy Daly (born 1971, class of 1989), actor, comedian, and writer
- David Duffield (born 1940, class of 1958), co-founder of PeopleSoft and Workday, Inc.
- Gerry Duggan (born 1974, class of 1992), television writer and comic book author
- Richard S. Forrest (1932–2005, class of 1950), mystery and suspense novelist and short story author
- Willie Geist (born 1975, class of 1993), co-host of MSNBC's Morning Joe
- Elizabeth Hawes (1903–1971, class of 1922), clothing designer, outspoken critic of the fashion industry and champion of ready-to-wear
- Sonny Igoe (1923–2012, class of 1939), jazz drummer
- Walter M. D. Kern (1937–1998, class of 1955), politician who represented the 40th Legislative District in the New Jersey General Assembly from 1978 to 1990
- Younghoe Koo (born 1994, class of 2013), South Korean-born NFL placekicker for the New York Giants
- Liz Krueger (born 1957, class of 1975), member of the New York State Senate, representing District 28 on the East Side of Manhattan
- L.A. Beast (born 1984 as Kevin Strahle, class of 2002), competitive eater
- Robert Sean Leonard (born 1969, class of 1987), actor who started acting while at the school and was given work study credit for his theatrical work
- Barbara Love (1937–2022), feminist writer and the editor of Feminists who Changed America, 1963–1975
- Alfred Lutter (born 1962, class of 1980) entrepreneur, engineer, consultant, and former child actor, best known for his appearance in Alice Doesn't Live Here Anymore
- David Madden (born 1981, class of 1999), 19-day champion on Jeopardy!; founder and executive director of the National History Bee and Bowl
- Andrew Maguire (born 1939, class of 1957), politician who represented New Jersey's 7th congressional district from 1975 to 1981
- Julia Meade (1925–2016, class of 1944), film and stage actress who was a frequent pitch person in live commercials in the early days of television in the 1950s
- Michael Mercurio (born 1982, class of 2000), actor who has appeared in film, theatre, and television, often portraying psychologically disturbed characters
- Matt Mondanile (born 1985, class of 2004), guitarist, singer and songwriter best known as the former lead guitarist of the American indie rock band Real Estate
- Richard Muenz (born 1948, class of 1966), actor
- Helen Nearing (1904–1995, class of 1922), author and advocate of simple living
- Janet Warren Neslen (1924–?, class of 1942), public health physician
- Kim Ng (born 1968, class of 1987), Major League Baseball executive
- James "Buddy" Nielsen (born 1984, class of 2002), musician, Senses Fail
- Patti O'Reilly (born 1968, class of 1986), former professional tennis player
- Cassie Ramone (born 1986, class of 2004), musician and artist who rose to prominence as the guitarist and vocalist of indie rock band Vivian Girls
- Kenneth Rapuano (class of 1980), Marine who has held various global security-related posts within the U.S. federal government
- Nelson Riddle (1921–1985, class of 1939), bandleader, arranger and orchestrator
- Beatrice Schroeder Rose (1922–2014, class of 1942), author, composer, harpist and teacher, who was the principal harpist of the Houston Symphony for 31 years
- Thomas M. Ryan Jr. (1928–2024, class of 1946), United States Air Force four-star general
- Mitchell Saron (born 2000, class of 2019), sabre fencer, who will represent the United States at the 2024 Summer Olympics in Paris
- Sean Schimmel (born 1969, class of 1987), swimming coach who competed for the University of Southern California
- David Schenker (born 1968, class of 1986), diplomat who has served as Assistant Secretary of State for Near Eastern Affairs
- Thelma Schoonmaker (born 1940, class of 1957), Academy Award winning film editor, who edited more than 25 works by director Martin Scorsese
- Michael Springer (born 1979), lacrosse player and coach who played for the Philadelphia Barrage of Major League Lacrosse
- Todd Stitzer (born 1952, class of 1970), businessman who served as the chief executive officer of Cadbury plc from 2003 to 2010
- Ali Stroker (born 1987, class of 2005), Tony Award winning actress and singer, who is the first actress needing a wheelchair for mobility known to have appeared on a Broadway stage
- Kazbek Tambi (born 1961, class of 1979), current Seton Hall University women's soccer head coach and former professional soccer player; inducted into the RHS Athletic Hall of Fame in 2004
- J. Parnell Thomas (1895–1970, class of 1914), stockbroker and politician who was elected to seven terms as a U.S. Representative, serving from 1937 to 1950
- Donald L. Totten (1933–2019, class of 1951), mechanical engineer and politician who served in the Illinois House of Representatives from 1973 to 1981 and in the Illinois Senate from 1981 to 1983
- David Van Tieghem (born 1955, class of 1973), percussionist, composer and sound designer
- Michael Zegen (born 1979, class of 1997), actor best known for his role as Joel Maisel on The Marvelous Mrs. Maisel
- Jeremy Zoll, general manager of the Minnesota Twins of Major League Baseball

== See also ==
- Global Classroom Conference, hosted by the school in 2016
