= Por Um Fio =

2010 Brazilian reality television series

- Created by: Reveille Productions
- Starring: Juliana Paes
- Judges: Juliana Paes; Ricardo dos Anjos; Wanda Alves
- Country of origin: Brazil
- No. of episodes: 12

Production
- Running time: 30 minutes

Original release
- Network: GNT
- Release: September 24, 2010 – present

Related
- Shear Genius

Por Um Fio is a Brazilian reality television show, which premiered September 24, 2010 with the season finale airing December 10, 2010 on the GNT television cable channel. It is the Brazilian version of Bravo's reality competition for hair stylists, Shear Genius.

The show is presented by actress Juliana Paes, who also serves as head judge. Ricardo dos Anjos and Wanda Alves are also part of the judging panel. Hair stylist Tiago Parente is the contestant's mentor.

There were twelve contestants competing for the grand prize, which was R$50,000 and a beauty editorial in the Brazilian edition of Marie Claire.

Gabriela Gusso was declared the winner, placing Andrew Jackson in second and André Ramos in third.

== Production ==
=== Cast ===
Casting and production started in early 2010. Applications were due by June 2010 until July, 2010. Ultimately, twelve contestants were chosen by the producers to participate the show in August 2010.

=== Guests ===
In mid-August it was announced that Brazilian Marie Claire editor Monica Serino, TV presenter Sabrina Sato and actresses Carolina Ferraz and Sthefany Brito, will be guest judges during the season.

=== Filming ===
Filming started early-August, 2010 in Vila Mariana, São Paulo and run for approximately three weeks.

== Contestants ==
The cast list was unveiled on Friday, August 20, 2010.

(ages stated at time of contest)

Name	Age	Hometown	Finish
Tide Martins	22	São Paulo	12th
Mariana Gorini	31	Rio de Janeiro	11th
Lucas Possetti	25	Birigui	10th
Neiva Pena	28	São Paulo	9th
Leonardo Wichrowski	28	Porto Alegre	8th
Angela Kanno	31	Curitiba	7th
Leandro Pires	30	Cotia	6th
Marcelo Formiga	42	Porto Alegre	5th
Willy Morales	30	Sorocaba	4th
André Ramos	28	Belém do Pará	3rd
Andrew Jackson	34	Fortaleza	Runner-Up
Gabriela Gusso	19	Curitiba	Winner

== Elimination Chart ==
	1	2	3	4	5	6	7	8	9	10	11	12
Gabriela	IN	IN	HIGH	HIGH	HIGH	WIN	LOW	HIGH	WIN	HIGH	LOW	WIN
Andrew	CUT				IN	LOW	WIN	WIN	HIGH	WIN	IN	CUT
André	IN	HIGH	HIGH	IN	IN	HIGH	IN	HIGH	IN	IN	WIN	CUT
Willy	IN	IN	IN	LOW	HIGH	HIGH	HIGH	LOW	IN	LOW	CUT	
Marcelo	WIN	IN	IN	HIGH	IN	LOW	LOW	IN	LOW	CUT		
Leandro	LOW	LOW	CUT		IN	IN	IN	LOW	CUT			
Angela	IN	IN	IN	LOW	WIN	IN	HIGH	CUT				
Leonardo	HIGH	LOW	LOW	IN	IN	IN	CUT					
Neiva	IN	IN	WIN	WIN	IN	CUT						
Lucas	IN	HIGH	IN	IN	CUT							
Mariana	HIGH	WIN	LOW	CUT								
Tide	LOW	CUT										

=== Key ===
The stylist won the competition.
The stylist won elimination challenge.
The stylist was top three of the week.
The stylist was in the bottom three and was saved first.
The stylist was in the bottom three and was saved last.
The stylist was eliminated.

== Episodes Summaries ==
=== Print Personal Style ===
First Air Date: Sep 24, 2010

- WINNER: Marcelo
- CUT: Andrew

Judges: Juliana Paes, Ricardo dos Anjos, Wanda Alves, Wanderley Nunes

=== A New Genus ===
First Air Date: Oct 01, 2010

- WINNER: Mariana
- CUT: Tide

Judges: Juliana Paes, Ricardo dos Anjos, Wanda Alves, Paulo Ricardo

=== Blondes Become Super-Blondes ===
First Air Date: Oct 08, 2010

- WINNER: Neiva
- CUT: Leandro

Judges: Juliana Paes, Ricardo dos Anjos, Wanda Alves, Mariana Weickert

=== Ten Years Younger ===
First Air Date: Oct 15, 2010

- WINNER: Neiva
- CUT: Mariana

Judges: Juliana Paes, Ricardo dos Anjos, Wanda Alves, Regina Martelli

=== Blondes, Brunettes and Redheads ===
First Air Date: Oct 22, 2010

- WINNER: Angela
- CUT: Lucas, Mariana, Tide

Judges: Juliana Paes, Ricardo dos Anjos, Wanda Alves, Luciana Alvarez

=== Shampoo Ad ===
First Air Date: Oct 29, 2010

- WINNER: Gabriela
- CUT: Neiva

Judges: Juliana Paes, Ricardo dos Anjos, Wanda Alves, Daniel Klajmic

=== Makeover ===
First Air Date: Nov 05, 2010

- WINNER: Andrew
- CUT: Leonardo

Judges: Juliana Paes, Ricardo dos Anjos, Wanda Alves, Sthefany Brito

=== Magazine Cover ===
First Air Date: Nov 12, 2010

- WINNER: Andrew
- CUT: Angela

Judges: Juliana Paes, Ricardo dos Anjos, Wanda Alves, Monica Serino

=== Divas ===
First Air Date: Nov 19, 2010

- WINNER: Gabriela
- CUT: Leandro

Judges: Juliana Paes, Ricardo dos Anjos, Wanda Alves, Carolina Ferraz

=== Where Are My Tools? ===
First Air Date: Nov 26, 2010

- WINNER: Andrew
- CUT: Marcelo

Judges: Juliana Paes, Ricardo dos Anjos, Wanda Alves, Wanessa

=== Cartoon ===
First Air Date: Dec 03, 2010

- WINNER: André
- CUT: Willy

Judges: Juliana Paes, Ricardo dos Anjos, Wanda Alves, Sabrina Sato

=== Runway Show ===
First Air Date: Dec 10, 2010

- WINNER: Gabriela
- RUNNERS-UP: Andrew, André

Judges: Juliana Paes, Ricardo dos Anjos, Wanda Alves, Samuel Cirnansck
