= Kids BBQ Championship =

American cooking competition television series

- Genre: Food reality television
- Judges: Eddie Jackson; Camila Alves (2016); Damaris Phillips (2017)
- Country of origin: United States
- Original language: English
- No. of seasons: 2
- No. of episodes: 15

Production
- Producer: Lucky8
- Running time: 41:00

Original release
- Network: Food Network
- Release: May 23, 2016 – June 19, 2017

Kids BBQ Championship is an American cooking reality competition television series that aired on Food Network.

The first season of the series officially premiered on May 23, 2016; and it was presented by chef Eddie Jackson and model Camila Alves, who also served as judges. The season began with eight child chefs in the pilot episode and then ended with three finalists in the season finale, with the winner receiving $20,000. The second season of the series premiered on May 1, 2017, with Alves having been replaced by chef Damaris Phillips. The format of the series had also changed, as there were four different child chefs with a different winner in each episode; and said winner receiving $10,000.

In each episode, the two judges were joined by a rotating lineup of special guest chefs who would serve as the third judge.

== Season 1 ==
=== Episodes ===
No.	Title	Original air date	Production code	Guest judge
1	"Meat the Chefs"	May 23, 2016	TBA	Tim Love
2	"Backyard BBQ"	May 30, 2016	TBA	Kardea Brown
3	"Luau Feast"	June 6, 2016	TBA	Diva Q
4	"State Fair"	June 13, 2016	TBA	Adrian Davila
5	"Cowboy Campfire"	June 20, 2016	TBA	Kent Rollins
6	"The Big Smoke"	June 27, 2016	TBA	Graham Elliot

=== Contestants ===
Name	Age	Where From	Eliminated
Tyler	11	Weston, FL	Winner
Carter	12	Austin, TX	Runner-Up
Paris	11	Johns Creek, GA	Runner-Up
Josie	11	Medford, NJ	Eliminated in Week 5
Ty	13	Seguin, TX	Eliminated in Week 4
Jacob	12	Yazoo City, MS	Eliminated in Week 3
Sydney	10	Euharlee, GA	Eliminated in Week 2
LJ	12	Tampa, FL	Eliminated in Week 1

== Season 2 ==
=== Episodes ===
No.	Title	Original air date	Production code	Contestants			Guest judge
No.	Title	Original air date	Production code	Winner	Runners-up	4th place	Guest judge
1	"Bacon, Ribs and Roasts" (Note: "Bacon, Ribs and Roasts" was produced as the second episode of the second season, but it aired as the first episode of the season.)	May 1, 2017	TBA				Diva Q
2	"Tex Mex Showdown" (Note: "Tex Mex Showdown" was produced as the third episode of the second season, but it aired as the second episode of the season.)	May 8, 2017	TBA				Jess Pryles
3	"Red, White and BBQ" (Note: "Red, White and BBQ" was produced as the first episode of the second season, but it aired as the third episode of the season.)	May 15, 2017	TBA				Shannon Ambrosio
4	"Global Grillers"	May 22, 2017	TBA				Roger Mooking
5	"Chuckwagon Challenge"	May 29, 2017	TBA				Kent Rollins
6	"Game Day Grill Masters" (Note: "Game Day Grill Masters" was produced as the eighth episode of the second season and "Boardwalk Bites" was produced as the sixth episode of the season, but the episodes aired in reverse order.)	June 5, 2017	TBA				Michael Mixon
7	"Father's Day Feast"	June 12, 2017	TBA				Roger Mooking
8	"Boardwalk Bites"	June 19, 2017	TBA				Shannon Ambrosio
