= Camila Alves =

Brazilian-American model and designer (born 1982)

Camila Alves McConaughey
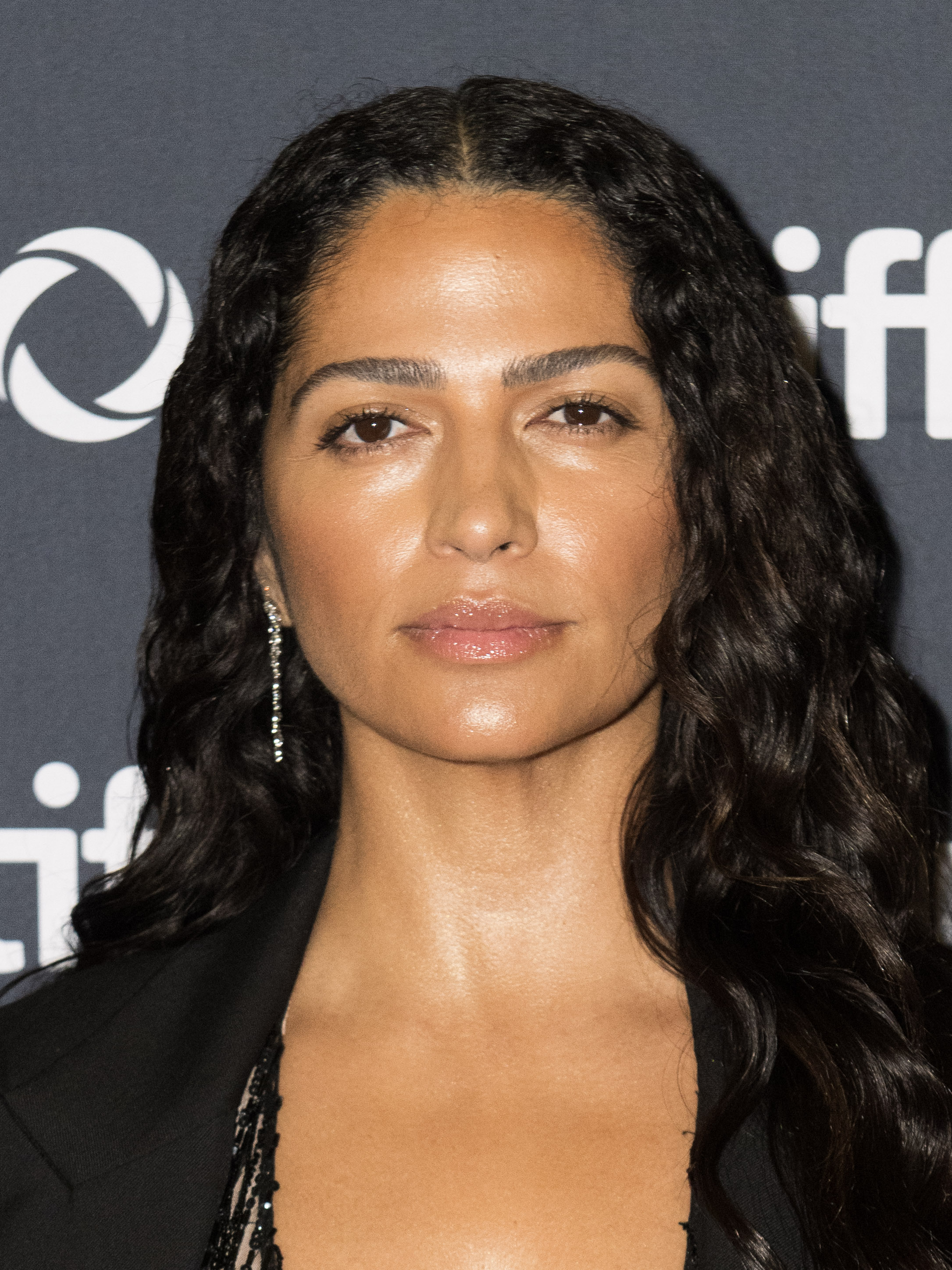
- Alves in 2025
- Born: Camila Alves; 28 January 1983 (age 43); Itambacuri, Minas Gerais, Brazil
- Citizenship: Brazil; United States
- Occupations: Model; designer
- Years active: 2001–present
- Spouse: Matthew McConaughey (m. 2012)
- Children: 3
- Modeling information
- Height: 5 ft 9 in (175 cm)
- Hair color: Black
- Eye color: Brown
- Agency: Uno Models (Barcelona)
- Website: womenoftoday.com

Camila McConaughey (née Alves; born 28 January 1983) is a Brazilian-American model and designer. She is married to American actor Matthew McConaughey.

== Early life ==
Camila Alves was born in Itambacuri, Minas Gerais, Brazil, about 250 miles east of the capital of the state of Minas Gerais, Belo Horizonte, and was raised there until the age of 15. Her mother is an artist and designer, and her father, a ranch owner. At 15, Alves immigrated to Los Angeles. After working for four years as a house-cleaner and waitress there, she became fluent in English and decided to make the United States her home.

== Career ==
At the age of 20, Alves moved to New York City to pursue a career as a fashion model. Alves worked as a waitress and as a cleaner at one point. As a model, she has appeared on the covers of Ocean Drive, the Brazilian edition of Men's Vogue, ES Magazine, Maxim, Town & Country, People and Bella. She has walked the runway at fashion shows for Valentino, Carolina Herrera, Mango, The Heart Truth's Red Dress Collection and TCN.

Alves and her mother designed the Muxo line of handbags. In 2010, Alves hosted the third season of the Bravo network reality television series Shear Genius. In April 2012, Alves was signed on as the new face for Macy's clothing line I.N.C. International Concepts.

In January 2016, Alves launched a lifestyle website, Women of Today, that serves as a hub for her social media; livestream video program, Camila's Code; and blog posts on food, health, crafts & décor, style, family, and work life. Alves is also the co-owner of the organic food company, Yummy Spoonfuls, which launched its product line for babies and toddlers in Target's frozen food section in 2016.

She co-hosted, with Eddie Jackson, the first season of the Food Network competition show Kids BBQ Championship, which aired in summer 2016.

Her children's book, Just Try One Bite, co-written with Adam Mansbach was released in on March 22, 2022 by Dial Books. The book landed on the New York Times Best Seller list.

== Personal life ==
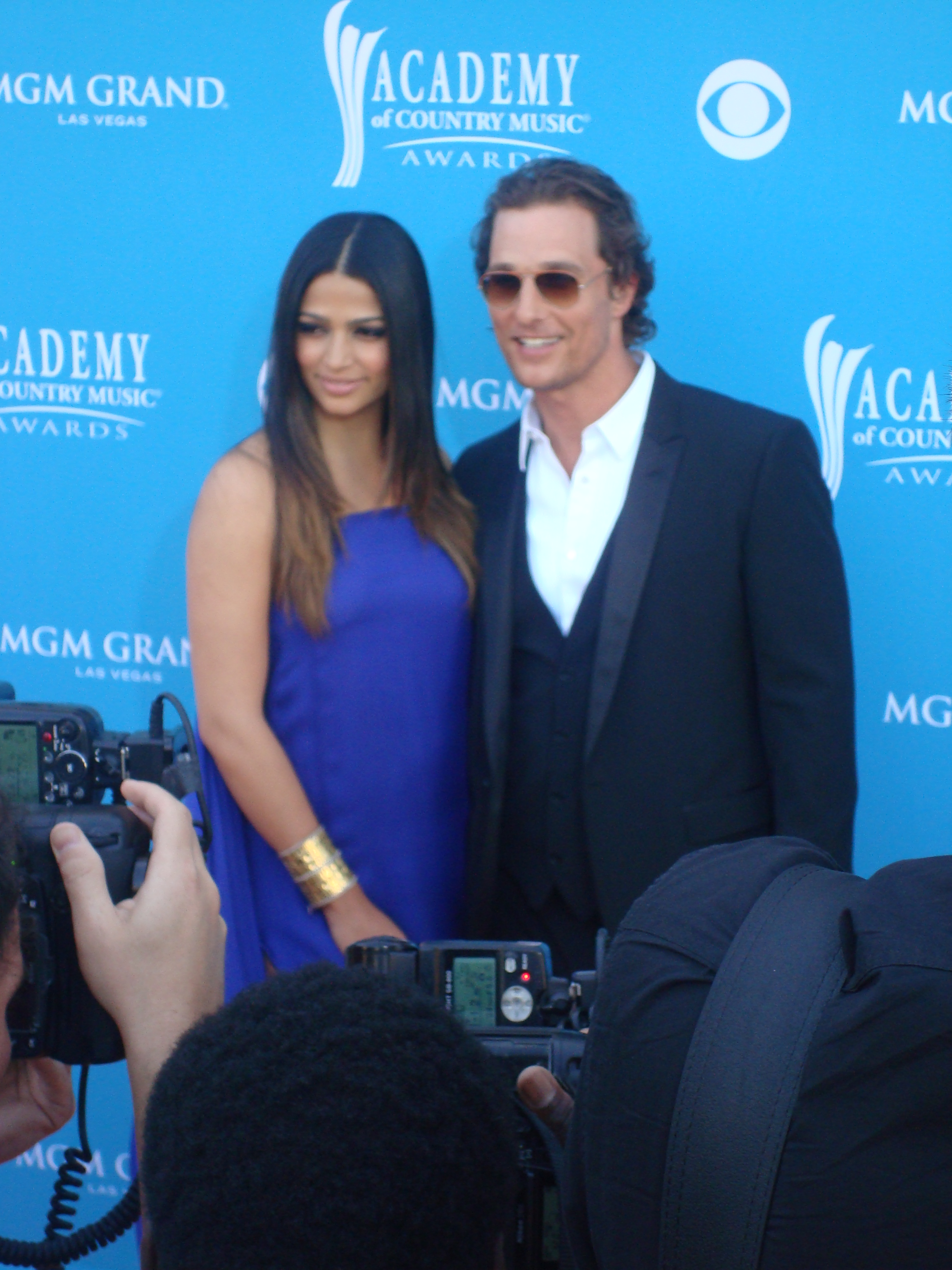
Alves with husband Matthew McConaughey

Alves met American actor Matthew McConaughey in 2006. The couple became engaged on Christmas Day in 2011 and were married in a private Catholic wedding ceremony on June 13, 2012, in Austin, Texas, where they reside. They have three children: a son born in July 2008, a daughter born in January 2010, and a second son born in December 2012. In 2021, McConaughey stated that meeting Alves inspired him to stop acting in rom-com movies.

On August 4, 2015, she became a U.S. citizen in the same naturalization ceremony as British actress Emily Blunt.

== Philanthropy ==
Alves and McConaughey founded the Just Keep Livin' Foundation in 2010. The foundation was the focus of a partnership with fashion brand Veronica Beard in 2019.

In May 2020, during the coronavirus pandemic, McConaughey and Alves distributed over 100,000 face masks to hospitals in Texas.

== Filmography ==
Television
Year	Title	Role	Notes
2010	Shear Genius	Herself	Host; 10 episodes
2013	The View	Herself	Guest co-host; Episode: "Camila Alves McConaughey (Guest Co-Hostess)/Patrick Stewart and Ian McKellen/Will Forte"
2014–2018	The Talk	Herself	Model, Guest co-host; 3 episodes
2015	Chopped Junior	Herself	Judge; Episode: "Cereal Miracles"
2016	Kids BBQ Championship	Herself	Co-host; 7 episodes

Music videos
Year	Title	Artist
2002	”Misunderstood”	Bon Jovi
2006	"Pullin' Me Back"	Chingy
2007	"Because of You"	Ne-Yo
