= Club Ripples =

Gay club in Long Beach, California, United States

- Address: 5101 E. Ocean Blvd. Long Beach, California; United States
- Owner: John Garcia, Larry Hebert
- Type: Gay bar, dance club

Construction
- Opened: 1972
- Closed: December 1, 2019

Club Ripples was the first gay dance club in Long Beach, California, and was owned by couple John Garcia and Larry Hebert. Herbert and Garcia owned Club Ripples since 1980.

The building that housed Club Ripples had a storied history before opening in 1972. It was an ice cream parlor in the 1940s. In the 1950s, it became a gay bar that closed in 1968. Sometime later, actress Shirley Temple's very first husband, John Agar, purchased the property and called the restaurant he opened there Land’s Inn.

Club Ripples was located at 5101 E. Ocean Blvd., Long Beach, California.

The club was the subject of an episode of the Bravo television series Tabatha Takes Over.

Club Ripples permanently closed on December 1, 2019.

On March 7, 2025, John Garcia passed away from an unknown illness.
