= Florence Frandsen Neslen =

American educator and artist

- Born: December 24, 1908; Moroni, Utah, U.S.
- Died: July 20, 2000 (aged 91)
- Resting place: Mount Olivet Cemetery
- Education: Brigham Young University; San Francisco Art Institute
- Occupations: Educator, painter
- Spouse: H. Edward Neslen

Florence Frandsen Neslen (December 24, 1908 – July 20, 2000) was an American educator and artist.

== Life ==
Frandsen was born on December 24, 1908, in Moroni, Utah. She graduated from Brigham Young University, where she was trained by B.F. Larsen and Calvin Fletcher, and she earned a bachelor's degree and a master's degree.

Frandsen worked as a public school teacher. She taught in many schools, including Springville High School and Granite High School. She became a watercolorist and an oil painter, and she was also a woodblock printer.

Frandsen married H. Edward Neslen, and became known as Florence Neslen. She died on July 20, 2000, and she was buried in Mount Olivet Cemetery in Salt Lake City. Two of her paintings are at the Springville Museum of Art.
