= Gina Glantz =

- Born: Gina Stritzler; New Jersey
- Education: B.A., 1965
- Alma mater: University of California, Berkeley
- Occupation: Political strategist
- Political party: Democratic Party
- Spouse: Ronald Glantz

Gina Glantz (born c. 1943) is a veteran political strategist and American Democratic campaign manager, field director, and consultant.

Glantz grew up in Westfield, New Jersey and raised her children in Ridgewood, New Jersey.

Glantz was senior advisor to Andy Stern, president of the Service Employees International Union. She was a fall 2009 Resident Fellow at the Institute of Politics at the Harvard Kennedy School. Glantz previously served as national campaign manager for Bill Bradley in the 2000 US Presidential election.

Glantz chairs the Planned Parenthood Action Fund and serves on the board of Demos, a nonpartisan public policy research and advocacy organization. and the National Leadership Advisory Council of the Association of American Colleges and Universities.

In 2014, she launched GenderAvenger.com, a non-profit organization that ensures women are represented in the public dialog.
