= Amanda Renee =

American novelist

- Occupation: Novelist
- Years active: 2013–present
- Notable work: Home to the Cowboy (2013), Blame it on the Rodeo(2014) Mistletoe Rodeo (2015)
- Awards: 2014 Golden Quill Best Category Series Award - Winner (Home to the Cowboy) 2014 New England Readers' Choice Awards - 2nd Place (Blame it on the Rodeo) 2015 RT Book Reviewers' Choice Award - Series Romance Nominee
- Website: www.amandarenee.com

Amanda Renee is an American romance novelist.

== Background ==
She was raised in Ridgewood, New Jersey United States and now lives in coastal South Carolina. She began writing at nine-years-old, but didn't pursue it seriously until she garnered praise for a school essay against music censorship. After she was discovered through Harlequin's So You Think You Can Write contest, she began writing for their American Romance line.

== Career ==
Amanda received "the call" from Harlequin on March 13, 2012 after she had submitted her manuscript to them through their So You Think You Can Write competition. Many of her books center around hippotherapy, a form of physical and occupational therapy that utilize the horse's movements to treat numerous conditions.

Each of Renee's books have charted in the Nielsen Bookscan Top 100 Adult Fiction Overall Fiction lists.

== Novels ==
=== Harlequin American Romance ===
- Betting on Texas was published by Harlequin Books March in 2013
- Home to the Cowboy was published by Harlequin Books in August 2013
- Blame it on the Rodeo was published by Harlequin Books in February 2014
- A Texan for Hire was published by Harlequin Books in March 2015
- Back to Texas was published by Harlequin Books in May 2015
- Mistletoe Rodeo was published by Harlequin Books in October 2015
- The Trouble with Cowgirls was published by Harlequin Books in June 2016

=== Harlequin Western Romance ===
- A Bull Rider's Pride was published by Harlequin Books in August 2016
- Twins for Christmas was published by Harlequin Books in December 2016
- The Lawman's Rebel Bride was published by Harlequin Books in July 2017
- A Snowbound Cowboy Christmas was published by Harlequin Books in November 2017
- Wrangling Cupid's Cowboy was published by Harlequin Books in January 2018
- The Bull Rider's Baby Bombshell was published by Harlequin Books in May 2018
- Montana Redemption was published by Harlequin Books in March 2019

=== Mills & Boon Australia Desire ===
- His Ultimate Test was published by Mills & Boon Australia in June 2014

=== Mills & Boon Australia Cherish ===
- A Bull Rider's Pride was published in large print hardcover by Mills & Boon Australia in September 2016
- The Lawman's Rebel Bride was published in large print hardcover and paperback by Mills & Boon Australia in June 2017
- A Snowbound Cowboy Christmas was published in large print hardcover and paperback by Mills & Boon Australia in October 2017
- Wrangling Cupid's Cowboy was published in large print hardcover and paperback by Mills & Boon Australia in February 2018

=== Mills & Boon United Kingdom American Romance ===
- Betting on Texas was published by Harlequin Books March in 2013
- Home to the Cowboy was published by Harlequin Books in August 2013
- Blame it on the Rodeo was published by Harlequin Books in February 2014
- A Texan for Hire was published by Harlequin Books in March 2015
- Back to Texas was published by Harlequin Books in May 2015
- Mistletoe Rodeo was published by Harlequin Books in October 2015

=== Mills & Boon United Kingdom Western Romance ===
- The Trouble with Cowboys was published by Harlequin Books June 2016
- Twins for Christmas was published by Harlequin Books December 2016

=== Mills & Boon United Kingdom Cherish ===
- A Bull RIder's Pride was published in paperback and large print hardcover by Mills & Boon United Kingdom August 2016
- The Lawman's Rebel Bride was published in large print hardcover and paperback by Mills & Boon United Kingdom in July 2017
- A Snowbound Cowboy Christmas was published in large print hardcover and paperback by Mills & Boon Australia in November 2017
- Wrangling Cupid's Cowboy was published in large print hardcover and paperback by Mills & Boon Australia in January 2018

== Awards ==
- Home to the Cowboy (August 2013) won the Golden Quill Best Category Series Award
- Blame it on the Rodeo (February 2014) was the runner-up in the 2014 New England Readers' Choice Awards
- Mistletoe Rodeo (October 2015) is nominated in the 2015 RT Book Reviewers' Choice Award - Series Romance

== Other ==
In addition to writing books, Amanda teaches creative writing through the Harlequin Online Community.
