= Tabatha Takes Over =

- Also known as: Tabatha's Salon Takeover (season 1–3)
- Genre: Reality
- Starring: Tabatha Coffey
- Country of origin: United States
- Original language: English
- No. of seasons: 5
- No. of episodes: 52

Production
- Executive producers: Eden Gaha; Page Hurwitz; Paul Franklin; Robin Feinberg; Tabatha Coffey
- Camera setup: Multi-camera
- Running time: 44 minutes
- Production company: Reveille Productions

Original release
- Network: Bravo
- Release: August 21, 2008 – June 27, 2013

Related
- Shear Genius

Tabatha Takes Over (titled Tabatha's Salon Takeover for the first three seasons) is an American reality television series on the Bravo network, in which former Shear Genius contestant and hair salon owner Tabatha Coffey helps failing salons turn around in one week. The series premiered on August 21, 2008, and is produced by Reveille Productions, a division of Shine Group.

In March 2011, Bravo announced that the fourth season of the series would be renamed Tabatha Takes Over and the premise would be expanded beyond just hair salons to include Coffey "taking over" various other small businesses and family enterprises. Season 4 premiered on January 10, 2012, with the final episode of the season airing on April 3, 2012. Tabatha Takes Over was renewed for Season 5 in December 2012. Season 5 premiered on April 4, 2013.

== Format ==
Tabatha Takes Over begins with Tabatha meeting the owner(s) of the business that she will take over; in Seasons 1 through 3, these were exclusively hair salons, but in Season 4, other struggling small businesses are featured (including a gay bar, a frozen yogurt parlor, and a dog grooming/doggie day care facility). During a discussion regarding the state of the business, Tabatha and the owner(s) watch surveillance tapes that invariably reveal poor management, unprofessional staff behavior, and uncomfortable/dissatisfied clientele; Tabatha demands the keys to the business and the takeover begins. Tabatha enters the business with the owner(s), informing the staff that she will take over and calls them out on what she has seen; she informs them that some staff could be in danger of losing their jobs. She then requests a tour ("The Inspection"), usually finding it dirty, unsanitary, and unorganized. She calls a staff meeting for the following day, during which she gets their point of view. After the staff meeting she brings in clients so she can assess the staff's work ("The Assessment"). By the end of the second day, she sits down with the owner and talks about what she thinks should be changed. The third day usually consists of team building or marketing the business and the beginning of the renovation. The renovation takes about 3 days. By the last day, "The Reopening" happens, where the salon starts anew and Tabatha assesses their improvements in a week. By the end of the day, she gives her "Final Recommendations" to the owner(s), announces to the staff the decisions of the owner(s) and gives the key back to the owner. After about 6 weeks, Tabatha comes back to see how/if the business has changed.

== Episodes ==
Season	Episodes	Originally aired	
Season	Episodes	Season premiere	Season finale
1	8	August 21, 2008	October 9, 2008
2	10	November 3, 2009	January 12, 2010
3	10	December 6, 2010	February 21, 2011
4	12	January 10, 2012	April 3, 2012
5	12	April 4, 2013	June 27, 2013

Season 1
No.	Salon	Location	Original airdate	
1	Ten Salon	Long Beach, California	August 21, 2008	
2	De Cielo Salon	Burbank, California	August 30, 2008	
3	Martino Cartier Salon (Branched to two different locations)	Sewell, New Jersey	September 3, 2008	
4	Images Salon	Oyster Bay, New York	September 9, 2008	
5	Salon Tika	Rockville Centre, New York	September 18, 2008	
6	The Loft on Broadway Salon	Long Beach, California	September 25, 2008	
7	Hairlab	Woodland Hills, California	October 2, 2008	
8	Candolyn's: Downtown	Los Angeles, California	October 9, 2008	
Season 2
No.	Salon	Location	Original airdate	
1	Orbit Salon	Chicago, Illinois	November 3, 2009	
2	Allure	Coconut Grove, Florida	November 10, 2009	
3	Eclectic Salon	Los Angeles, California	November 17, 2009	
4	Bang Salon (Under new management)	Fort Lauderdale, Florida	November 24, 2009	
5	Plush Salon	Chatsworth, California	December 1, 2009	
6	Brownes & Co.	Miami, Florida	December 8, 2009	
7	Refuge Salon	Los Angeles, California	December 15, 2009	
8	Chicago Male Salon & Spa	Chicago, Illinois	December 29, 2009	
9	Tantrum Salon	Covina, California	January 5, 2010	
10	Earth, Moon, Sun	Western Springs, Illinois	January 12, 2010	
Season 3
No.	Salon	Location	Original airdate	Viewers
1	Mia Bella	San Bruno, California	December 6, 2010	1,136,000
2	Christopher Hill	Brentwood, Los Angeles, California	December 13, 2010	1,052,000
3	Salon Vendome	Houston, Texas	December 20, 2010	1,011,000
4	West End Salon & Spa	Provincetown, Massachusetts	January 3, 2011	—N/a
5	Avanti Salon	Boston, Massachusetts	January 10, 2011	1,064,000
6	Touch of Elegance	Tewksbury, Massachusetts	January 24, 2011	1,235,000
7	Bqute	Palmdale, California	January 31, 2011	1,409,000
8	A Star Is Born	Mission Viejo, California	February 7, 2011	1,088,000
9	Concerto Salon & Spa	Valencia, California	February 14, 2011	—N/a
10	Revisit Show: Where Are They Now?	—N/a	February 21, 2011	1,140,000
Season 4
No.	Store	Location	Original airdate	Viewers
1	Jungle Red Salon	Minneapolis, Minnesota	January 10, 2012	862,000
2	Club Ripples	Long Beach, California	January 17, 2012	929,000
3	Beyond Hair Salon & Spa	Cherry Hill, New Jersey	January 24, 2012	1,057,000
4	Pat's Hair Shoppe	Douglasville, Georgia	January 31, 2012	914,000
5	Chill (Renamed Marie Shannon Confections)	Ventura, California	February 7, 2012	1,146,000
6	Salon Bridgette	Swedesboro, New Jersey	February 21, 2012	1,056,000
7	H Design	Minneapolis, Minnesota	February 28, 2012	896,000
8	Flavio Beauty College	Torrance, California	March 6, 2012	1,168,000
9	Barkingham Palace	West Hollywood, California	March 13, 2012	1,232,000
10	Sweetgrass	Atlanta, Georgia	March 20, 2012	1,030,000
11	Salon Deco	Atlanta, Georgia	March 27, 2012	945,000
12	Cinema Suites	Hollywood, California	April 3, 2012	921,000
Season 5
No.	Store	Location	Original airdate	Viewers
1	Salon Mogulz	Nashville, Tennessee	April 4, 2013	772,000
2	VIP Nightclub	Riverside, California	April 11, 2013	770,000
3	Top Cuts	Bethpage, New York	April 18, 2013	900,000
4	Nexgen Barber Shop	Murfreesboro, Tennessee	April 25, 2013	840,000
5	Summers Sports Bar	Manhattan Beach, California	May 2, 2013	853,000
6	Bombshells Salon and Spa	Clarksville, Tennessee	May 9, 2013	787,000
7	House of Synergy	Long Beach, California	May 23, 2013	1,032,000
8	Café Treats (Renamed Café de Mexico)	Sherman Oaks, California	May 30, 2013	713,000
9	Mani-Kir Royale Nail Salon	North Hollywood, California	June 6, 2013	828,000
10	Studio 157	Hendersonville, Tennessee	June 13, 2013	1,105,000
11	Nadia's Family Salon	Englishtown, New Jersey	June 20, 2013	737,000
12	Where Are They Now?	—N/a	June 27, 2013	752,000

== See also ==
- The Hotel Inspector
- Mary Queen of Shops
- Ramsay's Kitchen Nightmares
- Bar Rescue
