= Tara M. Chaplin =

American psychologist

- Born: Dayton, Ohio, USA
- Spouse: James McConnell (m. 2006)

Academic background
- Education: BA, Psychology, 1997, University of Delaware; PhD, child-clinical psychology, 2003, Pennsylvania State University
- Thesis: Emotional style, attributional style, gender, and depressive symptoms in older adolescents (2003)

Academic work
- Institutions: George Mason University; Yale University School of Medicine

Tara McConnell Chaplin is an American psychologist.

== Early life and education ==
Chaplin was born and raised in Montville, New Jersey by parents Dolcey and James Chaplin and graduated from Ridgewood High School. Following high school, she attended the University of Delaware for her Bachelor of Arts degree in psychology and Penn State University for her PhD in child-clinical psychology. With her doctoral degree, Chaplin earned a post-doctoral associate position at Yale University.

== Career ==
Upon completing her post doctoral research, Chaplin was promoted to Associate Research Scientist and assistant professor of psychiatry at Yale University School of Medicine. In her role as an Associate Research Scientist, she led a study examining the differences between men and women's reactions to stress-related psychological disorders. Chaplin concluded that women have greater rates of depression than men, who often experience greater rates of alcohol-use disorders. The following year, she received a five-year $774,714 grant from the National Institutes of Health to fund research on Gender, Emotional Arousal, and Risk for Adolescent Substance Abuse. She collaborated with Amelia Aldao of Ohio State University to research how the emotional response of children varied based on who was observing them. They concluded that when children were around their parents, they regulated their emotions less than when they were surrounded by peers.

Chaplin eventually left Yale University in 2013 to accept an assistant professor of psychology position at George Mason University (GMU). At GMU, she runs the Youth Emotion Lab and continues to focus on the role of "gender and emotion regulation in the development of psychopathology and substance abuse in children and adolescence." In 2018, she received a five-year, $2.5 million grant to study predicting factors of substance and alcohol abuse in preteens' brain patterns as they move through puberty.

== Personal life ==
Chaplin and her husband have one son together.
