= Janet Warren Neslen =

American physician

- Born: 1924; Ridgewood, New Jersey, U.S.
- Died: between 2015 and 2021
- Occupations: Physician, public health official

Janet Warren Neslen (1924 – between 2015 and 2021) was an American physician and public health official based in Carroll County, Maryland.

== Early life ==
Janet Warren was from Ridgewood, New Jersey, the daughter of William Spickers Warren and Janet Blackburn Jordan Warren. She graduated from Ridgewood High School in 1942, and from Mount Holyoke College in 1945. While at Mount Holyoke, she was honored for her work on the college's victory garden, and she became a member of Phi Beta Kappa. She earned her medical degree from Columbia University's medical school in 1949. In 1974 she earned a master's degree in public health at Johns Hopkins University.

== Career ==
Neslen was a public health officer in Washington, D.C., beginning in the 1950s. As chief of the School Health Division, she led the campaign to vaccinate children in the district against rubella. "It's not the financial cost but the human cost of the damage to unborn babies that we should consider," she told an interviewer in 1969. "If we can prevent the damage it is just plain foolishness not to go to all lengths to do so."

In 1978, Neslen joined the staff of Forest Haven as deputy superintendent and chief medical officer. She was head officer of the Carroll County Health Department from 1981 to 1996. From 1986 to 1987, she also served as Acting Assistant Secretary for Health in the Maryland Department of Health and Mental Hygiene. She created an outreach program to teach women about HIV/AIDS, and expanded a program for pregnant teenagers. In 2000 she served on the Maryland Fetal and Infant Mortality Review Board.

Neslen was president of the Westminster Soroptimist Club and co-president of the Carroll County League of Women Voters (LWV). In 1984 she received an award from the Westminster Soroptimists for her work on women's health. She received a medal from Carroll Community College for her advocacy of higher education. In 1995, she received the Shirley Chace Phillips Award from the LWV. In 1997, Neslen was the first inductee into the Carroll County Women's Hall of Fame. The Partnership for a Healthier Carroll County named an award in her honor.

== Personal life and legacy ==
Janet Warren married a fellow medical student, Earl D. Neslen, in 1948. They had four sons together. The Partnership for a Healthier Carroll County established the Dr. Janet W. Neslen Award in 2002, to recognize "an individual or organization proven to be outstanding in efforts to improve access to health care in Carroll County". Her husband died in 2010, and she died between 2015 and 2021.
