= Sean Schimmel =

American swimming coach (born 1969)

Biographical details
- Born: January 10, 1969 (age 57); New York, New York, US
- Education: University Southern California '92

Playing career
- 1987-1991: University of Southern California; Mentored by Coach Peter Daland
- Positions: Butterfly, Freestyle

Coaching career (HC unless noted)
- 2024-2026: Penn State University
- 2023-2024: Miami of Ohio
- 2016-2022: University of Georgia
- 2012-2016: University of Arkansas
- 2008-2012: University of Maryland
- 2006-2008: Louisiana State University
- 1999-2006: Harvard University (Asst. Coach); Mentored by Tim Murphey
- 1998-1999: Crescenta-Canada YMCA; California
- 1991-1992: New Jersey Wave (Asst. Coach)

Head coaching record
- Overall: 58-4 dual team record (Harvard University)

Accomplishments and honors

Championships
- 4 x Eastern Intercollegiate Championships (Harvard University)

Sean Schimmel (born January 10, 1969) is an American swimming coach who competed for the University of Southern California and led Harvard University to four Eastern Intercollegiate Championships as an assistant coach from 1999-2006. He coached at Louisiana State from 2006-2008, and returned to coach there after 2024. He coached at University of Georgia from 2016-2022 as an assistant coach.

== Early life ==
Schimmel was born January 10, 1969, in New York City. He grew up in Ridgewood, New Jersey, and attended Ridgewood High School, graduating in 1987. He earned All-American honors in High School as a result of his achievements in the 50 freestyle and 100 butterfly. In January 1984, he swam for the Paramus, New Jersey Red Wave where he was coached by Karen Kahulik, and set both meet and age group records at the Northern New Jersey Invitational Swim Club for the 13-14 age group. At the meet he placed first and set meet records in the 100 freestyle, the 100 butterfly, the 500 freestyle, and the 200 individual medley. He established New Jersey state records while training and representing the New Jersey Wave swim club, and set a state-record in the 200 butterfly, where he established a time of 1:47.39 in the 200 fly that held for many years as the state record.

== University of Southern California ==
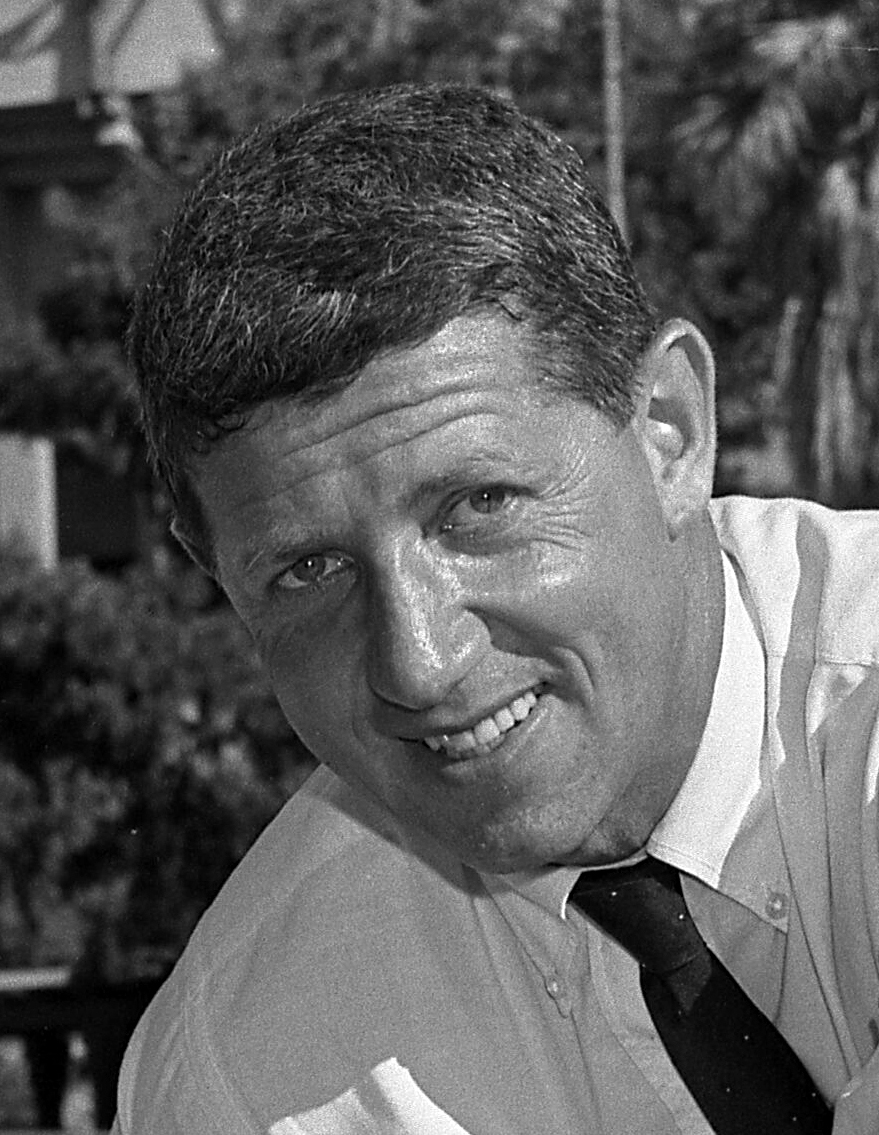
USC Coach Peter Daland, 1964

Schimmel graduated from the University of Southern California in 1992. Schimmel competed in swimming at the University of Southern California from 1987-91 for Hall of Fame Coach Peter Daland, where in 1992, he was awarded a B.A. in communications. A freestyle and butterly, in the 100 and 200 fly, he qualified for the 1988 U.S. Olympic Trials.

He married Tricia Starr with whom he had a daughter.

== Coaching ==
Immediately following his High School career, he was an assistant coach for the New Jersey Wave from 1991-92. From 1998-1999, he coached California's Crescenta-Canada YMCA, leading some of his athletes to the YMCA National Championships. From 1999-2006, he coached seven seasons as an Assistant Coach for the strong program at Harvard University under Tim Murphy. At Harvard, Schimmel had an impressive dual meet record of 58-4, and helped lead the team to four Championships in the Eastern Intercollegiate Swim Conference. From 2006-2008, he coached at LSU, where in his first year as the head of the men's and women's teams in 2007, five of his swimmers earned honors as All Americans by the NCAA. The Harvard swim team broke fourteen school records during his tenure with the team.

Schimmel's initial collegiate head coaching position was at the University of Maryland from 2008-2012 before the team was cut for lack of funding. From 2012-2016, he coached for the University of Arkansas women's team, where he led them to twenty-sixth place in the NCAA Championships in his first year in 2013. From 2016-2022, he coached for the University of Georgia, where he was an assistant coach and coached the ABSC Pro Dawgs. From 2022-2024, he coached at Louisiana State University, then coached briefly at University of Miami, Oxford Ohio. He coached at Penn State in the 2024-26 seasons.
