= Sally Hershberger =

American hair stylist (born 1961)

- Born: 1961 (age 64–65); Kansas
- Occupation: Celebrity hairstylist
- Known for: National salons, signature haircuts, hair products

Sally Hershberger (born 1961) is an American hair stylist known for her bicoastal salons, a line of hair products, creating Meg Ryan’s signature choppy-style haircut, the “Sally Shag”, and appearing on the Bravo reality show, Shear Genius.

The character of Shane on the TV series The L Word is rumored to be based on Hershberger.

== Early life ==
Born in Kansas, she moved to California after high school. Hershberger began cutting hair after her mother told her she needed to do something with her life when she turned 18. She started working with Arthur Johns as a hair stylist and then was assigned to tour with Olivia Newton-John, which "propelled her career," according to the Los Angeles Times. On the tour, she met photographer Herb Ritts, who had an influence on her aesthetic sensibilities.

== Career ==
Hershberger created Meg Ryan's shag haircut. She also styled the hair for the First Family (the Obamas) for an article that was featured in Vogue. She also is a co-creator, with John Frieda, of two hair care lines started in the 90s called Sheer Blonde and Beach Blonde. These lines brought in $50 million of the companies $120 million annual revenues, according to Gail Federici, former president of John Frieda Professional Hair Care. In 2008, she started her first "solo hair care line," called Supreme Mead. Hershberger has also created a jeans and T-shirt line called Shagg Downtown collection which was set to release in 2006. The line was targeted for "better specialty stores."

She is reportedly the first stylist in New York to charge US$600.00 for a haircut. She currently charges US$800.00 for a haircut. According to an article posted in the Palm Beach Post, she is the "first woman to achieve the status of an Oribe or Frederic Fekkai."

Hershberger has also been featured on the Bravo reality television series, Shear Genius.

== Salons ==
Hershberger has three salons, one in Los Angeles and two in New York City. Her Los Angeles Salon, located on La Cienega Boulevard, was the first to open followed by her New York City uptown location, now co-owned and operated by Sharon Dorram of Sharon Dorram Color. The second New York location is in the heart of the Meatpacking district. She opened another salon in 2018 in partnership with Barneys New York.
