= Tabatha Coffey =

Australian hairstylist

- Coffey in 2013
- Born: May 17, 1969 (age 57); Brisbane, Queensland, Australia
- Occupations: Hairstylist; salon owner; television personality; author
- Years active: 1983-present (hair stylist); 2007-present (TV personality)
- Television: Shear Genius; Tabatha Takes Over; Relative Success with Tabatha
- Partner: Diane Keeler (m. 1998; died 2022)
- Website: tabathacoffey.com

Tabatha Coffey is an Australian hairstylist, salon owner, and television personality based in the United States. Her participation as a contestant on the television show Shear Genius in 2007 led to her own fame in the U.S. She starred in a television show, Tabatha Takes Over (2008–13), which aired on the US cable television network Bravo. A similar series, Relative Success with Tabatha, aired on Bravo in 2018.

== Early life ==
Coffey was born in Brisbane, Queensland, and raised in Surfers Paradise on the Gold Coast.

== Career ==
Coffey opened her own salon, Industrie Hair Gurus, in Ridgewood, New Jersey. She also styles clients at the Warren-Tricomi salon in West Hollywood. Her approach is transformative, creating a special look for each individual, unlike other stylists who specialize in a certain look. She also works as a platform artist for hair care products company, Joico International. She tours different countries 6–12 times a year doing hair shows for the company. "My favourite thing is to do work with other professionals and teaching," she said in an interview. "I love giving and getting back from other professionals."

She has also been in beauty publications, as well as backstage in New York's Mercedes Benz Fashion Week. She works regularly as an editorial stylist for top fashion and beauty publications, including Seventeen, Marie Claire, and Mademoiselle.

Coffey has written two books: It's Not Really About the Hair: The Honest Truth About Life, Love, and the Business of Beauty (2011) and Own It!: Be the Boss of Your Life--at Home and in the Workplace (2014). Both were published by HarperCollins.

== Television ==
Coffey was first introduced to American audiences when she became a contestant in the Bravo reality show Shear Genius. Having auditioned out of curiosity, she quickly earned a reputation for her outspokenness and intensity. She was a front-runner in the competition, winning most of the challenges during her stay, but she was eliminated in the sixth episode, along with her teammate for the day, Tyson. She has made no secret of her objections to Tyson's methods, thinking his ego got in the way of his work. The judges eliminated them for their poor teamwork. Coffey later won $10,000 as the show's Fan Favorite.

In 2008, Coffey was approached by Bravo to star in the reality series Tabatha's Salon Takeover in which she uses her hairdressing and business expertise to assist salons that are in danger of closing. The show was renamed Tabatha Takes Over for its fourth season where she used the same formulas to invigorate other types of businesses such as bars and restaurants. She has also appeared on Make Me a Supermodel Season 2, The Tyra Banks Show as a part of Banks's "Glam Squad," and The Biggest Loser along with Tim Gunn, giving makeovers to the show's contestants.

In 2011, Coffey was the host for the NAHA awards.

In 2018, Coffey's new show, Relative Success with Tabatha, aired on Bravo. Coffey uses her business expertise to help struggling families come together not only to help the business but the family as well.

== Personal life ==
An out member of the LGBT community, Coffey has mentioned in interviews that she struggled with revealing her sexuality to her family, specifically her mother, with whom she was very close. In episode 4 of Relative Success, she mentions that her mother briefly disowned her after coming out, however the two would later reconcile.

Coffey was in a long-term relationship with Diane Keeler, a New York native and former salon client, for 25 years. Coffey, though open about her sexuality, had kept the relationship out of the public eye at the request of Keeler. In a 2024 interview with People magazine, she revealed that Keeler had been diagnosed with Grade 4 glioblastoma in 2014, and suffered a stroke in 2018, which severely limited her speech and mobility. Coffey became her full-time caretaker until Keeler's death in June 2022. Speaking on the effect the loss has on her, she states "I'm not the same woman and I'm okay with it ... I don't want to be the same woman."

Coffey partnered with a creative director named Ty Jennings to co-found ThriveHive, a web-based support service offering member events, community forums, and classes to those seeking personal and professional development. Following the death of Keeler, Coffey focused on providing support to other caregivers, saying, "No one cares for the caregiver ... That's why it's so important for caregivers to find the support they need and also to be able to give that to themselves."
