= Shear Genius =

American reality TV program (2007–2010)

- Genre: Reality television
- Presented by: Jaclyn Smith; Camila Alves
- Starring: René Fris; Orlando Pita
- Judges: Jaclyn Smith; Sally Hershberger; Michael Carl; Kim Vo; Kelly Atterton; Camila Alves; Jonathan Antin
- Country of origin: United States
- Original language: English
- No. of seasons: 3
- No. of episodes: 29

Production
- Running time: 42 minutes
- Production company: Reveille Productions

Original release
- Network: Bravo
- Release: April 11, 2007 – April 7, 2010

Related
- Tabatha Takes Over

Shear Genius is an American reality television series on the Bravo network that focuses on hair styling. The show ran for three seasons, from April 2007 to April 2010. It was hosted by actress Jaclyn Smith in seasons one and two and by Brazilian model Camila Alves for season three.

In the show, contestants compete with each other to create the best hair style and are usually restricted in time, materials, and theme. Their designs are judged and one or more stylists are eliminated each week, until the winner is determined.

== Broadcast ==
The first season of the show aired in April and May 2007, immediately after the low-rated Top Design wrapped up its run. Unlike its predecessor, however, Shear Genius became a word-of-mouth fan favorite and a second season started airing in June 2008. Despite the comparative lack of success for Top Design, it was also renewed.

== Judges ==
As of the third season, the judging panel includes Camila Alves, Kim Vo and Jonathan Antin. Previous judges included Jaclyn Smith, Sally Hershberger, Michael Carl and Kelly Atterton. Mentors René Fris (seasons 1–2) and Orlando Pita (season 3), though not a permanent, judges are featured in every episode. Usually, an additional guest judge will sit in on the panel every week.

== Format ==
=== Contestants ===
Each season of the show consists of 9–10 episodes and starts with 12 contestants. In each episode one contestant is eliminated, though in rare cases there may be a double elimination or no elimination at all, based on the consensus of the judging panel.

=== Challenges ===
There are two challenges in each episode:

==== Shortcut Challenge ====
The first challenge is the Shortcut Challenge which is usually not for eliminating one of the contestants, although in the third episode of the first season, one competitor was "sent home" after the Shortcut Challenge. The challenge ranks the contestants based on a judging factor, usually technical skills. The winning contestant(s) may receive some benefit in the next challenge.

==== Elimination Challenge ====
The second is the Elimination Challenge, which has each contestant style the hair on a real model or client given certain requirements or goals. After completing the hair, the model is dressed appropriately, and a runway show is held for the four judges.

After the show, the judges may ask questions of the contestants about their styling choices. The judges then confer among themselves and decide on the top and bottom styles. The top stylists are credited and a single winning stylist is selected, with the following phrase: "Your work is Shear Genius". A picture of their style is also displayed on the Allure Wall of Fame for the remainder of the competition. The bottom stylists are then identified, and the worst stylist is sent home with the show's tag line: "This was your final cut."

Both challenges were timed, and if additional materials were necessary, the contestants are given a limited budget for those supplies. The first three challenges of Season 1 used mannequin heads instead of real clients.

== Seasons ==
=== Season 1 ===
The first season first aired in April and May 2007. 12 stylists competed in various challenges to win the title of Shear Genius. Anthony Morrison defeated Ben Mollin and Daisy Duchens to become the winner of Season 1.

Tabatha's Salon Takeover was spun off from the series, featuring contestant Tabatha Coffey, known for her blunt, direct style with the other contestants. Tabatha made it to the Final 6 of the competition. Tabatha also was the first ever Shear Genius "fan favorite" winner, for which she received $10,000.

=== Season 2 ===
The second season of Shear Genius began airing on Bravo on June 25, 2008. Sally Hershberger and Michael Carl were replaced by Kim Vo and Kelly Atterton. Dee Adames defeated Charlie Price and Nicole Obert to become the winner of season 2.

Like the first season, Bravo also had a fan favorite competition for Shear Genius. Daniel Lewis, who was in the Final 4, was fan favorite of season 2.

=== Season 3 ===
The third season of Shear Genius started airing on February 3, 2010, on Bravo. Brazilian model Camila Alves, fiancée, and now spouse of Matthew McConaughey, took over hosting duties from Jaclyn Smith while Orlando Pita took over mentoring duties from Rene Fris. Brig Van Osten, the dark horse, beat out both Matthew Morris and Brig's bitter rival on the show, Janine Jarman to win Season 3, the prizes included the opportunity to style hair for an Allure Magazine photoshoot and $100,000. Janine Jarman, who placed second, was awarded fan favorite.

== International versions ==
Country	Show Name	Network	Winners	Host
Brazil	Por Um Fio; Hang by a Thread	GNT	Season 1, 2010: Gabriela Gusso; Season 2, 2011: Upcoming season	Juliana Paes (Season 1–present)
China	发动奇迹; Shear Genius	SMG Entertainment	Season 1, 2011: Upcoming season	航悦(Hang Yue) (Season 1–present)
