= List of Song Exploder episodes =

Song Exploder is a podcast "where musicians take apart their songs, and piece by piece, tell the story of how they were made." It is hosted by its producer, editor, and creator Hrishikesh Hirway. Episodes have featured Hirway taking a deep-dive into Kiss from a Rose with Seal and Trevor Horn and into Blue Monday with Peter Hook—formerly of New Order.

Song Exploder began on January 1, 2014. To date, 314 episodes have been released.

== Episodes ==
No.	Artist	Song	Original release date
1	The Postal Service	"The District Sleeps Alone Tonight"	January 1, 2014
2	The Album Leaf	"The Outer Banks"	January 15, 2014
3	Yacht	"Plastic Soul"	February 1, 2014
4	Baths	"Miasma Sky"	February 14, 2014
5	Sea Wolf	"Kasper"	March 1, 2014
6	Daedelus	"Experience"	March 17, 2014
7	Jeff Beal	"House of Cards (Main Title Theme)"	April 1, 2014
8	Loren Bouchard	"Bob's Burgers" (Theme Song)	April 15, 2014
9	Poliça	"Smug"	May 1, 2014
10	Garbage	"Felt"	May 15, 2014
11	Nite Jewel	"One Second of Love"	June 2, 2014
12	Converge	"Dark Horse"	June 19, 2014
13	The Microphones	"I Want Wind to Blow"	July 1, 2014
14	Open Mike Eagle featuring Toy Light	"Dark Comedy Morning Show"	July 15, 2014
15	Brian Reitzell	Watch Dogs ("Donovan")	August 6, 2014
16	Spoon	"Inside Out"	August 19, 2014
17	Anamanaguchi	"Prom Night"	September 2, 2014
18	The Thermals	"No Culture Icons"	September 18, 2014
19	RAC featuring Kele & MNDR	"Let Go"	October 1, 2014
20	Valley Lodge	"Go" (Theme to "Last Week Tonight")	October 15, 2014
21	Julia Holter	"Horns Surrounding Me"	October 29, 2014
22	The Books	"Smells Like Content"	November 12, 2014
23	Stars	"No One Is Lost"	November 26, 2014
24	Tycho	"Awake"	December 8, 2014
25	The National	"Sea of Love"	December 22, 2014
26	Ghostface Killah	"The Battlefield"	January 6, 2015
27	Blonde Redhead	"Penultimo"	January 19, 2015
28	The Long Winters	"The Commander Thinks Aloud"	January 30, 2015
29	Alexandre Desplat	"The Imitation Game"	February 9, 2015
30	Jeremy Zuckerman	"The Legend of Korra"	February 20, 2015
31	Warpaint	"Love Is to Die"	March 3, 2015
32	White Hinterland	"Ring the Bell"	March 13, 2015
33	How to Dress Well	"Pour Cyril"	March 25, 2015
34	RJD2 featuring Kenna	"Games You Can Win"	April 1, 2015
35	Toro y Moi	"Half Dome"	April 14, 2015
36	My Morning Jacket	"Spring (Among the Living)"	April 23, 2015
37	John Lunn	"Downton Abbey"	May 5, 2015
38	Tune-Yards	"Water Fountain"	May 18, 2015
39	Brian Tyler	"Avengers: Age of Ultron"	May 28, 2015
40	Ramin Djawadi	"Game of Thrones (Main Title Theme)"	June 11, 2015
41	Will Butler	"Anna"	June 22, 2015
42	U2	"Cedarwood Road"	June 29, 2015
43	Sylvan Esso	"Coffee"	July 8, 2015
44	Death Cab for Cutie	"El Dorado"	July 20, 2015
45	Thundercat	"Them Changes"	July 30, 2015
46	Unknown Mortal Orchestra	"Multi-Love"	August 10, 2015
47	Health	"Stonefist"	August 18, 2015
48	Best Coast	"Feeling Ok"	August 27, 2015
49	American Football	"The One with the Tambourine"	September 3, 2015
50	Joey Badass	"Hazeus View"	September 15, 2015
51	The Magnetic Fields	"Andrew in Drag"	September 24, 2015
52	Deradoorian	"A Beautiful Woman"	October 5, 2015
53	Harry Gregson-Williams	"The Martian"	October 15, 2015
54	Chet Faker	"Gold"	October 26, 2015
55	The Arcs	"Put a Flower in Your Pocket"	November 5, 2015
56	Youth Lagoon	"The Knower"	November 16, 2015
57	Natalia Lafourcade	"Hasta la Raíz"	November 23, 2015
58	Wilco	"Magnetized"	December 2, 2015
59	Dustin O'Halloran	"Transparent (Main Title Theme)"	December 11, 2015
60	Björk	"Stonemilker"	December 17, 2015
61	Courtney Barnett	"Depreston"	January 7, 2016
62	MGMT	"Time to Pretend"	January 19, 2016
63	Kelela	"Rewind"	January 28, 2016
64	The New Pornographers	"Brill Bruisers"	February 8, 2016
65	clipping.	"Work Work"	February 18, 2016
66	KT Tunstall	"Suddenly I See"	March 1, 2016
67	Oneohtrix Point Never	"Sticky Drama"	March 10, 2016
68	Iggy Pop	"American Valhalla"	March 21, 2016
69	Thao & the Get Down Stay Down	"Astonished Man"	April 5, 2016
70	Weezer	"Summer Elaine and Drunk Dori"	April 18, 2016
71	The Lumineers	"Ophelia"	April 28, 2016
72	Carly Rae Jepsen	"When I Needed You"	May 9, 2016
73	Busdriver	"Worlds to Run"	May 24, 2016
74	Old Crow Medicine Show	"Dearly Departed Friend"	May 29, 2016
75	Odesza	"Kusanagi"	June 14, 2016
76	Chvrches	"Clearest Blue"	June 23, 2016
77	Andrew Bird	"Roma Fade"	July 5, 2016
78	Grimes	"Kill V. Maim"	July 14, 2016
79	Band of Horses	"Solemn Oath"	July 25, 2016
80	Patrick Carney featuring Ralph Carney	"Bojack Horseman (Main Title Theme)"	August 4, 2016
81	Andra Day	"Forever Mine"	August 15, 2016
82	Tobacco	"Gods in Heat"	August 25, 2016
83	Mitski	"Your Best American Girl"	September 7, 2016
84	Peter Bjorn and John	"Young Folks"	September 21, 2016
85	Phantogram	"You Don't Get Me High Anymore"	October 6, 2016
86	James Vincent McMorrow	"Get Low"	October 19, 2016
87	Oathbreaker	"Second Son of R."	October 28, 2016
88	Flatbush Zombies	"Bounce"	November 8, 2016
89	Jóhann Jóhannsson	"Heptapod B" from the Arrival Score	November 17, 2016
90	Angel Olsen	"Shut Up Kiss Me"	November 30, 2016
91	DJ Shadow	"Mutual Slump"	December 8, 2016
92	Justin Hurwitz	"Audition (The Fools Who Dream)"	December 21, 2016
93	Metallica	"Moth into Flame"	January 6, 2017
94	Solange	"Cranes in the Sky"	January 16, 2017
95	Nicholas Britell	"Little's Theme", "Chiron's Theme" and "Black's Theme" from the Moonlight score	January 30, 2017
96	Dropkick Murphys	"Blood"	February 7, 2017
97	Sara Watkins	"Without A Word"	February 17, 2017
98	Bonobo	"Break Apart (feat. Rhye)"	February 28, 2017
99	Sleigh Bells	"I Can Only Stare"	March 14, 2017
100	Dirty Projectors	"Up In Hudson"	March 21, 2017
101	Norah Jones	"Day Breaks"	March 30, 2017
102	Gorillaz	"Andromeda (feat. D.R.A.M.)"	April 11, 2017
103	Aimee Mann	"Patient Zero"	April 21, 2017
104	Little Dragon	"Sweet"	May 2, 2017
105	Perfume Genius	"Slip Away"	May 11, 2017
106	Michael Kiwanuka	"Black Man in a White World"	May 22, 2017
107	alt-j	"In Cold Blood"	June 2, 2017
108	Michelle Branch	"Best You Ever"	June 14, 2017
109	Fleet Foxes	"Mearcstapa"	June 22, 2017
110	Goapele	"Stand"	July 5, 2017
111	Slowdive	"Sugar for the Pill"	July 13, 2017
112	Phoenix	"Ti Amo"	July 25, 2017
113	Grizzly Bear	"Four Cypresses"	August 23, 2017
114	St. Vincent	"New York"	August 15, 2017
115	Maggie Rogers	"Alaska"	August 24, 2017
116	Ibeyi	"Deathless"	September 5, 2017
117	Rostam	"Bike Dream"	September 14, 2017
118	Lorde	"Sober"	September 25, 2017
119	The Killers	"Rut"	October 6, 2017
120	TOKiMONSTA	"Bibimbap"	October 18, 2017
121	Kyle Dixon & Michael Stein	"Stranger Things (Main Title Theme)"	October 26, 2017
122	Rachel Platten	"Broken Glass"	November 8, 2017
123	Lin-Manuel Miranda	"Almost Like Praying"	November 22, 2017
124	Nine Inch Nails	"The Lovers"	December 6, 2017
125	R.E.M.	"Try Not To Breathe"	December 20, 2017
126	The Roots	"It Ain't Fair" (feat. Bilal)	January 3, 2018
127	Julien Baker	"Appointments"	January 17, 2018
128	Bleachers	"I Miss Those Days"	January 31, 2018
129	Moses Sumney	"Quarrel"	February 14, 2018
130	Natalie Prass	"Short Court Style"	February 28, 2018
131	Ludwig Göransson	"Black Panther"	March 14, 2018
132	Jack Johnson	"You Can't Control It"	March 28, 2018
133	Kimbra	"Top of the World"	April 11, 2018
134	Arcade Fire	"Put Your Money On Me"	April 25, 2018
135	Liz Phair	"Divorce Song"	May 9, 2018
136	Jon Hopkins	"Luminous Beings"	May 23, 2018
137	Wolf Alice	"Don't Delete the Kisses"	June 6, 2018
138	Yo La Tengo	"Here You Are"	June 20, 2018
139	Jhené Aiko	"Sativa" (feat. Swae Lee)	July 4, 2018
140	Action Bronson	"The Chairman's Intent"	July 18, 2018
141	Neko Case	"Last Lion of Albion"	August 1, 2018
142	Christine and the Queens	"Doesn't Matter"	August 15, 2018
143	The Decemberists	"Once in My Life"	September 6, 2018
144	Blood Orange	"Saint"	September 25, 2018
145	Cat Power	"Woman"	October 5, 2018
146	Janelle Monáe	"So Afraid"	October 15, 2018
147	John Carpenter	"Halloween (Theme)"	October 26, 2018
148	Big Boi	"Order of Operations"	November 5, 2018
149	Empress Of	"When I'm With Him"	November 19, 2018
Bonus	Breakmaster Cylinder	"Reply All"	November 26, 2018
150	Fleetwood Mac	"Go Your Own Way"	December 5, 2018
Special	Yo-Yo Ma	"Prelude, Cello Suite No. 1 in G Major" by Johann Sebastian Bach	December 20, 2018
151	Hozier	"Nina Cried Power (feat. Mavis Staples)"	January 9, 2019
152	Japanese Breakfast	"Boyish"	January 23, 2019
Bonus	Wonderly	"The Daily (Theme)"	February 6, 2019
153	Phoebe Bridgers	"Scott Street"	February 20, 2019
154	Mumford & Sons	"Beloved"	March 6, 2019
155	Nakhane	"New Brighton" (feat. Anohni)	March 20, 2019
156	Sharon Van Etten	"Seventeen"	April 3, 2019
157	Panda Bear	"Dolphin"	April 17, 2019
158	The Cranberries	"All Over Now"	May 2, 2019
159	The Mountain Goats	"Cadaver Sniffing Dog"	May 16, 2019
160	Raleigh Ritchie	"Time in a Tree"	May 29, 2019
161	Sheryl Crow	"Redemption Day" (feat. Johnny Cash)	June 12, 2019
162	Big Thief	"Cattails"	June 26, 2019
163	Jamila Woods	"BALDWIN"	July 10, 2019
164	Denzel Curry	"RICKY"	July 24, 2019
165	Sleater-Kinney	"The Future is Here"	August 7, 2019
166	Bon Iver	"Holyfields"	August 21, 2019
167	Robyn	"Honey"	September 4, 2019
168	Brittany Howard	"Stay High"	September 18, 2019
169	Clairo	"Alewife"	October 2, 2019
170	Raphael Saadiq	"Kings Fall"	October 16, 2019
171	Slipknot	"Unsainted"	October 30, 2019
172	Jay Som	"Tenderness"	November 13, 2019
173	Bat For Lashes	"Kids in the Dark"	November 27, 2019
174	Meek Mill	"Trauma"	December 11, 2019
Bonus	Hrishikesh Hirway	"Intro Theme and Thao's Farewell"	December 18, 2019
175	Vampire Weekend	"Harmony Hall"	December 25, 2019
176	Semisonic	"Closing Time"	January 15, 2020
177	Vagabon	"Water Me Down"	January 29, 2020
178	Caribou	"Home"	February 12, 2020
179	Soccer Mommy	"Circle the Drain"	February 26, 2020
180	Eric Nam	"Love Die Young"	March 11, 2020
181	Nathaniel Rateliff	"And It's Still Alright"	March 25, 2020
182	FKA Twigs	"Mirrored Heart"	April 8, 2020
183	Tame Impala	"It Might Be Time"	April 22, 2020
184	Laura Marling	"Song For Our Daughter"	May 6, 2020
185	100 gecs	"money machine"	May 20, 2020
186	Mobb Deep	"Shook Ones, Pt. II"	June 17, 2020
187	Apparat	"Goodbye (Theme from "Dark")"	July 1, 2020
188	Khruangbin	"So We Won't Forget"	July 15, 2020
189	Waxahatchee	"Fire"	July 29, 2020
190	The 1975	"The Birthday Party"	August 12, 2020
191	Black Pumas	"Colors"	August 26, 2020
192	Kelly Lee Owens	"On"	September 9, 2020
193	Selena Gomez	"Lose You to Love Me"	September 23, 2020
194	Dua Lipa	"Levitating"	October 7, 2020
195	Run the Jewels	"Ju$t"	October 21, 2020
196	Deftones	"Ohms"	November 4, 2020
197	Billie Eilish	"everything i wanted"	November 18, 2020
198	Jewel	"You Were Meant for Me"	December 2, 2020
199	Common	"A Riot In My Mind"	December 16, 2020
200	Yusuf / Cat Stevens	"Father and Son"	January 13, 2021
201	HAIM	"Summer Girl"	January 27, 2021
202	PJ Morton	"Say So" (feat. JoJo)	February 10, 2021
203	Sasha Sloan	"Until It Happens To You"	February 24, 2021
204	Glass Animals	"Heat Waves"	March 10, 2021
205	Jon Batiste	"We Are"	March 24, 2021
206	Lianne La Havas	"Can't Fight"	April 7, 2021
207	Porter Robinson	"Get Your Wish"	April 21, 2021
208	Girl in Red	"Serotonin"	May 5, 2021
209	Imagine Dragons	"Follow You"	May 19, 2021
210	Arlo Parks	"Black Dog"	June 2, 2021
211	Sparks	"This Town Ain't Big Enough for Both of Us"	June 16, 2021
212	AURORA	"Runaway"	June 30, 2021
213	Fousheé	"Deep End"	July 14, 2021
214	Cheap Trick	"Surrender"	July 28, 2021
215	The Shins	"New Slang"	August 11, 2021
216	Lykke Li	"I Follow Rivers"	August 25, 2021
217	Mustafa	"Air Forces"	September 8, 2021
218	Lucy Dacus	"Thumbs"	September 22, 2021
219	John Lennon	"God"	October 6, 2021
220	Willow	"Transparent Soul" (feat. Travis Barker)	October 20, 2021
221	The War on Drugs	"I Don't Live Here Anymore" (feat. Lucius)	November 3, 2021
222	Hans Zimmer	"Dune"	November 17, 2021
223	Halsey	"You Asked For This"	December 1, 2021
224	Danny Elfman	"What's This?"	December 15, 2021
225	Joy Oladokun	"Look Up"	January 12, 2022
226	Franz Ferdinand	"Take Me Out"	January 26, 2022
227	Brandi Carlile	"You and Me on the Rock" (feat. Lucius)	February 9, 2022
228	Sarah Kinsley	"The King"	February 23, 2022
229	Steve Reich	"Different Trains: America, Before the War"	March 23, 2022
230	Peaches	"Boys Wanna Be Her"	April 6, 2022
231	Arooj Aftab	"Mohabbat"	May 4, 2022
232	Kevin Morby	"This Is A Photograph"	May 18, 2022
233	Rick Astley	"Never Gonna Give You Up"	June 1, 2022
234	Maren Morris	"Humble Quest"	June 15, 2022
235	Monica Martin	"Go Easy, Kid"	June 29, 2022
236	mxmtoon	"Mona Lisa"	July 13, 2022
237	Sudan Archives	"Selfish Soul"	July 27, 2022
238	Kae Tempest	"Move"	August 10, 2022
239	Madonna	"Hung Up"	August 24, 2022
240	Panic! At the Disco	"Viva Las Vengeance"	September 21, 2022
241	King Princess	"Let Us Die"	October 5, 2022
242	Santigold	"Ushers of the New World"	October 19, 2022
243	Iron & Wine	"Flightless Bird, American Mouth"	November 2, 2022
244	Omah Lay	"Never Forget"	November 16, 2022
245	Son Lux (feat. Mitski & David Byrne)	"This is a Life" (from Everything Everywhere All at Once)	December 7, 2022
246	Sampa the Great	"Let Me Be Great" (feat. Angélique Kidjo)	December 21, 2022
247	Noah Kahan	"Stick Season"	January 25, 2023
248	MUNA	"What I Want"	February 8, 2023
249	Kenny Beats	"Still"	March 8, 2023
250	Seal	"Kiss from a Rose"	March 22, 2023
251	Yaeji	"Passed Me By"	April 5, 2023
252	New Order	"Blue Monday"	May 3, 2023
253	Madison McFerrin	"Run"	May 17, 2023
254	Feist	"In Lightning"	May 31, 2023
255	Natalie Merchant	"Sister Tilly"	June 28, 2023
256	Bakar	"Hell n Back"	July 19, 2023
257	Local Natives	"Dark Days"	August 2, 2023
258	Siddhartha Khosla	"Only Murders in the Building"	August 16, 2023
259	Laufey	"From the Start"	September 20, 2023
260	Alvvays	"Archie, Marry Me"	October 4, 2023
261	Kesha	"Eat The Acid"	October 18, 2023
262	Paramore	"Liar"	November 1, 2023
263	Sampha	"Spirit 2.0"	November 15, 2023
264	RAYE	"Escapism"	December 6, 2023
265	Foo Fighters	"The Teacher"	December 20, 2023
266	The Postal Service	"The District Sleeps Alone Tonight" (Deluxe Anniversary Edition)	January 24, 2024
267	Green Day	"Basket Case"	February 7, 2024
268	Rhiannon Giddens	"You Louisiana Man"	March 6, 2024
269	Danny Brown	"Y.B.P. (feat. Bruiser Wolf)"	March 20, 2024
270	Shania Twain	"You're Still the One"	April 3, 2024
271	War	"Low Rider"	April 17, 2024
272	The Flaming Lips	"Do You Realize??"	May 15, 2024
273	Lizzy McAlpine	"Staying"	May 29, 2024
274	Crowded House	"Don't Dream It's Over"	June 12, 2024
275	Fenne Lily	"Lights Light Up"	July 10, 2024
276	Sam Smith	"Stay with Me"	July 24, 2024
277	Remi Wolf	"Soup"	August 21, 2024
278	Beabadoobee	"Coming Home"	September 4, 2024
279	Troye Sivan	"One of Your Girls"	September 18, 2024
280	Pharrell Williams	"Piece By Piece"	October 16, 2024
281	Crosby, Stills, Nash & Young	"Our House"	October 30, 2024
282	Le Tigre	"Deceptacon"	November 13, 2024
283	Gracie Abrams	"I Love You, I'm Sorry"	December 4, 2024
284	Sabrina Carpenter	"Please Please Please"	December 18, 2024
285	Adrianne Lenker	"Sadness as a Gift"	January 8, 2025
286	Yola	"Symphony"	January 22, 2025
Key–Change	Sophie Thatcher	"Waltz #1" by Elliott Smith	January 29, 2025
287	of Montreal	"Wraith Pinned to the Mist and Other Games"	February 5, 2025
288	Sasami	"In Love With A Memory (feat. Clairo)"	February 19, 2025
Key–Change	Hanif Abdurraqib	"Lost in the Supermarket" by The Clash	February 26, 2025
289	Theodore Shapiro	Severance (main title theme)	March 5, 2025
Key–Change	James Acaster	"Hey Ya!" by Outkast	March 26, 2025
290	MJ Lenderman	"You Don't Know the Shape I’m In"	April 2, 2025
Key–Change	Samin Nosrat	"Untouchable Face" by Ani DiFranco	April 16, 2025
291	Lizzo	"Still Bad"	April 23, 2025
292	Tears for Fears	"Everybody Wants to Rule the World"	May 7, 2025
Special	Jeff Tweedy	"How to Write One Song"	May 28, 2025
293	Anohni	"4 DEGREES"	June 11, 2025
Key–Change	Shirley Manson	"Drop Dead/Celebration" by Siouxsie and the Banshees	June 18, 2025
294	Little Simz	"Free"	June 25, 2025
295	Goo Goo Dolls	"Iris"	July 9, 2025
Key–Change	Jason Schwartzman	the ‘Rushmore’ soundtrack	July 16, 2025
296	Gigi Perez	"Sailor Song"	July 23, 2025
297	Fall Out Boy	"Sugar, We're Goin Down"	August 6, 2025
Key–Change	Jia Tolentino	"I Love You Always Forever"	August 27, 2025
298	Sam Fender	"People Watching"	September 3, 2025
299	Ethel Cain	"Nettles"	September 17, 2025
Key–Change	David Chang	"I See A Darkness" by Bonnie "Prince" Billy	September 24, 2025
300	Lady Gaga	"Abracadabra"	October 1, 2025
301	A-ha	"Take On Me"	October 15, 2025
302	Buckingham Nicks	"Frozen Love"	October 29, 2025
303	Clipse	"The Birds Don't Sing"	November 12, 2025
Key–Change	Demi Adejuyigbe	"You Only Live Once"	November 19, 2025
304	Jessie Reyez	"Goliath"	December 3, 2025
Key–Change	Rian Johnson	"Das Rheingold"	December 10, 2025
305	Air	"Playground Love"	December 17, 2025
306	Hit-Boy and Nipsey Hussle	"Racks in the Middle"	January 16, 2026
Key–Change	John Green	"You'll Never Walk Alone" by Gerry and the Pacemakers	January 21, 2026
307	Leon Thomas	"Mutt"	January 28, 2026
308	The Marías	"No One Noticed"	February 11, 2026
309	Silvana Estrada	"Como Un Pájaro"	February 25, 2026
310	Thompson Twins	"Hold Me Now"	March 11, 2026
Key–Change	Baz Luhrmann	"Time After Time" by Cyndi Lauper	March 18, 2026
311	Jack Harlow	"Say Hello"	March 25, 2026
312	Hurray for the Riff Raff	"Alibi"	April 8, 2026
313	The xx	"Crystalised"	May 6, 2026
Key–Change	Emma Straub	"69 Love Songs" by The Magnetic Fields	May 13, 2026
314	Hot Chip	"Boy from School"	May 20, 2026
