= Devra Hoff =

American bassist, composer and arranger

- Born: Colorado
- Occupations: Bassist; composer; arranger
- Member of: Sharon Van Etten & the Attachment Theory; Mendoza Hoff Revels
- Website: devrahoff.bandcamp.com

Devra Hoff is an American bassist, composer, and arranger. She is a member of Sharon Van Etten & the Attachment Theory and co-founder of Mendoza Hoff Revels with Ava Mendoza.

In addition to her work with Van Etten, Hoff is a key collaborator and bandmate of Julia Holter, having contributed to her studio albums, Loud City Song (2013), Have You in My Wilderness (2015), Aviary (2018) and Something in the Room She Moves (2024).

== Career ==
Hoff composed work for the Wholphin short film Look at the Sun, performed on the soundtrack for Anna Deavere Smith's Let Me Down Easy, and released three albums of solo and multi-tracked contrabass material: Solo Bass (2009), Baile as Baile (2019), and Sigils (2018). Laurie Anderson named Solo Bass as one of her top 5 favorite albums of all time. In 2021, Kill Rock Stars released Hoff's Voices From the Empty Moor (Songs of Anne Briggs), an album of works by English folk singer Anne Briggs; arranged and with bass performances by Hoff, the release features artists including Julia Holter, Shannon Lay, Sharon Van Etten, Emmett Kelly, and Jim White. Hoff's many other collaborators include Nels Cline, Cibo Matto, Kira Roessler, and Xiu Xiu, and she has released several albums with Ches Smith as Good for Cows.

== Selected discography ==
=== Solo ===
Year	Title	Label
2008	Solo Bass	
2018	Sigils	Stoned To Death
2019	Baile as Baile	Devil Hoof
2025	Solve, Coagula	Switch Hit

=== As leader and co-leader ===
Year	Artist	Title	Label	Personnel
2001	Good for Cows	Good for Cogs	Evander Music	Hoff, Smith
2003	Good for Cows	Less Than or Equal To	Free Porcupine Society	Hoff, Smith
2004	Redressers	To Each According...		Hoff, Smith, Marika Hughes, Carla Kihlstedt
2004	Good for Cows	Bebop Fantasy	Asian Man	Hoff, Smith
2008	Good for Cows	10th Anniversary Concert	Bleeding Ear	Hoff, Smith
2010	Good for Cows	Audumla	Web of Mimicry	Hoff, Smith
2018	AwkWard	In Progress		Hoff, Kira Roessler
2020	Caustics	Touch	Deathbomb Arc / Moone	Hoff, Yasi Perera, Josiah Wolf, John Dieterich
2021	Hoff	Voices From the Empty Moor	Kill Rock Stars	Hoff ft. Van Etten, Holter, Wiley, Lay, Farha, Kelly, White
2023	Mendoza Hoff Revels	Echolocation	AUM Fidelity	Hoff, Ava Mendoza, Smith, James Brandon Lewis

=== As sideperson ===
Year	Artist	Title	Label
2002	The Nels Cline Singers	Instrumentals	Cryptogramophone
2003	Carla Bozulich (ft. Willie Nelson)	The Red Headed Stranger	DiCristina Stair Builders
2004	The Nels Cline Singers	The Giant Pin	Cryptogramophone
2005	Xiu Xiu	La Forêt	5 Rue Christine
2006	Xiu Xiu	The Air Force	5 Rue Christine
2006	Nels Cline	New Monastery	Cryptogramophone
2006	Ben Goldberg Quintet	The Door, the Hat, the Chair, the Fact	Cryptogramophone
2006	Howard Wiley	Angola Project	
2006	Odessa Chen	Ballad of Paper Ships	
2007	The Nels Cline Singers	Draw Breath	Cryptogramophone
2007	Frith, Ochs, Johnston, Hoff, Smith	Reasons for Moving	Not Two
2007	Sean Hayes	Flowering Spade	
2008	Halvorson, Pavone, Smith, Hoff	Calling All Portraits	Skycap
2008	Steven Bernstein	Diaspora Suite	Tzadik
2009	Evangelista	The Prince of Truth	
2010	Nels Cline	Dirty Baby	Cryptogramophone
2010	ROVA + The Nels Cline Singers	The Celestial Septet	New World
2010	The Nels Cline Singers	Initiate	Cryptogramophone
2010	Sean Hayes	Run Wolves Run	
2011	Odessa Chen	The Archives	
2012	Xiu Xiu	Always	Polyvinyl
2013	Julia Holter	Loud City Song	Domino
2015	Julia Holter	Have You in My Wilderness	Domino
2016	Nels Cline	Lovers	Blue Note
2017	Deerhoof	Mountain Moves	Joyful Noise
2017	Tara Jane O'Neil	Tara Jane O'Neil	Gnomonsong
2017	Julia Holter	In the Same Room	Domino
2017	Xiu Xiu	Forget	Polyvinyl
2017	Shannon Lay	Living Water	Woodsist / Mare
2018	New Optimism	Amazon To LeFrak	Phantom Limb
2018	Miss Information	Sequence	Pioneer Works
2018	Julia Holter	Aviary	Domino
2018	Marc Ribot	Songs of Resistance	Anti-
2018	David Lord	Forest Standards	
2019	Xiu Xiu	Girl with Basket of Fruit	Polyvinyl
2019	Ether Feather	Devil Shadowless Hand	
2021	Shannon Lay	Geist	Sub Pop
2022	Sharon Van Etten	We've Been Going About This All Wrong	Jagjaguwar
2024	Julia Holter	Something in the Room She Moves	Domino
