= Something in the Room She Moves =

Studio album by Julia Holter
- Released: March 22, 2024
- Studios: 64 Sound, Los Angeles; 101 Recording, Los Angeles
- Genre: Art pop
- Length: 53:51
- Label: Domino
- Producers: Julia Holter; Kenny Gilmore

Julia Holter chronology
Behind the Wallpaper (with Spektral Quartet) (2023)	Something in the Room She Moves (2024)	Materia (2026)

Singles from Something in the Room She Moves
- 1. "Sun Girl" Released: November 7, 2023; 2. "Spinning" Released: January 9, 2024; 3. "Evening Mood" Released: February 28, 2024

Something in the Room She Moves is the sixth studio album by American musician Julia Holter, released on March 22, 2024, by Domino Recording Company. The album was inspired by Holter's newborn daughter, with Holter focused on capturing a childlike playfulness. Holter produced the album with Kenny Gilmore, wrote it with Devra Hoff and Chris Speed, and recorded with Hoff, Speed, Elizabeth Goodfellow, and Tashi Wada. It was preceded by three singles and was acclaimed by critics upon release.

== Background ==
Something in the Room She Moves is inspired in part by Holter's first daughter who was born during the COVID-19 pandemic, and from her experience of new motherhood. Between exhaustion and stress given the state of the world, Holter struggled at first to write, though she kept busy composing for the films Never Rarely Sometimes Always and Karen Dalton: In My Own Time. During the period, she was limited in reading, listening to music, and watching movies, struggling especially without books because she often relied on them for inspiration. She did note listening often to the Indian flautist T. R. Mahalingam and watching the animated film Ponyo with her daughter, the latter having inspired the liquid production style of "Evening Mood" and the theme of transformability in songs like "Spinning".

The album's title came to Holter spontaneously while she was naming a Logic Pro file for a demo track that eventually became the title track; it is a modification of the line "Something in the way she moves" from the Beatles song "Something", inspired by watching The Beatles: Get Back documentary. Though some have interpreted the change as a feminist subversion of the original lyric, or as a reference to Virginia Woolf's A Room of One's Own, Holter said neither were the case and that she hadn't thought that deeply about the name. The album is dedicated to Holter's 18-year-old nephew who died shortly after her daughter was born. Holter's grandparents also died around the same time; her grandfather's lap steel guitar was played on the album.

== Writing and recording ==
Holter usually prefers to record at home, and was going to record vocals before she contracted COVID-19 and lost her voice. Instead, she had to rent a studio and record vocals simultaneous with mixing the album. She also didn't have all the lyrics for the record written at that point, but found that the lyrics came to her during the recording, saying "All the words that I had been trying to come up with for two years suddenly came out."

"Sun Girl", an ambient pop song built on flute, fretless bass, and toy percussion, came from Holter's obsession with capturing the playful feeling of nursery rhymes. She struggled with and nearly gave up on the song, but eventually figured it out in a jam session with her band.

== Release and promotion ==
Prior to the album's announcement, Holter released the lead single "Sun Girl" on November 7, 2023. The song came with a music video directed by animator Tammy Nguyễn. Holter said the song's lyrics were about "being brought out of my comfort zone; into the unknown, playfulness and chaos", while The Line of Best Fit's Tyler Damara Kelly said they "evoke the spirit of a childlike game".

Holter announced the album on January 9, 2024, with release set for March 22 by Domino Recording Company. The announcement came with the release of the second single, "Spinning". Holter described the song as being about "being in the passionate state of making something: being in that moment, and what is that moment?" It came with a music video directed by Giraffe Studios. The album's third single, "Evening Mood", was released on February 28, with a music video directed by Dicky Bahto and featuring dancer Tatiana Luboviski-Acosta.

On November 12, 2024, Holter released "The Laugh Is in the Eyes", conceived during the Something in the Room She Moves sessions, as a stand-alone single. The song takes its title from a "Spinning" lyric.

=== Packaging ===
The cover art is taken from a painting called Wrestling by Holter's childhood friend, artist Christina Quarles. The artwork is ambiguous as to whether the two figures depicted are wrapped in a loving embrace, or fighting.

=== Live ===
Along with the album announcement, Holter shared tour dates for the US and Canada in May, with her live band consisting of Devra Hoff on fretless bass, Beth Goodfellow on drums, Tashi Wada playing synthesizer and bagpipes, and Kenny Gilmore working sound.

== Composition ==
Something in the Room She Moves is primarily an art pop album which features a range of genres, including avant-garde music, jazz-infused post-rock, classical, psychedelic folk, and electropop. The record includes field recordings and tape manipulation, with sound sources including a playground near Holter's home, a piccolo, and a phone thudding against a table.

== Critical reception ==
Something in the Room She Moves ratings
Aggregate scores
Source	Rating
AnyDecentMusic?	7.9/10
Metacritic	83/100
Review scores
Source	Rating
AllMusic	4/5 stars
The Arts Desk	4/5 stars
Beats Per Minute	82%
Exclaim!	8/10
The Line of Best Fit	8/10
Mojo	4/5 stars
MusicOMH	4.5/5 stars
Pitchfork	8.0/10
PopMatters	7/10
The Skinny	4/5 stars

According to the review aggregator Metacritic, Something in the Room She Moves received "universal acclaim" based on a weighted average score of 83 out of 100 from 16 critic scores. The reviews aggregated on AnyDecentMusic? collectively rated it a 7.9 out of 10, based on 17 critics' scores.

The Arts Desk's Mark Kidel called Something in the Room She Moves "perhaps the most adventurous of all [of Holter's albums]", saying it "inhabits a world where nothing is certain, narratives are disjointed, and the imagination of the listener is left to run free." Humo's Herbert Struyf said the album is "a serene record that is best played very loudly, so that you can hear and feel all the details and nuances, preferably with your eyes closed. The Skinny's Joe Creely called it "an album that worms its way into you, slowly revealing more and more of itself with each listen, layers of intricacies shifting beneath its drifting beauty."

MusicOMH's Steven Johnson called it "an absorbing, cohesive listen that casts fresh light on familiar structures and melds them into new and appealing shapes." Loud and Quiet's Theo Gorst said the album "streamlines the sprawl of 2018's Aviary and in so doing makes for a more accessible record. Exclaim!'s Tom Piekarski said the album "masterfully evokes a deeply grounding sense of peace, and feels carefully rooted in a commitment to a presence much more immediate than anything Holter has delivered before." Spill Magazine's Igor Bannikov wrote that Holter came "back to what we might call the middle-ground between her most successful pop attempts and constant thirst for Björk-inspired, Lucrecia Dalt-laden experiments", and that "she has cut off everything redundant and got an extremely solid, consistent, and well-crafted piece of art."

Stereogum called Something in the Room She Moves the 35th-best album of the first five months of 2024.

=== Year-end lists ===
Select year-end rankings for Something in the Room She Moves
Publication/critic	Accolade	Rank	Ref.
MOJO	75 Best Albums of 2024	68	
Uncut	80 Best Albums of 2024	12	

== Track listing ==
All tracks are written by Julia Holter with others noted.

Something in the Room She Moves track listing
No.	Title	Writer(s)	Length
1.	"Sun Girl"		5:53
2.	"These Morning"		3:49
3.	"Something in the Room She Moves"	Holter; Devra Hoff	6:18
4.	"Materia"		3:08
5.	"Meyou"		5:55
6.	"Spinning"	Holter; Hoff	6:14
7.	"Ocean"	Holter; Hoff; Chris Speed	5:38
8.	"Evening Mood"	Holter; Hoff	6:25
9.	"Talking to the Whisper"		6:52
10.	"Who Brings Me"		3:39
Total length:			53:51

== Personnel ==
=== Musicians ===
- Julia Holter – vocals, Wurlitzer electronic piano, Yamaha CS-60, lap steel guitar
- Elizabeth Goodfellow – drums, percussion
- Devra Hoff – fretless bass, double bass
- Chris Speed – saxophone, clarinet
- Tashi Wada – Prophet-6, bagpipes
- Sonjia Denise Hubert Harper – flute, piccolo
- Sarah Belle Reid – trumpet, electronics
- Ramona Gonzalez, Jessika Kenney, and Mia Doi Todd – vocals

=== Technical ===
- Julia Holter – producer, arranger, recording engineer
- Kenny Gilmore – co-producer, recording and mixing engineer
- Heba Kadry – mastering engineer
- Tyler Carmen and Gemma Castro – assistant recording engineers
- Christina Quarles – cover art
- Dicky Bahto – insert photo
- Matthew Cooper – design
- Recorded at 64 Sound and 101 Recording, Los Angeles

== Charts ==
Chart performance for Something in the Room She Moves
Chart (2024)	Peak position
Portuguese Albums (AFP)	119
Scottish Albums (Official Charts)	28
UK Album Downloads (Official Charts)	20
UK Independent Albums (Official Charts)	9
