= Cole M.G.N. =

American musician and record producer (born 1985)

- Also known as: Cole MGN
- Born: Cole Marsden Greif-Neill; March 7, 1985 (age 41)
- Origin: Los Angeles, California
- Occupations: Record producer; songwriter; mixer
- Label: Gloriette
- Publisher: Kobalt Music Group
- Member of: The Samps
- Formerly of: Ariel Pink's Haunted Graffiti
- Spouse: Ramona Gonzalez (m. 2006; div. 2018) Carly Rae Jepsen (m. 2025)

Cole Marsden Greif-Neill (born March 7, 1985), known professionally as Cole M.G.N., is an American musician, record producer, songwriter, and mixer. He is a former member of Ariel Pink's Haunted Graffiti. Cole has worked with Beck, Julia Holter, Christine and the Queens, DāM-FunK, Ariel Pink, Real Estate, The Vaccines, Thurston Moore, Snoop Dogg, NxWorries, Kossisko, Charlotte Gainsbourg, Blood Orange, and Nite Jewel. In 2016, Cole M.G.N. released his self-titled debut extended play. As of 2021, he has won six Grammy Awards for his work with Beck.

== Biography ==
He graduated from New York University's Tisch School of the Arts in 2007.

=== Career ===
He was a member of Ariel Pink's Haunted Graffiti before becoming Beck's engineer and his current work with Stones Throw. In recent years he has been involved in producing and mixing on records for the likes of Julia Holter, Ariel Pink's Haunted Graffiti and Snoop Dogg, and Dam-Funk's collaborative project, 7 Days Of Funk.

He won three Grammy Awards for his work on Beck's 2014 album Morning Phase, two Grammy Awards for his work on Beck's 2017 album Colors and one Grammy Award for his work on Beck's 2019 album Hyperspace.

Cole is published by Kobalt Music Group for the world.

== Personal life ==
In January 2006, he married Ramona Gonzalez of Nite Jewel. The couple split in 2018, after 12 years of marriage.

In November 2022, Canadian singer Carly Rae Jepsen announced that the two were in a relationship. On September 23, 2024, the two announced their engagement on her Instagram page. They married on October 4, 2025, at the Hotel Chelsea in New York City. On November 3, 2025, the couple announced that they were expecting their first child together. On March 17, 2026, Jepsen announced the birth of their son.

== Discography ==
=== EPs ===
- Cole M.G.N. (2016)

=== Singles ===
- "If U Let Me" (2016)

== Credits ==
=== Albums ===
Year	Artist	Title	Credits
2008	Nite Jewel	Good Evening	Instrumentation, producer, songwriter
2011	The Lonely Island	Turtleneck & Chain	Songwriter
2011	Thurston Moore	Demolished Thoughts	Engineer
2011	Stephen Malkmus and the Jicks	Mirror Traffic	Bonus engineer
2011	Charlotte Gainsbourg	Stage Whisper	Engineer, drum programming
2012	Nite Jewel	One Second of Love	Instrumentation, producer, songwriter
2012	Julia Holter	Ekstasis	Mixing, additional engineering
2012	Ariel Pink's Haunted Graffiti	Mature Themes	Instrumentation, additional production, additional engineering, mixing, editing, drum programming
2012	Dwight Yoakam	3 Pears	Instrumentation, recording, mixing
2012	Bat for Lashes	The Haunted Man	Additional engineering
2013	Julia Holter	Loud City Song	Producer, arranger, mixing
2013	7 Days of Funk	7 Days of Funk	Mixing
2014	Devonté Hynes	Palo Alto: Original Motion Picture Score	Mixing
2014	Ariel Pink	Pom Pom	Instrumentation, drum programming, Ableton, Logic
2014	Beck	Morning Phase	Engineer
2014	Jenny Lewis	The Voyager	Additional recording
2015	The Vaccines	English Graffiti	Songwriter, co-producer
2015	Julia Holter	Have You in My Wilderness	Producer, arranger, mixing
2016	Seth Bogart	Seth Bogart	Producer, songwriter, recording
2016	Nicholas Krgovich	The Hills	Mixing
2016	Nite Jewel	Liquid Cool	Co-producer, songwriter, assistant
2016	Inc. No World	As Light as Light	Producer, mixing, recording
2016	NxWorries	Yes Lawd!	Mixing
2017	Electric Guest	Plural	Instrumentation, producer, songwriter
2017	Real Estate	In Mind	Producer
2017	Nite Jewel	Real High	Producer, songwriter, mixing
2017	Laurel Halo	Dust	Mixing
2017	Washed Out	Mister Mellow	Additional production, mixing, recording
2017	Beck	Colors	Songwriter, co-producer, engineer
2018	The Vaccines	Combat Sports	Songwriter
2018	Christine and the Queens	Chris	Instrumentation, co-producer, vocal production
2018	Empress Of	Us	Songwriter, co-producer
2018	Julia Holter	Aviary	Executive producer
2019	DAWN	New Breed	Co-producer
2019	Kossisko	LOW	Producer
2019	!!!	Wallop	Co-producer
2019	Beck	Hyperspace	Instrumentation, songwriter, co-producer
2020	G-Eazy	Everything's Strange Here	Producer, songwriter, instrumentation
2020	Terror Jr	Rancho Catastrophe	Producer
2021	Your Grandparents	Thru My Window	Producer, songwriter
2021	The Vaccines	Back in Love City	Songwriter
2021	G-Eazy	These Things Happen Too	Producer, songwriter
2021	Mads Langer	Where Oceans Meet	Producer, songwriter
2022	Kossisko	World of Trouble	Producer, songwriter
2022	Paul Cherry	Back on the Music!	Producer, songwriter
2022	Wallows	Tell Me That It's Over	Songwriter
2022	The Regrettes	Further Joy	Producer, songwriter
2023	Carly Rae Jepsen	The Loveliest Time	Producer, songwriter
2024	Brooke Candy	Spiral	Producer, songwriter
2025	DeathbyRomy	Hollywood Forever	Producer, songwriter
2025	Carly Rae Jepsen	Emotion (10th Anniversary Edition)	Producer, songwriter
2026	Carly Rae Jepsen	Day and Night	Producer, songwriter

=== EPs ===
Year	Artist	Title	Credits
2009	Nite Jewel	Want You Back	Instrumentation, producer
2009	Ariel Pink's Haunted Graffiti	Reminiscences	Instrumentation
2010	The Samps	The Samps	Instrumentation, producer, songwriter
2010	Nite Jewel	Am I Real?	Instrumentation, songwriter, producer, arrangements, engineer, mixing, drum programming
2010	The Samps	The Samps	Instrumentation, producer, songwriter
2015	NxWorries	Link Up & Suede	Mixing
2016	Cole M.G.N.	Cole M.G.N.	Songwriter, producer, mixing
2016	Nite-Funk	Nite-Funk	Instrumentation, drum programming, mixing
2019	Terror Jr	Come Outside and Break Your Heart	Producer
2020	Wallows	Remote	Songwriter
2020	Upsahl	Young Life Crisis	Producer, songwriter
2022	Harper Finn	Newcomer	Producer, songwriter

=== Singles ===
Year	Artist	Title	Credits
2008	Haunted Graffiti	"Can't Hear My Eyes" / "Evolution's a Lie"	Instrumentation
2009	Nite Jewel	"Falling Far" / "Spiritual Nite Life"	Instrumentation, producer
2009	Nite Funk	"Am I Gonna Make It"	Instrumentation, producer
2010	Ariel Pink's Haunted Graffiti	"Round and Round" / "Mistaken Wedding"	Instrumentation, co-producer, songwriter
2011	Ariel Pink's Haunted Graffiti	"Fright Night"	Instrumentation, co-producer, songwriter
2011	Nite Jewel	"It Goes Through Your Head" / "Natural Causes"	Instrumentation, producer, songwriter
2011	The White Stripes	"The Hardest Button to Button" (Beck Remix)	Instrumentation, engineer, programming
2013	The Samps	"Plans" / "Twice High"	Instrumentation, producer, songwriter
2013	Beck	"I Won't Be Long"	Engineer, mixing
2013	Beck	"Gimme"	Instrumentation, additional engineering, mixing
2014	Julia Holter	"Don't Make Me Over" / "Hello Stranger"	Producer, arranger, mixing
2015	Nite-Funk	"Can U Read Me?"	Mixing
2020	Harper Finn	"Dance Away These Days"	Producer
2020	Kossisko	"World of Trouble"	Producer, songwriter
2020	Kossisko	"The End" (feat. G-Eazy)	Producer, songwriter
2020	DeathbyRomy	"Beautiful Mayhem"	Producer, songwriter
2021	G-Eazy	"Running Wild (Tumblr Girls 2) (feat. Kossisko)"	Instrumentation
2022	Grag Queen	"You Betta"	Producer, songwriter
2023	Brooke Candy	"FMUATW"	Producer, songwriter
2024	Erika Jayne	"Bounce"	Producer, songwriter
2025	Carly Rae Jepsen	"Guardian Angel"	Songwriter
2026	Carly Rae Jepsen	"Motivation"	Producer, songwriter
