= Have You in My Wilderness =

Studio album by Julia Holter
- Released: September 25, 2015
- Genre: Chamber pop
- Length: 46:00
- Label: Domino
- Producer: Cole M.G.N.; Julia Holter

Julia Holter chronology
Loud City Song (2013)	Have You in My Wilderness (2015)	In the Same Room (2017)

Singles from Have You in My Wilderness
- 1. "Feel You" Released: July 9, 2015; 2. "Sea Calls Me Home" Released: August 26, 2015

Have You in My Wilderness is the fourth studio album by American musician Julia Holter, released on September 25, 2015, by Domino Recording Company. Co-produced by Holter and Cole M.G.N., the album was preceded by the singles "Feel You" and "Sea Calls Me Home". Two further videos followed its release, for the tracks "Silhouette" and "Everytime Boots".

The album was released to widespread critical acclaim, placing highly on several music critics' end-of-year lists, and increased Holter's exposure significantly.

== Writing and composition ==
Unlike Holter's previous studio album, Loud City Song (2013), a concept album loosely inspired by the 1958 film, Gigi, Have You in My Wilderness is not linked by a unified narrative. Prior to the album's release, Holter noted: "It's more like Ekstasis than the last record. [...] For me it's easier to come up with this single story that ties everything together, so it was harder to do this record: to do something where I have to make up stories for every song."

Regarding the writing process for her lyrics, Holter noted, "I basically just write stream of consciousness to a certain extent, I let the song kind of go where it wants to go. I don't think that's a new idea, at all, but I think that maybe I do it to an extreme". Both "Sea Calls Me Home" and "Betsy on the Roof" were written years prior to recording and often performed during Holter's live performances. "Lucette Stranded on the Island" was influenced by Colette's novella, Chance Acquaintances, while novelist Christopher Isherwood's recurring fictional character, Sally Bowles, was an influence in writing "How Long?".

Holter cites Scott Walker's song, "Duchess", as a key influence on the album, noting: "Somehow that song captures what I was trying to do on a larger level: this warm, golden group of love songs. That was what I had in mind, [but] in the end I don't think it comes across."

== Recording ==
The recording process for Have You in My Wilderness took much longer than initially expected: "It took a really long time. We had to record many times. It was frustrating. The last one was so easy to make, in a way, and this record was this troubled child. It was so hard." Holter credits producer Cole M.G.N. with foregrounding her vocals on the album, noting "[He] really pushed me to let the vocals be in the forefront. He pushed me to really bring out the vocals because I tend to not do that. I usually like to hide my vocals behind the music".

Holter recorded the album with the idea of expanding upon her sound: "All of my projects are very different, in my mind, but this one's working in a tradition of 60s ballads. I really wanted to have this big sound, although it doesn't mean I'm going to make music that sounds like that again."

== Promotion ==
The album's first single, "Feel You", was released on July 9, 2015, as well an accompanying music video. The album's second single, "Sea Calls Me Home", was released on August 26, 2015. The music video for the song, "Silhouette", was released on November 18, 2015, while the music video for "Everytime Boots", was released on February 11, 2016.

== Critical reception ==
Have You in My Wilderness ratings
Aggregate scores
Source	Rating
AnyDecentMusic?	8.5/10
Metacritic	87/100
Review scores
Source	Rating
AllMusic	5/5 stars
The Daily Telegraph	5/5 stars
The Guardian	5/5 stars
The Independent	3/5 stars
Mojo	5/5 stars
NME	4/5
Pitchfork	8.4/10
Q	4/5 stars
Rolling Stone	3.5/5 stars
Uncut	9/10

Have You in My Wilderness was met with widespread critical acclaim. At Metacritic, which assigns a normalized rating out of 100 to reviews from professional publications, the album received an average score of 87, based on 28 reviews. Aggregator AnyDecentMusic? gave it 8.5 out of 10, based on their assessment of the critical consensus.

Heather Phares of AllMusic said, "While it's tempting to say Have You in My Wilderness is her most personal music yet, it might be more accurate to say that it's her most approachable: this time, her brilliance demands a lot from her listeners, but also meets them more than halfway". Adam Kivel of Consequence said, "She doesn't convey specific messages or exhaustively detail narratives, but to listen to each song on Have You in My Wilderness is to inhabit a feeling in all of its pain and all of its glory". Cam Lindsay of Exclaim! said, "Have You in My Wilderness finds Holter narrowing her focus a little. In doing so, she gets the best of both worlds, showing off her ability to write warm and breezy pop music while maintaining the complexity, and perplexity, that made her so intriguing to begin with". Alexis Petridis of The Guardian said, "The result is a genuinely exceptional and entrancing album, opaque but effective, filled with beautiful, skewed songs, unconventional without ever feeling precious or affected". Rob Mesure of MusicOMH said, "This may well be Holter's most accessible album to date, but it's this very approachability that renders it all the more intriguing, drawing you in with open arms. Stately and serene, it's a wilderness that begs to be inhabited for some time, a country you'll be reluctant to leave". Mojo stated, "This is not a record that wants or needs to be solved, but the clues and traces it leaves behind are so compelling it's difficult to let it alone". NME stated, "An intense, emotional record".

Winston Cook-Wilson of Pitchfork said, "Have You in My Wilderness embraces the specific, rather than the eternal, and in her narrowed focus you can sense a palpable self-confidence and a hard-won precision". Q stated, "An album that repeatedly pulls you back in to try and decipher its charms". Will Hermes of Rolling Stone said, "All the world's indeed a stage on this enchanting fifth LP". Uncut stated, "With Have You in My Wilderness her songs feel brighter, more pop, yet they're also just as lush, as considered and as quietly experimental". Andy Gill of The Independent said, "There's prodigious ambition here, and moments of great pleasure".

=== Year-end lists ===
Select year-end rankings of Have You in My Wilderness
Publication	List	Rank	Ref.
Drowned in Sound	Favourite Albums of the Year 2015	55	
The Guardian	The Best Albums of 2015	4	
Mojo	Top 50 Albums of 2015	1	
Pitchfork	The 50 Best Albums of 2015	18	
Pitchfork	Readers' Poll Results 2015	13	
Q	Top 50 Albums of 2015	2	
Stereogum	The 50 Best Albums of 2015	50	
Uncut	Top 75 Albums of 2015	1	
The Wire	Releases of the Year 1–50	4	

== Track listing ==
All tracks are written by Julia Holter.

Have You in My Wilderness track listing
No.	Title	Length
1.	"Feel You"	4:08
2.	"Silhouette"	3:53
3.	"How Long?"	3:58
4.	"Lucette Stranded on the Island"	6:46
5.	"Sea Calls Me Home"	3:07
6.	"Night Song"	4:12
7.	"Everytime Boots"	3:28
8.	"Betsy on the Roof"	6:15
9.	"Vasquez"	6:37
10.	"Have You in My Wilderness"	3:36
Total length:		46:00

== Personnel ==
Musicians

- Corey Fogel – percussion
- Kenny Gilmore – percussion
- Devra Hoff – bass
- Julia Holter – vocals, keyboards
- Danny Meyer – saxophone, clarinet
- Chris Speed – saxophone
- Andrew Tholl – violin
- Christopher Votek – cello

Production and design

- Julia Holter – production
- Cole M.G.N. – production, engineering, mixing
- David Ives – mastering
- Darrell Thorp – engineering
- Bill Mims – assistant engineering
- Jake Viator – assistant engineering
- Rick Bahto – photography
- Matthew Cooper – design

== Charts ==
Chart performance for Have You in My Wilderness
Chart (2015)	Peak position
Belgian Albums (Ultratop Flanders)	56
Belgian Albums (Ultratop Wallonia)	107
Dutch Albums (Album Top 100)	36
German Albums (Offizielle Top 100)	100
Irish Albums (IRMA)	43
Portuguese Albums (AFP)	25
Spanish Albums (PROMUSICAE)	95
UK Albums (OCC)	29
US Heatseekers Albums (Billboard)	3
US Top Rock Albums (Billboard)	40

== Release history ==
Release formats for Have You in My Wilderness
Region	Date	Label	Format(s)	Ref.
Various	September 25, 2015	Domino	CD; digital download; streaming; vinyl	
