= Materia (Julia Holter album) =

Studio album by Julia Holter
- Released: August 21, 2026
- Studios: Julia Holter's home studio; 64 Sound
- Length: 34:44
- Label: Domino
- Producer: Julia Holter

Julia Holter chronology
Something in the Room She Moves (2024)	Materia (2026)

Singles from Materia
- 1. "The Laugh Is in the Eyes" Released: November 12, 2024; 2. "Fantasy" Released: June 23, 2026; 3. "My Lost One" Released: July 30, 2026; 4. "Materia 2" Released: August 18, 2026

Materia is the seventh studio album by the American musician Julia Holter, released on August 21, 2026, by Domino Recording Company. It is a companion to Holter's 2024 album Something in the Room She Moves, featuring new songs, previously unreleased material, and two reworkings of its title track.

== Background and singles ==
Announced on June 23, 2026, Materia was described as a "companion LP" to Holter's previous album, Something in the Room She Moves (2024). It includes four new songs written and recorded with her band while touring, as well as reinventions of songs from the album that were conceived during its early stages of production. Materia is centered on the title track from her 2024 album, including two additional versions, "Materia 2" and "Materia 3". The former was released as a single on August 18, 2026.

Alongside the album announcement, Holter released the lead single "Fantasy", which took over a year to complete and "went through various transformations". "The Laugh Is in the Eyes" was previously released as a standalone single on November 12, 2024, several months after the release of Holter's previous album. "My Lost One" was released on July 30, 2026, and was described by Holter as being "inspired by children's books with creepy rhymes and nonsense syllables".

== Critical reception ==
Materia ratings
Aggregate scores
Source	Rating
Any Decent Music	7.4/10
Metacritic	81/100
Review scores
Source	Rating
AllMusic	4/5 stars
Mojo	4/5 stars
MusicOMH	3.5/5 stars
Paste	8.3/10
The Skinny	4/5 stars
Slant Magazine	3.5/5 stars
Uncut	4/5 stars

Any Decent Music gave the album a weighted average score of 7.4 out of 10 from twelve critic scores. According to Metacritic, it received "universal acclaim" based on a weighted average score of 81 out of 100 from nine critic scores.

Ryan Reed of Paste rated the album 8.3 out of 10, describing it as a "deliberate companion and pseudo-sequel" and a "postscript" to Holter's 2024 album Something in the Room She Moves, citing its continuity with that album and its brief runtime. However, Reed argued that "it has gravity of its own", calling it a "substantial, beautifully strange work". In another positive review, Patrick Gamble at The Skinny argued that Holter's songs are never truly finished, but that she continues "tending to" them, likening the process to "a song passed down through generations". Gamble praised this approach and considered the inclusion of multiple versions of a song on the album effective.

In a slightly more critical review for Slant Magazine, Paul Attard wrote that the album "never reaches the emotional peaks" of its predecessor, making it less "immersive and immediate", but said it "works best as an appendix". Attard concluded that Holter had understood the idea that "the margins can contain plenty worth returning to". Giving the album the same score, Chris White at MusicOMH wrote that although it "understandably lacks the expansiveness and cohesion" of Holter's previous work, it is "nevertheless well worth exploring".

== Track listing ==
All lyrics are written by Julia Holter.

Materia track listing
No.	Title	Music	Length
1.	"The Laugh Is in the Eyes"	Julia Holter; Devra Hoff; Chris Speed	4:38
2.	"My Lost One"	Holter; Speed	5:16
3.	"Fantasy"	Holter; Speed	3:54
4.	"Materia 2"	Holter; Hoff; Speed	4:48
5.	"Clepsydra"	Holter	2:18
6.	"My Twin"	Holter	10:16
7.	"Materia 3"	Holter	3:34
Total length:			34:44

== Personnel ==
Credits are adapted from the album's liner notes.

- Julia Holter – voice, arrangements, production, additional engineering (all tracks); Nord Stage (tracks 1–4), Yamaha CS-60 (1, 2, 4), MIDI CS-80 (1, 3), Ace Tone (3, 4, 6), Mellotron (3, 5), MIDI music box (3, 6); Fender Rhodes, Moog Opus 3 (3); MIDI Prophet-6 (6), Wurlitzer (7)
- Kenny Gilmore – co-production, engineering, mixing
- Tyler Karmen – engineering assistance
- Heba Kadry – mastering
- Jacob Clements – mastering assistance
- Devra Hoff – fretless bass (1–4)
- Chris Speed – clarinet (1, 4), saxophone (2, 3)
- Tashi Wada – Prophet-6, Oberheim OB-X8 (1, 2); tape machine engineering (6, 7), art direction
- Elizabeth Goodfellow – drums, percussion (1, 2)
- Maia – flute (2)
- Jessika Kenney – voice (4)
- Chantal Anderson – cover photography
- Matthew Cooper – design

== Charts ==
Chart performance for Materia
Chart (2026)	Peak position
UK Albums Sales (Official Charts)	84
UK Independent Albums (Official Charts)	26
