= Alex Temple =

American composer and professor

Alex Temple is a contemporary classical music composer and professor of music composition. Her pieces draw from multiple styles of both classical and popular music.

== Compositions ==
Behind the Wallpaper is a narrative song cycle, with music and lyrics by Temple. In 2023, the Spektral Quartet released a recording featuring singer Julia Holter. According to Spin Magazine, the narrative was inspired by Temple's gender transition as a trans woman, using surreal, dreamlike imagery to explore feelings of otherness. The Wall Street Journal compared elements of the piece to Beethoven's “Pastorale” Symphony and David Ackles's American Gothic, with chromatic melodies and various contemporary techniques. The poems use a second-person ("you") perspective. Behind the Wallpaper contains cinematic elements reminiscent of horror films. The New York Times described the horror elements of a 2015 performance of the song cycle as "surreal transformations and spooky situations: a character who has been swallowing seawater and live fish, another wandering a house where the walls keep shifting."

In 2018, Temple's piece Three Principles of Noir premiered at Carnegie Hall alongside composer Valerie Coleman's Phenomenal Women as part of a showcase of composers under the age of forty. Three Principles of Noir features a time-travel narrative.

Temple's piece Liebeslied was performed by the Detroit Symphony Orchestra. It includes surreal variations of 1940s–1950s love songs.

== Academia ==
Temple is a professor of music composition at Arizona State University. She has a Doctorate of Musical Arts (DMA) from Northwestern University.
