= In the Same Room =

Album by Julia Holter

Live album by Julia Holter
- Released: March 31, 2017
- Recorded: August 23–24, 2016
- Venues: RAK Studios, London
- Length: 59:22
- Label: Domino Documents

Julia Holter chronology
Have You in My Wilderness (2015)	In the Same Room (2017)	Aviary (2018)

Professional ratings
Aggregate scores
Source	Rating
AnyDecentMusic?	7.4/10
Metacritic	76/100
Review scores
Source	Rating
Contactmusic.com	4/5 stars
Cutting Edge	4/5 stars
Le Devoir	3.5/5 stars
Gaffa Denmark	4/6
Gaffa Sweden	4/6
Gazeta Wyborcza	3/5 stars
HHV-Magazin	8/10
Laut.de	4/5 stars
Mondosonoro	6/10
Musikexpress	5.5/6
Soundi	4/5 stars
The Straits Times	4/5 stars

In the Same Room is a live studio album by American musician Julia Holter, released on March 31, 2017, on Domino Documents. Recorded with her backing band over two days at London's RAK Studios, the album was recorded during the tour for Holter's fourth studio album, Have You in My Wilderness (2015).

The album is the first release of Domino Recording Company's live imprint, Domino Documents.

== Track listing ==
No.	Title	Original release	Length
1.	"Horns Surrounding Me" (live)	Loud City Song	4:36
2.	"So Lillies" (live)	Tragedy	4:11
3.	"Silhouette" (live)	Have You in My Wilderness	4:57
4.	"How Long?" (live)	Have You in My Wilderness	4:02
5.	"Feel You" (live)	Have You in My Wilderness	4:05
6.	"Lucette Stranded on the Island" (live)	Have You in My Wilderness	7:06
7.	"In the Green Wild" (live)	Loud City Song	4:04
8.	"City Appearing" (live)	Loud City Song	7:41
9.	"Vasquez" (live)	Have You in My Wilderness	8:40
10.	"Betsy on the Roof" (live)	Have You in My Wilderness	6:34
11.	"Sea Calls Me Home" (live)	Have You in My Wilderness	3:26

== Charts ==
Chart (2017)	Peak position
Belgian Albums (Ultratop Flanders)	126
