= Big Black Hole and the Little Baby Star =

Sean Hayes
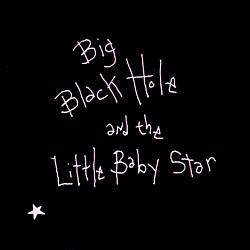

Studio album by Sean Hayes
- Released: January 24, 2006
- Genre: Folk, pop
- Length: 53:55

Sean Hayes chronology
Alabama Chicken (2003)	Sean Hayes (2006)	Flowering Spade (2007)

Big Black Hole and the Little Baby Star is the fourth album by American folk musician Sean Hayes. It was released on January 24, 2006.

== Track listing ==
1. "Boom Boom Goes the Day"
2. "Feel Good"
3. "3 a.m."
4. "Politics"
5. "Same God"
6. "Pollinating Toes"
7. "Angel"
8. "All Things"
9. "Big Black Hole & the Little Baby Star"
10. "Rosebush Inside"
11. "Fucked Me Right Up"
12. "Calling All Cars"
13. "33 Fool"
14. "Turnaroundturnmeon"
