= Moreese Bickham =

American anti-death penalty activist (1917–2016)

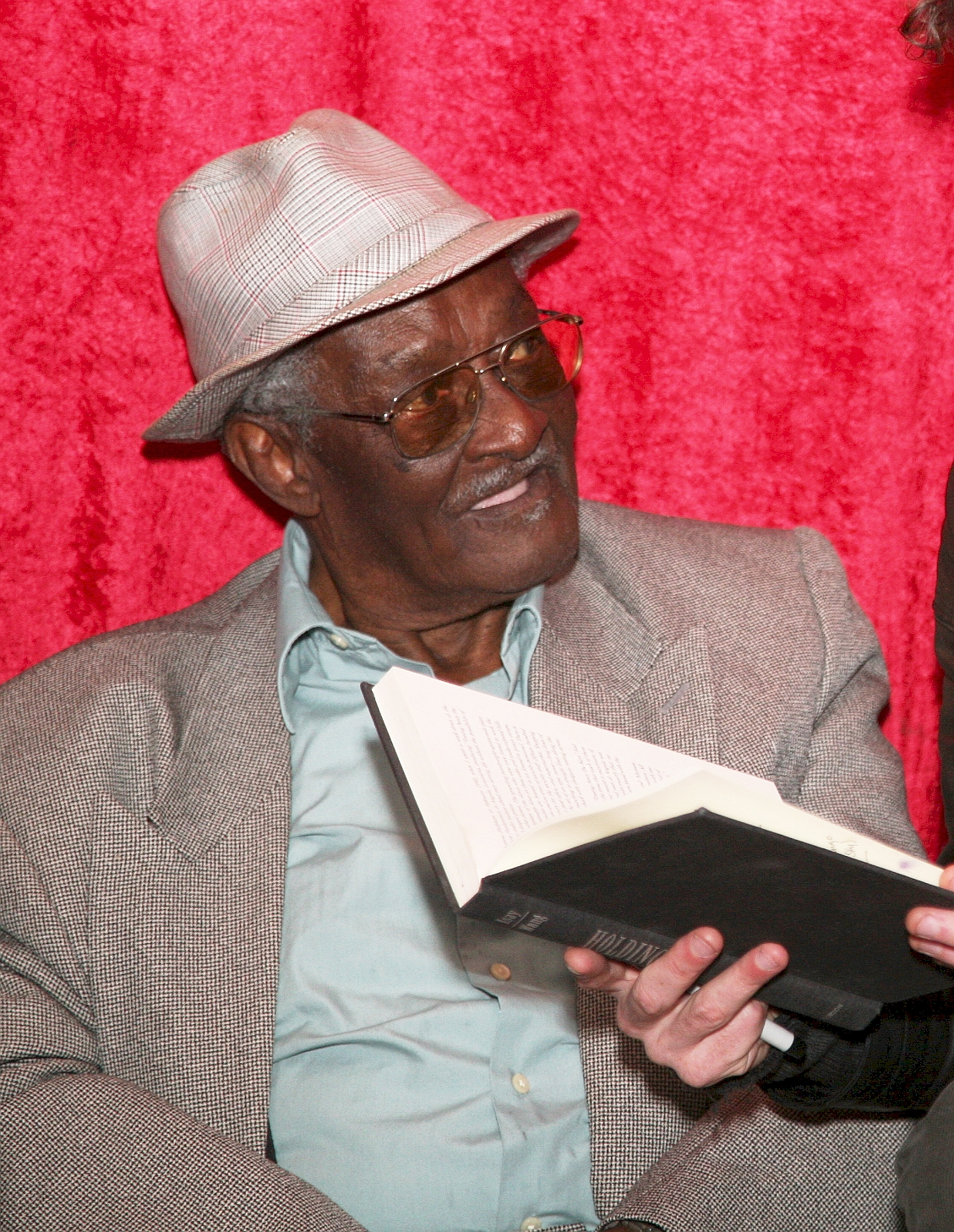
- Born: June 6, 1917; Tylertown, Mississippi, U.S.
- Died: April 2, 2016 (aged 98); Alameda, California, U.S.
- Occupations: Employee of the City of Mandeville, LA
- Motive: Self-defense (claimed)
- Conviction: First degree murder
- Penalty: Death; commuted to life imprisonment; further commuted to 75 years imprisonment

Details
- Victims: Gus Gill, 68; Jake Galloway, 74
- Date: July 12, 1958
- Country: United States
- Location: Mandeville, Louisiana

Moreese Bickham (June 6, 1917 – April 2, 2016) was an American resident of Mandeville, Louisiana who was arrested, convicted, and sentenced to death for the July 12, 1958, killings of two sheriff's deputies, who were allegedly members of the Ku Klux Klan. In 1972, Bickham's death sentence was converted to life without the possibility of parole, after the U.S. Supreme Court's decision in Furman v. Georgia. In April 1995, after New York attorney Michael Alcamo challenged Bickham's 1958 conviction, Louisiana Governor Edwin Edwards commuted Bickham's sentence to 75 years. Several months later, Alcamo won a full release, and Bickham left Angola State Penitentiary in January 1996, a free man after 37 1/2 years in prison. Bickham lived the rest of his life in California, and in April 2016, died in hospice care in Alameda, California after a short illness, at the age of 98.

== Legal history ==
=== Trial and death sentence ===
Born in 1917, the grandson of enslaved Africans, Bickham lived most of his life in Mississippi and Louisiana. He served in the United States Navy in World War II, stationed at Pearl Harbor.

In 1958, Bickham, 41, lived in Mandeville, Louisiana, a town north of New Orleans. According to trial transcripts, at around 11 pm on the evening of July 12, 1958, Bickham became drawn into an argument with two sheriff's deputies in a bar called "Buck's Place" in Mandeville. The police claimed that Bickham's girlfriend, Florence Spencer, had been "acting unruly." At approximately 11 pm the two deputies—Gus Gill, 68, and Jake Galloway, 74—drove Spencer home. The deputies wore street clothes, and many in the community reported that they believed the two deputies were associated with the Ku Klux Klan.

Later that night, at approximately 2 am, Gill and Galloway arrived at Bickham's home on Villerey Street in Mandeville. The deputies approached Bickham's front door, and fired at Bickham, striking him in the stomach. Bickham returned fire with a shotgun, killing both officers. Bickham was arrested several hours later at Baton Rouge Hospital. Prosecutors had argued that he "lay in wait" at his home for the deputies to arrive, and then murdered them in cold blood. An all-white jury convicted Bickham of one count of first degree murder and sentenced him to death by electrocution. Bickham maintained that Gill had called him the n-word and threatened to kill him. Spencer testified that the officer had earlier told Bickham, "I will take care of you later on."

For fourteen years, Bickham avoided execution, winning seven stays of execution. He lived on death row in the Angola State Penitentiary, in solitary confinement 23 hours per day.

=== Commutation to life without parole after Furman v. Georgia ===
In 1972, after the U.S. Supreme Court determined that death sentences applied in certain ways were unconstitutional, all death sentences nationwide were overturned. As such, Bickham's sentence was reduced to life without parole. He was released into the general prison population in Angola. Through the 1970s and 1980s, Bickham worked in a variety of capacities at Angola. He assisted in the visitors' center, maintained a garden in the prison cemetery, learned leather-making, and he became ordained as a minister in the Methodist faith. In 1989, independent radio documentarian David Isay interviewed Bickham for a documentary on long-timers at Angola, entitled "Tossing Away the Keys". Bickham was freed in January 1996 through the efforts of New York City attorney Michael Alcamo.

=== Negotiations, sentence reduction and release ===
In August 1994, New York corporate lawyer Michael Alcamo accepted Bickham's case pro bono. Working with 35-year-old trial transcripts and newspaper clippings, Alcamo investigated the circumstances of the conviction. He began to present the case to Louisiana authorities that Bickham had been wrongfully convicted.

Alcamo pointed out that the deputies contradicted themselves in their own testimony. If Bickham had been violent or dangerous at 11 p.m., at Buck's Place, the two deputies would have arrested Bickham at that time. Instead, the deputies arrested Florence Spencer, Bickham's companion, and then drove her home. Alcamo presented the conclusion that there was no reasonable basis for Galloway and Gill to have gone to Bickham's home later, at 2:10 am, and that they had no grounds to arrest him. Alcamo said that it could be further inferred that the two men meant to harm Bickham. Alcamo argued that Bickham had either acted in self-defense or, at worst, was guilty of manslaughter, which would've carried a maximum sentence of 21 years on each count. With reductions for good behavior, this meant that Bickham should've served no more than 21 years in prison for killing the two deputies.

As a secondary position, Alcamo sought a commutation of Bickham's sentence from life without parole to 75 years. Because local sentiment made a full pardon out of the question, Alcamo took the position that Bickham's sentence should be commuted, or reduced, to a specific term of 75 years. If this were successful, it could then be possible to seek a parole date or a specific release date based on Louisiana's "good time statute", (RS 15:571.3.1). This law allowed a sentence to be reduced by one day for each day served on good behavior.

As part of the legal strategy, Alcamo organized a national letter-writing campaign. Through 1994, working from a corporate law office in Manhattan, Alcamo focused public attention on the case, arranging radio interviews on public radio stations in New York City and Chicago. Twice, Alcamo arranged for Bickham to join a conference call on live radio, on WBEZ in Chicago, and speak with the program host, Gary Covino, and with Bickham's own family members—the first contact he had had with them in decades. Finally, in January 1995, Louisiana Governor Edwin Edwards granted the request for a sentence reduction to 75 years.

Alcamo then immediately requested a hearing for a release on parole, for which an inmate is eligible after having served a third of his sentence. However, despite the passage of 37 years, the parole hearing drew massive news coverage and local protests. In April 1995, after a highly contentious hearing at the Louisiana State Parole Board, Bickham's request for parole was denied.

Alcamo then negotiated with the prison warden, Burl Cain, to obtain and review Bickham's prison record. Alcamo argued that Bickham's prison record was sufficiently exemplary that under the State of Louisiana's "Good Time Statute", Bickham could be eligible for a sentence reduction of one day for each day served with good behavior.

After a review of the prison record, the Angola warden agreed to certify as to Bickham's good behavior during his 37 years of incarceration. Alcamo then petitioned the State under the good-time statute, that Bickham should be releasable as a free man after serving a term of 37.5 years. Alcamo argued that once the State Penitentiary staff had certified Bickham's prison record, the inmate's release would be non-discretionary.

The Louisiana Department of Corrections agreed with this analysis. At 12:01 am on January 10, 1996, Alcamo was accompanied by journalist David Isay, and escorted Bickham from the prison. Bickham was thus a free man, not subject to parole.

Fulfilling a promise he had made on Bickham's behalf to the State of Louisiana, Alcamo then drove with Isay and Bickham through the night across the state; then out of Louisiana into Mississippi. The next day, Alcamo and Isay escorted Bickham to Louis Armstrong New Orleans International Airport, and Bickham flew to Oakland, California to join his family.

=== Influence ===
At the time of his death Bickham resided in California and was an active participant in the movement to abolish capital punishment in the United States. David Isay is the creator of StoryCorps, a national enterprise to record oral histories. Michael Alcamo works in finance.

In 2001, Edwin Edwards, the man who commuted Bickham's sentence, was convicted of racketeering and sentenced to ten years in federal prison. In 2010, Bickham wrote to President Barack Obama to ask the President to release Edwards a year early, but the request was not granted.

In 2006 he was the subject of a chapter entitled "'Pops' the Oldest Member of the Class" in Back from the Dead, One woman's Search for the men who walked off America's Death Row.

Burl Cain, the Angola prison warden, resigned from his post in 2015 after pressure arose over his business dealings with relatives of inmates. Over a period of several years, Cain had entered into business partnerships with two men who had close ties with state inmates. Cain was trying to develop a subdivision in West Feliciana Parish, about 30 miles from Angola. He transacted with two businessmen, one the stepfather of a double-murderer and the other a friend of a killer who helped underwrite the convict's appeals.

Bickham is the subject of two contemporary songs: "Half a Life Away," by Stiff Little Fingers, a moving ballad that misstates certain facts of Bickham's case and "Rosebush Inside" by Sean Hayes.

Bickham's case has been chronicled in numerous national media, including The New York Times, New York Daily News and Seattle Times.

Bickham's story was also featured on NPR's Snap Judgment with Glen Washington in show 329 entitled "Found." In the radio feature, as a follow-up to his profile in StoryCorps, and the retelling of his story by Sean Hayes in his song "Rosebush Inside", Hayes tells of meeting Bickham and his family in person at a live performance.

Bickham was quoted by Harvard Prof. Dan Gilbert as saying upon release "I don't have one minute's regret. It was a glorious experience." Bearing in mind that Bickham spent fourteen years in solitary confinement, Gilbert has cited Bickham's quote as evidence that happiness is achievable in any condition. Prof. Gilbert acknowledged that he had erroneously stated that Bickham had been exonerated "through DNA evidence," when, in fact DNA was not involved in any aspect of the effort to free Bickham.

In 2017 Bickham was the subject of a 11 minute film, "Seven Dates with Death" executive produced by Joan M. Cheever and directed by Mike Holland which had its world premier at the 2017 Santa Barbara International Film Festival
