= Flowering Spade =

Sean Hayes

Studio album by Sean Hayes
- Released: 2007
- Genres: Folk, pop
- Length: 48:50

Sean Hayes chronology
Big Black Hole and the Little Baby Star (2006)	Sean Hayes (2007)	Run Wolves Run (2010)

Flowering Spade is the fifth album by Sean Hayes. It was released in 2007.

Flowering Spade is Hayes' first album recorded in a studio. Hayes authored all thirteen songs. Ches Smith, Shahzad Ismaily, Devra Hoff, Todd Roper, Ara Anderson, Rob Reich, and David Boyce from the avant-garde jazz and post-rock scenes of New York City, Los Angeles and San Francisco, performed on the album.

== Track listing ==
1. "All For Love"
2. "Midnight Rounders"
3. "Time"
4. "Hip Kids"
5. "Dolores Guerrero"
6. "Cool Hand"
7. "Baby I Do"
8. "Onion"
9. "Penniless Patron"
10. "Sally Ann"
11. "Sufidrop"
12. "Elizabeth Sways"
13. "Flowering Spade"
