= Alabama Chicken =

Sean Hayes

Studio album by Sean Hayes
- Released: September 8, 2003
- Genre: Folk, pop
- Length: 49:07

Sean Hayes chronology
Lunar Lust (2002)	Sean Hayes (2003)	Big Black Hole and the Little Baby Star (2006)

Alabama Chicken is the third album by American folk musician Sean Hayes. It was released on September 8, 2003.

== Track listing ==
1. "Moonrise"
2. "Little Maggie"
3. "Here We Are..."
4. "Alabama Chicken"
5. "Walkin' Down the Line"
6. "Smoking Signals"
7. "Balancing Act in Blue"
8. "Two Big Eyes"
9. "Everyday Hamlet"
10. "Diamond in the Sun"
11. "The Rain Coming Down"
12. "Rattlesnake Charm (Dream Machine)"
