= Aviary (album) =

Studio album by Julia Holter
- Released: October 26, 2018
- Studio: Band House (Los Angeles); Julia Holter's Studio (Los Angeles)
- Length: 89:48
- Label: Domino
- Producer: Julia Holter; Kenny Gilmore

Julia Holter chronology
In the Same Room (2017)	Aviary (2018)	Behind the Wallpaper (with Spektral Quartet) (2023)

Singles from Aviary
- 1. "I Shall Love 2" Released: September 6, 2018; 2. "Words I Heard" Released: October 17, 2018

Aviary is the fifth studio album by American musician Julia Holter, released on October 26, 2018, by Domino. It was preceded by the singles "I Shall Love 2" and "Words I Heard". The album title is derived from a line in poet Etel Adnan's 2009 collection Master of the Eclipse.

== Writing and composition ==
Holter has said that concepts regarding "memory" were a key influence during the writing of Aviary. In an interview with DIY she revealed that "Memory was a theme that kept coming up. Memories that emerge in the mind that get in the way of your own thoughts. I started noticing there was wings imagery, birds". She has mentioned that these themes were mainly influenced by Etel Adnan's Master of the Eclipse and Mary Carruthers' The Book of Memory. Talking about both works in an interview with Pitchfork, Holter stated that "I was reading Mary Carruthers' The Book of Memory, about how memory functioned in the Middle Ages. Memory is something I'm deeply interested in. The Etel Adnan book talks about how memories stalk you, and that really resonated with me:.. 'I found myself in an aviary full of shrieking birds'. What I've realized is that there are these connections in my mind between extremes: beautiful sounds of birds, shrieking sounds of birds, beautiful memories, terrible memories... And that's where Aviary all made sense to me: These birds that are like memories flying around, everything kind of happening at once".

Holter has also named jazz musician Alice Coltrane and her fifth album Universal Consciousness as an influence. While composing songs such as "Words I Heard", Holter has stated that she, "improvised some melodies to fly around the song, and then transcribed that for violin into 4 parts [...] each in similar ranges, doing similar things but at different times, kind of diving into that 'hocketing' effect I was into throughout the record. That exciting combination of synth and strings in Coltrane's music feels hopeful in a way, the beauty feels infinite or something, and I was inspired by it".

== Release and promotion ==
Holter announced the release of Aviary on September 6, 2018, alongside the release of the lead single "I Shall Love 2", accompanied by a radio edit and a music video directed by Dicky Bahto, who also designed the album cover. On October 17, she released a second single, "Words I Heard", also accompanied by a radio edit and a music video directed by Bahto. The video was inspired by an essay by Etel Adnan, who also inspired the album title. The album was released on October 26 through Domino Recording Company digitally and on a double CD and 2xLP. Holter began writing the album in 2016, and later recorded demos of the songs at home. Many of the vocal takes from those solo recordings, which she used to guide collaborators in the studio, ended up on the album.

Alongside the album announcement, Holter announced a North American and European tour in support of the album. The tour began in Lake Perris on October 14.

== Critical reception ==
Aviary ratings
Aggregate scores
Source	Rating
AnyDecentMusic?	7.8/10
Metacritic	83/100
Review scores
Source	Rating
AllMusic	4.5/5 stars
Consequence	B+
Exclaim!	9/10
Financial Times	3/5 stars
The Guardian	4/5 stars
Mojo	3/5 stars
Pitchfork	8.2/10
Q	4/5 stars
Resident Advisor	4.3/5
Uncut	8/10

Aviary was met with widespread critical acclaim. At Metacritic, which assigns a normalized rating out of 100 to reviews from professional publications, the album received an average score of 83, based on 23 reviews. Aggregator AnyDecentMusic? gave it 7.8 out of 10, based on their assessment of the critical consensus.

Matthew Blenkarn of Exclaim! wrote, "Sweeping and intimate all at once, Aviary never settles for comforting platitudes or dour resignation. It's honest, it's hopeful, and it's surely among Holter's finest achievements". Under the Radar's J. Pace stated that while the album "may appear to be on fire, it has always been so, and the everyday emergency in which we find ourselves is not the exception: it's the rule. And surrounded by all this noise, this eternal series of accidents, Holter the poet chooses to process it all and create something beautiful". James Oldham of Q wrote, "It's not always easy, but it is frequently brilliant". Reviewing the album for AllMusic, Heather Phares stated: "Holter answers the chaos of 21st century life by following her bliss; the results are a constellation of moments that celebrate the fullness of her music and, as always, make for fascinating listening."

Jim Wirth of Uncut said, "There are jarring moments but Holter's quest to channel the clatter of the universe produces transcendent beauty too". In a more critical review, Chris White of MusicOMH said, "Aviary is not a great album—it's too much of an ordeal for that accolade, requiring multiple listens to even start to engage with meaningfully. But it is, in its own idiosyncratic way, a towering artistic accomplishment. Just be prepared for a hard slog scaling the summit". Mojo's Andrew Male gave the album a mixed review, writing, "It's all so sad, and surrounded by 80-plus minutes of restless, questing uncertainty". Consequence's David Sackllah wrote, "While some edits could have crafted a more concise record, this grand, indulgent piece finds Holter at the height of her ability. Even the quiet periods are always entrancing". Rachel Aroesti of The Guardian said, "Holter doesn't drop quite enough of these joyful crumbs to cajole the listener through the entirety of this 90-minute epic—yet there remains a glut of beauty and braininess in store for those willing to stick around".

=== Rankings ===
Select rankings of Aviary
Publication	List	Rank	Ref.
Consequence	The Top 50 Albums of 2018	25	
The Guardian	The 50 Best Albums of 2018	19	
MusicOMH	MusicOMH's Top 50 Albums of 2018	16	
Noisey	Noisey's 100 Best Albums of 2018	14	
Pitchfork	The 50 Best Albums of 2018	24	
Pitchfork	The 200 Best Albums of the 2010s	109	
PopMatters	The 70 Best Albums of 2018	16	
The Quietus	Quietus Albums of the Year 2018	20	
The Wire	The Top 50 Releases of the Year	12	

== Track listing ==
All tracks are written by Julia Holter, except "Les Jeux to You", written by Holter and Devra Hoff.

Aviary track listing
No.	Title	Length
1.	"Turn the Light On"	4:16
2.	"Whether"	2:58
3.	"Chaitius"	8:10
4.	"Voce Simul"	6:34
5.	"Everyday Is an Emergency"	7:45
6.	"Another Dream"	6:07
7.	"I Shall Love 2"	5:18
8.	"Underneath the Moon"	6:49
9.	"Colligere"	6:11
10.	"In Gardens' Muteness"	6:36
11.	"I Would Rather See"	4:51
12.	"Les Jeux to You"	6:18
13.	"Words I Heard"	6:39
14.	"I Shall Love 1"	5:09
15.	"Why Sad Song"	6:07
Total length:		89:48

Notes

- "I Would Rather See" contains lyrics derived from "I Would Rather See" by Sappho as translated by Anne Carson.
- "Why Sad Song" contains portions of "Kyema Mimin", written by Choying Drolma and Steve Tibbetts.

== Personnel ==
Credits adapted from the liner notes of Aviary.

Musicians

- Julia Holter – vocals, keyboards
- Dina Maccabee – violin, viola, vocals
- Andrew Tholl – violin
- Tashi Wada – synths, bagpipes
- Sarah Belle Reid – trumpet
- Devra Hoff – double bass
- Corey Fogel – percussion

Production

- Julia Holter – production, arrangements, recording
- Kenny Gilmore – production, recording, engineering, mixing
- Cole M.G.N. – executive production
- Connor Grant – additional bass recording (track 12)
- David Ives – mastering
- Dicky Bahto – artwork
- Matthew Cooper – design

== Charts ==
Chart performance for Aviary
Chart (2018)	Peak position
German Albums (Offizielle Top 100)	86
Scottish Albums (OCC)	34
Spanish Albums (PROMUSICAE)	94
Swiss Albums (Schweizer Hitparade)	99
UK Albums (OCC)	73
US Heatseekers Albums (Billboard)	16

== Release history ==
Release formats for Aviary
Region	Date	Label	Format	Ref.
Various	October 26, 2018	Domino	2xLP; double CD; digital download	
