= Shannon Lay =

American folk and punk musician (born 1990)

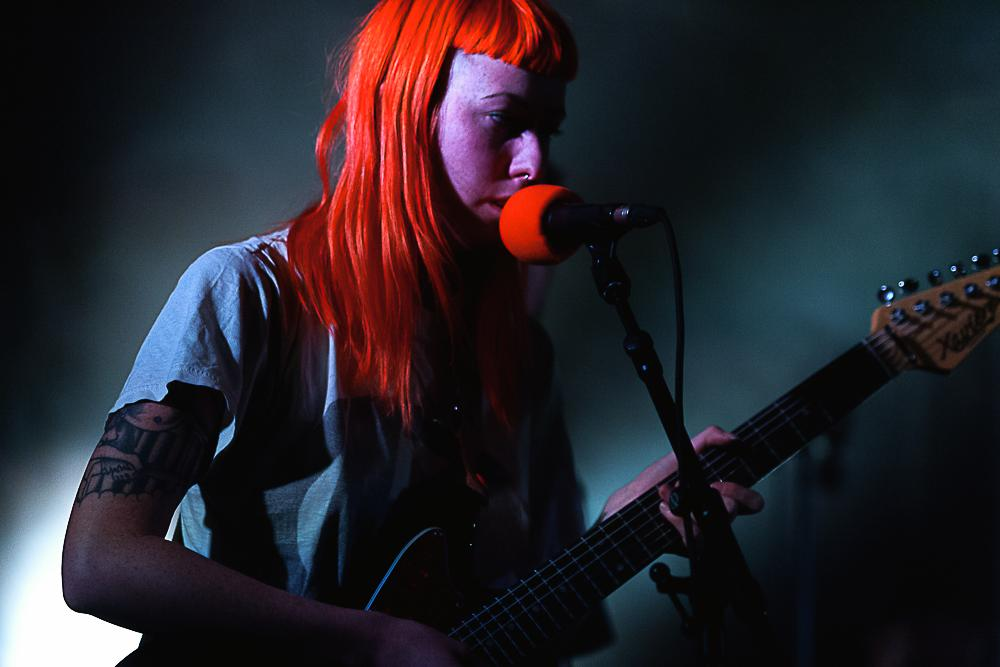
- Lay in 2016

Background information
- Born: 1990 (age 35–36)
- Genres: Folk, punk
- Years active: 2015–present

Shannon Lay (born September 1, 1990) is an American folk and punk musician. She has released five solo albums and was a member of the band Feels.

== Early life and career ==
Lay grew up in Redondo Beach, California, a second-generation Irish-American, and started playing guitar at age 13. She left Redondo Beach for Los Angeles when she was 17 years old. She was the lead guitarist in the band Facts on File, and later joined Raw Geronimo, who changed their name to Feels after several members left and others joined. Feels released two albums with Lay as a member: Feels (2016) and Post Earth (2019). Lay left Feels in January 2020. She is also a member of the Freedom Band, Ty Segall's backing band.

She has cited The Damned, Stephen Malkmus, Nick Drake, Negative Approach, the Ramones, Slayer, The Velvet Underground and X as influences.

== Solo career ==
=== Holy Heartache (2015) ===
Lay's debut recording, Holy Heartache (2015), is a collection of 16 demos recorded at home. In 2018 she described it as "just me putting songs on Bandcamp," and commented "It never felt like an official release."

=== All This Life Going Down (2016) ===
All This Life Going Down was released in 2016. Simon Weedn of the L.A. Record described the album as "one of the most beautifully delicate bedroom-pop albums one might hope to hear", praised its intimacy and observed that "There is never a moment that passes where it doesn’t feel like Lay is in the room, performing these songs by herself."

=== Living Water (2017) ===
Living Water was released in 2017 by Mare Records, an imprint of Woodsist founded by Kevin Morby specifically in order to release the album.

Writing in The Straits Times, Yeow Kai Chai compared Living Water to Nick Drake's Pink Moon and Vashti Bunyan's Just Another Diamond Day and wrote: "With an observant eye for nature's ways and an ear for the rhythms of the heart, [Lay] intuits life's bountiful lessons." Philip Sherburne of Pitchfork praised "Home" as "a good glimpse of what makes Lay’s music special" and argued that "Living Water is shot through with a kind of ragged hope—not optimism, exactly, but a determined belief in the power of that life force to pull us all toward something like transcendence."

In 2018, Lay released a live session recorded for Audiotree featuring three songs from Living Water, two from All This Life Going Down and two previously unreleased songs.

=== August (2019) ===
August, Lay's first album as a full-time musician after quitting her day job and her first album for Sub Pop, was released in 2019. It was co-produced by Lay and Ty Segall and features a wider array of instrumentation than her previous albums.

Mark Deming of AllMusic noted that the more complex sound did not come at the expense of a sense of intimacy, and wrote that "she creates tunes with a simple grace that's a superb match for the lyrics which revel in the glorious mysteries of the world around us. And it's welcome to hear a contemporary artist who so comfortably embraces their folkie side without a sense of irony and with both feet planted firmly in reality". Pitchfork's Erin Osmon praised "Death Up Close" and "November" and argued that Lay's "vision is clear-eyed, poetic, and for all the ways she channels the greats ... she also chisels her own name in the canon". Writing in Clash, Wilf Skinner commented that "August is best at its most meditative, even if its gravity belies a certain goofiness", and described the album as "more self-assured and hopeful" than Living Water; while Hannah Siden of Exclaim! praised Lay's "unusual choices in some places – playing with tempo, dynamics and instrumentals" and assessed the album as "hypnotic, assured" and "at its best when it locks into moments of relaxed momentum, buoyed by gently driving, repetitive instrumentals".

In December 2019, Lay released "Blue" and "We Mend" through the Sub Pop Singles Club. In June 2020, Lay collaborated with Steve Gunn to cover Blaze Foley's "Clay Pigeons" as a fundraiser for the Black Visions Collective.

=== Geist (2021) ===
Geist was released on October 8, 2021. The album features collaborations with Devra Hoff and Ty Segall, and is produced by Lay and Jarvis Taveniere. The album features a cover of Syd Barrett's "Late Night". "Rare to Wake" is inspired by Frank Herbert's novel Dune.

Reviewing Geist for Pitchfork, Emma Madden described the album as "the sound of an artist seeing themselves—their personality and temperament—reflected back to them for the first time" and likened Lay's role on the album to that of "a spiritual guide, kindly and patiently directing the listener towards their own sense of inner tranquility." Pitchfork later listed "Rare to Wake" as one of the 100 best songs of 2021. Ben Niesen of Atwood Magazine wrote that Geist "documents [Lay's] continued transformation into a bona fide singer/songwriter", noted the influence of Celtic music and the work of Anne Briggs, and likened tracks to songs by Brian Eno, Bert Jansch and Joni Mitchell. Writing in The Guardian, Kitty Empire described Geist as "even more assured and contemplative" than August, noted the album's theme of the relationship between forward motion and personal growth, and praised the album's instrumentation. Identifying the album as one of a number of "standout albums from the new singer-songwriter movement" released during the COVID-19 pandemic, Daniel de Visé of Spin described its songs as "some of the most starkly beautiful folk guitar figures put to vinyl since Nick Drake plucked his last."

=== Covers Vol. 1 (2023) ===
Lay released a covers album, entitled Covers Vol. 1 and featuring versions of songs by Vashti Bunyan, Arthur Russell, Ty Segall, The Velvet Underground and others, in April 2023. Mark Moody of Under the Radar described Covers Vol. 1 as offering a valuable insight into Lay's influences, and described covers of Sibylle Baier's "I Lost Something in the Hills" and Osees's "I Am Slow" as "tracks that stand out the most for providing the listener the least to grab onto." Stephen M. Deusner of Pitchfork argued that the album's covers "rely on subtle changes", not only cataloging Lay's influences but also demonstrating "how she continues to live with them", and praised Lay's versions of songs by peers such as Ty Segall's "The Keeper".

=== Past the Veil (2026) ===
Lay's fifth album, Past the Veil, was released in July 2026 on All the Best, Lay's own label. The album was characterized by more expansive arrangements, including pedal steel guitar, piano and synthesisers, and a larger team of musicians than her previous albums. Lay described the album's title as a reference to "the idea of the discomfort you have to move through."

=== Other work ===
Lay appears on Devra Hoff's album Voices from the Empty Moor (Songs of Anne Briggs) (2021), a tribute to the English folk singer Anne Briggs, and Ezra Furman's song "Point Me Toward the Real" (2022). In April 2024, Lay released "Mirrors" as a standalone single.
