= Nite Jewel =

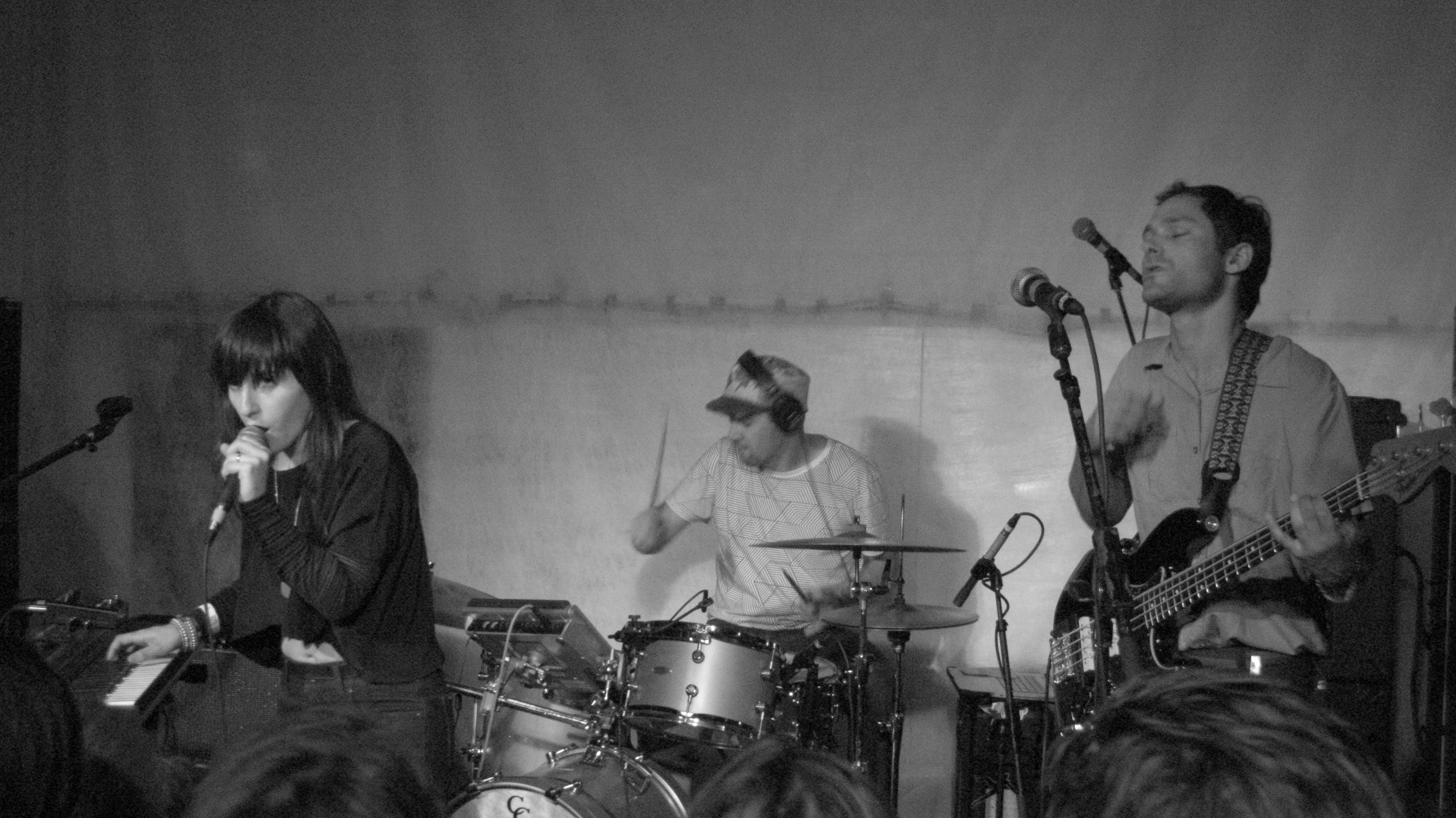

Background information
- Born: Ramona Gonzalez
- Origin: Oakland, California
- Genres: Alternative dance, chillwave, electronic, hypnagogic pop, PBR&B
- Occupations: Singer-songwriter, multimedia artist, record producer
- Instruments: Vocals, keyboards
- Years active: 2008–present
- Labels: Gloriette (current), Human Ear Music, No Pain in Pop, Italians Do It Better, Secretly Canadian, Mexican Summer (former)
- Spouse: Cole Greif-Neill (m. 2006; div. 2018)
- Website: nitejewel.com

Ramona Gonzalez (known professionally as Nite Jewel) is an American singer-songwriter, producer, multimedia artist, author and academic from Los Angeles, California. Her music combines elements of pop, R&B, lo-fi, hip hop, krautrock and electronica; she came to prominence in the late 2000s and was often associated with the loose genres chillwave, glo-fi and hypnagogic pop. She is currently assistant professor of music at Occidental Collage, Los Angeles.

== Biography ==
Ramona Gonzalez was born in Oakland then rased in Berkley. In the mid 2000s she relocated to Los Angeles to start a bachelor's degree in philosophy at Occidental College, though she cites the DIY music scene in Los Angeles and particularly her love of Ariel Pink's music as a prime motivation for moving there. During her studies she became very involved with this scene: she played bass and sang with an "internet-less" band, Young & Natural with Oscar Vardy and her future husband Cole M. Grief-Neill, and connected with the likes of Holy Shit (then a duo of Pink and Matt Fishbeck) Julia Holter and John Maus. She also created multimedia art and exhibited a number of video and sound installation pieces in the L.A area, one of which was entitled The Question Concerning Technology

Gonzalez launched Nite Jewel in 2008 while juggling music with undergraduate studies. She cites artists such as Janet Jackson and Mariah Carey as her early musical inspirations., as well as the electronic production values of Kraftwerk and Bay Area hip hop. With assistance from Grief-Neill in beat-making, she wrote and created songs on a portable eight-track cassette recorder. She stated that "moments of ecstasy, emotion, and hardship" were her inspiration for those recordings. in 2009 she released the album Good Evening.

Soon after starting her MySpace music page, her song, "Suburbia" was selected to be in Noah Baumbach's film Greenberg. Within a year she was touring European festivals. Her music drew comparison to Lisa Lisa and Cult Jam, Cocteau Twins and contemporary R&B such as Aaaliyah and Timbaland. She was often associated with the chillwave genre; Gonzalez initially "despised" the label, viewing it as a media creation to group unrelated artists, and preferred her own stylistic descriptor "liquid cool" though she later became comfortable with the chillwave association. While she later reflected that her early work "helped define the genre," she also expressed frustration regarding the erasure of female artists and women of color from the historical narrative of the movement. Following Good Morning she became fascinated by English electronic music duo Autechre and has since cited them as one of her greatest influences She has also compared herself to the Canadian outsider electronic composer and innovator Bruce Haack.

December 6, 2011, Nite Jewel released her single, "She's Always Watching You". On March 6, 2012, Ramona released her second album One Second of Love, on Secretly Canadian. The company reissued the first album, Good Evening, on vinyl in 2012.

After releasing her debut album for Secretly Canadian, Nite Jewel toured both North America and Europe. She performed Kraftwerk's Computer World in Los Angeles' Krautrock Classics on June 1, 2012. Later that summer, she traveled to New York City to perform in the same event at Le Poisson Rouge.

On April 29, 2012, Nite Jewel performed at the Brandeis University Springfest.

In 2013, her song "Nowhere To Go" was featured in Grand Theft Auto V's in-game radio station, Radio Mirror Park.

Gonzalez left Secretly Canadian and recorded her third album, Liquid Cool, which was released in June 2016 on her own label, Gloriette. She cited OMD's "The Romance of the Telescope" (1983) as a prominent influence during the recording process.

In 2018, she began a Ph.D. in musicology at the University of California, Los Angeles, where she also taught Audio Technology. The following year she took up a position as assistant professor of music at Occidental Collage, Los Angeles.

On August 27, 2021, her fifth studio album No Sun was released via Gloriette.

Her PhD thesis, Why Sad Songs?: Women’s Laments in Popular Music, was completed in 2025 amd made available through the University of California’s eScholarship repository; as of 2026 a book of the same name is forthcoming.

== Personal life ==
In January 2006, Gonzalez married Cole Marsden Greif-Neill. The couple split in 2018 after twelve years of marriage.

== Discography ==
=== LPs ===
- Good Evening (2008)
- One Second of Love (2012)
- Liquid Cool (2016)
- Real High (2017)
- No Sun (2021)

=== EPs ===
- Want You Back (2009)
- You F O (2009)
- Am I Real? (2010)
- Nite Funk (2016) (with Dam-Funk)
- Obsession (2017)

=== Singles ===
- What Did He Say (2008)
- She's Always Watching You (2011)
- It Goes Through Your Head (2011)

== Collaborations ==
- Nite Jewelia – collaboration between Nite Jewel and Julia Holter
- "Am I Gonna Make It" – Nite Funk (collaboration between Nite Jewel and Dâm-Funk)
- Heart Shaped Rock EP – Jason Grier w/Nite Jewel
- "Thinking About You" – Frank Ocean cover done by Nite Jewel & Nicholas Krgovich
- "What We See" – collaboration between Nite Jewel & Julia Holter for Dublab
- AMTHST – collaboration between Nite Jewel and Droop-E
