= Sean Hayes (musician) =

American singer-songwriter

- Hayes in 2010

Background information
- Born: August 27, 1969 (age 57); New York City, New York, U.S.
- Origin: Greensboro, North Carolina, U.S.
- Genres: Folk, indie, soul
- Occupation: Singer-songwriter
- Instruments: Guitar, vocals
- Website: www.seanhayesmusic.com

Sean Padrick Hayes (born August 27, 1969) is an American singer-songwriter.

== Early life ==
Hayes was born in New York City, and raised in Greensboro, North Carolina. He began playing traditional American and Irish music with a band called the Boys of Bluehill. As a young musician he traveled the southeast, from the Black Mountain Music festival (LEAF Festival) in the Blue Ridge Mountains down to Charleston, South Carolina and eventually to San Francisco, where he lived for two decades before moving to Sonoma County.

== Career ==
Sean Hayes and Moreese Bickham in 2009 at the Rickshaw Stop in San Francisco

In his thirty plus year career as a musician, Hayes has won acclaim from fans and critics alike and had his music featured in a variety of television shows, films, and commercials. Hayes' song "Rattlesnake Charm" was re-mixed by DJ Mark Farina, and also appears on the Stéphane Pompougnac compilation Hôtel Costes, Vol. 8. His song "3 A.M." is featured on the soundtrack for the television show Kyle XY, and his song "A Thousand Tiny Pieces", was covered by The Be Good Tanyas and the group Blame Sally, and has appeared on the television show Brothers & Sisters. The song is also referenced in the Moth Radio Hour story as told by theoretical cosmologist Janna Levin. The HBO show Bored to Death featured his song "Fucked Me Right Up" on its second episode as well as on the soundtrack for the first season. This song was also featured in the German film Resturlaub (2011). His song "Turnaroundturnmeon" is part of Big Change: songs for FINCA, an album curated by Natalie Portman to benefit the anti-poverty organization FINCA. Hayes was also featured singing the duet "Ballantines" with Aimee Mann, released on her album Smilers. Hayes' song "Lucky Man" was used in the season four trailer for the show Rectify on the Sundance Channel.

His song "Powerful Stuff" was featured on the NBC sitcom, Parenthood and again by Subaru of America as part of its campaign for the Subaru Forester in the "Reunion" commercial.

Hayes' song "Rosebush Inside" was inspired by a man named Moreese Bickham, who survived 38 years inside the Louisiana State Penitentiary at Angola, with fourteen years in solitary confinement. Hayes first heard Mr. Bickham's voice and spirit as expressed through the Sound Portraits story titled, "Tossing Away the Keys". In January 2009, Sean Hayes and Moreese Bickham were able to meet in person when Mr. Bickham attended a live performance at the Rickshaw Stop in San Francisco. The story behind "Rosebush Inside" and their meeting is also featured on NPR's Snap Judgment with Glen Washington in show "Found."

Hayes made a cameo appearance as Jesus in the film Evolution: The Musical!, which premiered at the San Francisco International Film Festival in 2008.

Hayes' music was featured in the HBO film Happening: A Clean Energy Revolution, a documentary by James Redford that explores climate change and renewable energy.

The album Bright on Bright was released on September 15, 2026, and marks his tenth release.

Hayes currently lives in Petaluma, CA with his wife and two sons.

== Discography ==
- A Thousand Tiny Pieces (1999)
- Lunar Lust (2002)
- Alabama Chicken (2003)
- Big Black Hole and the Little Baby Star (2006)
- Flowering Spade (2007)
- Run Wolves Run (2010)
- Before We Turn to Dust (2012)
- Low Light (2016)
- Be Like Water (2021)
- Bright on Bright (2026)
