= Run Wolves Run =

Sean Hayes

Studio album by Sean Hayes
- Released: March 16, 2010
- Genre: Folk, pop
- Length: 41:53

Sean Hayes chronology
| Flowering Spade (2007) | Sean Hayes (2010) | Before We Turn To Dust (2012) |

Run Wolves Run is the sixth album by Sean Hayes. It was released on March 16, 2010.

== Track listing ==
1. "When We Fall In"
2. "Open Up A Window"
3. "Garden"
4. "Powerful Stuff"
5. "So Down"
6. "Gunnin"
7. "Shake Your Body"
8. "Me And My Girl"
9. "One Day The River"
10. "Soul Shaker"
11. "Stella Seed"
