= Tragedy (Julia Holter album) =

Studio album by Julia Holter
- Released: August 30, 2011
- Genres: Avant-pop; musique concrète; ambient; drone
- Length: 51:15
- Labels: Leaving Records; Night School Records
- Producer: Julia Holter

Julia Holter chronology
Tragedy (2011)	Ekstasis (2012)

Tragedy is the debut studio album by American musician Julia Holter, released by Leaving Records on August 30, 2011. Pitchfork wrote that Tragedy was Holter's "first LP... [which] calls to mind the arty, austere work of Laurie Anderson, Grouper, and Meredith Monk".

The album is inspired by Hippolytus, a play by Euripides. Holter recorded Tragedy independently with mostly electronic instrumentation, largely out of necessity, since she lacked the funds to hire many session musicians.

== Reception ==
Professional ratings
Review scores
Source	Rating
The List	4/5 stars
Pitchfork	8/10

Tragedy was received positively by music critics, who cited Holter as an innovative avant-garde electronic artist. Mike Powell, reviewing the album for Pitchfork, wrote that "Holter has made a dreamy, intense album that aligns with a variety of traditions but, like a lot of great contemporary music, synthesizes them in novel or at least artful ways".

== Track listing ==
No.	Title	Length
1.	"Introduction"	3:08
2.	"Try to Make Yourself a Work of Art"	6:55
3.	"The Falling Age"	9:14
4.	"Goddess Eyes"	3:25
5.	"Interlude"	2:26
6.	"Celebration"	9:49
7.	"So Lillies"	7:19
8.	"Finale"	8:05
Total length:		51:15

The original vinyl and CD releases present the tracklist differently, combining tracks 1 and 2, and tracks 5 and 6.

== Personnel ==
Credits adapted from liner notes.

- Julia Holter – producer
- Matthewdavid – mastering engineer, chorus (8)
- Calarts Twentieth Century Players – ensemble (2)
- Casey Anderson – saxophone (2, 6, 8), chorus (8)
- Darryl Holter – chorus (8)
- James Klopfleisch – chorus (8)
- Mark So – chorus (8)
- Scott Cazan – chorus (8)
- Sepand Shahab – chorus (8)
- Johann Sebastian Bach – music (8)
