= Julia Holter =

American singer-songwriter

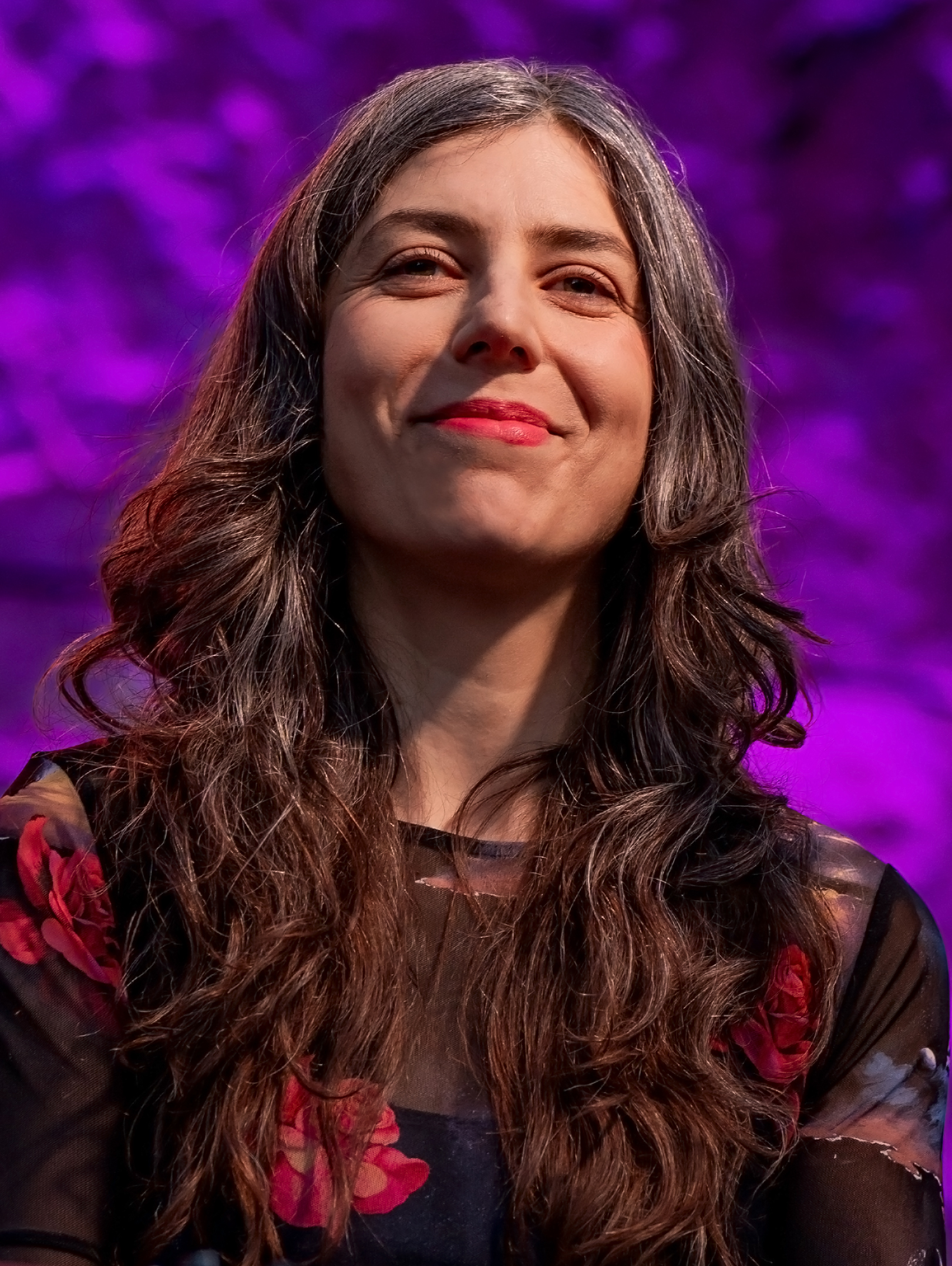
- Holter in 2024
- Born: Julia Shammas Holter; December 18, 1984 (age 41); Milwaukee, Wisconsin, U.S.
- Education: University of Michigan (BA); California Institute of the Arts (MFA)
- Employer: Occidental College
- Musical career
- Genres: Art pop; chamber pop; ambient; modern classical
- Occupations: Musician; singer; songwriter; composer; producer
- Instruments: Vocals; keyboards; organ; harpsichord; drums
- Years active: 2006–present
- Labels: Leaving; RVNG; Domino
- Website: juliaholter.com

Julia Shammas Holter (born December 18, 1984) is an American singer-songwriter, record producer, composer, artist, and academic, based in Los Angeles. Her work has received critical acclaim and incorporates elements of art pop, chamber pop, baroque pop and ambient. Following three independent album productions, Holter released Tragedy as her first official studio album in 2011. Ekstasis followed in 2012. After signing with Domino Records in 2013, she released the albums Loud City Song (2013), Have You in My Wilderness (2015), the live-in-the-studio album In the Same Room (2017) and the double album Aviary (2018).

Holter composed the score for the 2020 film Never Rarely Sometimes Always and released Behind the Wallpaper (2023) in collaboration with Spektral Quartet and Alex Temple. She released the studio album Something in the Room She Moves in 2024, with a companion album, Materia, released in August 2026.

Holter has also collaborated with other musicians, including Nite Jewel, Laurel Halo, Ariel Pink, Ducktails, Linda Perhacs, Michael Pisaro, and Jean-Michel Jarre.

== Biography ==
Holter was born in Milwaukee, Wisconsin. At age six her family moved to Los Angeles, where she later attended the Alexander Hamilton High School. She studied music at University of Michigan for four years, graduating with a degree in composition. After seeing Michael Pisaro perform an avant-garde composition in Michigan, she was inspired to study with him at CalArts, where she graduated from another composition program. Holter contributed songs to multiple compilation albums in 2008. In 2010, she began playing with Linda Perhacs' band and released a CD-R titled Celebration and a collection of live recordings.

Following three independently produced albums – Phaedra Runs to Russia (2007), Cookbook (2008), and Celebration (2010), Holter's official debut album, Tragedy, was released in August 2011 on Leaving Records. Inspired by Euripides' Greek play Hippolytus, the album received generally favorable reviews and was named one of NPR's "Best Outer Sound Albums of 2011".

Holter released her second album, Ekstasis, in March 2012 on the RVNG Intl. label. The album drew comparisons to works by such artists as Laurie Anderson, Julianna Barwick, Kate Bush, Joanna Newsom, Grouper, and Stereolab, and received many positive reviews. Holter spent three years making the album, whose title comes from the Greek word meaning "outside of oneself." The music video for album track "Moni Mon Amie", directed by Yelena Zhelezov, was also released in March.

In addition to collaborating with other California-based musicians like Nite Jewel (Ramona Gonzalez), Holter released her third album, Loud City Song, in August 2013 on Domino Records. It was universally acclaimed by critics and unlike her preceding albums, which were recorded mostly alone in her bedroom, Holter recorded Loud City Song with an ensemble of musicians.

In 2015, Holter released the album Have You in My Wilderness, which was acclaimed by critics and became her most successful charting release to date. She also contributed to Ducktails' fifth studio album, St. Catherine, with her bandmates Chris Votek and Andrew Tholl.

Holter collaborated with Jean-Michel Jarre on a song for the second part of the Electronica double album, released on July 18, 2016.

In November 2016, she curated her own program during the tenth-anniversary edition of Le Guess Who? Festival in Utrecht. This program included performances by Laurel Halo, Josephine Foster, Maya Dunietz, Jessica Moss and other artists.

In September 2017, she performed a world premier of her scoring of the 1928 silent French film The Passion of Joan of Arc on September 29 at the FIGat7th in downtown Los Angeles.

In September 2018, Holter announced her fifth commercially released album, Aviary, and released the lead single "I Shall Love 2". She followed it with another single, "Words I Heard", before the album's release on October 26. The record was praised for its scope and ambition and appeared on multiple year end lists for the best albums of 2018.

In 2021, Holter was appointed the Johnston-Fix Professor of the Practice in Songwriting; Visiting Assistant Professor at Occidental College in Los Angeles.

Holter released her sixth studio album, Something in the Room She Moves, on March 22, 2024 on Domino. The album received widespread critical acclaim. Later that same year, Holter contributed to her partner and longtime bandmate Tashi Wada's studio album, What Is Not Strange?, released in June 2024.

Holter's seventh studio album, Materia, was released on August 21, 2026. Described as a "companion" album to Something in the Room She Moves, the album was produced by Kenny Gilmore and features contributions from Holter's bandmates Tashi Wada, Elizabeth Goodfellow, Devra Hoff and Chris Speed

== Style ==
The Guardian wrote that "Holter's vocal register [...] faintly recalls Siouxsie Sioux or Nico". Under the Radar similarly compared her to other female artists saying; "Holter is Siouxsie Sioux meets Kate Bush, with a matchstick intensity, relighting her own wick by the conversation in her voice, her diaphragm shifting between instruments".

== Personal life ==
Holter was previously in a relationship with former Real Estate guitarist and Ducktails frontman Matt Mondanile. In 2015, she contributed to his Ducktails album, St. Catherine. In the wake of sexual misconduct allegations against Mondanile, Holter divulged that Mondanile was "emotionally abusive to the point where I had to have a lawyer intervene and was afraid for my life."

Holter is married to musician Tashi Wada, son of the sound artist Yoshi Wada. They have been in a relationship since 2015, and they have a daughter together who was born during the COVID-19 pandemic. Holter and Wada first met in 2007 when they both played in a harmonium ensemble organized by their friend James. Holter collaborated with Wada on his 2024 studio album, What Is Not Strange?.

== Discography ==
=== Studio albums ===
List of studio albums, with selected chart positions
Title	Album details	Peak chart positions						
Title	Album details	US Heat	BEL (FL)	BEL (WA)	NLD	NOR	SWI	UK
Phaedra Runs to Russia	Released: 2007; Label: self-released; Format: CD-R	—	—	—	—	—	—	—
Eating the Stars	Released: 2007; Label: Human Ear Music; Format: CD-R	—	—	—	—	—	—	—
Cookbook	Released: 2008; Label: Sleepy Mammal Sound; Format: CD-R	—	—	—	—	—	—	—
Celebration	Released: November 12, 2010; Label: Engraved Glass; Format: CD	—	—	—	—	—	—	—
Tragedy	Released: August 30, 2011; Label: Leaving; Formats: LP, CD, digital download	—	—	—	—	—	—	—
Ekstasis	Released: March 8, 2012; Label: RVNG; Formats: LP, CD, digital download	49	—	—	—	—	—	—
Loud City Song	Released: August 19, 2013; Label: Domino; Formats: LP, CD, digital download	19	60	140	91	20	88	103
Have You in My Wilderness	Released: September 25, 2015; Label: Domino; Formats: LP, CD, digital download	3	56	107	36	—	—	29
Aviary	Release date: October 26, 2018; Label: Domino; Formats: LP, CD, digital download	16	81	—	—	—	99	73
Behind the Wallpaper (with Spektral Quartet)	Release date: March 3, 2023; Label: Amsterdam Records; Formats: LP, digital download	—	—	—	—	—	—	—
Something in the Room She Moves	Release date: March 22, 2024; Label: Domino; Formats: LP, CD, digital download	—	—	—	—	—	—	—
Materia	Release date: August 21, 2026; Label: Domino; Formats: LP, CD, digital download	—	—	—	—	—	—	—

=== Live albums ===
List of live albums, with selected chart positions
Title	Album details	Peak chart positions
Title	Album details	BEL (FL)
Live Recordings	Released: 2010; Label: NNA Tapes; Format: MC	—
In the Same Room	Released: March 31, 2017; Label: Domino Documents; Format: LP, CD, digital download	126

=== Singles ===
- "Maria" (2011)
- "Marienbad" (2012)
- "In the Same Room" (2012)
- "Goddess Eyes" (2012)
- "World" (2013)
- "In The Green Wild" (2013)
- "Maxims I" (2013)
- "Don't Make Me Over" (2014)
- "Feel You" (2015)
- "Sea Calls Me Home" (2015)
- "Condemnation", with Romona Gonzalez and Nedelle Torissi (2017)
- "I Shall Love 2" (2018)
- "Words I Heard" (2018)
- "So Humble the Afternoon" (2018)
- "Les Jeux to You - Edit" (2019)
- "Gold Dust Woman" (2020)
- "Heloise", with Harper Simon and Meditations On Crime, feat. Geologist (2022)
- "Sun Girl" (2023)

=== Remixes by Julia Holter ===
- "Strange Town" by Buzzy Lee (2021)
