= Ekstasis (Julia Holter album) =

Studio album by Julia Holter
- Released: March 8, 2012
- Genre: Baroque pop; experimental pop; ambient music
- Length: 56:48
- Label: RVNG
- Producer: Julia Holter

Julia Holter chronology
Tragedy (2011)	Ekstasis (2012)	Loud City Song (2013)

Singles from Ekstasis
- 1. "Marienbad" Released: January 10, 2012; 2. "In The Same Room" Released: February 2, 2012; 3. "Goddess Eyes" Released: December 10, 2012

Ekstasis is the second studio album by the American musician Julia Holter. It was released on March 8, 2012, by RVNG Intl. It was preceded by two singles, "Marienbad" and "In The Same Room". A 12" EP, "Goddess Eyes" - which featured both versions of "Goddess Eyes" from the LP - followed in December 2012, after the album had been issued by Domino in the UK on October 26.

== Critical reception ==
Professional ratings
Aggregate scores
Source	Rating
AnyDecentMusic?	7.9/10
Metacritic	83/100
Review scores
Source	Rating
Fact	4/5
Financial Times	4/5 stars
The Guardian	4/5 stars
The Irish Times	4/5 stars
Mojo	4/5 stars
NME	8/10
The Observer	3/5 stars
Pitchfork	8.6/10
Resident Advisor	4.0/5
Uncut	8/10

Ekstasis received widespread acclaim from critics. At Metacritic, which assigns a normalized rating out of 100 to reviews from mainstream publications, the album received an average score of 83, based on 18 reviews.

=== Accolades ===
Year-end rankings for Ekstasis
Publication	Rank	Ref.
Clash	36	
Mojo	9	
musicOMH	27	
Pitchfork	26	
PopMatters	46	
Uncut	23	
The Wire	8	

== Track listing ==
All tracks are written by Julia Holter.

Ekstasis track listing
No.	Title	Length
1.	"Marienbad"	5:24
2.	"Our Sorrows"	6:16
3.	"In the Same Room"	3:58
4.	"Boy in the Moon"	8:19
5.	"Für Felix"	4:10
6.	"Goddess Eyes II"	6:23
7.	"Moni mon amie"	3:31
8.	"Four Gardens"	6:12
9.	"Goddess Eyes I"	3:40
10.	"This Is Ekstasis"	8:54
Total length:		56:48

== Personnel ==
Credits adapted from liner notes.

- Julia Holter – performance, production, engineering
- Corey Granet – guitar (1)
- Catherine Lamb – viola (4)
- Max Kaplan – clarinet (8), bass clarinet (8)
- Casey Anderson – alto saxophone (10)
- Kenny Gilmore – electric bass (10)
- Cole M. Greif-Neill – additional engineering, mixing
- Joe Lambert – mastering
- Kevin O'Neill – cover design
- Rick Bahto – photography

== Charts ==
Chart (2015)	Peak position
US Heatseekers Albums (Billboard)	49
