= Loud City Song =

Studio album by Julia Holter
- Released: August 20, 2013
- Genre: Avant-pop
- Length: 44:40
- Label: Domino
- Producers: Cole M.G.N.; Julia Holter

Julia Holter chronology
Ekstasis (2012)	Loud City Song (2013)	Have You in My Wilderness (2015)

Singles from Loud City Song
- 1. "World" Released: May 22, 2013; 2. "In the Green Wild" Released: August 1, 2013; 3. "Maxim's I" Released: August 7, 2013

Loud City Song is the third studio album by American musician Julia Holter. It was released on August 20, 2013, by Domino Recording Company. The album was co-produced by Holter and Cole M.G.N., marking the second time the pair had worked together. The album was preceded by the singles "World", "In the Green Wild" and "Maxim's I".

== Writing and composition ==
The initial concept for Loud City Song arose out of the sessions for Holter's previous album, Ekstasis. The track "Maxim's I" had been written during the sessions but Holter felt the song didn't fit in with the themes of the album. Instead of discarding the song, Holter used the concepts behind it as inspiration for creating her next album.

"Maxim's I" was primarily influenced by the musical, Gigi. In particular, Holter took inspiration from a scene where the titular character enters a bar to find the other patrons gossiping about her. Holter decided to write a collection of songs based around the way such noise and interaction affects those living in cities. In an interview with The Quietus leading up to album's release, Holter stated that, "We live in a very loud world now. I myself am not the child coming of age – I don't think! – and I'm not grumpy about the loudness, but I'm curious about it. And it's very easy to place a character in today's world who is disenchanted with it and running away, because loudness can be claustrophobic".

The songs on the album explore this concept in different ways. Opening track and single, "World" follows a character journeying through a cityscape at night, while quietly observing its inhabitants. Holter has said that the track was inspired by the poems of Frank O'Hara and the films of Rick Bahto. She described it as a "journal of a person looking out into his/her city, thinking about how it relates to them and reflecting on the themes addressed later on in the record. It's kind of personal and intimate".

The third track, "Horns Surrounding Me" explores the media's fascination with celebrity and its more intrusive extremes. Talking about the song with Interview, Holter stated that "it seems like there's always a celebrity culture. Even back then there was a weekly edition of a newspaper that I reference in the liner notes, where each week the cover was an illustration of the latest gossip, intrigue, romance, whatever. Today it's way more extreme and in your face—that's why the record is called Loud City Song. If you've ever seen paparazzi go after a celebrity, it's really freaky. It looks like they're going to kill them... ...That's what "Horns Surrounding Me" is about. It's so gross and scary".

Fourth track and second single, "In the Green Wild" shows Holter's character learning to cope with the stresses of living within the city. She's described the songs as "about escaping one's oppressive world, losing oneself in another world".

The album also includes a cover of Barbara Lewis' song, "Hello Stranger". Holter had initially decided to exclude the track. In an interview with Dummy, she clarified why she had changed her stance on its inclusion: "It wasn't something that I initially thought of but the reason it works is because there's a scene in Gigi where there are two old people reminiscing about a past relationship or affair they had together. And the song is called "I Remember It Well", but the joke is that they don't remember it very well. So it's very mysterious..."

The album concludes with its longest song, "City Appearing". Holter has described it as "this crazy apocalyptic thing where everyone finds truth and love and has this big city orgy. In my mind there's fire and everything – that people are just getting rid of their hats, getting rid of their conventions, no longer conforming".

== Recording ==
Holter had previously recorded all of her albums by herself. Loud City Song marked the first time that she had decided to record an album within a studio setting. The songs for the album were still composed at home but once Holter had developed a set of songs ready for recording, she contacted producer Cole M.G.N. to produce the album and bring in session musicians to flesh-out her arrangements. Having previously produced records for Ariel Pink and Beck, Grief-Neill's experience working alongside musicians with a background in home recordings made him ideal for the role. Holter has stated that she also chose to work with him due to his ability with handling EQ levels and balancing the mix between instrumentation and vocals.

The album marked the first time that Holter employed session musicians to record many of instruments heard on the album. Once writing was finished, she prepared the musicians by giving them "loose instructions, verbally instead of notated, so then that would leave them free to improvise a little bit, and that was something I'd never be able to do". Holter has publicly stated how the experience moulded her understanding of the process: "I was really used to working alone and felt really self-conscious, but then it blossomed and was amazing. I think working with this many people will be more exciting in some ways, because there's so many rich timbres with the saxophone added to the group. It really blends into the synthesizer and acoustic instruments well."

Holter also used open-air recordings throughout the album. The track "Horns Surrounding Me" opens with "The noise of a running, panting man", which was caught using an open-air microphone. It was recorded by Holter while playing a game of tag with a friend, on a building where she lived in Echo Park.

== Critical reception ==
Loud City Song ratings
Aggregate scores
Source	Rating
AnyDecentMusic?	8.2/10
Metacritic	88/100
Review scores
Source	Rating
AllMusic	4.5/5 stars
Fact	4.5/5
The Guardian	4/5 stars
The Irish Times	4/5 stars
Mojo	4/5 stars
NME	9/10
Pitchfork	8.6/10
Q	4/5 stars
Spin	8/10
Uncut	9/10

Loud City Song was met with widespread critical acclaim. At Metacritic, which assigns a normalized rating out of 100 to reviews from professional publications, the album received an average score of 88, based on 30 reviews. Aggregator AnyDecentMusic? gave it 8.2 out of 10, based on their assessment of the critical consensus.

Heather Phares of AllMusic stated, "Loud City Song is Holter's most polished work to date, and another example of how she upholds and redefines what it means to be an avant-garde singer/songwriter". Rob Hakimian of Beats Per Minute said, "Loud City Song is a true achievement from Julia Holter. Nary is there a hook on the album, but the richness and vividness that she brings to the songs musically and lyrically will hook you more effectively anyway". Alex Robertson of Sputnikmusic stated, "This album is the sound of an excellent singer, songwriter, arranger, and, I'd argue, thinker translating those strengths into some of the most stirring music you'll hear this year. Loud City Song may not be loud, but the echo it makes is unforgettable". Robin Smith of PopMatters stated, "It's an impressive record to listen to—the compositions are even more beautiful than Ekstasis, even though they're often more fragmented—but it's also a frightening depiction of what it feels like to have a whole population making you up in its head". Lindsay Zoladz of Pitchfork stated, "Though it draws upon the distant past, Julia Holter's made a timeless people-watching soundtrack: an acutely felt ode to the mysteries of a million passersby, all the stars of their own silent musicals".

Adam Kivel of Consequence stated, "Loud City Song is a sightseeing trip with a person fully able to portray the objective beauty of the sights, as well as her own take on them". Harriet Gibsone of The Guardian stated, "Barbara Lewis's soul classic "Hello Stranger" gets a chillout makeover, which doesn't quite work; but any faults are obliterated by the album's closer, "City Appearing"". Laura Snapes of NME said, "This is wild music, a celestial cabaret that absorbs and unsettles". Philip Sherburne of Spin stated, "Like Gigi herself, it is a work of perpetual self-invention, an extended state of becoming. Have pity on the inquisitory birds, because it's impossible to look away".

=== Year-end lists ===
Select year-end rankings of Loud City Song
Publication	List	Rank	Ref.
Consequence	Top 50 Albums of 2013	12	
The Guardian	Best albums of 2013	30	
Mojo	Top 50 Albums of 2013	47	
Pitchfork	The Top 50 Albums of 2013	49	
Sputnikmusic	Top 50 Albums of 2013	1	
The Wire	Top 50 Releases of 2013	1	

== Track listing ==
All songs written by Julia Holter, except where noted.

Loud City Song track listing
No.	Title	Writer(s)	Length
1.	"World"		4:52
2.	"Maxim's I"		6:07
3.	"Horns Surrounding Me"		4:46
4.	"In the Green Wild"		4:07
5.	"Hello Stranger"	Barbara Lewis	6:16
6.	"Maxim's II"		5:28
7.	"He's Running Through My Eyes"		2:18
8.	"This Is a True Heart"		3:30
9.	"City Appearing"		7:16
Total length:			44:40

== Personnel ==
Musicians

- Brian Allen – trombone
- Mattie Barbier – trombone
- Corey Fogel – percussion
- Ramona Gonzalez – vocals
- Devra Hoff – double bass, fretless bass
- Julia Holter – vocals, keyboards
- Chris Speed – saxophone
- Andrew Tholl – violin
- Christopher Votek – cello

Production and design

- Rob Carmichael – design
- Kenny Gilmore – assistant engineering
- Peter Granet – engineering
- Cole Marsden Greif-Neill – mixing, producer
- Rick Bahto – photography
- Julia Holter – producer
- David Ives – mastering
- Jake Viator – assistant engineering
- Yelena Zhelezov – drawing

== Charts ==
Chart performance for Loud City Song
Chart (2013)	Peak position
Belgian Albums (Ultratop Flanders)	60
Belgian Albums (Ultratop Wallonia)	140
Dutch Albums (Album Top 100)	91
Norwegian Albums (VG-lista)	20
Swiss Albums (Schweizer Hitparade)	88
US Heatseekers Albums (Billboard)	19
