= Spektral Quartet =

String quartet from Chicago

- Origin: Chicago, United States
- Genres: Classical, Contemporary classical music
- Occupation: String quartet
- Instruments: 2 violins, 1 viola, 1 cello
- Years active: 2010–2022
- Labels: Sono Luminus, Azica Records, Parlour Tapes+, New Amsterdam Records
- Past members: Clara Lyon (violin) 2014-2022; Theo Espy (violin) 2017-2022; Doyle Armbrust (viola) 2010-2022; Russell Rolen (cello) 2010-2022; Aurelien Fort Pederzoli (violin) 2010-2014; J. Austin Wulliman (violin) 2010-2017
- Website: www.spektralquartet.com

Spektral Quartet was a Chicago-based string quartet active from 2010 to 2022, blending traditional string quartet repertoire with new works by living composers. Over its twelve-year career, Spektral Quartet performed at major venues and festivals, commissioned dozens of new works, and released multiple critically acclaimed albums.

== History ==
Founded in 2010, Spektral Quartet quickly gained recognition for its bold programming and deep engagement with Chicago’s contemporary music scene. Their work emphasized collaboration with composers, visual artists, and interdisciplinary creators, culminating in a repertoire that spanned classical, experimental, and avant-garde music. The quartet's commitment to pushing artistic boundaries led to notable projects such as Mobile Miniatures, a commissioning initiative involving dozens of composers including George E. Lewis, Nico Muhly, Shulamit Ran and Augusta Read Thomas, and Once More, With Feeling!, a concert format allowing audiences to hear new works twice in a single performance.

From 2012 to 2019, Spektral Quartet served as the Ensemble-in-Residence at the University of Chicago’s Department of Music, where they worked closely with faculty and students, premiered new compositions, and engaged in educational outreach.

In 2022, Spektral Quartet announced the conclusion of its work as an ensemble. The ensemble’s farewell was met with the Chicago Tribune reflecting on their lasting impact on the chamber music world.

== Discography ==
Spektral Quartet Albums

- Chambers (2013 Parlour Tapes+)
- From This Point Forward (2013 Azica Records)
  - with Julien Labro (bandoneon/accordion) and special guest Miguel Zenón
- Serious Business (2016 Sono Luminus) - GRAMMY-nominated
- Experiments in Living (2020 New Focus Recordings)
- ENIGMA (2021 Sono Luminus)
- Behind the Wallpaper (2023) New Amsterdam Records
  - with Julia Holter (voice) and Alex Temple (composer)

=== Recordings featuring Spektral Quartet ===
- Fin de Siècle (2015, Aparté)
- Of Being Is A Bird (2016, Nimbus Records)
- Ritual Incantations (2018, Nimbus Records)
- Anthony Cheung: Cycles and Arrows (2018, New Focus Records)
- Fanm d'Ayiti (2019, New Amsterdam Records) - GRAMMY-nominated
- Yo Soy La Tradición (2020, Miel Music) - GRAMMY-nominated
- Kotoka Suzuki: Shimmer Tree (2022, Starkland)

== Awards and recognition ==
- Grammy Award Nominee for Best World Music Album (2020) – Fanm d'Ayiti with Nathalie Joachim
- Grammy Award Nominee for Best Latin Jazz Album (2019) – Yo Soy La Tradición with Miguel Zenón
- Grammy Award Nominee for Best Small Ensemble / Chamber Music Album (2017) – Serious Business
- Latin Grammy Nominee for Best Latin Jazz Album (2019) – Yo Soy La Tradición with Miguel Zenón
- National Endowment for the Arts (NEA) Grants:
  - 2019 - Development of ENIGMA by composer Anna Thorvaldsdottir
  - 2021– Recording of Behind the Wallpaper
- Named "Chicagoans of the Year" (2017) by the Chicago Tribune
