= Ducktails =

Ducktail or ducktails may refer to:

- the tails of ducks
- a type of car spoiler
- Ducktails (musical project), an American indie music project
  - Ducktails (album), its self-titled debut studio album
- Duck's ass, or ducktail, a haircut style popular during the 1950s
- an incorrect name for Disney's DuckTales
