= In Mind =

Studio album by Real Estate
- Released: March 17, 2017
- Recorded: June–August 2016
- Studio: Lucy's Meat Market (Los Angeles, California)
- Genre: Indie rock; jangle pop; dream pop; psychedelic rock
- Length: 44:51
- Label: Domino
- Producer: Cole M.G.N.

Real Estate chronology
Atlas (2014)	In Mind (2017)	The Main Thing (2020)

Singles from In Mind
- 1. "Darling" Released: January 24, 2017; 2. "Stained Glass" Released: March 7, 2017

Professional ratings
Aggregate scores
Source	Rating
AnyDecentMusic?	7.1/10
Metacritic	76/100
Review scores
Source	Rating
AllMusic	4.5/5 stars
The A.V. Club	C
Consequence of Sound	B
The Guardian	4/5 stars
Mojo	4/5 stars
Pitchfork	7.2/10
Q	3/5 stars
Record Collector	4/5 stars
The Times	3/5 stars
Uncut	7/10

In Mind is the fourth studio album by American indie rock band Real Estate, released on March 17, 2017, on Domino Records. It is the band's first album since founding member Matt Mondanile's departure, and the first with his replacement as lead guitarist, Julian Lynch.

== Background ==
Before reconvening to work on songs that lead singer Martin Courtney had written for their fourth album, Real Estate decided to part ways with lead guitarist and founding member Matt Mondanile. According to bassist Alex Bleeker, "We decided to part ways because we found it difficult to work together."

The impending split with Mondanile was not a surprise, according to Courtney: "It made a lot of sense to everyone involved. It was definitely not a shock. He was doing Ducktails, but it happened when we were just about to start working on Real Estate again. We kinda saw it coming. It was a little weird not having him around because he was the lead guitar player and a founding member of the band, so he was involved in all aspects of the band, including the business side of things. It was a change. But the four remaining members — including Matt Kallman, who had been in the band for three or four years at that point — were already a tight unit without Matt in the picture."

After the remaining members of Real Estate had begun working on new songs as a four-piece, Courtney traveled to Madison, Wisconsin for a solo show on February 6, 2016. At the show he was joined by Julian Lynch, who was working on his Ph.D. dissertation at University of Wisconsin-Madison and had also contributed electric guitar, organ and vocals to "Asleep", a track on Courtney's solo album, Many Moons.

After the show, Courtney mentioned the guitarist vacancy to Lynch, without expecting him to be available due to his Ph.D. work. But Lynch, a childhood friend of Courtney, Bleeker and Mondanile from Ridgewood who had also played clarinet on Real Estate's previous album, Atlas, offered his services. After consulting with Bleeker, who approved of the idea, Courtney called Lynch to confirm the latter's interest, to which Lynch responded in the affirmative.

On May 25, 2016, the band officially announced Mondanile's departure and Lynch's membership, and that their new album was currently in progress.

== Recording ==
Prior to Lynch joining Real Estate, the band had already started working on songs as a four-piece in Beacon, New York, where Courtney had recently relocated with his wife and their two young daughters. The other band members stayed at an Airbnb down the road from Courtney's residence, and every morning the band would walk to a rented practice space, Cassandra Studio, inside an old high school to work. They recorded full band demos at the practice space with the help of Jarvis Taveniere from the band Woods, in which songs that didn't have lead guitar parts provided by Courtney left space for more prominent keyboard and bass parts. A month after the initial two-week demo sessions, the band returned to Beacon with Lynch on board for another week of work, in which Lynch added textural elements if a song didn't require further lead guitar playing from him.

To produce the album, the band chose to work with Cole M.G.N. According to Bleeker, “We wanted to work with Cole because overall on this record, our goal was to use the studio as an instrument a bit more than we had on previous records." Since Cole insisted on working in Los Angeles, the band rented a house in Los Feliz, and recording took place in June 2016 at Lucy's Meat Market in Eagle Rock. During recording, the band allowed Cole more control compared to previous producers they had worked with, a first for the band. According to Courtney, “Cole played more of a traditional producer role, where we would talk about the arrangements of the songs, and we would talk about song structure and stuff together.”

The album's title was chosen via group text discussion, in which around fifty "progressively dumber" names were proposed before drummer Jackson Pollis suggested In Mind.

== Accolades ==
Publication	Accolade	Year	Rank	Ref.
Uncut	Albums of the Year	2017	65	

== Track listing ==
All tracks are written by Real Estate.

No.	Title	Length
1.	"Darling"	4:20
2.	"Serve the Song"	3:13
3.	"Stained Glass"	3:54
4.	"After the Moon"	4:50
5.	"Two Arrows"	6:50
6.	"White Light"	3:14
7.	"Holding Pattern"	3:46
8.	"Time"	3:49
9.	"Diamond Eyes"	2:34
10.	"Same Sun"	3:17
11.	"Saturday"	5:04
Total length:		44:51

== Personnel ==
- Martin Courtney – vocals, guitar
- Alex Bleeker – bass guitar, vocals (track 9)
- Jackson Pollis – drums and percussion
- Matt Kallman – keyboards
- Julian Lynch – lead guitar

Technical

- Cole M.G.N. – mixing and production
- Greg Calbi – mastering
- Pete Min – assistant engineering

Design

- Robery Beatty – design, logo
- Shawn Brackbill – photography
- Rob Carmichael – graphic design

== Charts ==
Chart (2017)	Peak position
Australian Albums (ARIA)	75
Belgian Albums (Ultratop Flanders)	125
Belgian Albums (Ultratop Wallonia)	85
Dutch Albums (Album Top 100)	43
Scottish Albums (OCC)	66
UK Albums (OCC)	80
US Billboard 200	100
US Top Alternative Albums (Billboard)	13
US Top Rock Albums (Billboard)	17
