= Daniel (album) =

Studio album by Real Estate
- Released: February 23, 2024
- Studio: RCA Studio A (Nashville); Noble Steed (Muscle Shoals)
- Genre: Indie rock; alternative rock
- Length: 37:55
- Label: Domino
- Producer: Daniel Tashian

Real Estate chronology
The Main Thing (2020)	Daniel (2024)

Daniel is the sixth studio album by the American indie rock band Real Estate, released on February 23, 2024, on Domino. Produced by Daniel Tashian, the album was recorded in Nashville, Tennessee, and is the band's first with drummer Sammi Niss, who joined the band in 2020, and their last with lead guitarist Julian Lynch, who departed from the band the following year.

Released to critical acclaim, the album was preceded by the singles "Water Underground", "Haunted World" and "Flowers".

== Background ==
Real Estate released their fifth studio album, The Main Thing, on February 28, 2020, just weeks prior to the worldwide COVID-19 lockdowns. As a result, the band cancelled its touring and promotional plans for the album: "We had to cancel everything, which was a bummer and a big letdown. I don't think I realised how much getting to tour and play the songs for people and talk to them after the show every night was so wrapped up in the whole process of making a record until we didn't do that." Unable to tour, the band continued to work on leftover songs from the album's recording sessions, which were released as an EP, Half a Human, in 2021.

In 2022, primary songwriter Martin Courtney recorded and released his second solo album, Magic Sign, which led to a change in his songs and arranging process: "I think making that solo record reprogrammed or reset the way I approached songwriting. Having done that, I didn't really take it as seriously as I had been taking the past few Real Estate records that I made. I felt like songwriting was getting increasingly like trying to one-up myself and seeing how complex I can get, trying to come up with new chord progressions and try new things. Making the solo record, I was just having fun, doing what came naturally, I guess."

For Real Estate's sixth studio album, Courtney wanted to bring a more relaxed approach to the writing and recording process, which would actively differ from the year-long recording process for The Main Thing: "We worked extra super hard on the last record and felt like it was this big special album. We'd been a band for ten years; it was our fifth album, and we just felt like that record needed to be our best album ever." Bass guitarist and occasional lead vocalist Alex Bleeker noted that in comparison, the sessions for Daniel resulted in the album feeling like a "comeback record, even though we never went anywhere. There's a kind of wisdom in the simplicity of it."

== Recording ==
Real Estate recorded the album over two weeks in Nashville, with producer Daniel Tashian, who had previously worked with Kacey Musgraves, Lily & Madeleine and Jessie James Decker.

Ahead of the recording sessions, the band rehearsed the tracks as a five-piece, aiming to sound like a full band on the album, with limited studio overdubs. Martin Courtney, who predominantly plays an acoustic guitar on the album, noted: "I do think it's our best one; we've gotten better at making records, and we've learned things over the years. But I think this album, to me, is most similar, spiritually, to our third album, Atlas, because the way we made it is similar. We really rehearsed these tracks, and there's not a lot there other than us; we went into the studio and just did it."

== Music video ==
Ahead of the album's release Real Estate released a music video for the album's single "Water Underground" which premiered on November 27, 2023, on YouTube. The video is a tribute to the 1990s Nickelodeon show The Adventures of Pete & Pete and features numerous references to episodes from the show as well as the actors that played "Big" Pete Wrigley, Michael C. Maronna, and "Little" Pete Wrigley, Danny Tamberelli, alongside the five current Read Estate band members. Will McRobb and Chris Viscardi, co-creators of The Adventures of Pete & Pete, along with Michael C. Maronna and Danny Tamberelli, are executive producers on the video.

== Critical reception ==
Professional ratings
Aggregate scores
Source	Rating
Metacritic	77/100
Review scores
Source	Rating
AllMusic	4.5/5 stars
The Line of Best Fit	6/10
Mojo	4/5 stars
The Skinny	4/5 stars
Sputnikmusic	3.8/5
Uncut	8/10

Daniel received a score of 77 out of 100 on review aggregator Metacritic based on 13 critics' reviews, indicating "generally favorable reviews". Mojo felt that "Daniel conveys an expert melancholy. its ups always just on the brink of an elegant down", while Uncut stated that "There is a hint of Nashville in the production, a dash of steel guitar, but the main symptom is the clarity of the sound. It dares to be understated, pushing Real Estate's artful ambivalence into the light".

Lewis Wade of The Skinny wrote that the band "sound peaceful and locked-in almost to a fault" as "this is exactly the album you would expect from Real Estate at this stage". Wade called the first four tracks "absolute vintage RE, with sunny melodies and intricate, polished guitar lines". A staff reviewer from Sputnikmusic remarked that it "delivers the twofold triumphs of, first, delivering satisfactorily upon the band's original talent for hooks and vibe, and second, demonstrating enough variety to suggest that Real Estate doesn't intend to forever languish in their comfort zone to diminishing returns".

== Track listing ==
All tracks are written by Real Estate.

Daniel track listing
No.	Title	Length
1.	"Somebody New"	3:42
2.	"Haunted World"	3:02
3.	"Water Underground"	3:26
4.	"Flowers"	2:48
5.	"Interior"	3:57
6.	"Freeze Brain"	3:28
7.	"Say No More"	3:29
8.	"Airdrop"	3:10
9.	"Victoria"	2:56
10.	"Market Street"	2:49
11.	"You Are Here"	5:08
Total length:		37:55

== Personnel ==
Real Estate

- Alex Bleeker – bass (all tracks); vocals, guitar (track 9)
- Martin Courtney – vocals, acoustic guitar (all tracks); piano (track 11)
- Matt Kallman – keyboards
- Julian Lynch – guitars (all tracks); bass (track 9)
- Sammi Niss – drums

Additional contributors

- Daniel Tashian – production
- Craig Alvin – mixing, engineering
- Phillip Smith – additional engineering
- Sinna Nasseri – cover and interior photos
- Bijan Berahimi – graphic design
- Chris Burnett – graphic design
- Justin Schipper – pedal steel (tracks 2–5, 9)

== Charts ==
Chart performance for Daniel
Chart (2024)	Peak position
Australian Digital Albums (ARIA)	43
Scottish Albums (OCC)	29
UK Album Downloads (OCC)	49
UK Independent Albums (OCC)	15
