= Killin the Vibe =

EP by Ducktails
- Released: 2011
- Genre: Indie rock
- Length: 29:33
- Language: English
- Label: New Images

Ducktails chronology
Ducktails III: Arcade Dynamics (2011)	Killin the Vibe (2011)	The Flower Lane (2013)

Killin the Vibe is a limited edition EP by American psychedelic pop act Ducktails, released in 2011 on primary recording artist Matt Mondanile's own label, New Images. The original version of the title track appears on the project's third studio album, Ducktails III: Arcade Dynamics (2011).

Funded through a Kickstarter campaign, the EP features a re-recorded version of the title track, featuring guest vocals from Animal Collective's Panda Bear and contributions from Dent May and Woods' Jarvis Taveniere.

== Track listing ==
No.	Title	Length
1.	"Killin the Vibe (feat. Panda Bear)"	4:19
2.	"Sit Around With Ya"	3:04
3.	"Couch Surfer"	5:53
4.	"Killin the Vibe (feat. Spectrals) (live)"	5:11
