= Ducktails III: Arcade Dynamics =

Studio album by Ducktails
- Released: January 18, 2011
- Genre: Indie rock, psychedelic pop, dream pop
- Label: Woodsist

Ducktails chronology
Landscapes (2009)	Ducktails III: Arcade Dynamics (2011)	The Flower Lane (2013)

Singles from Ducktails III: Arcade Dynamics
- 1. "Killin the Vibe" Released: 2011

Ducktails III: Arcade Dynamics is the third studio album by the American psychedelic pop act Ducktails, released on January 18, 2011 on Woodsist. The album was recorded at primary recording artist Matt Mondanile's parents' home.

Influenced by Real Estate's touring companions, Deerhunter, Woods, Kurt Vile and Girls, the album features more song-based compositions than on Ducktails' previous releases.

== Background ==
Prior to the album's release, Mondanile described the album as the third part in a trilogy, stating: "My first record was like when you go on vacation, and you’re just like [dipping your toes] in the water. Then the second record was like, 'Alright I’m gonna do this,' and it was this moody kind of basement thing. This record is kind of rockin’. I named it Ducktails III: Arcade Dynamics because it’s all about the effect of putting on a record and listening to it over and over again, and driving around and going to an arcade like when you were little."

== Writing and composition ==
Regarding the project's change in aesthetic from experimental recordings to more song-based compositions, Mondanile noted, "I think it’s because I was on tour with Real Estate and we were playing with lots of indie bands that played pop songs, so I really feel like that influenced me. I’ve played with quite a few indie bands in America, however with Landscapes I was playing a lot more experimental shows, mainly I was making a lot weirder music!"

Citing Deerhunter, Woods, Kurt Vile and Girls as his key influences, Mondanile elaborated: "All those dudes have great songs, but they also improvise a lot. It definitely influenced me in a way for this record, because I wanted to make more songs. But it’s not going to get more and more poppy after this. I want each record to be its own unique thing that attaches to the other records, but I’m just learning how to do what I’m doing. So everything is going to sound different."

== Artwork ==
The album cover features a photograph of a distinctive municipal building in Parque do Bonfim, Setúbal, Portugal, now used as a restaurant. Mondanile said the image came from a postcard he bought while visiting Lisbon: "I was walking around in Lisbon, and there was a flea market, and I pulled it out and was like, 'This is the coolest Frank Lloyd Wright/Dario Argento-style house.' I’m really all about the house and the home; that it’s not about the recording, but about the home or the place that the recording is made in. This may be one of the last records I make at my parents’ house, because I’m getting a little old for that, and the picture is supposed to represent this very comforting image of home, and connecting that to music in a way."

== Reception ==
In a positive review for Pitchfork, Nick Neyland praised the album's song-based direction, writing: "Fortunately, and perhaps wisely, considering the glut of soupy material out there, Arcade Dynamics is a step away from the nebulous constructs of Ducktails' last full-length record Landscapes. Instead, it edges closer to the conventional song structures of Mondanile's work in his other band."

== Track listing ==
No.	Title	Length
1.	"In the Swing"	1:31
2.	"Hamilton Road"	2:24
3.	"Sprinter"	2:10
4.	"The Razor's Edge"	1:52
5.	"Sunset Liner"	2:09
6.	"Little Window"	1:23
7.	"Killin the Vibe"	4:19
8.	"Arcade Shift"	2:54
9.	"Don't Make Plans"	2:24
10.	"Art Vandelay"	3:43
11.	"Porch Projector"	10:06
