= The Flower Lane =

Studio album by Ducktails
- Released: January 28, 2013
- Recorded: Gary's Electric Studio, Brooklyn, New York
- Genres: Indie rock, psychedelic pop, dream pop
- Label: Domino
- Producers: Al Carlson, Ducktails

Ducktails chronology
Ducktails III: Arcade Dynamics (2011)	The Flower Lane (2013)	St. Catherine (2015)

The Flower Lane is the fourth studio album by the American indie rock project Ducktails, released on January 28, 2013 on Domino. Co-produced by Matt Mondanile and Al Carlson, The Flower Lane was the first Ducktails album to be recorded in a full studio environment.

The album's overall aesthetic resembles a full band recording, and features contributions from Big Troubles, Joel Ford, Daniel Lopatin, Sam Mehran, Martin Courtney and Madeline Follin.

== Background and recording ==
The album was recorded in 2012 at Gary's Electric Studio, in Brooklyn, New York. Regarding the recording location, primary recording artist Matt Mondanile noted: "I loved recording at Gary’s Electric Studio because it’s like four or five blocks from my house, so every day I’d get out of bed and spend about twelve hours there. I’ve always wanted to do a record like that."

Unlike Mondanile's previous Ducktails releases, the album featured collaborations from other artists: "People would just walk into the studio and see how they could change the record. I’d spent so much time recording by myself, so I thought this would be something different.”

== Reception ==
Professional ratings
Aggregate scores
Source	Rating
Metacritic	72/100
Review scores
Source	Rating
The A.V. Club	B
Allmusic	4.5/5 stars
The Guardian	3/5 stars
Mojo	4/5 stars
NME	5/10
Paste	6/10
Pitchfork Media	7.1/10
Popmatters	5/10 stars
Q	4/5 stars
Slant Magazine	3.5/5 stars

In a mostly positive for Pitchfork, Steven Hyden praised the album's production and collaborative nature the recording process: "The Flower Lane is the latest progression for what now resembles a fully fledged group. Mondanile's hasn't tempered the echoes of his other band in Ducktails, but he isn't confined to Real Estate's shadow, either."

== Track listing ==
No.	Title	Length
1.	"Ivy Covered House"	3:29
2.	"The Flower Lane"	4:28
3.	"Under Cover"	6:09
4.	"Timothy Shy"	4:04
5.	"Planet Phrom"	3:30
6.	"Assistant Director"	3:54
7.	"Sedan Magic"	4:41
8.	"International Date Line"	1:58
9.	"Letter of Intent"	5:19
10.	"Academy Avenue"	2:49

== Personnel ==
=== Musicians ===
- Matt Mondanile – vocals, guitar, keyboards, drum machine, synth, percussion
- Ian Drennan – electric piano, synth, keyboards, saxophone, backing vocals
- Luka Usmiani – bass guitar
- Alex Craig – guitar, backing vocals
- Sam Franklin – drums, backing vocals, synth
- Joel Ford – bass, backing vocals
- Daniel Lopatin – synth
- Sam Mehran – guitar
- Martin Courtney – piano
- Madeline Follin – vocals (7)
- Jessa Farkas – vocals (9)
- Al Carlson – flute

=== Recording personnel ===
- Matt Mondanile – producer
- Al Carlson – producer, engineer, mixing
