= Jersey Devil (disambiguation) =

The Jersey Devil is a legendary creature of southern New Jersey.

Jersey Devil may also refer to:

- Jersey Devil (album), a 2017 album by Matt Mondanile under his pseudonym Ducktails
- Jersey Devil (video game), a 1997 3D platform game
- "The Jersey Devil" (The X-Files), a television episode
- Jersey Devil Coaster, a roller coaster at Six Flags Great Adventure
- Jersey Devils, a team in the Eastern Hockey League
- New Jersey Devils, a hockey team in the NHL
- "New Jersey Devil", a song by Ho99o9 on the album United States of Horror
- 177th Fighter Wing or Jersey Devils, a wing of the New Jersey Air National Guard
- Nu Jerzey Devil, rapper associated with The Black Wall Street Records
- Carny (2009 film), a Canadian television horror film also known as Jersey Devil
- Sonya Deville, professional wrestler and former mixed martial artist whose nickname is "The Jersey Devil"
