= Northern Highway =

Northern Highway may refer to:

- Northern Highway, Belize, also known as Philip Goldson Highway
- Northern Highway, Victoria, in Australia
- A1 autoroute (France), also known as the 'Northern Motorway'
- Great Northern Highway, Western Australia
- "Northern Highway" (song), by Martin Courtney, from the album Many Moons
- Circuito Norte, road in Cuba which roughly translates to Northern Circuit or Northern Highway
