= St. Catherine (album) =

Studio album by Ducktails
- Released: July 24, 2015
- Recorded: October 2013 – January 2015; Los Angeles, Berlin, New York City
- Genre: Indie rock, psychedelic pop
- Label: Domino
- Producer: Matt Mondanile, Rob Schnapf

Ducktails chronology
The Flower Lane (2013)	St. Catherine (2015)	Jersey Devil (2017)

Singles from St. Catherine
- 1. "Headbanging in the Mirror"; 2. "Surreal Exposure"

St. Catherine is the fifth studio album by the American indie rock act Ducktails, released on July 24, 2015, on Domino. Co-produced by primary recording artist Matt Mondanile and Rob Schnapf, the album features contributions from Julia Holter and her bandmates, Chris Votek and Andrew Tholl.

Influenced by Mondanile's decision to move from Brooklyn, New York to Los Angeles, California, St. Catherine features more personal lyrical content than previous Ducktails releases.

== Background and recording ==
The album was recorded between October 2013 and January 2015 in three cities; Los Angeles, Berlin and New York City, with primary recording artist Matt Mondanile noting: "It’s the longest I’ve spent on a record, and I moved to LA when I started it. I started demoing in 2013 in the fall, and then Real Estate’s record came out in March of 2014, so I started touring a lot and would work on it slowly over time. I was traveling a lot, and I’d just moved here, and I was taking my time with it and listening to a lot of the demos."

During the recording of St. Catherine, Mondanile was joined by producer Rob Schnapf in its final stages: "Rob helped mix it. When you work with someone else, you do what they think is best for the record. It's also nice to have your own input, but from a different place, I guess. I learned a little bit about mixing a record from Robb. He's just a good guy."

== Writing and composition ==
Regarding the album's lyrical content, Mondanile noted: "I was more interested in writing about actual things in my life. I wanted to be more specific with the songs, and write about something. Instead of the past, [where] it was more abstract."

The album and its title track are named after Catherine of Alexandria: "She's kind of like the Patron Saint of Knowledge and Virtue. Her story is that she saved herself for Jesus Christ, and she wouldn't sleep with anyone except for [him]. She saves her body for Jesus, and [that's] very interesting to me, for someone to devote their life to that. The song's about [being] satisfied with what you have and nothing else. You're kind of lost in the dream; or lost in the fantasy." The song Krumme Lanke is named after the lake Krumme Lanke in Berlin.

== Reception ==
In a mostly positive review for Pitchfork, Zach Kelly wrote: "This is Ducktails’ most discriminating and tasteful album, but the project is at its best when there's a certain amount of exploration even within its narrow parameters." In another mostly positive review, Spin's Harley Brown wrote: "St. Catherine lacks the homespun production that made Ducktails’ earlier recordings so charming, but it's still some of the most lovely indie rock music that exists today."

== Track listing ==
No.	Title	Length
1.	"The Disney Afternoon"	3:26
2.	"Headbanging in the Mirror"	3:34
3.	"Into the Sky"	3:34
4.	"Heaven's Room"	4:39
5.	"St. Catherine"	3:18
6.	"The Laughing Woman"	3:27
7.	"Interlude" (Digital-only track)	3:50
8.	"Surreal Exposure"	2:40
9.	"Church"	3:14
10.	"Medieval"	3:21
11.	"Krumme Lanke"	3:08
12.	"Reprise"	4:15

== Personnel ==
=== Musicians ===
- Matt Mondanile
- James Ferraro
- Ross Chait
- Julia Holter
- Andrew Tholl
- Chris Votek
- Josh da Costa
- Alex Craig
- Luka Usmiani

=== String arrangements ===
- Andrew Tholl
- Chris Votek

=== Production ===
- Rob Schnapf – producer, mixing
- Drew Fischer – engineer
- Matt Mondanile – producer
- Al Carlson – engineer
- Simon Berckelman – engineer

=== Artwork ===
- Rob Carmichael – design
- Rob Kulisek – back cover photo
