= The Main Thing =

The Main Thing may refer to:

- The Main Thing (Alsou album)
- The Main Thing (Real Estate album)
- "The Main Thing", a song by Roxy Music from the album Avalon
