= Northern Highway (song) =

Single by Martin Courtney

from the album Many Moons
- Released: September 2, 2015
- Genre: Indie rock; jangle pop; psychedelic pop
- Length: 4:01
- Label: Domino
- Songwriter(s): Martin Courtney
- Producer(s): Jarvis Taveniere

Martin Courtney singles chronology
"Vestiges" (2015)	"Northern Highway" (2015)	"Airport Bar" (2015)

"Northern Highway" is a song by American musician Martin Courtney, the frontman of the American indie rock band Real Estate, from his debut solo album, Many Moons. The song was released on September 2, 2015 along with the announcement of Many Moons and an accompanying music video.

== Track listing ==
No.	Title	Length
1.	"Northern Highway"	4:01

== Reception ==
"Northern Highway" received positive reviews from contemporary music critics. In his review of Many Moons, Marc Hogan of Pitchfork Media stated that "Northern Highway" "cruises along, suitably upbeat, as it balances existential questions ("Do you feel just like a stranger?") with the narrator's avowal that he could never retire to a place without seasons—all via a chiming arrangement befitting the Left Banke."

== Music video ==
Still picture from the "Northern Highway" video.

A video for "Northern Highway" was released on September 2, 2015. The video was directed by Rob Hatch-Miller and Puloma Basu of Production Company Productions in upstate New York. Zumic described the video with, "The no frills video sees Martin playing electric and acoustic guitars under highways, on railroad tracks, and in front of nondescript buildings, with occasional landscape shots thrown in."
