= Talking backwards =

Talking backwards may refer to:

- Ingressive speech, the process of talking while inhaling rather than exhaling
- "Talking Backwards", a 2014 song by Real Estate
