= Alex Bleeker =

American musician (born 1986)

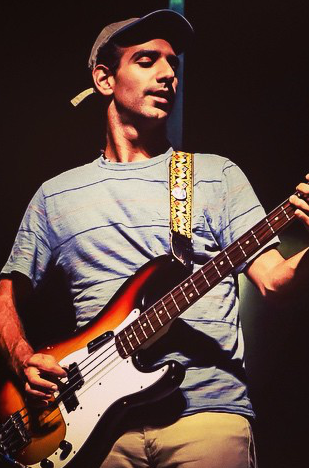
- Bleeker performing with Real Estate at Flying Dog Brewery in Frederick, Maryland in 2014

Background information
- Born: Alexander William Bleeker; July 28, 1986 (age 40); New Jersey, U.S.
- Genres: Indie rock; psychedelic rock; surf rock
- Instruments: Bass; guitar; vocals
- Years active: 2009–present
- Website: bleekerandthefreaks.blogspot.com

Alexander William Bleeker (born July 28, 1986) is an American musician. He is best known as the bassist and occasional lead vocalist of the indie rock band Real Estate, with whom he has recorded six studio albums. He is also the frontman and primary recording artist of the indie rock band Alex Bleeker and the Freaks, with who he has recorded three studio albums.

In 2024, Bleeker co-authored the book, Taste in Music: Eating on Tour with Indie Musicians, which was listed among Pitchfork's "Best Music Books of 2024."

== Early life and personal life ==
Bleeker was born in New Jersey and raised in Ridgewood, New Jersey. He attended Ridgewood High School with two of his Real Estate bandmates, Martin Courtney and Matt Mondanile. After graduating from high school, he studied at Bennington College in Bennington, Vermont. Bleeker currently resides in Bolinas, California.

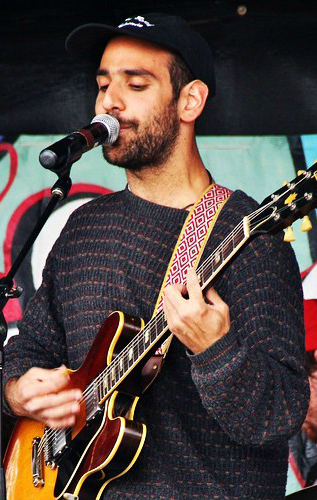
Bleeker performing with Alex Bleeker and the Freaks at Saylestock in Ridgewood, New Jersey in 2015

== Discography ==
with Real Estate

- Real Estate (2009)
- Days (2011)
- Atlas (2014)
- In Mind (2017)
- The Main Thing (2020)
- Daniel (2024)

with Alex Bleeker and the Freaks

- Alex Bleeker and the Freaks (2009)
- How Far Away (2013)
- Country Agenda (2015)

Solo

- These Days (7" Group Tightener, 2010)
- From the Archives Vol. 1 (7" Modern Country Records, 2011)
- Heaven On The Faultline (Night Bloom Records, 2021)
