= Landscapes (Ducktails album) =

Studio album by Ducktails
- Released: August 6, 2009
- Label: Olde English Spelling Bee

Ducktails chronology
Ducktails (2009)	Landscapes (2009)	Ducktails III: Arcade Dynamics (2011)

Landscapes is the second studio album by the American recording act Ducktails, released on August 6, 2009 on Olde English Spelling Bee. The album was recorded entirely by Matt Mondanile, and was the second full-length Ducktails album to be released in 2009.

== Artwork ==
Regarding the album's artwork, Mondanile noted: "[It has] this purple palm tree imagery, kind of two images, it’s kind of just like: each of my record covers I want to be pop art that goes along with the record. Cartoon to pop. That’s kind of my style. Taking that and seeing what you can do with it to make it weird."

== Reception ==
Professional ratings
Review scores
Source	Rating
Fact Magazine	(positive)
Pitchfork	7.3/10

Fact Magazine characterized Landscapes as a series of "soft-focus aural polaroids," calling it "a breathtakingly pretty album" whose "sense of place is open and plural: it can conjure or complement whatever landscape you will it to, from a verdant forest to a sun-scorched desert; from an overcrowded city to an empty beach." In a positive review for Pitchfork, David Bevan praised Matt Mondanile's layered recording techniques, writing: "Landscapes is rarely anything but engaging. "Wishes" in particular is a slacker standout more harmonically rich, more sweetly and appropriately lonesome than anything else here."

== Track listing ==
No.	Title	Length
1.	"On the Boardwalk"	4:30
2.	"Landrunner"	2:51
3.	"Roses"	3:37
4.	"Welcome Home (I'm Back)"	3:16
5.	"Deck Observatory"	5:48
6.	"Spring"	2:59
7.	"Oh, Magnolia Tree"	2:23
8.	"Wishes"	3:40
9.	"Seagull's Flight"	6:03
10.	"House of Mirrors"	5:54
