= Ducktails (album) =

Studio album by Ducktails
- Released: May 11, 2009
- Length: 39:01
- Label: Not Not Fun

Ducktails chronology
Ducktails (2009)	Landscapes (2009)

Ducktails is the self-titled debut studio album by American recording project Ducktails, released on May 11, 2009 on Not Not Fun. The album is the first of two full-length albums released in 2009, with Landscapes following three months later.

== Artwork ==
Regarding the album's artwork, Matt Mondanile noted: "The first record – all those stripes – that’s this artist in Finland named Jan Anderzen. He makes this insane-o music, but I was super into his art for a long time. He just makes these crazy paintings. I always want artists to do things."

== Reception ==
Professional ratings
Review scores
Source	Rating
AllMusic	3.5/5 stars

In a positive review, Allmusic's Jesse Jarnow wrote: "perhaps the most productive way to think of Mondanile's work is as beach-time ambience, like Boards of Canada, should they choose to roam the vast Jersey Shore of the mind instead of their own icy wastes.

== Track listing ==
No.	Title	Length
1.	"Backyard"	1:38
2.	"Beach Point Pleasant"	4:58
3.	"Pizza Time"	2:35
4.	"Horizon"	2:55
5.	"Friends"	3:29
6.	"Dancing with the One You Love"	3:10
7.	"Gem"	3:13
8.	"Daily Vacation"	3:38
9.	"The Mall"	2:22
10.	"Surf's Up"	11:08
