= Reality (Real Estate EP) =

EP by Real Estate
- Released: December 18, 2009
- Recorded: 2008–2009
- Genre: Indie rock
- Length: 23:59
- Language: English
- Label: Mexican Summer

Real Estate chronology
Real Estate (2009)	Reality (2009)	Days (2011)

Reality is the second EP by American indie rock band Real Estate, released on December 18, 2009, on Mexican Summer.

All the songs were recorded on a cassette 8-track in Jersey City, New Jersey, except "Saturday Morning," which was recorded in Ridgewood, New Jersey.

== Critical reception ==
Professional ratings
Review scores
Source	Rating
Pitchfork	7.5/10

Reality received acclaim from contemporary music critics. Pitchfork Media's David Bevan gave the album a 7.5 out of 10, writing that "Real Estate songs are often mood pieces, and this set sounds much more the product of a melancholy young man ruminating on his own than any group trip to the beach."

== Track listing ==
No.	Title	Length
1.	"Motorbikes"	2:11
2.	"Basement"	5:11
3.	"Drum"	2:38
4.	"Saturday Morning"	2:55
5.	"Younger than Yesterday"	4:32
6.	"Dumb Luck"	6:32
Total length:		23:59
