= Many Moons (album) =

Studio album by Martin Courtney
- Released: October 30, 2015
- Recorded: 2012–2015
- Studios: Rear House; Thump Studios; (Brooklyn, New York)
- Genres: Indie rock; jangle pop; psychedelic pop
- Length: 37:18
- Language: English
- Label: Domino
- Producer: Jarvis Taveniere

Singles from Many Moons
- 1. "Vestiges" Released: August 6, 2015; 2. "Northern Highway" Released: September 2, 2015; 3. "Airport Bar" Released: October 12, 2015

Deluxe vinyl cover
- Includes Courtney's initials, "MCIV", embossed on the front cover

Many Moons is the debut solo album by Martin Courtney, the frontman of the American indie rock band Real Estate, released on October 30, 2015, on Domino Records.

== Background and recording ==
The material for Many Moons began as a stress-relief outlet for Courtney ahead of the recording of Real Estate's 2014 album Atlas. Woods' Jarvis Taveniere had access to a studio ahead of the recording sessions for Atlas and asked Courtney to make a single. According to Courtney, the session snowballed into five songs they thought would become an EP. After they had even more songs completed, Courtney and Taveniere decided to release a full album once the recording and touring for Atlas were complete. The album's material accrued sporadically between 2013 and 2015.

Courtney and Taveniere play on Many Moons alongside Julian Lynch and Real Estate's Matt Kallman. Courtney has stated that it ended up as a solo album only because he couldn't think of a band name he was satisfied with for Taveniere and himself.

Many Moons was recorded at Rear House and Thump Studios in Brooklyn, New York, with Taveniere producing. It was subsequently mastered by Timothy Stollenwerk at Stereophonic Mastering in Portland, Oregon.

== Music and lyrics ==
Courtney's marriage to his fiancée Heather Joyce Courtney in October 2012 and the birth of their daughter contribute to the album's themes of Courtney's transition into family life and fatherhood.

== Release and promotion ==
The album's deluxe vinyl was released as a limited edition of 500 coke bottle clear vinyl LPs.

A video for the album's second single "Northern Highway" was released on September 2, 2015. The video was directed by Rob Hatch-Miller and Puloma Basu of Production Company Productions in upstate New York. Zumic described the video with, "The no frills video sees Martin playing electric and acoustic guitars under highways, on railroad tracks, and in front of nondescript buildings, with occasional landscape shots thrown in."

For his touring band, Courtney recruited Taveniere and Aaron Neveu, both of whom were main contributors in the album sessions, on bass and drums, respectively. For guitar, none of Courtney's many guitar-playing acquaintances were available. The position was eventually filled by singer-songwriter Doug Keith, whom Courtney had never met before. Keith was recommended for the job because he also played guitar for Sharon van Etten, who was under the same management with Real Estate.

== Critical reception ==
Professional ratings
Aggregate scores
Source	Rating
Metacritic	75/100
Review scores
Source	Rating
AllMusic	4/5 stars
Consequence of Sound	B
DIY	4/5 stars
Drowned in Sound	7/10
Exclaim!	8/10
The Guardian	4/5 stars
Mojo	4/5 stars
musicOMH	3/5 stars
Pitchfork	(7.0/10)
Rolling Stone	3/5 stars

Many Moons received large acclaim from contemporary music critics. At Metacritic, which assigns a normalized rating out of 100 to reviews from mainstream critics, the album received an average score of 75, based on 16 reviews, which indicates "generally favorable reviews".

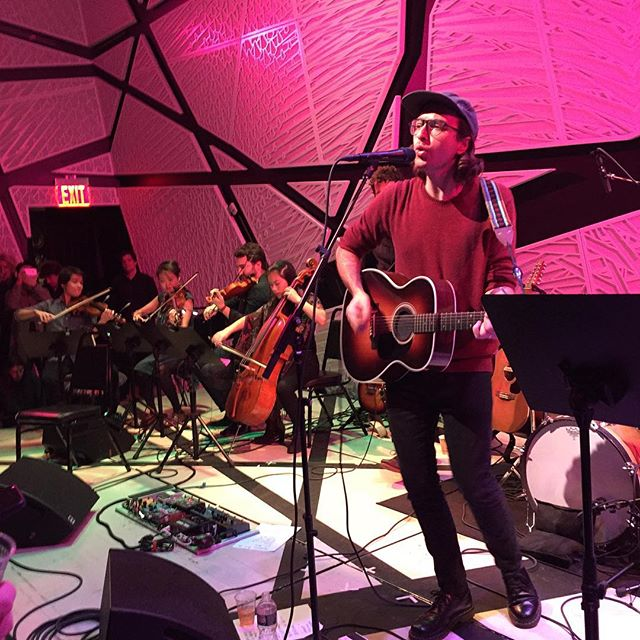
Courtney performing during the release performance for Many Moons at National Sawdust in Brooklyn in 2015.

Marc Hogan of Pitchfork Media gave the album a 7.0 out of 10, exclaiming, "Many Moons works as a remarkably cohesive album, meandering its way across themes of past and present to a state of aching clarity that's modest, but no less genuine for it."

Dave Mix of Exclaim! praised the album for its simplicity, stating, "Many Moons is another deceptively simple, cohesive statement from an artist who is becoming more accomplished with each release. Martin Courtney has expanded, however slightly, on the Real Estate sound while continuing to find beauty in the seemingly mundane."

Jonathan Bernstein of Rolling Stone gave the album three out of five stars, stating, "As a vocalist, Courtney equally evokes Kurt Vile's listlessness and Doug Martsch's heroic exhaustion, switching from detached indie drawl to earnest rocker croon from one song to the next." Bernstein was more critical of the album expressing that, "The Brooklyn-based singer is an expert arranger and song craftsman, if only an adequate lyricist: He trades in plenty of pop/rock cliches, which can work well – but when Courtney sings lines like, "We're not the same as who we were/Doesn't matter anymore," it's unclear if he's toying around with recycled images of young-adult malaise or simply passing them off as original profundity of his own. At its best, though, Courtney's solo debut is a big-hearted reflection on time, memory and innocence that makes growing up sound every bit as scary as it is."

Collin Brennan of Consequence of Sound gave the album a favorable review, stating that, "In the end, Many Moons appears exactly as advertised: an album that showcases many different faces of the same essential thing. These songs won’t spark any revelations with their musings on time and the subconscious, but they might just transport you to a place that feels like a pleasant dream — a place between places, if you will, like the titular locale of closer “Airport Bar”. It's a place that values reflection over action, a place where figuring it all out just takes time, and time is limitless. Let's call this place the suburbs of the human mind."

== Track listing ==
All tracks are written by Martin Courtney.

No.	Title	Length
1.	"Awake"	4:02
2.	"Foto"	4:31
3.	"Vestiges"	4:58
4.	"Before We Begin"	3:50
5.	"Northern Highway"	4:01
6.	"Many Moons"	2:36
7.	"Asleep"	2:43
8.	"Little Blue"	3:24
9.	"Focus"	3:17
10.	"Airport Bar"	3:56
Total length:		37:18

== Personnel ==
Credits adapted from the liner notes of Many Moons.

Main personnel

- Martin Courtney – vocals (tracks 1–5, 7–9), acoustic guitar (tracks 1–10), twelve-string guitar (tracks 3, 9, 10), organ (tracks 7, 9), electric guitar (tracks 1, 5–7), drums (track 1)
- Jarvis Taveniere – bass (tracks 1–6, 8–10), electric guitar (track 8), bass guitar (track 7)
- Julian Lynch – electric guitar (track 7), organ (track 7), vocals (track 7)
- Matt Kallman – organ (tracks 1, 10), piano (tracks 1, 4), keyboards (track 4)
- Aaron Neveu – drums (tracks 2–9)

Additional personnel

- Michael Stasiak – drums (track 10)
- Jake Chabot – flute (tracks 5, 6)
- Matthew Sinno – viola (tracks 3–6)
- Patrick Hopkins – cello (tracks 3–6)
- Jonathan Miron – violin (tracks 3–6)
- Greg Cardi – violin (tracks 4–6)
- Samara Lubelski – violin (tracks 2, 7)
