= Jersey Devil (album) =

Studio album by Ducktails
- Released: October 6, 2017
- Length: 38:11
- Label: New Images

Ducktails chronology
St. Catherine (2015)	Jersey Devil (2017)	Watercolors (2019)

Professional ratings
Aggregate scores
Source	Rating
Metacritic	72/100
Review scores
Source	Rating
AllMusic	3.5/5 stars
DIY	4/5 stars
The Line of Best Fit	8/10

Jersey Devil is the sixth studio album by American musician Matt Mondanile under his pseudonym Ducktails. It was released on October 6, 2017, through New Images.

== Track listing ==
No.	Title	Length
1.	"Map to the Stars"	3:22
2.	"Light a Candle"	3:45
3.	"In the Hallway"	3:47
4.	"Keeper of the Garden"	3:20
5.	"Solitary Star"	3:58
6.	"Lover"	3:24
7.	"Mannequin"	3:32
8.	"Wearing a Mask"	4:50
9.	"Shattered Mirror Travel"	3:53
10.	"The Rising Sun"	4:20
