= Talking Backwards =

Single by Real Estate

from the album Atlas
- B-side: "Beneath the Dunes"
- Released: January 14, 2014
- Recorded: 2013
- Studio: Magic Shop, New York City
- Genre: Indie rock; jangle pop; psychedelic pop; surf rock; country rock
- Length: 3:07
- Label: Domino
- Songwriter(s): Martin Courtney
- Producer(s): Tom Schick

Real Estate singles chronology
"Easy" (2011)	"Talking Backwards" (2014)	"Crime" (2014)

"Talking Backwards" is a song by American indie rock band Real Estate. The song was released on January 14, 2014, through Domino Recording Company, as the lead single from their third studio album Atlas. "Talking Backwards" explores miscommunication, and how distance and separation affect relationships. It was written by frontman Martin Courtney, who was newly married at the time and based it on long stretches on the road touring. The song was produced by Tom Schick and recorded at Magic Shop in New York. The song received widely positive reviews from critics.

== Background ==
Martin Courtney wrote the song about miscommunication in relationships, and how long stretches away only complicate matters. "There’s the cliché that communication is a big part of a relationship, which obviously rings true for anyone who has been in a long-term relationship," he told Stereogum. He had written the song after a lengthy stint touring with Real Estate, and in dreadful anticipation of having to do so again. In the song, Courtney, who was newly married at the time of its writing, depicts a lingering and lonely phone call: "We can talk for hours / but the line is still engaged / we’re not getting any closer / you’re too many miles away."

Ten years after the song's release, the band issued a demo version as a part of the Bandcamp-only compilation Good Music To Lift Los Angeles.

== Music video ==
The song's music video was filmed by Charles Poekel and edited by Uprising Creative. It features clips of the band in the studio. Zachary Lipez of Vice eviscerated the clip: "Real Estate's video for "Talking Backwards" is three minutes and 11 seconds of hazy nostalgia for the halcyon days of... well, when they made the video for their song, "Talking Backwards". It's basically "We're An American Band" for people too smart to ever do anything fun."

== Reception ==
The song was released online on January 14, 2014 along with the announcement of Atlas. The single was released as a 7" on Domino Records with "Beneath the Dunes" as its B-side on February 24, 2014. The band promoted the single with an appearance on Late Show with David Letterman.

"Talking Backwards" received positive reviews from contemporary music critics. Pitchfork gave it their "Best New Track" designation, with Larry Fitzmaurice writing: "From the chiming six-string interplay that opens the song to Martin Courtney's benevolent, honeyed vocals, all the elements are in place to cement "Talking Backwards" as another indelible Real Estate song, a testament to the band owning their lane as a truly exceptional guitar-focused group at a time when truly exceptional guitar-focused groups are in short supply." NPR named it their song of the week, with Stephen Thompson likening it to a "sunbeam shooting through the clouds." Dan Weiss from Spin found it "well-crafted," while the Boston Globe's David Brusie felt it "recall[ed] the poppy, punchy Real Estate that wowed critics when the band burst on the scene in 2009."

Rolling Stone dubbed it one of the best songs of its year, as did Time, with writer Jamieson Cox commenting: "A meditation on disconnection, memory, and maturity, it’s proof that getting older doesn’t have to mean becoming boring."

== Track listing ==
No.	Title	Length
1.	"Talking Backwards"	3:07
2.	"Beneath the Dunes"	3:47
