= Real Estate (album) =

Studio album by Real Estate
- Released: November 17, 2009
- Recorded: 2008–2009
- Studio: Rear House (Brooklyn, New York), Yeah Buddy HQ (Glen Rock, New Jersey) Various locations: (The Heights, Jersey City); (Ridgewood, New Jersey)
- Genre: Indie rock; psychedelic pop; surf rock; lo-fi; dream pop
- Length: 39:14
- Label: Woodsist
- Producer: Real Estate

Real Estate chronology
Real Estate (2009)	Reality (2009)

Real Estate is the debut album by American indie rock band Real Estate, released on November 17, 2009 on Woodsist.

== Background ==
Future Real Estate founders Martin Courtney, Matt Mondanile and Alex Bleeker had already played music together in various permutations as students at Ridgewood High School in Ridgewood, New Jersey. While studying in different colleges, they kept in touch and would send each other songs that they had worked on individually. Courtney's demos were impressive enough to inspire them to form another band after graduating and returning home to Ridgewood in 2008. They were joined on drums by Etienne Pierre Duguay, who had formed a band called Predator Vision with Mondanile in Northampton and also played with Mondanile, Courtney and Bleeker as the backing band for Julian Lynch. The quartet jammed in the basement of Courtney's parents' house, and when Bleeker moved to Philadelphia, the other three continued working on music. Eventually Bleeker returned, and after playing guitar since high school, he was asked to play bass to make it easier to sing for Courtney, who had played bass throughout high school and had recently picked up guitar to write songs.

== Recording ==
Most of Real Estate's debut album was recorded from January until June 2009 at Yeah Buddy HQ in Glen Rock, New Jersey, a studio operated by the band's childhood friend Sarim "Sam" Al-Rawi. "Suburban Dogs" was recorded at Courtney's mother's house, while "Fake Blues" was recorded at Courtney's apartment.

== Artwork ==
The artwork for the album comes from Italian architect Paolo Soleri's model for his 'Hexahedron City', from his 1969 book Arcology: The City in the Image of Man published by the MIT Press. The book details Soleri's architectural concept arcology, a vision of architectural design principles for very densely populated habitats.

== Critical reception ==
Professional ratings
Aggregate scores
Source	Rating
Metacritic	79/100
Review scores
Source	Rating
AllMusic	4/5 stars
Pitchfork	8.5/10
’’PopMatters’’	9/10
Tiny Mix Tapes	4/5 marks

Real Estate received largely positive reviews from contemporary music critics. At Metacritic, which assigns a normalized rating out of 100 to reviews from mainstream critics, the album received an average score of 79, based on 15 reviews, which indicates "generally favorable reviews". Pitchfork labeled it "Best New Music".

== Track listing ==
All tracks are written by Martin Courtney, except where noted.

No.	Title	Writer(s)	Length
1.	"Beach Comber"		4:29
2.	"Pool Swimmers"		3:16
3.	"Suburban Dogs"		4:36
4.	"Black Lake"		3:30
5.	"Atlantic City"	Matthew Mondanile	1:50
6.	"Fake Blues"		3:41
7.	"Green River"		2:40
8.	"Suburban Beverage"		6:10
9.	"Let's Rock the Beach"	Mondanile	4:42
10.	"Snow Days"		4:23
Total length:			39:14

== Personnel ==
- Martin Courtney – vocals (except tracks 5 and 9), guitar, bass (tracks 3, 4, 6, 7 and 8), drums (tracks 4 and 8), percussion (track 7)
- Matthew Mondanile – guitar (except tracks 4, 6, 7, 10), SK-5 (tracks 2 and 3)
- Alex Bleeker – bass (tracks 1, 2, 5, 9 and 10), percussion (track 5)
- Etienne Pierre Duguay – drums (tracks 1, 2, 5, 6, 9, 10), bongos (track 2)
