= DuckTales =

DuckTales may refer to:

== Film and television ==
- DuckTales (1987 TV series), animated TV series
- DuckTales the Movie: Treasure of the Lost Lamp, 1990 American animated film
- DuckTales (2017 TV series), animated TV series; a reboot of the 1987 series

== Video games ==
- DuckTales (video game), 1989 platform game
  - DuckTales: Remastered, 2013 remake game
- DuckTales 2, 1993 platform game
- DuckTales: The Quest for Gold, 1990 platform game
- DuckTales: Scrooge's Loot, 2013 mobile game

== See also ==
- Category:DuckTales
- Template:DuckTales
