= The Main Thing (Real Estate album) =

Studio album by Real Estate
- Released: February 28, 2020
- Genre: Indie rock
- Length: 52:26
- Label: Domino Records
- Producer: Kevin McMahon

Real Estate chronology
In Mind (2017)	The Main Thing (2020)	Daniel (2024)

Singles from In Mind
- 1. "Paper Cup" Released: January 15, 2020; 2. "The Main Thing" Released: February 24, 2020

Professional ratings
Aggregate scores
Source	Rating
Metacritic	77/100
Review scores
Source	Rating
AllMusic	4/5 stars
Clash	7/10
DIY	3/5 stars
Exclaim!	8/10
The Line of Best Fit	7/10
NME	4/5 stars
The Observer	2/5 stars
Paste	8/10
Pitchfork	7.3/10

The Main Thing is the fifth studio album by the American indie rock band Real Estate, released on February 28, 2020 on Domino Records. The album was produced by Kevin McMahon, who had previously worked with the band on their second album, Days (2011).

The album's release was preceded by the singles, "Paper Cup" and "The Main Thing".

== Background ==
Primary songwriter Martin Courtney began writing The Main Thing while touring in support of the band's previous album, In Mind, in 2017. During the process, Courtney initially had anxieties about whether Real Estate should continue: "My wife was pregnant through a lot of the process of writing this record. So, just on the level of, is this a responsible thing to do, to be a guy in an indie-rock band. I was really struggling with that, and also feeling like, the world is kind of in a bad state." Courtney's love of being a member of the band ultimately led him to continue working on new material: "Maybe it’s better to set an example to do what you love for those around you. That was something that I found kind of inspiring."

As a result, the band entered the studio with a renewed sense of focus: "We knew we’d been a band for ten years, and this is our fifth record, and it kind of felt almost like do or die."

== Recording ==
To record the album, the band worked with Producer Kevin McMahon, who they had previously worked with on their second studio album, Days (2011): "We were in this old barn that was covered with old musical gear—old, broken things in states of disrepair. [...] He’s just got all kinds of stuff like that. There are wires everywhere and pictures torn out of magazines. I feel like it’s a little bit of a glimpse into Kevin. There’s a method to his madness."

McMahon pushed the band to make meaningful artistic decisions in the studio: "He would come up to you and be like, 'Why are you doing that?' Whatever it was, guitar part or examining a line in the lyrics or something, and just being like, 'Is there a reason for this? I’m not making a judgment call on whether I like it or not, but as long as you’re thinking about it and you’re not just falling into old habits.'"

== Writing and composition ==
Regarding the album's themes, Martin Courtney noted, "It’s an idea of life becoming more complex as you get older." Courtney was also influenced by his three children: "There’s definitely this feeling of wanting to shelter them. That heart-breaking realisation that they will have to grapple someday with the things we’re grappling with now. And also realising, I’m a grown-up now! And we have to grapple with that shit."

Courtney was also influenced by the concept of memory: "Maybe we’re cutting into what’s flawed about nostalgia. You look back on your past with these rose-coloured glasses, and there’s a tendency to smooth over the deeply complex history of it."

The song, "Also a But" is the band's first to be primarily written by and feature lead vocals from guitarist Julian Lynch; while "Sting" was written by keyboardist Matt Kallman. Bass guitarist Alex Bleaker praised Courtney for opening up the band's songwriting process: "I have to give props to Martin for relinquishing this feeling of, 'I wrote it though!' Those are the things that make us grow and make the music better, or at least different. Because being in band is crazy. In a way it’s like a romantic relationship. It’s complicated, and there’s tension."

The band were collectively inspired by the Roxy Music album Avalon (1982) during the recording process: "The name of our album is a nod to one of the songs on that record. Just in terms of production and the sounds, with the way that album feels really open and the ambient sections between songs, we were aspiring at least in one sense to do that on this record." Courtney attributes much of the album's sound and overall atmosphere to keyboardist Matt Kallman: "I think it came out in some of the choices Matt made in terms of synth sounds and stuff like that."

== Track listing ==
All tracks are written by Real Estate.

The Main Thing track listing
No.	Title	Length
1.	"Friday"	4:56
2.	"Paper Cup"	4:30
3.	"Gone"	3:13
4.	"You"	3:52
5.	"November"	2:22
6.	"Falling Down"	4:31
7.	"Also a But"	5:23
8.	"The Main Thing"	2:35
9.	"Shallow Sun"	4:14
10.	"Sting"	1:50
11.	"Silent World"	4:42
12.	"Procession"	3:20
13.	"Brother"	2:55
Total length:		52:26

The Main Thing – Japanese edition (bonus track)
No.	Title	Length
14.	"You" (Live in Chicago 2019)
