= Sinna Nasseri =

American Photographer

Sinna Nasseri (born in Los Angeles, CA) is an American photographer. His work focuses on documentary photography and portraiture, and it appears frequently in the New York Times and Vogue.

== Early life and education ==
Nasseri attended Fordham University School of Law. Until 2017, Nasseri was a lawyer for Latham & Watkins. Born in Los Angeles, he is of Iranian descent.

== Work ==
In 2020, eight of Nasseri’s photo essays were published by Vogue documenting the ways Americans responded to the COVID-19 pandemic, the Black Lives Matter movement, and the 2020 presidential election. In 2021, Nasseri’s photographs of a Stop the Steal rally in Arizona were used in the second impeachment trial of Donald Trump. In 2022, Nasseri was commissioned by Vogue to photograph the Met Gala, themed “In America: An Anthology of Fashion.” In 2023, New York Times published Nasseri’s “Plane Spotters” photo series.

The New York Times’s article “2023 in Retrospect: 59 Photographs That Defined the Year in Arts” included six photographs by Nasseri. Images included portraits of Michelle Williams, Henry Diltz, and John Stamos, documentation of the Oscar Nominees Luncheon, and the “Plane Spotters” photo series.

The Guardian’s article “The photographs that defined 2023 – and the stories behind them” included Nasseri’s documentation of Burning Man.
