= Days (Real Estate album) =

Studio album by Real Estate
- Released: October 18, 2011
- Studios: Marcata Recording (New Paltz, New York), Rear House (Brooklyn, New York)
- Genres: Indie rock; indie pop; jangle pop; dream pop
- Length: 41:25
- Label: Domino
- Producers: Kevin McMahon, Jarvis Taveniere

Real Estate chronology
Real Estate (2009)	Days (2011)	Atlas (2014)

Days is the second studio album by American indie rock band Real Estate, released on October 18, 2011, on Domino Records.

== Background ==
The album was recorded over the course of five months in a remote New Paltz, New York barn with Kevin McMahon as the producer, except for Out of Tune, which was recorded by Jarvis Taveniere at Rear House in Brooklyn, New York. The album was subsequently mastered by Greg Calbi at Sterling Sound in New York City.

A video for the lead track "Easy" was released through Funny or Die and directed by Tom Scharpling.

== Artwork ==
The artwork for the album uses a 1966 photograph entitled "Row of New Tract Houses," which features a tract housing in Bayonne, New Jersey. The photograph is from conceptual artist Dan Graham's 1967 photographic collection Homes for America.

== Critical reception ==
Professional ratings
Aggregate scores
Source	Rating
AnyDecentMusic?	7.5/10
Metacritic	77/100
Review scores
Source	Rating
AllMusic	3.5/5 stars
The A.V. Club	A
Entertainment Weekly	B+
The Guardian	3/5 stars
Mojo	4/5 stars
NME	7/10
Pitchfork	8.7/10
Q	4/5 stars
Rolling Stone	3/5 stars
Spin	7/10

Days received largely positive reviews from contemporary music critics. At Metacritic, which assigns a normalized rating out of 100 to reviews from mainstream critics, the album received an average score of 77, based on 32 reviews, which indicates "generally favorable reviews". Pitchfork labeled it "Best New Music".

The album was recognized as #13 on The 100 Best Albums of the Decade So Far list by Pitchfork in August 2014.

On their "Top 50 Albums of 2011" lists, Pitchfork placed it at number 9, Q and Uncut placed it at number 24, and Paste placed it at number 47.

== Track listing ==
All tracks are written by Martin Courtney, except where noted.

No.	Title	Writer(s)	Length
1.	"Easy"		3:53
2.	"Green Aisles"		5:01
3.	"It's Real"		2:48
4.	"Kinder Blumen"	Matthew Mondanile	3:55
5.	"Out of Tune"		4:51
6.	"Municipality"		3:36
7.	"Wonder Years"	Alex Bleeker	2:34
8.	"Three Blocks"		3:18
9.	"Younger than Yesterday"		4:08
10.	"All the Same"		7:21
Total length:			41:25
