= Atlas (Real Estate album) =

Studio album by Real Estate
- Released: March 4, 2014
- Recorded: June–November 2013
- Studios: The Loft, Chicago; Magic Shop, New York City
- Genres: Indie rock; jangle pop; dream pop
- Length: 38:18
- Label: Domino
- Producer: Tom Schick

Real Estate chronology
Days (2011)	Atlas (2014)	In Mind (2017)

Singles from Atlas
- 1. "Talking Backwards" Released: January 14, 2014; 2. "Crime" Released: February 20, 2014; 3. "Had to Hear" Released: August 25, 2014

Atlas is the third studio album by the American indie rock band Real Estate, released on March 4, 2014, on Domino Records. It was their first album recorded with the drummer Jackson Pollis and keyboard player Matt Kallman, and the last with the lead guitarist and founding member Matt Mondanile.

== Background ==
After touring for the album Days was finished, in late 2012 Real Estate took a break. While guitarist Mondanile and bass guitarist Alex Bleeker worked on their respective solo projects, lead singer and guitarist Martin Courtney married and was busy writing songs, which was something that he had started while touring. The band then spent winter and spring working on songs, taking up a total of eight to nine months on songwriting before recording commenced. In mid-2012 and throughout 2013, the band featured new material in their shows.

A friend of Real Estate suggested the album be produced by Jim O'Rourke, an idea which intrigued the band since they were fans of his work on Wilco's seminal album Yankee Hotel Foxtrot, and felt that his production style would fit with the "clean record" that they wanted to make. As the band was certain that working together would be unlikely given O'Rourke's enigmatic nature, their label proposed working with Tom Schick instead. Schick had co-produced Wilco's most recent album, The Whole Love, and was also the house engineer at The Loft, Wilco's studio in Chicago, Illinois. Since Wilco would be on tour, they gave Real Estate permission to record at the studio and use their gear, the first time for any band without Wilco's presence.

After mostly recording Days as a three-piece of Courtney, Mondanile and Bleeker, the addition of drummer Jackson Pollis – who had played with Real Estate since 2011 – enabled them to record basic tracks live as opposed to overdubbing tracks one by one. Before recording started, the band decided to add more sophisticated keyboard parts to be played by someone more proficient. Jonah Maurer, who joined Real Estate along with Pollis for the Days tour and performed several of the new songs live during his time in the band, had moved on to join Titus Andronicus. As a result, they recruited Matt Kallman, formerly of Girls, and had him write his own parts with a little direction. At one point, Wilco leader Jeff Tweedy visited the studio to witness the band recording several takes of a song that received glowing enthusiasm from him, but ultimately did not make the album.

The album was recorded over the summer and fall of 2013 at The Loft in Chicago and the Magic Shop in New York City. The album was also mixed at the Magic Shop. The album was subsequently mastered by Greg Calbi at Sterling Sound in New York City with the bonus tracks being mastered by Joe Lambert at Joe Lambert Mastering.

== Artwork ==
The artwork for the album comes from a mural painted by the Polish artist Stefan Knapp for the former department store chain Alexander's in Paramus, New Jersey.

The mural has since been disassembled following the close of Alexander's and the Bergen Museum of Art & Science's purchase of the mural. There were local efforts to find a location large enough for its display, including at the former Xanadu complex in East Rutherford. However, the mural was only temporarily put on display in Paterson, New Jersey, at the Art Factory in 2015. In 2021, it was announced that the Valley Hospital in Paramus would become the permanent home of the mural, with sections of it on public display upon the hospital's opening in April 2024.

== Reception ==
Professional ratings
Aggregate scores
Source	Rating
AnyDecentMusic?	7.4/10
Metacritic	78/100
Review scores
Source	Rating
AllMusic	5/5 stars
The A.V. Club	C+
The Guardian	4/5 stars
Mojo	4/5 stars
NME	8/10
The Observer	4/5 stars
Pitchfork	8.8/10
Q	4/5 stars
Rolling Stone	3.5/5 stars
Spin	7/10

Atlas received widespread acclaim from contemporary music critics. At Metacritic, which assigns a normalized rating out of 100 to reviews from mainstream critics, the album received an average score of 78, based on 33 reviews, which indicates "generally favorable reviews". The album was recognized as one of The 100 Best Albums of the Decade So Far by Pitchfork in August 2014.

The album debuted at number 34 on the Billboard Top 200 chart.

== Track listing ==
All tracks are written by Martin Courtney, except where noted.

Atlas track listing
No.	Title	Writer(s)	Length
1.	"Had to Hear"		4:51
2.	"Past Lives"		4:33
3.	"Talking Backwards"		3:08
4.	"April's Song"	Matthew Mondanile	3:32
5.	"The Bend"		5:12
6.	"Crime"	Martin Courtney, Matthew Mondanile	3:16
7.	"Primitive"		4:15
8.	"How Might I Live"	Alex Bleeker	2:28
9.	"Horizon"		3:11
10.	"Navigator"		3:36
Total length:			38:18

Deluxe LP edition
No.	Title	Length
11.	"The Chancellor"	3:47
12.	"Recreation"	3:44
Total length:		45:49

== Personnel ==
- Martin Courtney – vocals, guitar
- Matt Mondanile – acoustic and electric guitars
- Alex Bleeker – bass guitar, vocals on "How Might I Live"
- Jackson Pollis – drums and percussion
- Matt Kallman – keyboards
- Julian Lynch – clarinet

Technical

- Tom Schick – engineering, mixing and production
- Mark Greenberg – assistant engineering
- Alex Nappi – assistant mixing
- Kabir Hermon – assistant mixing
- Greg Calbi – mastering

Design

- Rob Carmichael – graphic design
- Irmgard Carpenter – photography
- Shawn Brackbill – photography
- Charles Poekel – photography

== Charts ==
Chart performance for Atlas
Chart (2014)	Peak position
Australian Albums (ARIA)	66
Belgian Albums (Ultratop Flanders)	73
Belgian Albums (Ultratop Wallonia)	172
Dutch Albums (Album Top 100)	67
Irish Albums (IRMA)	36
Scottish Albums (Official Charts)	60
UK Albums (Official Charts)	43
UK Independent Albums (Official Charts)	7
US Billboard 200	34
US Independent Albums (Billboard)	6
