= Ducktails (musical project) =

American music project

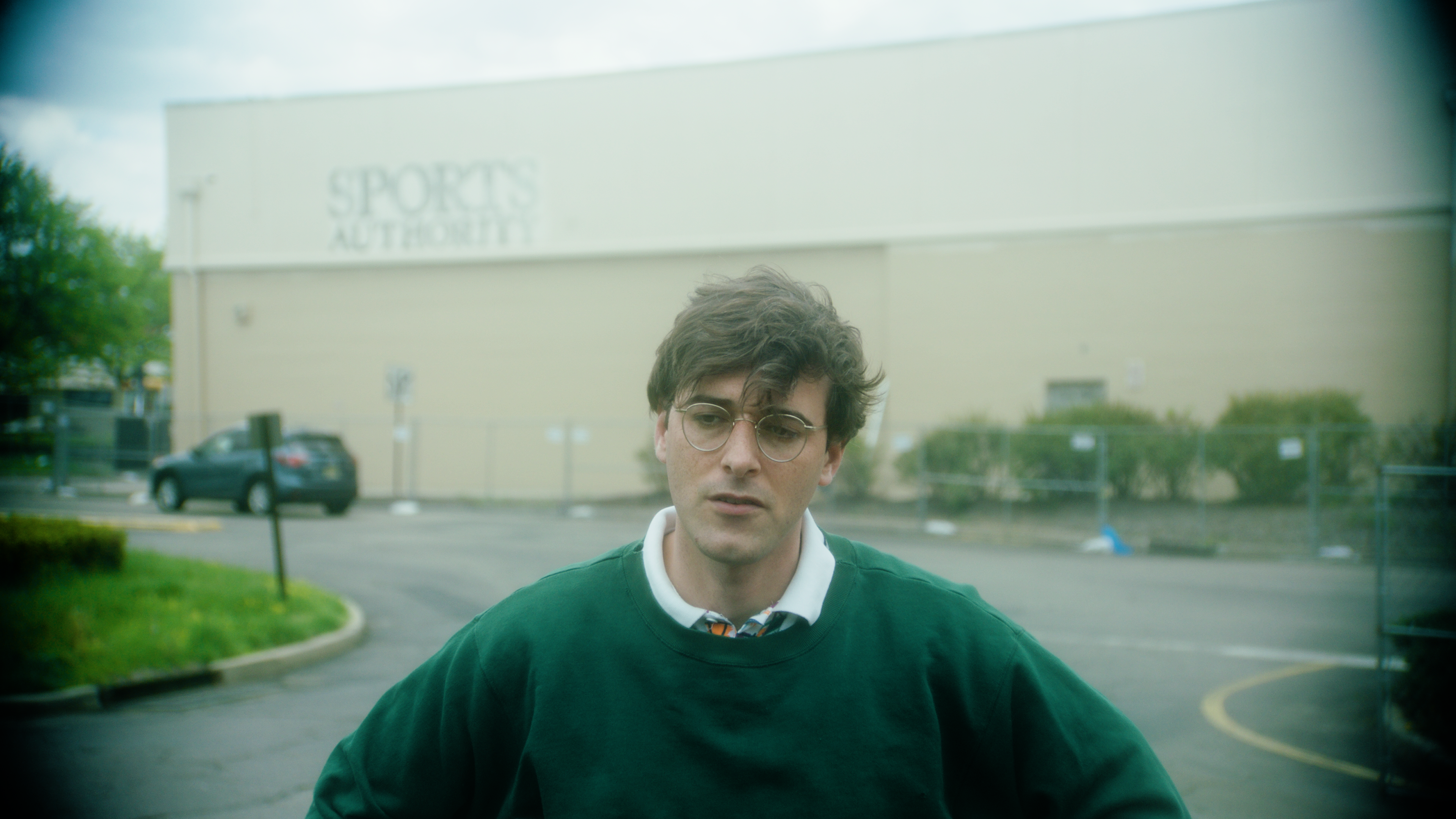
- Mondanile in Paramus, New Jersey, 2017

Background information
- Origin: New Jersey, United States
- Genres: Hypnagogic pop; chillwave; lo-fi; neo-psychedelia; bedroom pop; indie rock
- Years active: 2006–present
- Labels: Domino; Woodsist
- Spinoffs: Real Estate
- Members: Matt Mondanile
- Past members: Luka Usmiani; Samuel Franklin; Alex Craig; Josh da Costa; Malcolm Perkins; Ross Chait; Dale Simmons; Ian Drennan

Ducktails is a solo project led by American songwriter and guitarist Matt Mondanile, started in 2006.

== History ==
=== Origins and early recordings ===
Mondanile started Ducktails in a tool shed in Northampton, Massachusetts the summer before his last year at Hampshire College. The band name is a play on the title of the animated television series, DuckTales, from the late 1980s and early 1990s. He recorded his first release, 1992 Demo, on a 4-track with cheap multi effects pedals and a guitar. After leaving college he moved back to his parents' home in Ridgewood, New Jersey, where he recorded in the basement. Between 2007 and 2012 he recorded several albums, singles, cassettes, and split releases, mostly recorded on cassette tape. After a tour of California in 2008, Ducktails performed at the echo curio venue in Los Angeles, where Britt, the owner of the Fun, Not Fun label, purchased numerous cassette from Mondanile, and signed him for an album.

Ducktails' self-titled debut album proper was released in 2009 on the Not Not Fun label, followed later that year with Landscapes, on the label Olde English Spelling Bee. The third album Ducktails III: Arcade Dynamics was released in 2011 on the Woodsist label, and saw a move away from improvised experiments towards pop. Ducktails releases have received significant critical acclaim, most notably from Pitchfork Media who have favourably reviewed the albums, and produced two video features on the band. The band were associated with the mid-2000s hypnagogic pop scene by critics.

=== Studio albums ===
In 2012 Mondanile signed to Domino Records and released The Flower Lane. In contrast to his earlier work, it was recorded in a studio and mixed over the summer of 2012 with Al Carlson (Peaking Lights) and co-written by New Jersey band Big Troubles, who had backed Mondanile in live shows for some time. The ten-track album was released January 28, 2013, preceded by the single "Letter of Intent", which featured vocals from Jessa Farkas of Future Shuttle and bass from Joel Ford of Ford & Lopatin. On January 23, 2013, Pitchfork TV broadcast a live stream of the band's album release show at Manhattan's (Le) Poisson Rouge with guest appearances from Big Troubles, Joel Ford, Jessa Farkas, and Real Estate's Martin Courtney.

On July 25, 2013, Ducktails performed in the courtyard of the Museum of Modern Art as part of PopRally's MoMa Nights series. Mondanile then moved to Los Angeles in 2014, and began recording demos for his second studio album, St. Catherine. After a few studio sessions, Domino Records suggested Mondanile to work with a producer. Mondanile subsequently chose Robert Schnapf, who most notably worked Elliott Smith. Mondanile brought in notable musicians to collaborate, including Julia Holter and James Ferraro. Ducktails played many international festivals including Primavera Sound and Field Day. As Ducktails, Mondanile has toured the world solo as well as with a band performing extensively in Australia, Japan, Europe, United States and Canada. Mondanile has also collaborated with Panda Bear of Animal Collective as well as Madeline Follin of Cults and Dan Lopatin of Oneohtrix Point Never. Their music was positively reviewed by the BBC and is regularly played on BBC 6Music by the likes of Gideon Coe, Marc Riley and Don Letts.

In 2016, Mondanile began recording of what would become his sixth album, Jersey Devil, in his studio in downtown Los Angeles. Early song writing sessions included collaborations with Girls Guitarist, John Anderson. While recording Jersey Devil, Mondanile moved back to New Jersey to record and write the remainder of the album. He asked Steve Shelley, drummer of Sonic Youth to mix the album in his studio, Echo Canyon West, located in Hoboken. Shelley recommended Ernie Indratat to engineer, and the album's production was completed in August 2017. Jersey Devil was subsequently released on Mondanile's own label, New Images Limited on October 6, 2017. Mondanile released two compilations, Daffy Duck in Hollywood, and Hummingbird Babysitter, featuring unused material from the Jersey Devil recording sessions between 2015 and 2017. The compilations were initially distributed on cassettes during a European tour in May 2017, which featured acts James Ferraro and Spencer Clark.

On October 14, 2017, it was reported that Mondanile's departure from Real Estate was due to allegations made against Mondanile regarding his "unacceptable treatment of women." Prior to the band's statement, Mondanile had denied the allegations. As a result of these sexual misconduct allegations, Ducktails tour dates in Asia and the U.S. were cancelled by the promoters, publicist Daniel Gill and former label Woodsist ceased working with Ducktails, and Ducktails was dropped by the Japanese label Plancha. Most of Ducktails' albums were also briefly removed from streaming services.

In early 2018, Mondanile began writing his next album, Watercolors. He moved to Athens, Greece, and continued writing the album. In August 2018, Mondanile moved to Antwerp, Belgium, to live with his girlfriend and wrote the majority of the album there. However, he would routinely fly back to Athens to record with sound engineer and member of Voyage Limpid Sound, Sergios Voudris, in the Diskex studio. The album was released in June 2019. Although not many publications reviewed the album, it was received positively by critics. In September 2019, Mondanile released his third compilation, which included previously unreleased material from 2014 to 2018, titled Hard Rock Cafe Chernobyl.

== Musical style ==
The band's music has been alternately characterized as "hypnagogic pop", "woozy, horizontal pop" and "lo-fi". AllMusic described their work as "all burbling analog synths, bedroom processing, and sunburnt soundscapes." Jason Lymangrover in The List described Ducktails releases as having "a sketchpad feel to them" described as "a typically giddy blend of psych, drone, summer jams, tropical riffs and hazy vocalisms". Early recordings were freeform jams, once described as "bizarre, krautrock-influenced sound collages", but later material has more conventional song structures, more akin to his work in Real Estate. Liz Pelly, reviewing The Flower Lane for the Providence Phoenix described his earlier work as "collaged pop ideas with kaleidoscopic filters and home-recorded hiss".

In a 2009 interview, Mondanile described his live performances as "improvised and more like drone music". He explained his preference for recording on cassette: "I like the idea of everything being as raw-sounding as possible, with nothing covering up the sound. It's like the only thing covering it up might be the quality of the recording.

== Band members ==
Current

- Matt Mondanile – vocals, guitar, keyboards (2006–present)

Former

- Alex Craig – guitar (2013–2015)
- Luka Usmiani – bass guitar (2013–2014)
- Ian Drennan – guitar (2013–2014)
- Samuel Franklin – drums (2013–2014)
- Josh da Costa – bass guitar (2015–2016)
- Malcolm Perkins – guitar (2015–2016)
- Ross Chait – drums (2015–2016)
- Dale Simmons – keyboard (2015–2016)

== Discography ==
Studio albums

- Ducktails (2009) Not Not Fun
- Landscapes (2009) Olde English Spelling Bee
- Ducktails III: Arcade Dynamics (2011) Woodsist
- The Flower Lane (2013) Domino
- St. Catherine (2015) Domino
- Jersey Devil (2017) New Images
- Watercolors (2019) New Images
- Impressions (2021) New Images
- The Cradle (2023) New Images

EPs

- Ducktails (2008), Breaking World Records
- Killin the Vibe (2011), New Images
- Wish Hotel (2013), Domino
- Done (2026), New Images

Compilations

- Backyard (2009) Release The Bats
- Daffy Duck in Hollywood (2017) New Images
- Hummingbird Babysitter (2017) New Images
- Hard Rock Cafe Chernobyl (2019) New Images
- Ramapo River Anthology (2021) New Images
- Sketches (2021) New Images

Singles

- "Mirror Image" (2010), SHDWPLY
- "Hamilton Road" (2010), Olde English Spelling Bee
- "Letter of Intent" (2013), Domino
- "Headbanging in the Mirror" (2015), Domino
- "Surreal Exposure" (2015), Domino
- "Don't Wanna Let You Know " (2015) New Images
- "Plastic Melody" (2018) New Images
- "New Dream" (2018) New Images
- "Answered in a Prayer" (2019) New Images
- "Impression / Only a Fool" (2021) New Images
- "Beyond the Gate" (2026) New Images

Remixes

- Mind Mischief – Tame Impala (2013), Modular Recordings

Live recordings

- Live On WFMU (2010), Inflated

Split releases

- Julian Lynch/Ducktails split EP (2009), Underwater Peoples
- Bored Fortress (2010), Not Not Fun – split single with Rangers
- Ducktails/Dracula Lewis split (2010), No Fun

Cassette-only releases

- 1992 Demo (2007), Future Sound Recordings
- Dreams In Mirror Field (2007), Future Sound Recordings
- II (2008), Future Sound Recordings
- Acres Of Shade (2008), Arbor
- Summer Of Saucers (2008, 2nd edition 2013), DNT – split with Mudboy
- Ducktails / Gang Wizard / Vluba / Golden Cup (2008), 8mm
- Universal Mutant Studios (2009), Stenze Quo Musik/Historiaens – split with Buffle, In the Eye of Vision, and Cotopaxi
- Lost (2010), Fuck It Tapes
