= Martin Courtney =

American musician (born 1985)

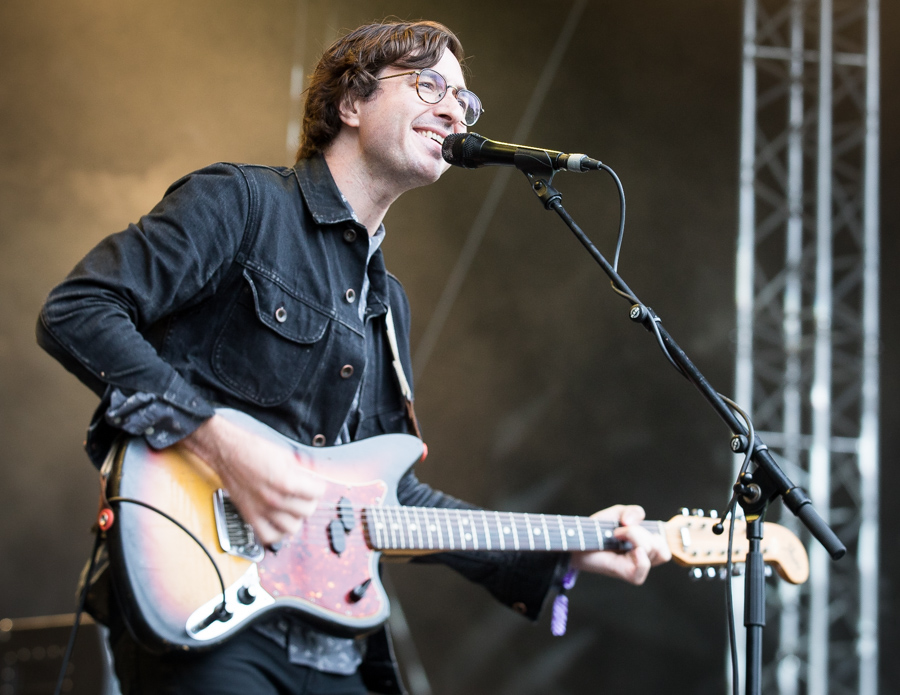
- Courtney performing with Real Estate in 2017

Background information
- Born: Martin Courtney IV; September 28, 1985 (age 40); New Jersey, United States
- Genres: Indie rock; psychedelic rock; surf rock
- Occupations: Singer, songwriter, musician
- Instruments: Vocals, guitar
- Years active: 2009–present
- Labels: Domino, Mexican Summer, Woodsist, Underwater Peoples, Half Machine
- Website: http://martincourtneyiv.com/ (defunct)

Martin Courtney IV (born September 28, 1985) is an American musician and the frontman of the American indie rock band Real Estate.

In 2015, Courtney also released his first solo album, Many Moons, followed by his second solo album, Magic Sign, in 2022.

== Early life and personal life ==
Courtney was born as Martin Courtney IV in Ridgewood, New Jersey, the son of Martin Courtney III and Mary Ellen Courtney. He attended Ridgewood High School with current Real Estate bandmate Alex Bleeker and former bandmate Matt Mondanile. After graduating from high school, he studied at The Evergreen State College in Olympia, Washington, where his focus was "mostly literature." Courtney's parents run a real estate business, which inspired the name of the band. Courtney spent a short time as the keyboardist for indie punk rock group Titus Andronicus from the neighboring town Glen Rock, New Jersey in 2006.

Courtney married his wife in Ridgewood on October 13, 2012, following Real Estate's tour for 2011's Days. They have since had multiple daughters. He currently resides in upstate New York with his family.

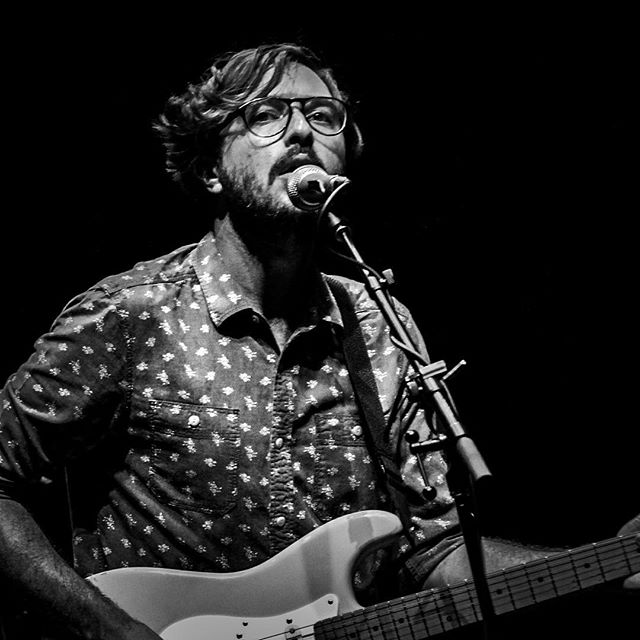
Courtney performing with Real Estate in Melbourne, Australia in 2013

Courtney released his first solo album, Many Moons, on October 30, 2015, to critical acclaim. This was followed by his second solo release Magic Sign, on June 24, 2022.

== Discography ==
with Real Estate

- Real Estate (2009)
- Days (2011)
- Atlas (2014)
- In Mind (2017)
- The Main Thing (2020)
- Daniel (2024)

Solo

- Many Moons (2015)
- Magic Sign (2022)
