= Real Estate (band) =

American indie rock band

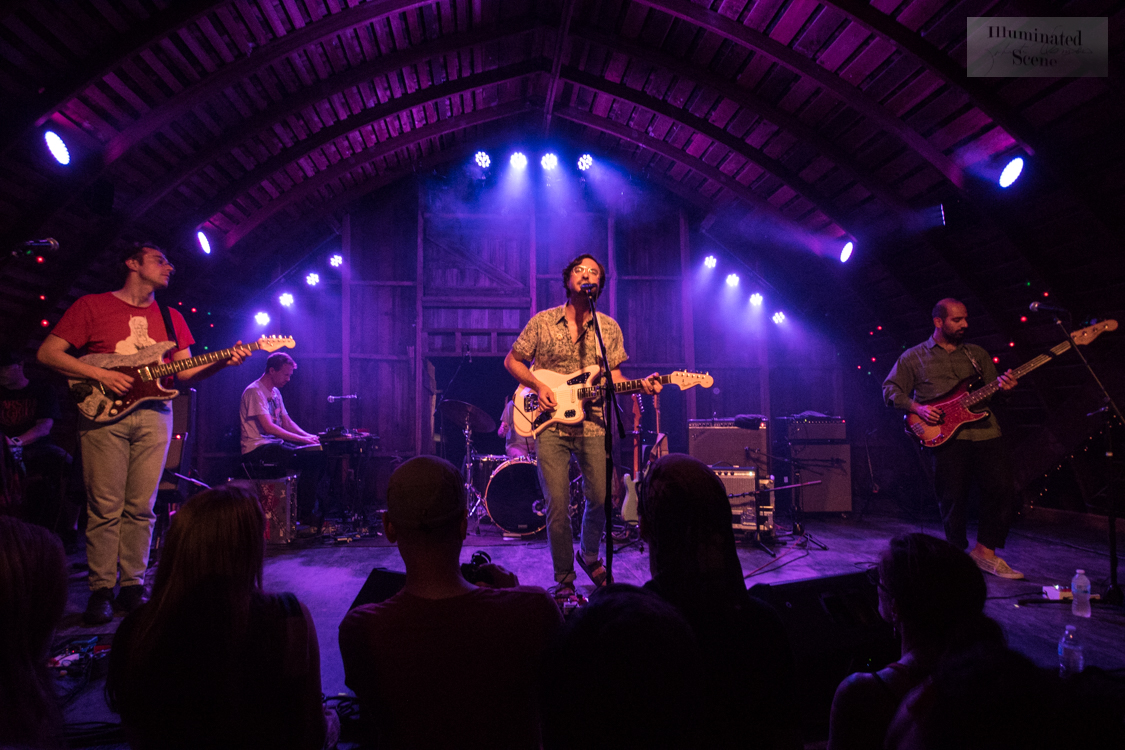
- Real Estate performing in 2018.

Background information
- Origin: Ridgewood, New Jersey, United States
- Genres: Indie rock; jangle pop; surf rock; dream pop
- Years active: 2008–present
- Labels: Mexican Summer; Woodsist; Underwater Peoples; Half Machine; Domino
- Members: Martin Courtney; Alex Bleeker; Matt Kallman; Sammi Niss; James Richardson
- Past members: Etienne Pierre Duguay; Jonah Maurer; Matt Mondanile; Jackson Pollis; Julian Lynch
- Website: Official website

Real Estate is an American indie rock band from Ridgewood, New Jersey, United States, formed in 2008. The band is currently based in Brooklyn, New York, and consists of Martin Courtney (vocals, guitar), Alex Bleeker (bass, vocals), Matt Kallman (keyboards), Sammi Niss (drums) and James Richardson (guitar).

To date, the band have released six studio albums: Real Estate (2009), Days (2011), Atlas (2014), In Mind (2017), The Main Thing (2020) and Daniel (2024).

== History ==
=== Formation and early years ===
Courtney, Bleeker and Matt Mondanile were childhood friends in Ridgewood, New Jersey. Courtney and Bleeker first met in third grade, and became friends in eighth grade over a mutual interest in Weezer, Built to Spill and Pavement. When Courtney and Bleeker were students in Ridgewood High School, Courtney met Mondanile, who was a year above him, while on the school bus. Mondanile was listening to the Impossibles on his Walkman and asked if Courtney wanted to listen. From there, Courtney became acquainted with Mondanile and his friends, and even auditioned to join the latter's band as a bass player before being rejected in favor of an older kid who had a car. Mondanile and Bleeker also took guitar lessons from the same teacher, along with school friend and future Real Estate guitarist Julian Lynch. After lessons, Mondanile would teach Bleeker how to play Pixies songs. Meanwhile, Courtney was a proficient bassist who played in the school's jazz band.

On Courtney's 15th birthday, he organized a show in his parents' back yard, with performances by all of his friends who were in bands. This was the first time that he, Bleeker and Mondanile performed live together. Throughout high school, all three would play in various bands, facilitated by the school's Open Mic Nights.

After graduating from Ridgewood High School, they went their separate ways to study in college. Courtney attended The Evergreen State College in Olympia, Washington; Mondanile attended Hampshire College in Amherst, Massachusetts where he became involved in the burgeoning local noise scene and started his own recording project which he named Ducktails; and Bleeker attended Bennington College in Bennington, Vermont. Each would continue writing songs on their own and pass them among each other.

During a summer break while they were in college, Courtney, Mondanile and Bleeker reunited as Lese Majesty, the recording and touring backing band for their high school friend Julian Lynch, with Lynch as the lead singer and guitarist, Courtney on Fender Rhodes piano, Mondanile on bass and Bleeker on guitar. Playing drums was Etienne Pierre Duguay, an acquaintance of Mondanile's in Massachusetts with whom he had formed a band called Predator Vision that was named after watching the movie Predator while listening to a cassette recording of them jamming in the basement of Mondanile's house, high on acid. Lese Majesty recorded an album at Courtney's uncle's house in Maine and embarked on a U.S. tour, though Courtney had to opt out due to still being in college and not having the freedom to tour.

Courtney's songs in particular inspired the others to suggest forming another band to perform them. Courtney shared some song ideas with Mondanile over G-chat and, when they moved back to Ridgewood in summer 2008, they wrote more songs which formed the basis of what would become Real Estate. After recording several songs, they were eventually joined by Bleeker and Duguay. They would jam in the basement of Courtney's parents' house, and during a night of drinking vodka by the backyard pool, Courtney came up with the bass line for "Suburban Beverage." Bleeker briefly moved to Philadelphia while the others continued developing the band, and when Bleeker asked to rejoin, he took up the bass so that Courtney could play guitar, making it easier for him to sing. Spurred on by the success of local bands Titus Andronicus and Vivian Girls, they decided to take the band seriously. After lengthy deliberation, they chose the name Real Estate because Courtney was studying to acquire his real estate license at the same time the band started, and even managed to sell his grandmother's house. While rehearsing at Courtney's house, his parents also suggested that they all get real estate licenses. The band also had the idea of working for Courtney's parents' real estate agency in case their music career didn't achieve success.

The band is influenced by the Feelies, as Real Estate said to Still in Rock.

=== Real Estate, Days, and Atlas (2009–2015) ===
After issuing singles on the Underwater Peoples and Woodsist labels, the band's 2009 self-titled debut received critical acclaim, including an 8.5 rating and Best New Music tag from Pitchfork Media. Review aggregator Metacritic gave the album a normalised rating of 79%, indicating "generally favourable reviews". Tours followed, supporting acts such as Girls, Kurt Vile, Woods, and Deerhunter. In 2010, Real Estate performed at the Pitchfork Music Festival in Chicago and the Primavera Sound Festival in Barcelona.

In 2011, Real Estate signed with the Domino Recording Company. After initial recording sessions and prior to signing the deal, the band parted ways with Duguay, not wanting to be legally-bound to the drummer due to his unreliability. Subsequently, the second album, Days, features one song with Duguay, "Out of Tune," while the rest of the drum tracks were performed by Courtney, Mondanile and Samuel Franklin. For live shows, the band recruited drummer Jackson Pollis, formerly of Tiny Masters of Today, and keyboardist Jonah Maurer, a friend of Mondanile's at Buxton boarding school in Massachusetts.

The group issued Days, on October 18, 2011. The album received positive reviews, including a rating of 77/100 on Metacritic and 8.7 on Pitchfork. Later that year, The Fader featured Real Estate on the cover of Issue No. 76. 2012 saw the band perform at the Coachella Valley Music and Arts Festival in Indio, California and the Pitchfork Music Festival in Chicago. From mid-2012 and throughout 2013, Real Estate shows would feature the band playing new material, some of which would eventually be included in their third album.

A single "Talking Backwards", was released in early 2014, followed by the band's third album, Atlas. The album was written by Courtney, Mondanile, Bleeker and Pollis, with Maurer having moved on to join Titus Andronicus. Shortly before recording of the album commenced, the band decided to add keyboard parts that were more advanced than they were capable of themselves, and so they recruited Matt Kallman, formerly of Girls.

=== Mondanile's departure and In Mind (2016–2019) ===
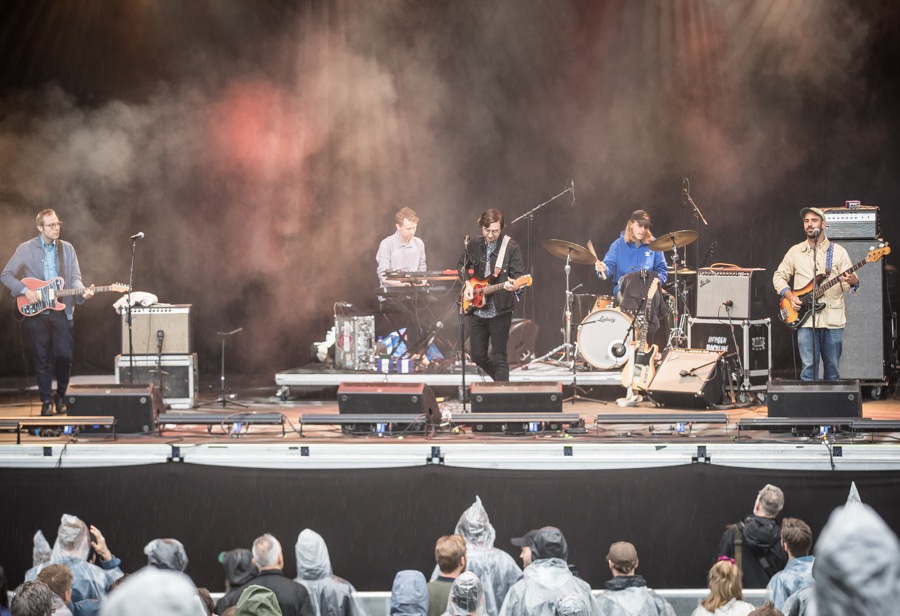
Real Estate on stage in 2017

On May 25, 2016, the band announced that Julian Lynch had replaced Matt Mondanile, who "will continue to focus his creative energy on Ducktails." Regarding Mondanile's departure, Courtney admitted that it was less than amicable. "He didn’t just quit. I mean, there’s more to it. It’s kind of stuff that I don’t necessarily want to talk about. So I don’t know, it's just complicated. It’s definitely a little more mutual than I guess what people might think is the case," said Courtney.

After Mondanile's exit, the band considered recording their fourth album as a four-piece, with an additional guitarist brought in for live shows. While Courtney was in Madison, Wisconsin for a solo show, he met with Lynch, who by then already had several solo albums to his name and had collaborated with the members of Real Estate in various forms since high school in Ridgewood. When Courtney mentioned a vacancy in Real Estate, Lynch offered his services. After Courtney consulted with Bleeker and gained the latter's approval, Lynch officially joined and participated in writing and recording the band's fourth album.

Regarding the change in guitarists, Courtney said, "Removing Matt from the band definitely changes the equation, but I'm pretty sure I met Julian on the same day I met Matt Mondanile. So this isn't just some new guy; we have a long history with him, too." As for Lynch's contribution to the band's sound, Courtney commented, "He's a very different musician from Matthew, all around. We weren't asking him to join to replace Matthew. We were asking him to join in order to make the band new. He was a friend, yes, but it was an added bonus that he would be pretty different from Matt. So it was exciting for us to see what that meant."

During the band's Fall 2016 tour, Lynch was unable to participate due to a five-month visit to India from September to February with the purpose of research for his Ph.D dissertation in ethnomusicology. The band recruited Doug Keith, who had played guitar on tour for Courtney's solo album Many Moons, to fill in until Lynch's return.

On January 24, 2017, the band announced the March 17 release of the Cole M.G.N.-produced In Mind, their fourth album and the first with Lynch. They also debuted the music video for first single "Darling". The new album's release date coincided with several gigs the band played at SXSW, including a headlining set at an event hosted by Showtime to promote the new series of Twin Peaks; the show's lead actor Kyle MacLachlan also introduced the band before their set. On May 22, 2017, the band debuted an animated video for In Mind's second single "Stained Glass", along with a special interactive website in which viewers could virtually add color to the video as it played. On May 26, Real Estate announced it had designed a shoe for Keep Company, with net proceeds for the Keep x Real Estate limited edition Ramos shoes going to the ACLU. Each pair of shoes included a cassette single containing previously unreleased instrumental "In Time" and demos of "Two Arrows" and "Two Part".

On October 4, 2017, the band announced the postponement of a fall tour "for a mix of unforeseen reasons both personal and professional," with the cancelled dates being rescheduled for February 2018. On October 13, 2017, the band issued a statement indicating that Mondanile had been fired due to allegations of his mistreatment towards multiple women. Hours before the statement was issued, Mondanile denied the allegations in a phone interview for Pitchfork. Three days later, an article elaborating on the allegations was published in Spin, where the band added that they had not gone public sooner with details regarding Mondanile's dismissal because "the women concerned requested privacy and we honored their wishes." In a statement issued by his attorneys, Mondanile apologized for his inappropriate behavior. He also accused Real Estate of violating the "leaving agreement" he signed upon his dismissal that "prohibits both him and the band members from making any negative or derogatory statements about the other, or that may negatively affect the other’s reputation and career," claiming the band came forward not to "protect the victims" as stated but "to protect the band's commercial viability."

In January 2018, Mondanile further elaborated on his firing from Real Estate, stating that a disagreement over the inclusion of one of his songs on Atlas led to a falling out with Courtney, and he wanted to record the next album with Courtney and Bleeker at the new studio he had set up in Los Angeles without Jackson Pollis whom he felt uncomfortable working with due to Pollis' dislike towards him over his behavior with women. Ultimately, Courtney and Bleeker told Mondanile that they didn't want to record with him due to his unwillingness to tour, the distance of their living situations, and his treatment of women.

On November 16, 2017, it was reported that Real Estate would be contributing original songs for the upcoming romantic comedy Plus One starring Jack Quaid and Maya Erskine.

=== The Main Thing and Half a Human (2020–2021) ===
On January 15, 2020, the band announced their fifth studio album, The Main Thing, which was released on February 28, 2020. Alongside the announcement was the release of the album's first single, "Paper Cup", featuring Amelia Meath of Sylvan Esso. The single was also accompanied by a music video. The Main Thing was recorded with childhood friend and producer Kevin McMahon.

On August 4, 2020, Real Estate announced that Jackson Pollis was taking time out from the band to pursue other interests, with Sammi Niss replacing Pollis as the band’s live drummer.

In April 2021, the band released an EP, Half a Human, composed of songs that the band had worked on during The Main Thing's recording sessions but were later completed during the COVID-19 pandemic.

=== Daniel and Lynch's departure (2023–present) ===
The band released its sixth studio album, Daniel, on February 23, 2024. The album was produced by Daniel Tashian, and was the band's first to feature drummer Sammi Niss. The following year, the band released The Wee Small Hours: B-Sides and Other Detritus 2011-2025, a collection of b-sides and rarities.

On July 14, 2025, Real Estate announced a "the eleven year and seven month anniversary tour" of Atlas which was scheduled to begin on September 10. On August 23 guitarist Julian Lynch announced his departure from Real Estate with his last shows being the band's upcoming dates on Tennis's farewell tour prior to the Atlas anniversary tour. For the Atlas anniversary tour, the band recruited James Richardson to replace Lynch on guitar.

== Members ==
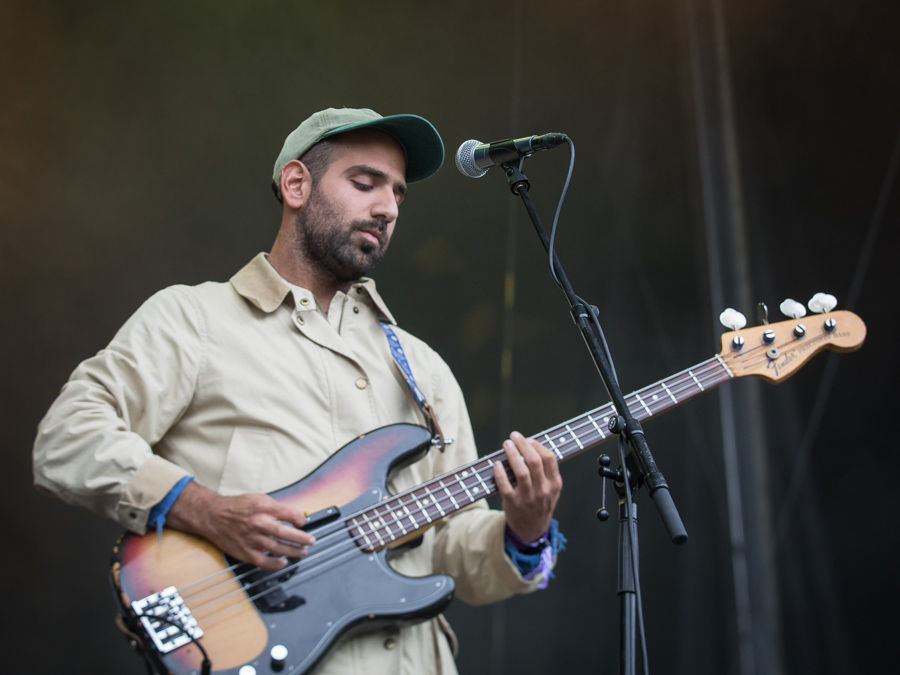
Alex Bleeker in 2017

=== Current members ===
- Martin Courtney – lead vocals, rhythm guitar (2008–present)
- Alex Bleeker – bass guitar, backing and occasional lead vocals (2008–present)
- Matt Kallman – keyboards (2013–present)
- Sammi Niss – drums (2020–present)
- James Richardson – lead guitar (2025–present)

=== Former members ===
- Matt Mondanile – lead guitar (2008–2016)
- Etienne Pierre Duguay – drums (2008–2011)
- Jonah Maurer – keyboards (2011–2013)
- Jackson Pollis – drums (2011–2020)
- Julian Lynch – lead guitar, clarinet (2016–2025)

=== Touring members ===
- Doug Keith – lead guitar (2016)

== Discography ==
=== Studio albums ===
List of studio albums, with selected chart positions
Title	Album details	Peak chart positions									
Title	Album details	US	US Indie	AUS	BEL (FL)	BEL (WA)	IRE	NLD	SCO	UK	UK Indie
Real Estate	Released: November 17, 2009; Label: Woodsist	— (Note: Real Estate did not enter the US Billboard 200, but peaked at number 14 on the Top Heatseekers Albums Chart.)	—	—	—	—	—	—	—	—	—
Days	Released: October 18, 2011; Label: Domino	52	11	—	— (Note: Days did not enter the Ultratop 200 Albums chart, but peaked at number eight on the Flemish Heatseekers chart.)	—	—	— (Note: Days did not enter the MegaCharts Albums chart, but peaked at number 17 on the Alternative chart.)	—	—	24
Atlas	Released: March 4, 2014; Label: Domino	34	6	66	73	172	36	67	60	43	7
In Mind	Released: March 17, 2017; Label: Domino	100	6	75	125	85	—	43	66	80	10
The Main Thing	Released: February 28, 2020; Label: Domino	— (Note: The Main Thing did not enter the US Billboard 200, but peaked at number 26 on the US Album Sales Chart.)	38	—	—	—	—	—	59	— (Note: The Main Thing did not enter the UK Albums Chart, but peaked at number 44 on the UK Physical Albums Chart.)	16
Daniel	Released: February 23, 2024; Label: Domino	— (Note: Daniel did not enter the US Billboard 200, but peaked at number 40 on the US Top Current Albums Chart.)	—	— (Note: Daniel did not enter the Australian ARIA Albums Chart but peaked at number 43 on the ARIA Digital Albums Chart.)	—	—	—	—	29	— (Note: Daniel did not enter the UK Albums Chart but peaked at number 29 on the UK Album Sales Chart.)	15
"—" denotes a recording that did not chart or was not released in that territory.

=== EPs ===
Title	EP details
Atlantic City Expressway	Released: 2009; Label: Future Sound Recordings
Reality	Released: March 1, 2010; Label: Mexican Summer
Half a Human	Released: March 26, 2021; Label: Domino

=== Singles ===
List of singles, with selected chart positions
Title	Year	Peak chart positions					Album
Title	Year	US Sales	US AAA	BEL (FL) Tip	JPN Over.	UK Sales	Album
"Suburban Beverage"	2009	—	—	—	—	—	Real Estate
"Fake Blues"	2009	—	—	—	—	—	Real Estate
"Younger Than Yesterday"	2009	—	—	—	—	—	Reality EP
"Out of Tune / Reservoir #3"	2010	—	—	—	—	—	Days
"It's Real"	2011	—	—	—	—	17	Days
"Green Aisles"	2011	—	—	—	—	54	Days
"Easy"	2012	—	—	—	—	19	Days
"Talking Backwards"	2014	7	—	84	—	9	Atlas
"Crime"	2014	—	—	—	—	—	Atlas
"Had to Hear"	2014	—	—	—	—	—	Atlas
"Darling"	2017	—	24	—	—	—	In Mind
"Stained Glass"	2017	—	—	—	—	25	In Mind
"Paper Cup" (featuring Sylvan Esso)	2020	—	23	—	—	—	The Main Thing
"The Main Thing"	2020	—	—	—	—	—	The Main Thing
"Half a Human"	2021	—	—	—	—	11	Half a Human
"Water Underground"	2023	—	16	—	20	—	Daniel
"—" denotes a recording that did not chart or was not released in that territory.
