= Matt Mondanile =

American musician (born 1985)

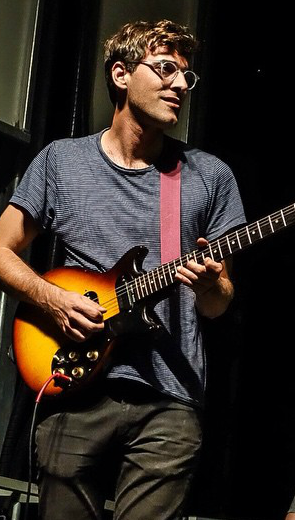
- Mondanile performing with Real Estate, 2014

Background information
- Born: 1985 (age 40–41); Ridgewood, New Jersey, United States
- Genres: Indie rock
- Instruments: Guitar, vocals, keyboards
- Years active: 2006–present
- Label: Domino

Matthew Anthony Mondanile is an American guitarist, singer and songwriter. He is best known as the former lead guitarist of the American indie rock band Real Estate, with whom he recorded three studio albums, and for his solo music project Ducktails.

== Early life ==
Mondanile was born as Matthew Anthony Mondanile. He attended Ridgewood High School with two of his future Real Estate bandmates, Martin Courtney and Alex Bleeker. Mondanile auditioned the former to join his high school band as a bass player but opted for an older schoolmate with a car, while the latter learned how to play Pixies songs from Mondanile, along with taking guitar lessons together.

After graduating from high school, Mondanile attended Hampshire College in Amherst, Massachusetts, where he studied literature, history and art.

== Career ==
=== Ducktails ===
While studying in Massachusetts, Mondanile became involved in the local music scene, where he would book shows for his campus and join a number of bands, including Predator Vision with future Real Estate drummer Etienne Pierre Duguay.

After a stint in Berlin to work on his thesis where he became acquainted with musicians such as James Ferraro, Spencer Clark and Steven Warwick, Mondanile became influenced by their method of quickly recording music on cassette and releasing it. Upon returning to the U.S., Mondanile recorded what was to become the first Ducktails release in one day, and released it the next by giving copies of the tape to friends. Upon graduation, Mondanile moved back into his parents' house and continued writing and recording Ducktails material there.

=== Real Estate ===
Mondanile kept in touch with high school friends Martin Courtney and Alex Bleeker while each of them had moved away from Ridgewood for college, and would send each other music that they had been working on individually. During a summer break, they formed Lese Majesty with Mondanile's Massachusetts acquaintance Etienne Pierre Duguay for the purpose of being the touring band for Julian Lynch, another high schoolmate of Mondanile, Courtney and Bleeker's. When Mondanile and Courtney moved back to Ridgewood in summer 2008, they starting writing and recording songs which formed the basis of what would become Real Estate. After recording several songs, they were eventually joined by Bleeker and Duguay. Real Estate released their self-titled debut album in 2009 to critical acclaim, with Mondanile in particular gaining praise for his distinctive guitar work. Two subsequent albums, Days (2011) and Atlas (2014), brought the band further recognition.

On May 25, 2016, Real Estate announced that Mondanile had left the band, and "will continue to focus his creative energy on Ducktails."

== Sexual misconduct and abuse allegations ==
In October 2017, Real Estate elaborated on Mondanile's departure from the band by stating that they had fired him due to "allegations of unacceptable treatment of women" and that they were "no longer in contact" with Mondanile.

On October 16, 2017, Spin released an article describing the allegations against Mondanile, sharing details of incidents reported by seven women. Mondanile was accused of shoving at least two women into confined spaces while forcibly kissing and groping them, and of molesting at least four women in whose apartments he stayed while on tour. Many of these women were fans of Mondanile whose experiences occurred after they attended a Real Estate or Ducktails performance, and many were 5-10 years his junior. A classmate at Hampshire College also alleged that Mondanile molested her in her sleep in a dorm room in 2005. Julia Holter, Mondanile's former girlfriend who also contributed to the Ducktails album St. Catherine, stated in the wake of the allegations that Mondanile was "emotionally abusive to the point where I had to have a lawyer intervene and was afraid for my life."

On October 20, Mondanile issued an apology through his attorneys, admitting that he "took advantage of [his] position as a musician" and referring to himself as an "insensitive creep." In January 2018, Mondanile released another statement in which he claimed he had been in therapy for two years prior to the public accusations and lamented the effects of the allegations on his personal and professional life. He stated "I never considered myself a misognyist [sic] or sexual predator."

As a result of the allegations, Ducktails tour dates in Asia and the U.S. were cancelled by the promoters and Ducktails was dropped from Domino Recording Company.

== Discography ==
with Real Estate

- Real Estate (2009)
- Reality (2009)
- Days (2011)
- Atlas (2014)
